= What Else Do You Do? (A Compilation of Quiet Music) =

Compilation album by Various artists
- Released: 1990
- Recorded: Noise New York (New York City, NY)
- Genre: Experimental rock
- Length: 67:09
- Label: Shimmy Disc
- Producer: Kramer

Professional ratings
Review scores
Source	Rating
Allmusic	3/5 stars
Select	4/5 medals

What Else Do You Do? (A Compilation of Quiet Music) is a various artists compilation album, released in 1990 by Shimmy Disc.

== Track listing ==
Side one
No.	Title	Writer(s)	Artist	Length
1.	"Burn & Rob"	Paleface	Paleface	2:48
2.	"Smile"	Dean Wareham	Dean Wareham	2:40
3.	"Ill Fated Lovers Go Time Tripping"	Mark Kramer, Ann Magnuson, Dave Rick	Bongwater	1:47
4.	"Rosemary in Red"	Dogbowl	Dogbowl	4:00
5.	"The Protection Song"	Suzie Unger	Suzie Unger	4:08
6.	"1989 Blues"	Daniel Johnston	Daniel Johnston	2:44
7.	"Tip of the Iceberg"	David Keener	David Keener	3:18
8.	"I Was Much Mistaken"	Tuli Kupferberg	Tuli Kupferberg	3:26
9.	"Les Boites"	Catherine Jauniaux, Christian Marclay	Christian Marclay & Catherine Jauniaux	3:00

Side two
No.	Title	Writer(s)	Artist	Length
1.	"The Warm-Up Song"	Rob Elk, Dean J. Seal	Mr. Elk & Mr. Seal	2:28
2.	"Only House on My Block"	David Greenberger, Phil Kaplan	Men & Volts	1:57
3.	"The Future/Dinosaurs Are Better"	Charles Brohawn, Chris Mason	The Tinklers	3:51
4.	"The Man With the Foldback Ears"	Fred Lane	Fred Lane	2:48
5.	"Dark as a Dungeon" (Merle Travis cover)	Merle Travis	The Hat Brothers	3:43
6.	"Wherm I Gonna Go?"	Rebby Sharp	Rebby Sharp	3:55
7.	"The Invisible People"	False Prophets	False Prophets	4:07
8.	"Day"	Tamela Glenn	Tamela Glenn	3:38
9.	"Move"	Daved Hild	Daved Hild	2:15

CD edition track listing
No.	Title	Writer(s)	Artist	Length
1.	"Burn & Rob"	Paleface	Paleface	2:48
2.	"Smile"	Dean Wareham	Dean Wareham	2:40
3.	"Ill Fated Lovers Go Time Tripping"	Mark Kramer, Ann Magnuson, Dave Rick	Bongwater	1:47
4.	"Rosemary in Red"	Dogbowl	Dogbowl	4:00
5.	"The Protection Song"	Suzie Unger	Suzie Unger	4:08
6.	"1989 Blues"	Daniel Johnston	Daniel Johnston	2:44
7.	"Tip of the Iceberg"	David Keener	David Keener	3:18
8.	"I Was Much Mistaken"	Tuli Kupferberg	Tuli Kupferberg	3:26
9.	"Les Boites"	Catherine Jauniaux, Christian Marclay	Christian Marclay & Catherine Jauniaux	3:00
10.	"Dual Control"	Azalia Snail	Azalia Snail	2:05
11.	"Life"	King Missile	King Missile	4:38
12.	"The Warm-Up Song"	Rob Elk, Dean J. Seal	Mr. Elk & Mr. Seal	2:28
13.	"Only House on My Block"	David Greenberger, Phil Kaplan	Men & Volts	1:57
14.	"The Future/Dinosaurs Are Better"	Charles Brohawn, Chris Mason	The Tinklers	3:51
15.	"The Man With the Foldback Ears"	Fred Lane	Fred Lane	2:48
16.	"Dark as a Dungeon" (Merle Travis cover)	Merle Travis	The Hat Brothers	3:43
17.	"Wherm I Gonna Go?"	Rebby Sharp	Rebby Sharp	3:55
18.	"The Invisible People"	False Prophets	False Prophets	4:07
19.	"Day"	Tamela Glenn	Tamela Glenn	3:38
20.	"Move"	Daved Hild	Daved Hild	2:15
21.	"Fatigue"	Lida Husik	Lida Husik	3:35
22.	"Sshhh"	Mark Kramer	Kramer	3:34
23.	"Blue of Noon"	John Zorn	John Zorn	1:05

== Personnel ==
Adapted from the What Else Do You Do? (A Compilation of Quiet Music) liner notes.

- Kramer – production, engineering

== Release history ==
Region	Date	Label	Format	Catalog
United States	1990	Shimmy Disc	CD, CS, LP	shimmy 034
Netherlands	1990	Shimmy Disc	CD, LP	SDE 9021
