= Korekyojinn =

Korekyojinn (是巨人) (also spelled Korekyojin) is a Japanese progressive rock power trio. Founded in 1998, the band is a project by members of several bands within the Japanese progressive rock/zeuhl scene and has released albums on two US labels, John Zorn's Tzadik Records and Skin Graft Records as well as on the Japanese label Magaibutsu. In Japanese, the band's name means "this giant" and is a pun on the band names This Heat and Gentle Giant.

== Members ==
Drummer Tatsuya Yoshida, owner of the Magaibutsu label, has founded the band Ruins and has been active in several other bands and collaborations, e.g. Kōenjihyakkei and Daimonji. Bassist Mitsuro Nasuno was a member of the noise/improvisation bands Ground Zero and Altered States and has been a member of Daimonji; guitarist Natsuki Kido has been a member of the zeuhl band Bondage Fruit.

== Music ==
Korekyojinn plays instrumental music composed by Yoshida Tatsuya. The band web page describes it as "Progressive Jazz Rock Polyrhythmique" – "where progressive rock and contemporary jazz collide into a breathtaking, futuristic, hard rock funk".

== Reception ==
Allmusic reviewers have awarded the first album Korekyojin (1999) with 3.5/5 and the third album Isotope (2005) with 4/5 stars, while Sean Westergaard states in his unrated Allmusic review of Tundra (2011): "Tundra is a great album by a great band". Pitchfork Media's Dominique Leone reviewed the second album Arabesque (2004) with a rating of 8/10. The German progressive rock review website Babyblaue Seiten rated Korekyojin and Arabesque with 11/15 and Isotope with 13/15.

== Discography ==
- 1999: Korekyojin (Tzadik)
- 2004: Arabesque (Magaibutsu)
- 2005: Isotope (Tzadik)
- 2006: Jackson (Magaibutsu)
- 2009: Swan Dive (Magaibutsu)
- 2011: Doldrums (with Tsuboy Akihisa) (Magaibutsu)
- 2011: Tundra (Magaibutsu/Skin Graft)
