= We're All Normal and We Want Our Freedom - A Tribute to Arthur Lee and Love =

Compilation album by various
- Released: July 12, 1994
- Genre: Psychedelic rock
- Label: Alias Records
- Producer: Peter Principle

We're All Normal And We Want Our Freedom: Tribute To Arthur Lee & Love is a 1994 tribute album for the band Love and its leader Arthur Lee. The album was named after a line in their song "The Red Telephone" from the album Forever Changes. The phrase originated in Marat/Sade, a play written by Peter Weiss.

== Track listing ==
1. Emotions - Peter Principle
2. Willow Willow - Eggs
3. Robert Montgomery - Urge Overkill
4. Message to Pretty - David Kilgour & Martin Phillipps
5. Dream - Johnson
6. Alone Again Or - Gobblehoof
7. Which Witch Is Which - Hypnolovewheel
8. ¡Que Vida! - Uncle Wiggly
9. Keep On Shine In - Diesel Meat
10. Softly to Me - The Gamma Rays
11. She Comes in Colors -The Mad Scene
12. No Matter What You Do - Love Battery
13. (Don't Turn Your) Car Lights On in the Daytime Blues - The Jetty
14. My Flash on You - Fly Ashtray
15. Signed D.C. - The Deer Team
16. Bummer in the Summer - Smack Dab
17. I'm Down - H. P. Zinker
18. Stand Out - Das Damen
19. Between Clark and Hilldale - Teenage Fanclub
20. Can't Explain - Trycycle
21. You Are Something - Television Personalities
