= Revolution on Ice =

Revolution On Ice

Studio album by Gumball
- Released: 1994
- Recorded: 1994
- Genres: Alternative rock, indie rock
- Length: 35:51
- Label: Columbia
- Producers: Don Fleming and John Agnello

Gumball chronology
Super Tasty (1993)	Revolution On Ice (1994)	Tokyo Encore (1994)

Revolution on Ice is the third and final studio album by Gumball. The album, released in 1994, was the only one featuring new member Malcolm Riviera, of Velvet Monkeys, on keyboards and guitar.

It includes a cover of Blue Öyster Cult's "She's as Beautiful as a Foot" that features original BÖC Drummer Albert Bouchard.

== Production ==
The album was recorded in Woodstock, New York, and mixed at Electric Lady Studios.

== Critical reception ==
Professional ratings
Review scores
Source	Rating
AllMusic	3/5 stars

The Baltimore Sun called the album "a straight-ahead blast of punk energy coupled with smart pop melodies."

== Track listing ==
1. "Revolution on the Rocks" - (Fleming)
2. "Free Grazin" - (Fleming)
3. "With a Little Rain" - (Fleming, Riviera)
4. "Nights on Fire" - (Fleming)
5. "Whatcha Gonna Do" - (Vermillion)
6. "Breath Away" - (Fleming)
7. "Gone to the Moon" - (Fleming)
8. "It Ain't Nothin'" - (Vermillion)
9. "Read the News" - (Fleming, Riviera)
10. "The Boat Race" - (Spiegel, Riviera)
11. "Trudge" - (Gumball)
12. "She's as Beautiful as a Foot" - (Richard Meltzer, Albert Bouchard, Allen Lanier)
13. "A Love Supreme" (John Coltrane) (Bonus Track) Japanese Only

== Personnel ==
- Don Fleming – vocals, guitar, producer
- Jay Spiegel – drums, percussion, vocals ("The Boat Race")
- Eric Vermillion – bass, vocals ("Whatcha Gonna Do" and "It Ain't Nothin'")
- Malcolm Riviera – keyboards, guitar

Technical

- John Agnello – producer, mixing
- Dan McLoughlin – assistant engineer
- Brian Sperber – mixing assistant
- John Calbi – mastering
