= The Damage Done (EP) =

EP by Gumball
- Released: 1993
- Genre: Alternative rock
- Label: Columbia

Gumball chronology
The Damage Done (EP)	Wisconsin Hayride

The Damage Done is an EP released by Gumball in 1993.

== Track listing ==
1. "The Damage Done"
2. "Thunder (Alt. Version)"
3. "Chew The Chew"
4. "Straight Line"
5. "Upsetters" (Live on VPRO National Radio Hilversum, Holland 5/11/93)
6. "Accelerator" (Re-Mixed by Thurston Moore)

== Music video listing ==
1. "The Damage Done"
2. "Accelerator"
