= Backbeat (soundtrack) =

Soundtrack album by The Backbeat Band
- Released: 8 March 1994
- Recorded: 26 March 1993
- Studio: Ocean Way Recording Studio
- Genre: Rock and roll
- Length: 27:07
- Label: EMI
- Producer: Don Was

Professional ratings
Review scores
Source	Rating
AllMusic	4/5 stars

Backbeat is the original soundtrack of the 1994 film Backbeat starring Stephen Dorff, Sheryl Lee, Gary Bakewell and Ian Hart. The music was produced by Don Was. A score based album with Don Was' original music was also released. Recording sessions for the album started on March 26, 1993 at Ocean Way Recording, in Los Angeles, California. Many of the songs on the album were first takes. Don Was stated in an interview with Variety, that "the makeshift band recorded 15 songs in three days with virtually no overdubs (except Pirner’s vocals, recorded on separate dates) and no more than two takes. “The self-imposed deadline was one of the devices that I used to keep it raw and spontaneous, so we wouldn’t scrutinize too much,” Was said. “Because at that stage the Beatles were a wild teenage band that compensated for their lack of finesse with a tremendous amount of energy". The promotional video for "Please Mr. Postman" was filmed in Germany, in March, 1994, for the UK promo single, which was released on May 3, 1994.

The album won the BAFTA Award for Best Film Music.

"The Backbeat Band" consisted of:

- Dave Pirner (Soul Asylum): vocals
- Greg Dulli (The Afghan Whigs): vocals
- Thurston Moore (Sonic Youth): guitar
- Don Fleming (Gumball): guitar
- Mike Mills (R.E.M.): bass guitar
- Dave Grohl (Nirvana): drums

== Track listing ==
1. "Money (That's What I Want)"
2. "Long Tall Sally" – Dave Pirner
3. "Bad Boy"
4. "Twist and Shout"
5. "Please Mr. Postman"
6. "C'mon Everybody" – Dave Pirner
7. "Rock & Roll Music"
8. "Slow Down"
9. "Roadrunner" – Mike Mills
10. "Carol"
11. "Good Golly Miss Molly" – Greg Dulli
12. "Twenty Flight Rock" – Dave Pirner

=== Single ===
A three-track CD single was also released of music from the soundtrack, including two songs that did not appear on the album.

1. "Money (That's What I Want)"
2. "He's Wearing My Bathrobe" (End Title)
3. "Dizzy Miss Lizzy"

=== Original soundtrack ===
An album with Don Was' original score music.

1. "You Asked, I Came"
2. "Dark Room"
3. "What Do They Call This Drink?"
4. "He's Wearing My Bathrobe"
5. "Just Read the Poems"
6. "You Asked, I Came" [Easy Version]
7. "He's Wearing My Bathrobe" (End Title)
