= Tokyo Encore =

Live album by Gumball
- Released: December 28, 1994
- Recorded: September 27, 1993
- Genre: Alternative rock, indie rock
- Length: 30:29
- Label: T.E.C. Tones

Gumball chronology
Revolution on Ice (1994)	Tokyo Encore (1994)

Tokyo Encore was the final release by Gumball. After leaving Columbia Records at the end of 1994, the band released a live album compiled from the band's 1993 tour of Japan and sold through their fan club on their own T.E.C. Tones label. Gumball were joined on stage by members of Shonen Knife during the performance. The album features live covers of songs by The Beatles, Deep Purple, and the Germs.

While on tour in Japan in 1993, Gumball made 16 track recordings of each of their Club Quattro performances. These nightclubs featured built-in multi-track recording which made it quite easy for the band to make high quality recordings of the performances. The music was in part a nod to Japan's relationship with Western rock music of the 1970s. At each gig, Gumball performed Cheap Trick's "Hello There" (made famous on Cheap Trick's live At Budokan album) and Deep Purple's "Smoke on the Water" (from their live Made in Japan release). The shows also had local Japanese bands as opening acts, and when possible featured members of Japan's Shonen Knife on stage for the encore.

Video footage from the shows ended up in two videos later shown on MTV: "The Damage Done" and "Revolution on the Rocks".

== Track listing ==
1. "Hello There & Depression"
2. "Gettysburg" (Vermillion)
3. "Alternate Feed" (Fleming)
4. "Caught in My Eye" (Darby Crash)
5. "Upsetters Theme Song" (Gumball)
6. "Why Don't We Do It in the Road?" (John Lennon, PaulMcCartney)
7. "Smoke on the Water" (Ritchie Blackmore, Ian Gillan, Roger Glover, Jon Lord, Ian Paice)
8. "Final Upsetters"

== Personnel ==
- Don Fleming - vocals, guitar
- Jay Spiegel - drums
- Eric Vermillion - bass
- Malcolm Riviera - keyboards
- Tammi Colichio - design
- John Hansen - drums
- Ken Kamenoi - technical support
- Dave Markey - drums
- Atsuko Yamano - percussion, vocals
- Naoko Yamano - guitar
- Michie Nakatani - bass, percussion, vocals
- Rico - vocals
- Rum - vocals
- Katsuaki " Yaggi" Yagihashi - technical support
