= Tatsuya Yoshida =

Japanese musician

Tatsuya Yoshida 吉田達也
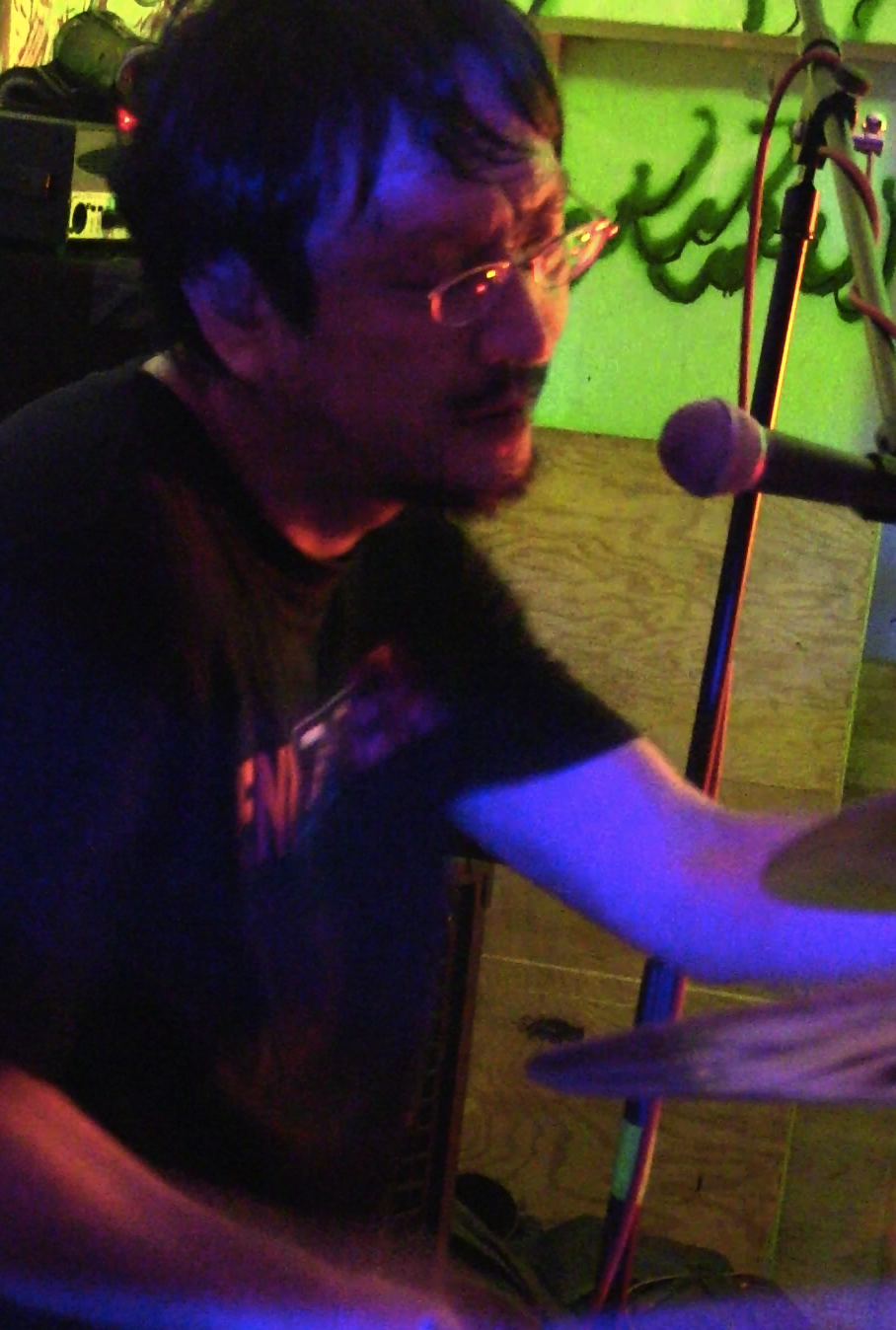
- Yoshida at Death By Audio in 2012

Background information
- Born: January 9, 1961 (age 64); Kitakami, Iwate, Japan
- Occupations: Musician; composer
- Instruments: Drums; vocals; keyboards; guitar
- Member of: Ruins; Zeni Geva; Koenji Hyakkei; Korekyojinn; Daimonji; Samla Mammas Manna; Acid Mothers Temple SWR
- Website: magaibutsu.com

Tatsuya Yoshida (吉田達也, Yoshida Tatsuya) (born 9 January 1961) is a Japanese musician, drummer and composer who is the only consistent member of the renowned progressive rock duo Ruins, as well as of Koenji Hyakkei. He is also a member of the progressive rock trios Korekyojinn and Daimonji. Outside his own groups, Yoshida is renowned for his tenure as drummer in the indie progressive group YBO2, a band also featuring guitarist KK Null, whom he also joins in the current line-up of Zeni Geva and he has played drums in a late edition of Samla Mammas Manna. Since 2001, he and bass guitarist Takeharu Hayakawa have worked with jazz pianist Satoko Fujii and trumpeter Natsuki Tamura in the Satoko Fujii Quartet. He has been cited as "[the] indisputable master drummer of the Japanese underground".

Along with his participation in bands, he has also released several solo recordings.

== Discography ==
- Solo Works '88 (1988)
- Solo Works '89 (1989)
- Magaibutsu '91 (1991)
- Drums, Voices, Keyboards & Guitar (1994)
- Pianoworks '94 (1994)
- First Meeting (1995)
- A Million Years (1997)
- A Is for Accident (1997)
- PYN - songs for children who don't want to sleep (2015)
- PYN - L'élan créateur (2016)

With Ruins

- Ruins III (1988) (reissued as Infect in 1993)
- Stonehenge (1990)
- Burning Stone (1992)
- Graviyaunosch (1993)
- Hyderomastgroningem (1995)
- Refusal Fossil (1997/2007)
- Vrresto (1998)
- Symphonica (1998)
- Pallaschtom (2000)
- Tzomborgha (2002)
- Alone (2011)

With Koenji Hyakkei

- Hundred Sights of Koenji (高円寺百景) (1994, remastered and reissued in 2008)
- Viva Koenji! (弐(II)) (1997)
- Nivraym (2001, remastered and reissued in 2009)
- Angherr Shisspa (2005)
- Dhorimviskha (2018)

With Painkiller

- The Prophecy: Live in Europe (Tzadik, 2013)

With Ron Anderson

- RonRuins
- NYJPN

With The Gerogerigegege

- Instruments Disorder (1994)

With Satoko Fujii Quartet

- Vulcan (2001)
- Minerva (2002)
- Zephyros (2003)
- Angelona (2004)
- Bacchus (2006)
- Dog Days of Summer (2024)

With Satoko Fujii/Tatsuya Yoshida Duo

- Toh-Kichi (2002)
- Erans (2003)
- Baikamo (2019)

With Acid Mothers Temple SWR

- SWR (2005)
- Stones, Women & Records (2007)
- Sax & the City (2011)
- Stones, Women and Records at Taku Taku 2009 (2011)
- Yes, No & Perhaps (2014)
