= Gumball (band) =

American rock band

- Origin: United States
- Genres: Alternative rock, post-punk, grunge
- Years active: 1990–1994
- Labels: Columbia, Primo Scree, Paperhouse, Dry Hump Records
- Members: Don Fleming; Jay Spiegel; Eric Vermillion; Malcolm Riviera (d. 2023)

Gumball was an American rock band formed in New York City in 1990. The original lineup consisted of Don Fleming (vocals and guitar), Eric Vermillion (vocals, bass), and Jay Spiegel (drums). In 1992, a fourth member was added, Malcolm Riviera (guitar, keyboards) who had previously played with Fleming and Spiegel in the Velvet Monkeys.

== History ==
After Fleming and Spiegel's group B.A.L.L. broke up in 1990, the duo briefly joined Dinosaur Jr. and released one single on the Sub Pop label. The two left Dinosaur Jr. shortly after the release of the single. Jay Spiegel approached his friend Eric Vermillion, a member of Camp Hill, PA's The Stump Wizards, about playing with the two. Vermillion agreed and subsequently quit The Stump Wizards. After less than a week's rehearsal, the new trio played its first show and Gumball was born.

The fall of 1990 found Gumball in the studio, and their first release came out shortly thereafter on the Paperhouse/Sire label in England. The release was a 12 inch EP with the songs "All the Time"/"Yellow Pants"/"Gettysburg".

Gumball soon found itself with a record deal with New York City's Caroline Records. They recorded and released the album Special Kiss and embarked on a tour with Mudhoney, Sonic Youth, and other similar American indie bands of the early 1990s.

In 1991, Gumball was approached by Columbia Records A&R man Jim Dunbar about signing to the label for a two-album contract. Soon thereafter, the deal was signed and Gumball immediately re-entered the studio and began recording their major label debut, Super Tasty. The sessions were done in Wisconsin with producer Butch Vig, who earlier engineered Nirvana's major label debut Nevermind.

Although Gumball recorded Super Tasty as a trio, fourth member (and longtime musical associate) Malcolm Riviera joined the band shortly after the album's release. The foursome began rehearsing and in early 1993 toured in support of the album.

After a tour of the U.S., Europe, and Japan, Gumball returned to the studio in the fall of 1993 to record their second album for Columbia, Revolution on Ice. The album was released by Columbia/Sony in 1994 and the band toured in support of it throughout that year.

Columbia exercised its option to drop Gumball from its roster after low sales from Revolution on Ice. The band released a live CD on their own label in late 1994 called Tokyo Encore, but by early 1995 the band had decided to call it quits rather than begin shopping for another label.

In early August 2023, the band announced through social media that Riviera, keyboardist and guitarist for the band, died the previous weekend in July.

== Band members ==
- Don Fleming – (guitar, vocals)
- Eric Vermillion – (bass, vocals)
- Jay Spiegel – (drums)
- Malcolm Riviera – (keyboard, guitar) (died July, 2023)

== Discography ==
=== Albums ===
Title	Release date	Label
Special Kiss	1991	Primo Scree
Super Tasty	1993	Columbia
Revolution on Ice	1994	Columbia
Tokyo Encore	1994	T.E.C. Tones

=== EPs ===
The Damage Done	1993	Columbia
Wisconsin Hayride	1992	Columbia

=== Singles ===
Year	Title	Album	Label
1990	"All The Time"	Special Kiss	Paperhouse
1991	"Sonic Youth / Gumball / Laughing Hyenas / These Immortal Souls: Sub Pop Singles Club No. 121"		Subpop
1991	"This Town"	Special Kiss	Paperhouse
1991	"Light Shines Through"		Paperhouse/Waterfront Recordings
1992	"Girl Don't Tell Me/ Strawberry Fields Forever"		Get Hip Recordings
1992	"New Rose"	Wisconsin Hayride	Columbia
1993	"Accelerator"	Super Tasty	Columbia
1993	"The Damage Done"	Super Tasty	Columbia
1993	"Real Gone Deal"	Super Tasty	Columbia
1994	"Nights on Fire"	Revolution on Ice	Columbia
1994	"Whatcha Gonna Do / Read The News"		Dry Hump
1994	"Whatcha Gonna Do"	Revolution on Ice	Columbia

=== Music videos ===
Year	Title	Director
1992	"New Rose"	Dave Markey
1993	"Accelerator"	Dave Markey
1993	"The Damage Done"	Dave Markey
1993	"Real Gone Deal"	Casey Niccoli
1994	"Revolution on the Rocks"	Dave Markey
