= Rutles Highway Revisited =

Compilation album of cover songs by Various artists
- Released: 1990
- Recorded: Noise New York (New York City, NY)
- Genre: Experimental rock
- Length: 60:09
- Label: Shimmy Disc
- Producer: Kramer

Professional ratings
Review scores
Source	Rating
Allmusic	4/5 stars

Rutles Highway Revisited is a various artists compilation album, released in 1990 by Shimmy Disc. It comprises cover versions of songs recorded by The Rutles. The album title is a reference to the 1965 Bob Dylan album Highway 61 Revisited.

== Track listing ==
No.	Title	Artist	Length
1.	"Cheese and Onions"	Galaxie 500	3:08
2.	"Hold My Hand"	The Pussywillows	2:06
3.	"Number One"	Bongos, Bass & Bob	2:50
4.	"Good Times Roll"	Lida Husik	3:58
5.	"Another Day"	Dogbowl	3:09
6.	"Piggy in the Middle"	Das Damen	4:33
7.	"I Must Be in Love"	Syd Straw & Marc Ribot	2:32
8.	"Nevertheless"	Joey Arias	3:52
9.	"Let's Be Natural"	When People Were Shorter and Lived Near the Water	3:24
10.	"Between Us"	Unrest	2:05
11.	"Ouch!"	Peter Stampfel & the Bottlecaps	1:29
12.	"Blue Suede Schubert"	The Tinklers	3:23
13.	"Living in Hope"	Tuli Kupferberg	2:56
14.	"Baby Let Me Be"	Daniel Johnston	3:01
15.	"It's Looking Good"	Uncle Wiggly	2:22
16.	"Goose Step Mama"	Shonen Knife	2:34
17.	"Get Up and Go"	Jellyfish Kiss	2:25
18.	"Doubleback Alley"	King Missile	2:48
19.	"With a Girl Like You"	Paleface	3:28
20.	"Love Life"	Bongwater	4:06

== Personnel ==
Adapted from the Rutles Highway Revisited liner notes.

- Kramer – production, engineering

== Release history ==
Region	Date	Label	Format	Catalog
United States	1990	Shimmy Disc	CD, LP	shimmy 041
Netherlands	1990	Shimmy Disc	CD	SDE 9028
