= Viva Koenji! =

弐(II)

Studio album by Kōenji Hyakkei
- Released: 1997
- Genres: Zeuhl, progressive rock
- Length: 58:17
- Label: God Mountain

Kōenji Hyakkei chronology
高円寺百景 (1994)	弐(II) (1997)	Nivraym (2001)

Professional ratings
Review scores
Source	Rating
Allmusic	4.5/5 stars

弐(II), also known as Viva Koenji! and 2 (ni) is the second studio album by the band Kōenji Hyakkei.

== Track listing ==
No.	Title	Writer(s)	Length
1.	"Grembo Zavia"	Yoshida	10:14
2.	"Graddinoba Revoss"	Yoshida, Harada	4:28
3.	"Sllina Vezom"	Yoshida	5:28
4.	"Quidom"	Yoshida	3:43
5.	"Aramidda Horva"	Yoshida	5:53
6.	"Brahggo"	Koenjihyakkei	4:48
7.	"Cembell Rotta"	Lyrics: Yoshida, Music: Kubota	3:42
8.	"Rissenddo Rraimb"	Yoshida	9:17
9.	"Guoth Dahha"	Lyrics: Kubota, Music: Yoshida	9:25
10.	"Pamillazze"	Yoshida	1:19

== Personnel ==
- Tatsuya Yoshida – drums, keyboards, vocals
- Sakamoto Kengo – bass, vocals
- Kubota Aki – vocals, keyboards
- Harada Jin – guitars, vocals
