= Satoko Fujii =

Japanese jazz pianist, accordionist and composer

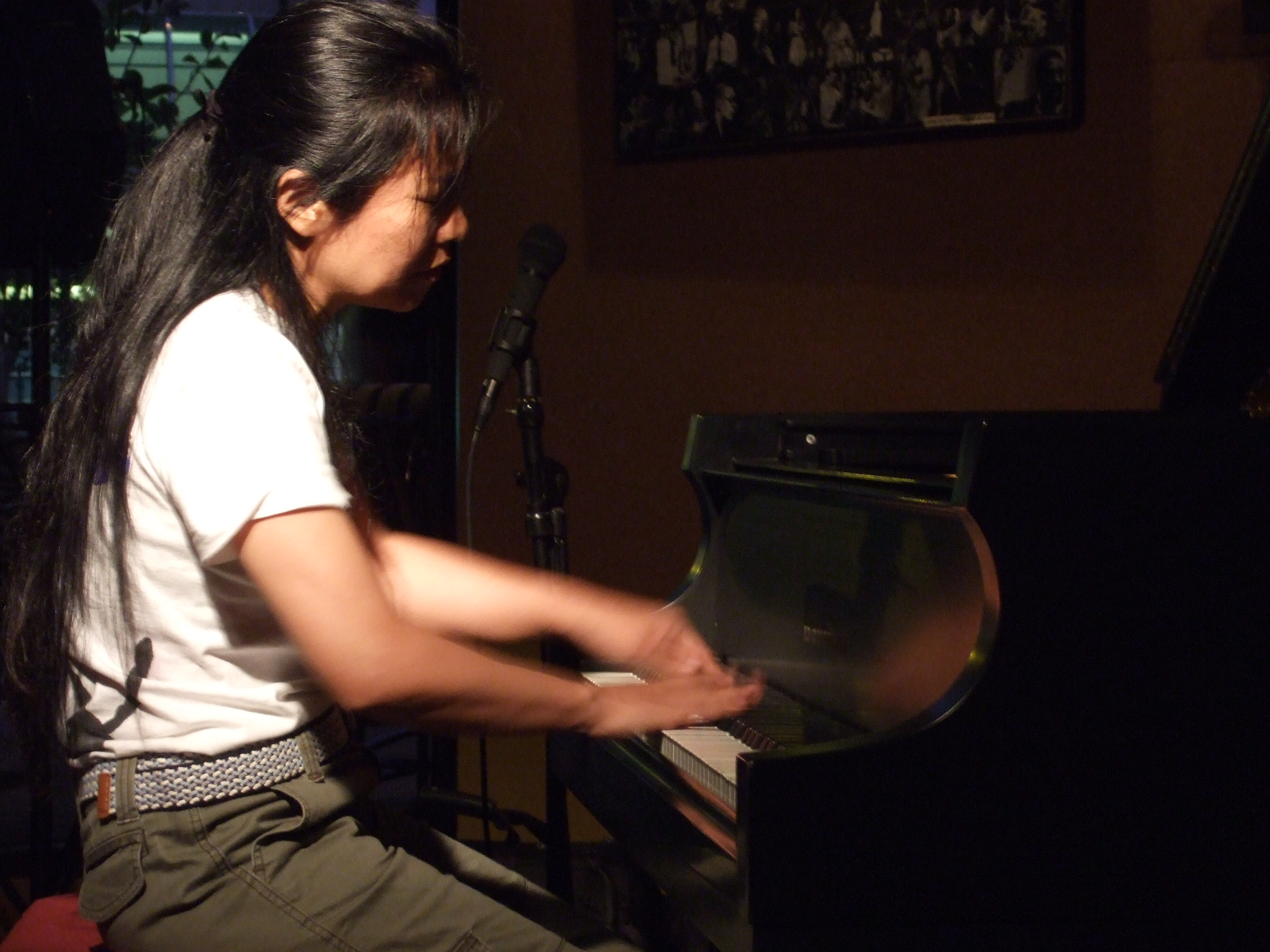
- Fujii in San Diego in September 2008.

Background information
- Born: Satoko Fujii (藤井郷子, Fujii Satoko); 9 October 1958 (age 67); Tokyo, Japan
- Genres: Jazz
- Occupations: Musician, composer
- Instruments: Piano, accordion
- Website: satokofujii.com/eindex

Satoko Fujii (藤井郷子, Fujii Satoko; born 9 October 1958) is a Japanese avant-garde jazz pianist, accordionist and composer.

== Early life ==
Fujii was born in Tokyo on 9 October 1958. She started playing the piano at age 4, receiving classical training until she was 20, when she became interested in improvisation and jazz. In her twenties, she received instruction in jazz from pianist Fumio Itabashi in Tokyo.

== Later life and career ==
Fujii went to the United States in 1985, graduating from the Berklee College of Music in Boston in 1987, returning to the US in 1993, achieving a graduate diploma in Jazz Performance from the New England Conservatory of Music in 1996. While at the Conservatory, she also had lessons with pianist Paul Bley, "which consisted largely of conversation over cappuccinos, [and] eased her toward self-expression." In 1996, their duo album, Something About Water, was released; Fujii commented that it was a major event for her: "I started to accept myself, little by little." She returned to Japan with her new husband, trumpeter Natsuki Tamura, leader of Gato Libre. She leads various big bands in Japan, such as Orchestra Tokyo. She established Orchestra New York in 1997.

Around 2007, the quartet ma-do was created, consisting of Fujii, Tamura, bassist Norikatsu Koreyasu and drummer Akira Horikoshi. In 2010, Fujii co-founded Kaze, a group containing herself, Tamura, trumpeter Christian Pruvost and drummer Peter Orins. She has played accordion on recordings by the band established by Tamura, Gato Libre, including DuDu and Kuro.

Fujii has recorded prolifically: between 1996 and 2009 she released more than 40 albums. In 2018, she released an album every month to celebrate turning 60.

Since the beginning of the COVID-19 pandemic, Fujii and Tamura have been releasing albums recorded in their home studio on Bandcamp on a regular (monthly or bi-monthly) basis.

In December 2022, Fujii released the 100th album under her own name, auspiciously entitled “Hyaku One Hundred Dreams”.

== Playing style ==
The Down Beat reviewer of Under the Water, a piano duet album with Myra Melford, stated that "Fujii varies dynamics widely, jump-cutting from a fierce, free barrage to a sprinkle of single, crystalline notes."

== Discography ==
Satoko Fujii Discography (as of May 2025)
Title	Year	Label	Catalog #	Other details
Something About Water	1996	Libra Records	202-002	Duet featuring Paul Bley
Indication	1996	Libra Records	202-003	Piano solo
How many	1997	Libra Records	102-103	First duet album with Natsuki Tamura on trumpet
Looking Out Of The Window	1997	Ninety-One	CRCJ-9139	Trio featuring Mark Dresser, bass; Jim Black, drummer
South Wind	1997	Libra Records	215-104	First Satoko Fujii Orchestra album
Past Life	1998	Libra Records	206-004	Satoko Fujii Sextet
Kitsune-bi	1999	Tzadik	TZ 7220	piano solo, Trio featuring Mark Dresser, Jim Black, with Sachi Hayasaka on soprano saxophone
Jo	1999	Buzz Records	ZZ76008	Satoko Fujii Orchestra New York
Toward, 'To West'	1999	ENJA Records	ENJ 93822	Trio featuring Mark Dresser, bass; Jim Black
Double Take	2000	EWE Records	EW0019/20	Orchestra East/Orchestra West
April Shower	2001	EWE Records	EWCC 0006	Featuring Mark Feldman, violin
Junction	2001	EWE Records	EWCC 0034	Trio featuring Mark Dresser and Jim Black
Vulcan	2001	Libra Records	204-005	Satoko Fujii Quartet
Clouds	2001	Libra Records	102-006	Natsuki Tamura and Satoko Fujii duet
The Future of the Past	2002	ENJA Records	ENJ-94572	Satoko Fujii Orchestra New York
Bell The Cat!	2002	on off	TKCB-72369	Trio featuring Mark Dresser, bass; Jim Black, drummer
Minerva	2003	Libra Records	204-007	Satoko Fujii Quartet
Toh-Kichi (藤吉)	2002	Les Disques Victo	VICTO CD 083	Featuring Tatsuya Yoshida, drums and voice
Before the Dawn	2003	NatSat Music	MTCJ 3010	Satoko Fujii Orchestra East (Tokyo)
Zephyros	2003	NatSat Music	MTCJ 3011	Satoko Fujii Quartet
Blueprint	2004	NatSat Music	MTCJ 3016	Satoko Fujii Orchestra New York
Illusion Suite	2004	Libra Records	203-009	Satoko Fujii Trio
Nagoyanian	2004	Bakamo	BKM 001	Satoko Fujii Orchestra Nagoya
Erans	2004	Tzadik	TZ 7247	Featuring Tatsuya Yoshida, drums and voice
Sketches	2004	Natsat Music	MTCJ-3013	piano solo
In the Tank	2005	Libra Records	104-011	Featuring Takayuki Kato, Elliott Sharp, Natsuki Tamura
Fragment	2006	Libra Records	203-013	Junk Box
Strange Village	2005	on off	MZCO 1073	Gato Libre
Live in Japan	2005	NatSat Music	MTCJ 3022	Satoko Fujii Four
Angelona	2005	Libra Records	204-014	Satoko Fujii Quartet
Live!!	2006	Libra Records	205-015/016	Satoko Fujii Orchestra Tokyo
Undulation	2006	Polystar	CJ 3032	Satoko Fujii Orchestra New York
When We Were There	2006	Polystar	CJ 3034	Satoko Fujii Four
Crossword Puzzle	2007	Libra Records	104-017	Double duo (Tamura/Verploegen/Mengelberg/Fujii)
in Krakow in November	2006	Not Two	MW 774-2	Natsuki Tamura and Satoko Fujii duo
Kobe Yee!!	2006	Crab Apple records	002	Satoko Fujii Orchestra Kobe
Maru	2006	Bakamo	BKM-005	Satoko Fujii Orchestra Nagoya
Nomad	2006	on off	MZCO-1103	Gato Libre
Fujin Raijin	2007	VICTO	CD 105	Satoko Fujii Min-Yoh Ensemble
Bacchus	2007	on off	MZCO 1136	Satoko Fujii Quartet
Minamo	2007	Henceforth Records	105	Featuring Carla Kihlstedt, violin
Kuro	2008	Libra Records	104-018	Gato Libre
Cloudy Then Sunny	2008	Libra Records	203-019	Junk Box
Trace a River	2008	Libra Records	203-020	Satoko Fujii Trio
Sanrei	2008	Bakamo	KM 007	Satoko Fujii Orchestra Nagoya
Heat Wave	2008	Libra Records	204-021	Satoko Fujii ma-do
Chun	2008	Libra Records	102-022	Natsuki Tamura and Satoko Fujii duo
Summer Suite	2008	Libra Records	215-023	Satoko Fujii Orchestra New York
Under the Water	2009	Libra Records	202-024	Satoko Fujii and Myra Melford
Kuroi Kawa	2009	Tzadik	7720-2	Minamo
Cut the Rope	2009	Libra Records	104-025	First Meeting (Tamura/Churko/Fujii/Yamamoto)
Desert Ship	2009	Not Two	MW 826-2	Satoko Fujii ma-do
Shiro	2009	Libra Records	104-026	Gato Libre
Zakopane	2010	Libra Records	216-027	Satoko Fujii Orchestra Tokyo
Watershed	2011	Libra Records	204-028	Satoko Fujii Min-Yoh Ensemble
Eto	2011	Libra Records	215-029	Satoko Fujii Orchestra New York
Rafale	2011	Circum-Libra	201	Kaze (Tamura/Pruvost/Fujii/Orins)
Forever	2012	Libra Records	104-030	Gato Libre
Muku	2012	Libra Records	102-031	Natsuki Tamura and Satoko Fujii duo
Time stands still	2013	Not Two	MW 897-2	ma-do
Gen Himmel	2013	Libra Records	201-033	piano solo
Tornado	2013	Circum-Libra	202	Kaze
Spring Storm	2013	Libra Records	203-034	Satoko Fujii New Trio
DuDu	2014	Libra Records	104-035	Gato Libre
Shiki	2014	Libra Records	215-036	Satoko Fujii Orchestra New York
Ichigo Ichie	2015	Libra Records	212-037	Satoko Fujii Orchestra Berlin
Yamiyo ni Karasu	2015	Libra Records	204-038	Tobira
Uminari	2015	Circum-Libra	203	Kaze
Peace (Tribute to Kelly Churko)	2016	Libra Records	217-039	Satoko Fujii Orchestra Tokyo + Kaze
Duet	2016	Long Song	LSRCD 140	Satoko Fujii, Joe Fonda with Natsuki Tamura
Invisible Hand	2016	Cortez Sound	CSJ0001/0002	piano solo
Neko	2017	Libra Records	104-040 (041 vinyl)	Gato Libre
Kisaragi	2017	Libra Records	102-042	Natsuki Tamura and Satoko Fujii duo
June	2017	Circum-Libra	LX 009	Trouble Kaze
Live at Jazz Room Cortez	2017	Cortez Sound	CSJ0005	Satoko Fujii Quartet (Fujii/Tamura/Itani and Ota)
Aspiration	2017	Libra Records	204-043	Fujii/Tamura/Wadada Leo Smith/Ikue Mori
Fukushima	2017	Libra Records	214-044 (045 vocal version)	Satoko Fujii Orchestra NY
Solo	2018	Libra Records	201-046	piano solo
Atody Man	2018	Circum-Libra	204	Kaze
Mizu	2018	Long Song Records	LSCD 045	Satoko Fujii & Joe Fonda
Ninety-nine Years	2018	Libra Records	211-047	Satoko Fujii Orchestra Berlin
Bright Force	2018	Libra Records	204-048	Kira Kira (Fujii/Tamura/Spence/Takemura)
1538	2018	Libra Records	203-049	This is it! (Fujii/Tamura/Itani)
Triad	2018	Long Song Records	LSCD 042	Fujii, Fonda & Mimmo
Intelsat	2018	Alister Spence Music	ASM 007	Fujii & Spence
Live at Big Apple in Kobe	2018	Libra Records	204-050	Mahobin (Fujii/Tamura/Mori/Anker)
Weave	2018	Libra Records	204-051 (052 DVD)	Amu (Wildenhahn/Fujii/Tamura/Itani)
Kikoeru: Tribute to Masaya Kimura	2018	Libra Records	215-055	Satoko Fujii Orchestra Tokyo
Imagine meeting you here	2019	Alister Spence Music	ASM 008	Satoko Fujii Orchestra Kobe
Stone	2019	Libra Records	201-056	piano solo (treated)
Confluence	2019	Libra Records	202-057	Satoko Fujii and Ramon Lopez
Entity	2019	Libra Records	214-058	Satoko Fujii Orchestra NY
Four	2019	Long Song Records	LSRCD 151	Satoko Fujii and Joe Fonda
Baikamo	2019	Libra Records	202-059	Tohkichi (Fujii and Yoshida)
Koneko	2020	Libra Records	103-060	Gato Libre
Pentas	2020	Not Two Records	MW 999	Natsuki Tamura and Satoko Fujii duo
Beyond	2020	Libra Records	202-061	Futari (Satoko Fujii and Taiko Saito)
Sand Storm	2020	Circum-Libra	205	Kaze & Ikue Mori
Prickly Pear Cactus	2020	Libra Records	203-062	Ikue Mori, Satoko Fujii & Natsuki Tamura
Hazuki	2020	Libra Records	201-063	piano solo
Mantle	2020	Not Two Records	MW 1003	Satoko Fujii, Natsuki Tamura, Ramon Lopez
Keshin	2020	Libra Records	102-064	Natsuki Tamura and Satoko Fujii duo
Moon on the Lake	2021	Libra Records	203-065	Satoko Fujii Tokyo Trio
Piano Music	2021	Libra Records	203-067	Satoko Fujii
Underground	2021	Libra Records	203-068	Futari (Satoko Fujii and Taiko Saito)
Mosaic	2021	Libra Records	203-069	This is it!
Any News	2021	Alister Spence Music		Fujii & Spence
Thread of Light	2022	Fundacja Slucha!		Satoko Fujii & Joe Fonda
Hyaku One Hundred Dreams	2022	Libra Records	209-071	Satoko Fujii, Ingrid Laubrock, Sara Schoenbeck, Wadada Leo Smith, Natsuki Tamura, Ikue Mori, Brandon Lopez, Tom Rainey, Chris Corsano
Perpetual Motion	2023	Ayler Records	AYLCD-175	Satoko Fujii/Yoshihide Otomo
Crustal Movement	2023	Circum-Libra	206	Kaze & Ikue Mori
Torrent	2023	Libra Records	201-072	Satoko Fujii
Hibiki	2023	Jazzdor	0001/20	Trio San (Fujii, Saito, Oshima)
Jet Black	2024	Libra Records	203-073	Satoko Fujii Tokyo Trio
Unwritten	2024	Circum-Libra	207	Kaze
Aloft	2024	Libra Records	102-075	Natsuki Tamura and Satoko Fujii duo
Kira Kira LIve	2024	Alister Spence Music	ASM015	Kira Kira
Dog Days of Summer	2024	Libra Records	204-076	Satoko Fujii Quartet
Yama Kawa Umi	2024	Not Two Records	MW1041-2	Satoko Fujii, Natsuki Tamura, Ramon Lopez
Dream a dream	2025	Libra Records	203-079	Satoko Fujii Tokyo Trio
Message	2025	Libra Records	203-080	This is it!
Shishiodoshi	2025	Circum-Libra	208	Kaze & Koichi Makigami
Ki 樹	2025	Libra Records	102-081	Natsuki Tamura Satoko Fujii
Burning Wick	2025	Libra Records	204-082	Satoko Fujii Quartet
Katarahi	2026	RogueArt Records	ROG-0149	Satoko Fujii - Myra Melford
Bunker Orchestra Ulmenwall	2026	Libra Records	218-083	Satoko Fujii's Bunker Ulmenwall Orchestra

BANDCAMP RELEASES
July 2020 - Emaki/Solo improv
August 2020 - Midsummer
September 2020 - Solo concert
December 2020 - Futari at Guggenheim House
February 2021 - Morning dream
March 2021 - Step on thin ice
April 2021 - Piano music Vol. 1
May 2021 - Piano music Vol. 2
July 2021 - Underground Vol. 1 (Futari)
August 2021 - Underground Vol. 2 (Futari)
October 2021 - Underground Vol. 3 (Futari)
November 2021 - Hajimeru
February 2022 - when you turn off the light Vol. 1
March 2022 - when you turn off the light Vol. 2
April 2022 - when you turn off the light Vol. 3
April 2022 - Bokyaku
April 2023 - 342: Live in Tokyo
May 2023 - Amanojaku
August 2023 - After Fifteen Years
September 2023 - Tsuki
November 2023 - Hakuro
October 2024 - Bishamonten
