= So Wrong They're Right =

- Directed by: Russ Forster
- Produced by: Russ Forster
- Starring: Malcolm Riviera; Abigail Lavine; Tim Hunter; Phil X. Milstein; Doug Von Hoppe; Duane Thamm Jr.
- Cinematography: Dan Sutherland
- Edited by: Russ Forster
- Music by: Lary 7, Wally Pleasant, Bob Jordan, Mr. Bucks, Duane Thamm Jr.
- Release date: 1995
- Running time: 92 mins
- Country: United States

So Wrong They're Right is a 1995 film by Russ Forster. It is about the latter day 8-track scene, the people who are part of it and their passion for the technology.

== Background ==
Film makers Russ Forster and Dan Sutherland travelled to various places in the United States to interview aficionados of what is considered to be an obsolete audio format, the 8-Track tape cartridge.

The 8-TM production was Produced, directed, edited, sound-recorded by Russ Forster. Dan Sutherland handled the lighting chores while the sound chores were handled by Jerrell Frederick.

The film won an award for best feature-length documentary at the 1995 Chicago Underground Film Festival.

The film was available in both Betamax and VHS formats for $25 and in PAL format for foreign buyers at $35. It was released on DVD in 2005 by Other Cinema.

Russ Forster was the founder of the magazine, 8-Track Mind as well as one of the founders of the 8-Track Heaven website.

== Reception ==
Dennis Harvey of Variety reviewed the film and it was published on 12 August 1996. After pointing out that the film was about audiophiles who were obsessed with a defunct format, he wrote that it was edited in a lively style, but he suggested that it could be edited down to accommodate its showing in other venues.

The film had a review in volume II of Zines!. The reviewer wrote that it wasn't about nostalgia, but it rather served as a statement of outrage by consumers who were tired of being told what to consume.

The film was reviewed by PopMatters in 2005. Reviewer David Sanjek wrote that director Forster demonstrated the exuberance of a true believer and the film proved to be more entertaining than edifying. He also wrote that the subjects in the film possessed an exuberance that was giddy and parts of the film were outright engaging.

In 2007, Gary Genosko of Culture Machine wrote that the film "may be viewed as a psychoanalytic case study of a neurotic 'cartridge family'".

It was reviewed by 5Mag in 2014, with the reviewer writing, "This film is a treasure, one of the strangest, most bizarre, most fascinating music documentaries ever made".

The film now on DVD was reviewed in XLR8R magazine. It wasn't complementary.

== Credits ==
=== Cast (selective) ===
- Malcolm Riviera
- Abigail Lavine
- Tim Hunter
- Phil X. Milstein
- Doug Von Hoppe
- Duane Thamm Jr.

=== Crew ===
- Producer, Director, Sound Recordist, Editor: Russ Forster
- Cinematography, Lighting: Dan Sutherland
- Sound Mix: Jerrell Frederick
- Soundtrack Music: Lary 7, Wally Pleasant, Bob Jordan, Mr. Bucks, Duane Thamm Jr., Scott Konzelmann

== Screenings ==
According to Underdog magazine, issue XIII (autumn 1995), the showings for the film were 9 September at Artists' Television Access, 992 Valencia, San Francisco, CA; 12 September at Paris Theatre, Portland, OR (tentative); 19 September, 8 and 10 pm at Edison Gallery of Moving Images, 916 Commercial Dr, Sep. 19: Vancouver, BC; 21 September at Cuppernicus, Minneapolis, MN (tentative); and 24 September at Delilah's, Chicago, IL.
