= Semibeings =

American alternative rock band

The Semibeings were an alternative rock band based in Mercerville-Hamilton Square, New Jersey, and active in the 1990s. The band released Sickness and Health on Shimmy Disc in 1995 and Three Pawns Standing on Seattle’s C/Z label in 1997, both produced by Mark Kramer and recorded at his Noise New Jersey studio. The band’s primary members were brother’s Joe and Pat Baker and Keith Monacchio. Playing numerous shows at the City Gardens club in Trenton, the group disbanded in 1999 to pursue other interests. The Semibeings' music was featured on a number of seasons of MTV's The Real World and Road Rules during the 1990s.

== Beginnings ==
It can be said that The Semibeings started with the pseudo band “The Political Manifestos” in 1989. Joseph Baker and Keith Monacchio became friends while attending Notre Dame High School in Lawrenceville, New Jersey, during the 80's. Joe and brother Pat were involved in music from an early age. Joe purportedly has hundreds of cassette tapes filled with homemade albums he has made with the assistance of his brother from 1980 to the present including homemade album covers and liner notes for each. Irrationally fearing the criticism he felt he would receive if his peers knew of his hobby, Joe had kept this other life "in the closet" till he chose to reveal his secret to Keith who was interested in much of the same music Joe was into. Keith who was known around school as having a great singing voice had aspired to get involved with music himself but had never had the opportunity until he discovered Joe's secret. While living at Long Beach Island, N.J. during the summer of 1989, Joe and Keith started writing songs together and recording them on cassette tapes as “albums” in the same way Joe had previously been doing and titled their band “The Political Manifestos”. During this time, Patrick Baker who had developed into a truly gifted guitarist and musician in his own right was busy with the role of lead guitarist as one of the original members of the local hard-core band Mouthpiece, co-writing their first EP.

After spending several years writing and recording music together just for its own sake, feeling that their music was good enough that others would like it, Keith persuaded Joe to try their hands at truly coming out of the closet and having a go professionally. Joe, who feared they would be ridiculed decided that at 20 years old it was "now or never" and decided to give it his best effort. However, Keith had the voice but couldn't play any musical instruments, while Joe had the creative ideas and wrote the songs but as a musician he was technically limited so it was inevitable that Pat should join. They originally called the band “The Jamboree”. After secretly rehearsing as a 3-piece for about 3 months, they played their first official show at Stevie T's in Trenton in November 1991 playing a mixture of covers (from the likes of Jane's Addiction and R.E.M.) and originals.

== Etymology ==
The band continued to play shows and during a brainstorming session with Keith, Joe came up with the name “Semibeings” to title the band based on the idea that as people they perhaps were not living as fully or to their potential thus “semi-being”. It was also a pun about being crazy; i.e. someone who is not quite “all there”. The word is only now starting to be used in the vernacular and as yet cannot be traced to being used before the band.

== Demos as art ==
At the time bands recorded “demos” which were usually cassette tapes consisting of 2 to 4 of the group's best songs to send around to clubs or labels for potential shows or interest. The threesome decided to reinvent the demo format by recording full-length albums right away and sending those out in their entirety as their “demos”. The band's first album was the self-titled “The Semibeings” released in early 1992 and which contained 8 songs followed later that year by the 17 song An Emotional Buffet both self-produced and recorded at SS Sound Studios in Hamilton, N.J. under the tutelage of the studio's owner and engineer John Bailey whom the band affectionately nicknamed “Mama”. “The Semibeings” was more of a folk oriented album consisting of Keith and Joe sharing lead vocals with Joe and Pat sharing guitar duties and Pat handling the bass. All songs were written by Joe or with Joe and Keith collaborating on lyrics to Joe's music. Wanting to make the music that was closer to their hearts; that being rock music, Joe, Pat and Keith realized that they needed to expand the band to include a full-time bassist and drummer. Tom McDonald joined as bassist and Dave Von Bargen joined as drummer, both having been friend's of Pat's and involved in the local basement music scene in Hamilton. Pat, Tom and Dave had previously formed the metal-based band Spiritual Sky, having opened for White Zombie at the Fastlanes in Asbury Park, N.J. in the early nineties.

The follow-up to the first album was recorded as a five-piece. Titled “An Emotional Buffet”, it wound up becoming a local classic. The tape even garnered attention from Alternative Press who wrote “This release is truly one eclectic gem. There are lots of surprises in the seventeen songs. I was seduced to keep listening to each and every one” (AP July 1994). The band's philosophy of sending out full-length albums as demos seemed like suicide to most, but wound up paying off for upon listening to “An Emotional Buffet” local promoter Randy Now i.e.; (Randy Ellis) decided to book them as an opening act for the band Live at City Gardens. An unsigned local band opening up for national acts at the club was fairly unprecedented at the time, The Semibeings over the ensuing years opened for various national band's at City Gardens including Jawbox, Shudder To Think, The Poster Children, and Superchunk as well as headlining at the club.

== Shimmy Disc And C/Z ==
Around this time Joe moved to Boston and attended Boston College as a literature major while simultaneously traveling back and forth to New Jersey to complete “An Emotional Buffet” and play shows, eventually dropping out of school altogether. It was during this time that Keith started learn to play guitar and write his own songs as well as collaborating on songs with Pat. With Joe's songs dominating “An Emotional Buffet” and the song writing collaborations between the two lessening, perhaps Keith's survival instincts kicked in.

In early 1994 local label “Inkling Records” released a vinyl EP of new Semibeings work, which Keith promptly sent to legendary eccentric indie producer Kramer who immediately booked the band for sessions at his Noise New Jersey studio. The ensuing album Sickness and Health produced by Kramer was released on Shimmy Disc in early 1995. At one point Kramer was quoted on the Shimmy Disc website as stating that he considered “Sickness and Health” among the five best Shimmy Disc releases of all time. KnitMedia eventually purchased “Sickness and Health” along with much of the rest of Shimmy Disc's back catalogue.

Option Magazine reviewed the album stating “This New Jersey quintet makes a Kramer-produced psychedelic sound that's got one foot in the grave, one foot at a rave, and the middle leg pissing on the alterna-rock scene” (Option 1995).

During this time, the band played a Shimmy Disc showcase at New York's Knitting Factory alongside Kramer and Low. Neil Strauss, covering the show for The New York Times, reported “The Semi-Beings were two bands in one. The songs that the singer Joe Baker yowled were hazy, psychedelic rockers imbued with a touch of blues and a dash of dissonance; the numbers sung by the gentler-voiced Keith Monacchio droned instead of rocked and were usually supported by the chiming and ringing of three acoustic guitars”. (New York Times, 1995).

The band at this point started describing their music as “acoustic folk punk” and both their live sets and recordings included playing acoustic guitars through large Marshall amplifiers at high volumes which created a ringing feedback wall of sound.

Kramer and the band completed the follow-up Three Pawns Standing in 1996, with the album being picked up and the band being signed to the legendary Seattle label C/Z which by this point was owned by former Skin Yard member Daniel House. C/Z also released their song Disco Of Bums on the final Teriyaki Asthma compilation.

The band played various Shimmy Disc showcases with Hugh Hopper and King Missile as well as making the rounds of east coast clubs like New York's Brownies or The Stone Pony in Asbury Park, N.J, playing shows with Amandla, Chris Harford and regularly with Laura Dawn and her first band Fluffer as well as Shimmy Disc label mates Tin Ear. The band also played the West Beth Theatre in New York as a part of C/Z's showcase in the 1997 CMJ music festival along with Gerald Collier and Moonshake.

The band also went on a cross-country tour in the summer of 1997, but mainly played in Seattle while crashing at Daniel House's house. They played a show with Damon and Naomi at Seattle's Showbox.

Throughout all this the band lost and then regained Tom McDonald as bassist (Dana Wasserman was bassist in the interim although never recording with the band) as well as losing Dave Von Bargen and cycling through too many drummers to count. Eventually Pat would play drums on their recordings.

== Endings ==
The four-piece Semibeings of Joe, Pat, Keith and Tom went on to record The Semibeings Are Bums in 1998 at SS Sound Studios. The album was originally to be put out by C/Z but the label essentially dropped the band due to its own financial hardships. (C/Z folded shortly after, with Daniel House eventually releasing tracks from "Bums" on his online label Weedfiles). Also, since 1994 they had worked on a concept album based around a "nervous breakdown" called Tales From the Microvoid. During the 1999 sessions, the fighting between the band members particularly between Keith and Joe escalated to the point where Keith left the band altogether. More and more it became evident that the two primary songwriters were writing very different material with the “two bands in one” getting to the point of being incompatible. The three remaining Semibeings finished off “Tales from the Microvoid” and disbanded.

The band in fact did split up into two very different bands with brothers Joe and Pat forming the short lived Junkygood and Keith and Tom forming The Commons. Junkygood made some recordings, most notably with Andrew Weiss from Rollins Band and Ween fame. Keith and Tom's Common's self-released a number of albums and in 2007 announced that they were disbanding. As of 2010, Joe and Pat have formed a new band titled Bake, self-releasing their debut EP "Summer Joy".

In reference to The Semibeings work, RollingStone.com stated “Their intricate, dreamy songs have a propulsive and hard-edged quality that at times sounds like a non-distorted Screaming Trees or a more varied, faster Codeine. Some of the songwriting is shockingly gorgeous”.

== Discography ==
- 1992 - The Semibeings - Self-released
- 1992 - An Emotional Buffet - Self-released
- 1994 - The Semibeings 7" - Inkling Records - (3 song EP - "I'm A Man", "In" and "I Am")
- 1995 - Sickness and Health - Shimmy Disc 078
- 1997 - Three Pawns Standing - C/Z Records
- 1998 - The Semibeings Are Bums - Unreleased
- 1994-1999 - Tales From The Microvoid - Unreleased
- 1999 - Teriyaki Asthma, Vols. 6-10-Various Artists - C/Z Records (Compilation featuring the song "Disco of Bums" from the unreleased Semibeings album "Tales from the Microvoid")
