= Wisconsin Hayride =

EP by Gumball
- Released: 1992
- Recorded: 1992
- Genre: Alternative rock, indie rock
- Length: 14:02
- Label: Columbia
- Producer: Butch Vig, Steve Marker

Gumball chronology
| Special Kiss (1991) | Wisconsin Hayride (1992) | Super Tasty (1993) |

Professional ratings
Review scores
| Source | Rating |
|---|---|
| Allmusic | 3.5/5 stars |

Wisconsin Hayride was the first major label release by Gumball. The EP, Recorded and Released in 1992, was a teaser set to capitalize on the Alternative rock boom of the time before they could spend time recording a proper full length. Wisconsin Hayride is an all covers EP featuring songs by Mahavishnu Orchestra, Black Flag, Foetus, Small Faces and The Damned.

== Track listing ==
1. "New Rose" - (Brian James)
2. "Tell Me Have You Ever Seen Me" - (Ronnie Lane, Steve Marriott)
3. "Butterfly Potion" - (JG Thirwell)
4. "Depression" - (Greg Ginn)
5. "Awakening" - (John McLaughlin)

== Personnel ==
- Don Fleming - lead vocals, guitar
- Jay Spiegel - drums, lead vocals on "Tell Me Have You Ever Seen Me"
- Eric Vermillion - bass, lead vocals on "Depression"
- J Mascis - guitar on "New Rose" and "Depression"
- Butch Vig - producer, engineer, mixing
- Steve Marker - producer, engineer, mixing
- Greg Calbi - mastering
