= Jellyfish Kiss =

Music band

Jellyfish Kiss were an alternative rock band from Leeds, England.

The band was formed in late 85/early 86 by guitarist Mark and drummer Mark Drew, who recruited other members, Geoff Bell (lead gtr), Barry (bass) and Cosmo Nasty (vox). After some progress on the regional gigging circuit, dissatisfaction within the band forced some personnel changes, Geoff and Barry being replaced by Dave and Nik. They released a début album, Gasoline Junkie in 1989 on the Long Pig label, distributed by What Goes On records. They then signed to Demon Records who issued second album Plank in 1990. They then moved to Kramer's Shimmy Disc label for two further albums, Animal Rites (1990) and Strange Weather (1991), with several line-up changes taking place (the Animal Rites line-up included Greg Seeger on drums and Mick Flanagan on keyboards). Later, John Galvin replaced Nik on bass. Animal Rites was described as "mind-numbing" by Factsheet Five, who described it: "Imagine what would have happened if someone had handed Ravi Shankar an electric guitar instead of a sitar." The band recorded a session for John Peel's BBC Radio 1 show in February 1990. The Animal Rites line-up also recorded a track for a compilation album, Knowing Where It All Leeds, with Jess on vocals, as well as a track for the ShimmyDisc Rutles tribute album with a guest secret collaborator from another contemporary Leeds band, and Jonny on vocals. Their Velvets cover I'm Sticking With You, was released on one of the Heaven and Hell Velvet Underground tribute albums. In November 1991 they received a setback when they were attacked on tour and had £5,000 worth of equipment stolen. After an EP in 1992 the band split up.

Singer David Tomlinson went on to form CNN/XC-NN, and later Tin Star, with former All About Eve and Sisters of Mercy guitarist Tim Bricheno.

== Discography ==
=== Albums ===
- Gasoline Junkie (1989), Longpig
- Plank (1990), Demon
- Animal Rites (1990), Shimmy Disc
- Stormy Weather or Strange Weather (1991), Shimmy Disc

=== EPs ===
- Big Driving (1992), Longpig

=== Compilation appearances ===
- Rutles Highway Revisited (A Tribute To The Rutles) (1990), Shimmy Disc: "Get Up And Go"
- Knowing Where It All Leeds (1991), Stolen Sounds: "LA"
- Heaven & Hell – Volume Three (A Tribute To The Velvet Underground) (1992), Imaginary: "I'm Sticking With You"
