= Swish (band) =

Swish is an American indie rock band founded by Lori Martin Gregory in the fall of 1995 in Boston, Massachusetts, and includes guitarist Joe Boyle and Dinosaur Jr. drummer Patrick "Murph" Murphy. Lori founded the project after playing in the Boston music scene for years, including a brief European tour as a fill-in bassist for Helium, between Brian Dunton and Ash Bowie of Polvo.

In the summer of 1996, Don Fleming produced a 7-song Swish EP, "Supermax," which was released on his Instant Mayhem label and distributed by Caroline/Virgin Records in seven countries. The EP features a track, "Game," which was recorded and engineered by Wally Gagel and includes a cello track by Duke Roth, formerly of Bullet Lavolta.

"Supermax" was well received among indie rock critics. M. Tye Comer of the CMJ New Music Report described the disc as "emotionally dense tracks (that) trudge along like angels walking barefoot on cobblestone," (Review, "CMJ New Music Report," M. Tye Comer, June 3, 1996) and John Elsasser of Magnet Magazine declared that "Martin has the kind of voice you could listen to for hours," (Review, "Magnet Magazine," John Elsasser, Aug./Sept. 1996). Following the disc's release Swish toured briefly with Mike Watt (at the time featuring guitarist Nels Cline, now of Wilco), playing shows in Boston, Western Massachusetts and New York.

In 1997, Murph also signed on to drum for Evan Dando and The Lemonheads, for which he brought Lori along who was offered the bassist position by Dando. However, she declined to join.

After several years playing around in the acting and music world in Los Angeles, Lori is actively writing again and is working with original members Murph and Joe, as well as long-time friend and engineer/producer James Buckley.

Swish released three digital singles online via Bandcamp in 2014: Fear, Crickets and Lindstroms and Radar. They are the first three singles off of their in-process album "False Maria."

== Discography ==
=== EP's ===
Title	Year	Label
Supermax	1996	Instant Mayhem Records
