= Take Stuff from Work =

Single by King Missile

from the album Fluting on the Hump
- Released: 1987
- Recorded: 1987
- Genre: Avant-garde
- Length: 2:12
- Label: Shimmy Disc
- Songwriter(s): John S. Hall, King Missile
- Producer(s): Kramer

King Missile singles chronology
"Take Stuff from Work" (1987)	"The Box" (1988)

"Take Stuff from Work" is a song by avant-garde band King Missile. It appears on the band's 1987 debut album Fluting on the Hump.

== Content ==
In "Take Stuff from Work," a jangly acoustic guitar and simple drumbeat are punctuated by occasional saxophone fills as frontman John S. Hall delivers a monologue in which he advises listeners to steal various office supplies from their places of employment. Hall states that such theft is "the best way to feel better about your job," and concludes, "I wrote this at work. They're paying me to write about stuff I steal from them. Life is good."

In the liner notes of the compilation Mystical Shit & Fluting on the Hump, Hall writes of "Take Stuff from Work": "I did, in fact, write this at work... I went to my desk [and] just looked around the room to think of things to take. The whole thing was completely unoriginal."

== Music video ==
The video for "Take Stuff from Work" was directed for no fee by J.F.K. Nitzberg.
