= Angherr Shisspa =

Studio album by Koenjihyakkei
- Released: 2005
- Recorded: Spring 2005
- Genres: Zeuhl, progressive rock
- Length: 50:10
- Label: Skin Graft Records

Koenjihyakkei chronology
Nivraym (2001)	Angherr Shisspa (2005)	Dhorimviskha (2018)

Professional ratings
Review scores
Source	Rating
Pitchfork Media	(8.3/10)

Angherr Shisspa is the fourth studio album by the Zeuhl band Koenjihyakkei.

== Track listing ==
All tracks by Yoshida Tatsuya except where noted

1. "Tziidall Raszhisst" – 7:14
2. "Rattims Friezz" (Sakamoto, Yoshida) – 7:01
3. "Grahbem Jorgazz" (Kanazawa, Yoshida) – 4:06
4. "Fettim Paillu" – 7:45
5. "Quivem Vrastorr" – 4:22
6. "Mibingvahre" (Sakamoto) – 4:07
7. "Angherr Shisspa" – 6:34
8. "Wammilica Iffirom" – 8:39

== Personnel ==
- Yoshida Tatsuya – drums, vocals
- Sakamoto Kengo – bass, vocals
- Kanazawa Miyako – keyboards, vocals
- Yamamoto Kyoko – vocals
- Komori Keiko – reeds, vocals
