= Stonehenge (Ruins album) =

Studio album by Ruins
- Released: 1990
- Recorded: Afterbeat, Tokyo, Japan
- Genre: Experimental rock; progressive rock
- Length: 68:32
- Label: Shimmy Disc
- Producer: Ruins

Ruins chronology
Ruins III (1988)	Stonehenge (1990)	Early Works: Live & Unreleased Tracks (1991)

Professional ratings
Review scores
Source	Rating
AllMusic	4.5/5 stars

Stonehenge is the second album by Ruins, released in 1990 through Shimmy Disc.

== Track listing ==
All tracks are written by Tatsuya Yoshida.

No.	Title	Length
1.	"Big Head"	4:58
2.	"Iron Lady"	2:18
3.	"Cathechism"	2:43
4.	"Kibbutz"	3:26
5.	"Fallout"	2:19
6.	"Plexus"	1:00
7.	"October"	3:51
8.	"Hexagon"	2:44
9.	"Anaclasis"	2:07
10.	"Holebones"	2:25
11.	"Hail"	2:40
12.	"Stonehenge"	3:51
13.	"Thebes"	6:09
14.	"Flagment"	1:10
15.	"B.U.G."	6:36
16.	"Ripples"	2:40
17.	"Masacari"	1:59
18.	"Devided"	2:13
19.	"Octopus"	3:17
20.	"Dadaism"	4:06
21.	"Infect"	5:51

== Personnel ==
Ruins

- Kazuyoshi Kimoto – vocals, bass guitar, violin
- Tatsuya Yoshida – vocals, drums, photography, design

Production and additional personnel

- Ruins – production
- Michael Dorf – assistant producer
