= Special Kiss =

Studio album by Gumball
- Released: 1991
- Recorded: 1990
- Genre: Alternative rock
- Length: 35:51
- Label: Primo Scree
- Producer: Don Fleming

Gumball chronology
Special Kiss (1991)	Wisconsin Hayride (1992)

Special Kiss is the first album by Gumball. It was released in 1991 on the Primo Scree label. It contains contributions from Thurston Moore and Teenage Fanclub.

== Critical reception ==
Professional ratings
Review scores
Source	Rating
AllMusic	3/5 stars
Robert Christgau	(neither)

Trouser Press called the album "a locomotive blur of abrasive pop and gnarly guitar psychosis." Spin wrote that "some tracks rock out a la Black Sabbath, some slam your head against the wall courtesy of blazing hardcore, and some make your stomach sick with wimpy pop."

== Track listing ==
1. "This Town" - (Fleming)
2. "All the Time" - (Fleming)
3. "Window Pain" - (Fleming)
4. "Wake Up" - (Gumball)
5. "Summer Days" - (Fleming)
6. "Yellow Pants" - (Fleming)
7. "Restless" - (Fleming)
8. "Gone Too Far" - (Gumball)
9. "Gettysburg" - (Gumball)
10. "Alternate Feed" - (Fleming)
11. "You Know" - (Teenage Fanclub and Gumball)
12. "Pre" - (Gumball)
13. "High or Low"
14. "Gettysburg (Twister Mix)" - (Gumball)

== Personnel ==
- Don Fleming - vocals, guitar, producer
- Jay Spiegel - drums, vocals ("Gone Too Far")
- Eric Vermillion - bass, vocals ("Wake Up", "You Know")
- Raymond McGinley - guitar, background vocals ("You Know")
- Brendan O'Hare - background vocals ("You Know")
- Norman Blake - background vocals ("You Know")
- Gerard Love - background vocals ("You Know")
- Paul Crisholm - bass ("You Know")
- Thurston Moore - keyboards ("Gettysburg")

Technical

- Jim Waters - engineer
- James Kavoussi - engineer
- Wharton Tiers - engineer
