= Hundred Sights of Koenji =

高円寺百景

Studio album by Koenjihyakkei
- Released: 1994
- Recorded: April–May 1994
- Genres: Zeuhl, progressive rock
- Length: 45:36
- Label: God Mountain
- Producer: Hoppy Kamiyama

Koenjihyakkei chronology
高円寺百景 (1994)	弐(II) (1997)

Professional ratings
Review scores
Source	Rating
Allmusic	4.5/5 stars

高円寺百景, also known as Hundred Sights of Koenji, is the 1994 debut album by the Zeuhl band Koenjihyakkei. The album was released in the USA in 2008 by the American record label Skin Graft Records in a new version where drummer and founding member Tatsuya Yoshida has re-recorded the drums and remixed the entire album.

== Track listing ==
No.	Title	Writer(s)	Length
1.	"Ioss"	Yoshida	3:54
2.	"Doi Doi"	Yoshida	6:37
3.	"Molavena"	Lyrics: Yoshida, Music: Kubota	4:32
4.	"Gepek"	Kuwahara	4:06
5.	"Yagonahh"	Traditional	3:46
6.	"Ozone Fall"	Yoshida	4:19
7.	"Zhess"	Yoshida	2:10
8.	"Zoltan"	Kubota	4:17
9.	"Avedumma"	Yoshida	7:06
10.	"Sunna Zarioki"	Yoshida	4:49

== Personnel ==
- Yoshida Tatsuya – drums, vocals
- Kuwahara Shigekazu – bass, vocals
- Kubota Aki – vocals, keyboards
- Masuda Ryuichi – guitars, vocals
