= 8-track cartridge =

Magnetic tape sound recording format

Stereo 8
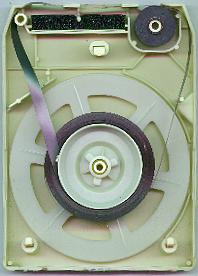
- The inside of a cartridge. The black rubber pinch roller is at upper right.
- Media type: Magnetic tape cartridge
- Encoding: Stereo analog signal
- Capacity: Four stereo channels
- Read mechanism: Tape head
- Write mechanism: Magnetic recording head
- Developed by: Lear Industries
- Usage: Audio storage
- Extended from: Fidelipac/Mohawk cartridge
- Released: 1965; 61 years ago

The 8-track tape (formally Stereo 8; commonly called eight-track cartridge, eight-track tape, and eight-track) is a magnetic-tape sound-recording technology that was popular from the mid-1960s until the early 1980s, when the compact cassette, which antedated the 8-track system, surpassed it in popularity for recorded music.

The format was commonly used in cars and was most popular in the United States and Canada, and to a lesser extent, in the United Kingdom, Ireland, and Japan. One advantage of the 8-track tape cartridge was that it could play continuously in an endless loop, and did not have to be ejected, turned around, and reinserted to play the entire tape. After about 80 minutes of playing time, the tape would start again at the beginning. Because of the loop, no rewind is possible; the only options the user has are: play, fast forward, record, and program (track) change.

The Stereo 8 Cartridge was created in 1965 by a consortium led by Bill Lear of Lear Jet Corporation, along with Ampex, Ford Motor Company, General Motors, Motorola, and RCA Victor Records (RCA—Radio Corporation of America).

While the 8-track format is now considered obsolete, some collectors refurbish cartridges and players, and some artists have continued to release music on 8-track, largely for the novelty factor. Cheap Trick's 2009 album The Latest was issued on 8-track, as was Dolly Parton's 2020 Christmas album A Holly Dolly Christmas, the latter including an exclusive bonus track.

== Technology ==
The cartridge's dimensions are roughly 5.25 by 4.0 by 0.8 inches (13.3 cm × 10.2 cm × 2.0 cm). The magnetic tape is played at 3.75 inches per second (twice the speed of a cassette), is wound around a single spool, is about 0.25 inches (0.64 cm) wide and contains eight parallel tracks. The player's head reads two of these tracks at a time, for stereo sound. After completing a program, the head mechanically switches to another set of two tracks, creating a characteristic clicking noise.

== History ==
=== Development ===
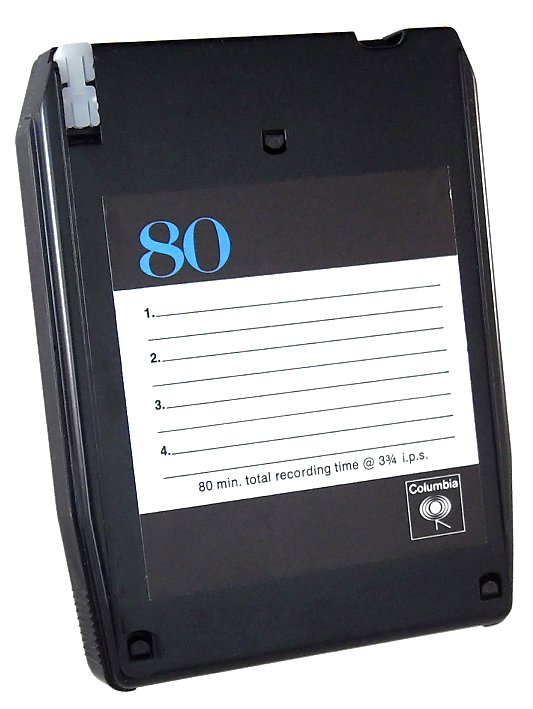
A blank compatible Stereo-Quadraphonic 8-track cartridge

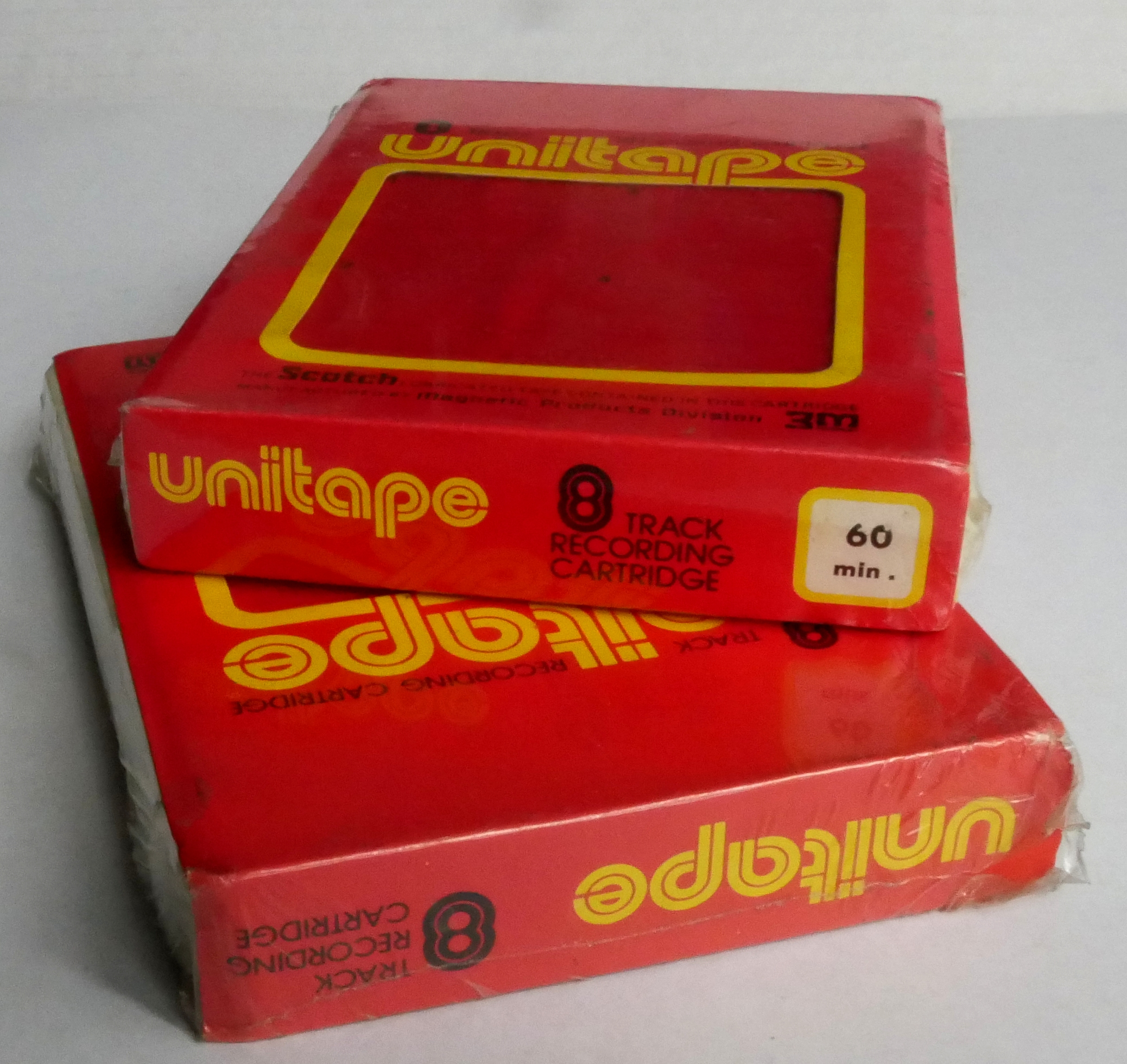
Blank cartridges could be used to make recordings at home.

Inventor George Eash came up with a design in 1953, called the Fidelipac cartridge, or the NAB cartridge, which would later be used not only in the Muntz Stereo-Pak but also in various monaural background music systems from the late 1960s to the early 1990s.

His inspiration came from one of the first products that used the endless tape cartridge technology—the Audio Vendor, invented a year earlier by Bernard Cousino. The tape passed through an inner ring of loose tape reel, where the recording is stored, and looped back through the outer ring of the reel. Initially, this mechanism was intended to be implemented in a reel-to-reel audio tape recorder.

Later, Cousino developed a plastic case that could be mounted on some existing tape recorders. This cartridge was marketed by John Herbert Orr as the Orrtronic Tapette. In this generation, the tape was wound with the magnetic coating facing the inside of the reel. Later cartridge types had the magnetic layer facing the outside of the reel, so it had to be played by a specially designed recorder. Once traction of the tape by capstan was added, users had the convenience of just pushing the cartridge into the recorder without having to thread the tape. These cassettes required no internal space for the tape head slider because they accessed the tape from outside the cartridge.

Based on these new cassettes, George Eash developed the Fidelipac cartridge in 1954. PlayTape and the endless-loop compact cassettes for the announcement text of answering machines were made with this technique along with other similar but incompatible answering machine tapes. The original separate take-up reel got a platter laid under the supply reel to combine the two and the perforation around the edge of the reel for traction was removed. No rear winding reel was inside such a cassette, so rewinding was impossible. Previously, a similar technique was used to store Tefifon grooved-vinyl sonic tape in the Tefi cartridge, but without the benefit of a reel due to the width being 16 mm, over twice that of an 8-track and due to the thickness of the film at 3 mils (75 μm).

Another similar technology was the LaBelle Tutor 16, which combined several endless-loop technologies at once. A 35 mm filmstrip was reduced to 16 mm and loaded into an endless-loop film cartridge similar to a Fisher Price Movie Viewer, which used silent truncated versions of 16 mm cartoons. The bottom of this cartridge acted as the top for the sound cartridge below it, which was basically identical to an 8-track. The only difference was the recording used the same two-track format as mono NAB carts at the same 3-3/4 IPS speed (9.5 cm/s) as an 8-track with the program material on one track and the subsonic picture-change automation tone on the other track.

Films, both silent and sound, in 8 mm and 16 mm configurations, and in optical or magnetic sound formats, were also produced as endless loops. They were used in applications from store end-cap sales tools to on-the-road engineering instructions to early portable airline movies. Instead of having any part of the mechanism located inside the cartridge, the only part located there was a 45° mirror to reflect the light through the film and onto either the internal frosted screen or an external screen by way of flipping another mirror in to redirect the picture.

=== Stereo 8 ===
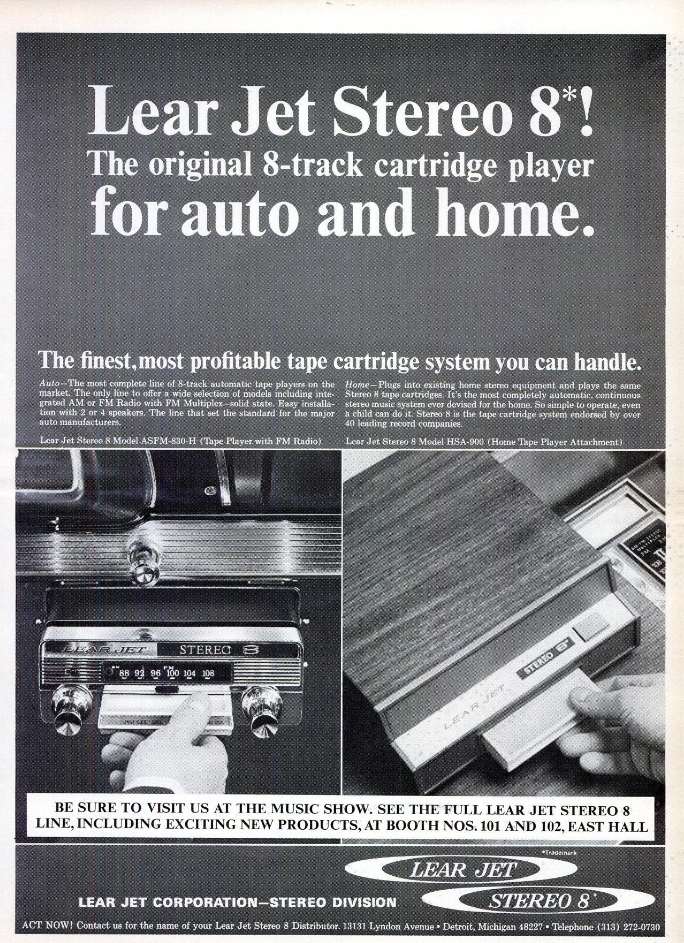
Lear Jet Stereo 8 advertisement, Billboard July 16, 1966

The Lear Jet Stereo 8 cartridge was designed by Richard Kraus while working for the Lear Jet Corporation, under Bill Lear, in 1963. The major change was to incorporate a neoprene rubber and nylon pinch roller into the cartridge itself, rather than to make the pinch roller a part of the tape player, reducing mechanical complexity. Lear also eliminated some of the internal parts of the Eash cartridge, such as the tape-tensioning mechanism and an interlock that prevented tape slippage. Because the Stereo-Pak cartridges were prone to jamming due to their complex design, Lear endeavored to redesign them, putting twice the number of tracks on them, doubling their recording time first to 80 minutes and then extending that to 100 minutes.

=== Discrete Quadraphonic 8-track ===
Four-channel 8-tracks were distinguishable by the notch in the upper left hand corner as in the picture to the right. Blanks such as this one were sold with a white spacer occupying the notch the same as 45 rpm adapter were sold to convert 7-inch (19 cm) large-hole singles so that they could be played on conventional turntables. This notch activated the second set of tracks on the new head, which would have originally played programs 3 and 4 of a stereo tape and used them simultaneously with heads that would read programs 1 and 2.

Tapes were first marketed for the fall 1970 music season. Oddly, the last Stereo-Pak four track Muntz cartridge tapes (vs four channel quadraphonic) were still being produced at the same time, as were regular Stereo 8 tapes.

=== Time limitations ===
Going back to using the same amount of tape for an album as a Stereo-Pak was a little annoying to consumers because "Two Albums on One Tape for the Same Low Price (as an LP)" was now impossible. Quadraphonic issues of double albums on 8-track had to occupy two or even (in the case of classical music) three tapes.

If an album ran over 50 minutes, half the time that could be recorded on a Stereo 8-track, and not enough program material remained to justify a second tape, producers would edit or eliminate some songs to make the album fit the 25-minute-per-program time limit. Commercial recordings were going back to a slightly smaller version of the same truncated program problems that plagued 2-track stereo tapes 20 years earlier. Quadraphonic cassettes were experimented with starting in 1974, but never gained a toehold until cassette portastudios established themselves 10 years later just before digital took off.

=== Commercial success ===
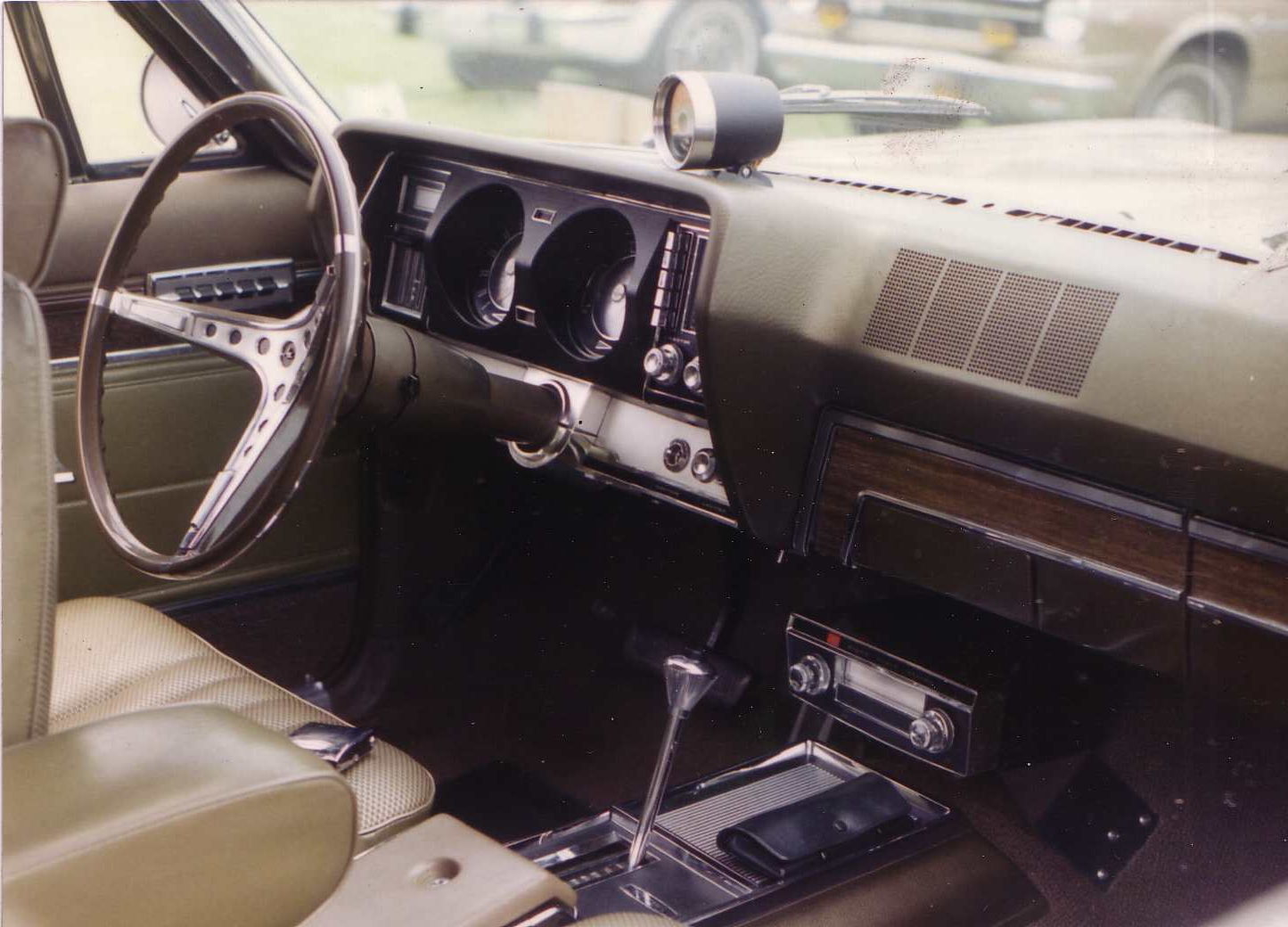
Factory-optional 8-track stereo player in a 1967 American Motors Marlin mounted between the center console and dash

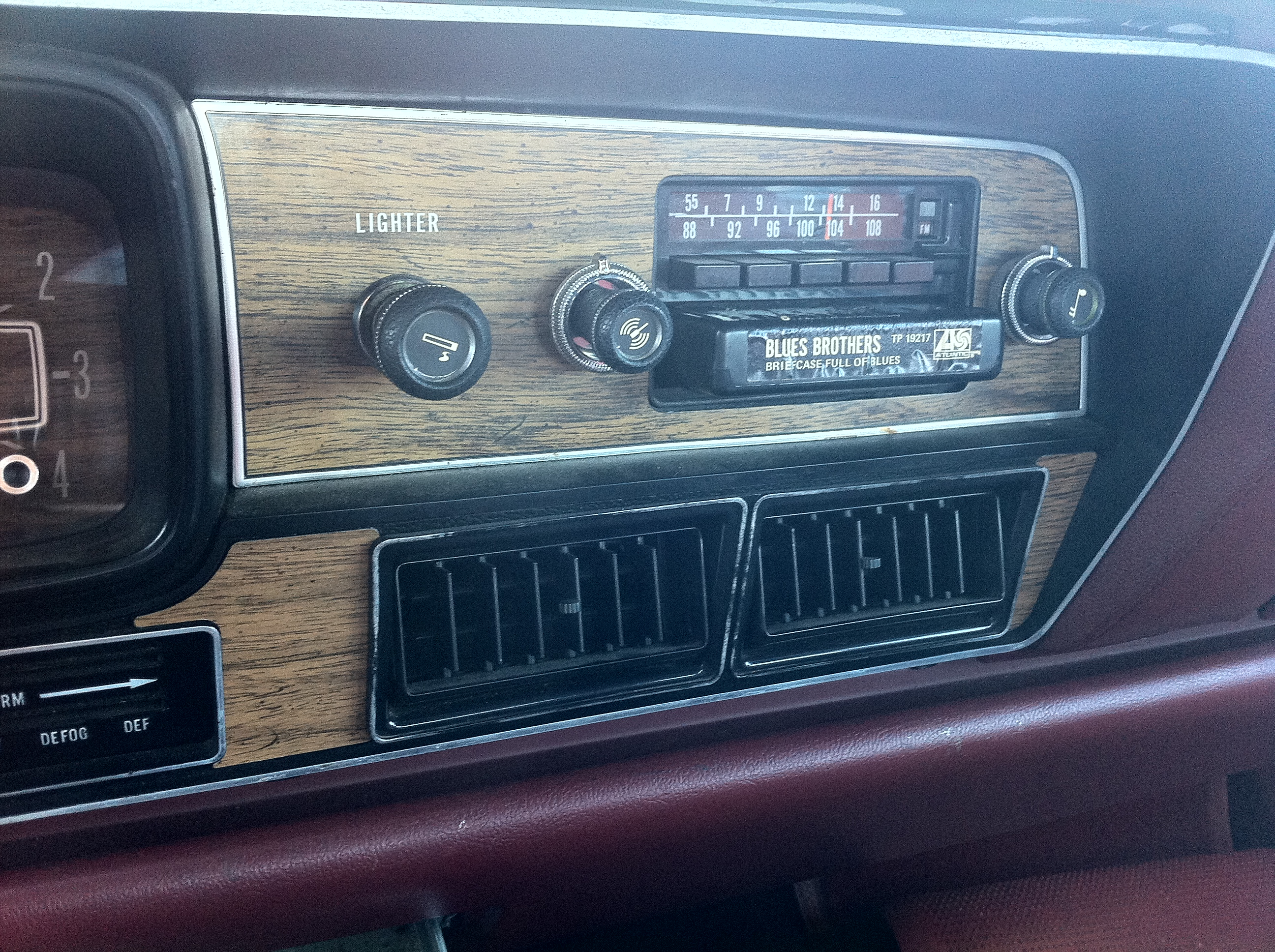
Factory-installed AM/FM radio/8-track unit in a 1978 AMC Matador with a Briefcase Full of Blues cartridge in "play" position

The popularity of both four-track and eight-track cartridges grew from the booming automobile industry. In September 1965, the Ford Motor Company introduced factory-installed and dealer-installed eight-track tape players as an option on three of its 1966 models (the sporty Mustang, luxurious Thunderbird, and high-end Lincoln), and RCA Victor introduced 175 Stereo-8 Cartridges from its RCA Victor and RCA Camden labels of recording artists catalogs. By the 1967 model year, all of Ford's vehicles offered this tape player upgrade option. Most of the initial factory installations were separate players from the radio (such as shown in the image), but dashboard mounted 8-track units were offered in combination with an AM radio, as well as with AM/FM receivers.

The 8-track format gained steadily in popularity because of its convenience and portability. Home players were introduced in 1966, allowing consumers to share tapes between their homes and portable systems. By the late 1960s, the 8-track segment was the largest in the US consumer electronics market (Low UK and European sales as Compact Cassette was released 1962) and the popularity of 8-track systems for cars helped generate demand for home units. "Boombox" type portable players were also popular, but eight-track player/recorders failed to gain wide popularity and few manufacturers offered them except for manufacturer Tandy Corporation (for its Radio Shack electronics stores). With the availability of cartridge systems for the home, consumers started thinking of eight-tracks as a viable alternative to 33 rpm album-style vinyl records, not only as a convenience for the car. Also by the late 1960s, prerecorded releases on the 8-track tape format began to arrive within a month of the vinyl release. The 8-track format became by far the most popular and offered the largest music library of all the tape systems in the US.

=== Early karaoke machines ===
Daisuke Inoue invented the first karaoke machine in 1971 called the Juke-8.

=== Other uses ===
In 1968, Sega released an arcade electromechanical game MotoPolo, which used an 8-track player to play back the sounds of the motorbikes.

Milton Bradley's OMNI Entertainment System was an electronic quiz machine game first released in 1980, similar to Jeopardy! or later entries in the You Don't Know Jack video game series, using 8-track tapes for questions, instructions, and answers, using audio playback as well as digital signals in magnetic-tape data storage on remaining tracks to load the right answer for counting the score. In 1978, the Mego Corporation launched the 2-XL toy robot, which utilized the tracks for determining right from wrong answers. In 1977, the Scottish company GR International released the Bandmaster Powerhouse, a drum machine that played back custom-made 8-track cartridges similar to a Mellotron or Chamberlin Music Master containing drum and percussion rhythm loops recorded with real instruments. These could be subjected to a degree of processing using the drum machine's controls, which included tempo and instrument balance.

=== Decline ===
Sales of 8-track tapes peaked in the United States in 1978 and then began to suffer a swift decline. Sales of the compact cassette began to gain momentum, while 8-track players became less common in new cars and in homes. By 1980, the 8-track was already being phased out in favor of cassettes, largely due to the success of the Sony Walkman. Sales for cassette tapes eventually caught up and dethroned LPs by 1983.

In the United States, 8-track cartridges had been phased out of most retail stores by 1983; until late 1988, some titles were still available on 8-tracks through the Columbia House and RCA Music Service record clubs. Radio Shack (Tandy Corporation) continued to sell blank eight-track cartridges and players under its Realistic brand until 1990.

== Later years ==
In 1995, 8-Track Heaven co-founder Russ Forster released the film So Wrong They're Right which was a documentary about 8-tracks.

== See also ==
- PlayTape
- HiPac
- Stereo-Pak
- Album era
- Timeline of audio formats
- Sound recording and reproduction
- Birotron
