= Super Tasty =

Studio album by Gumball
- Released: 1993
- Recorded: 1993
- Genres: Alternative rock, grunge, indie rock
- Length: 39:55
- Label: Columbia
- Producer: Butch Vig

Gumball chronology
Wisconsin Hayride (1992)	Super Tasty (1993)	Revolution on Ice (1994)

Super Tasty is the second album by Gumball. It was released in 1993 via Columbia, the band's first album for a major label.

Three singles, "Accelerator," "The Damage Done" and "Real Gone Deal," received airplay on alternative radio and 120 Minutes. Dinosaur Jr's J Mascis plays on two tracks.

== Production ==
The album was partly recorded in a barn close to Vig's Smart Studios.

== Critical reception ==
Professional ratings
Review scores
Source	Rating
AllMusic	4/5 stars

Trouser Press wrote: "A bit more bite would not have gone amiss; much of Fleming’s lyric irony sounds more weary than wired. Still, Super Tasty is a buzzin’ good time, if only for its wonderfully retro sonic glitz." The Chicago Tribune called the album "overproduced," writing that the songs sounded better in concert. New York Magazine called it "full of rollicking, loose-limbed road songs." The New York Times wrote: " In songs that are well-made but never break free of their genres, the band seems content to be a throwback, while a listener is left waiting for the twist." Spin wrote that Super Tasty "has a nice, loose, rockin' vibe."

== Track listing ==
All songs by Don Fleming unless otherwise noted

1. "Accelerator"
2. "Hell of a Message"
3. "Here It Comes Again"
4. "Tumbling"
5. "Marilyn"
6. "The Damage Done"
7. "Real Gone Deal"
8. "Thunder"
9. "Black Payback" - (Gumball)
10. "No More"
11. "Got the Cure" - (Vermillion)
12. "Upsetters Theme Song"

== Personnel ==
- Don Fleming – vocals, guitar
- Jay Spiegel – drums
- Eric Vermillion – bass, vocals on "Got the Cure"
- J Mascis – guitar on "Here It Comes Again" and "Upsetters Theme Song"
- Butch Vig – producer, engineer, mixing
- Greg Calbi – mastering
