= Burning Stone =

Studio album by Ruins
- Released: 1992
- Recorded: Autumn 1991 at GOK Sound Studio, Tokyo, Japan
- Genres: Experimental rock, progressive rock
- Length: 51:07
- Label: Shimmy Disc
- Producer: Ruins

Ruins chronology
Early Works: Live & Unreleased Tracks (1991)	Burning Stone (1992)	Graviyaunosch (1993)

Professional ratings
Review scores
Source	Rating
Allmusic	4.5/5 stars

Burning Stone is the third album by Ruins, released in 1992 through Shimmy Disc.

== Track listing ==
All tracks are written by Tatsuya Yoshida.

No.	Title	Length
1.	"Zasca Coska"	6:34
2.	"Gold Stone"	2:57
3.	"Praha in Spring"	4:35
4.	"Onyx"	2:21
5.	"Sac"	0:33
6.	"Power Shift"	5:06
7.	"Shostak Ombrich"	3:12
8.	"Vexoprakta"	3:26
9.	"Real Jam"	4:40
10.	"Misonta"	3:15
11.	"Burning Stone"	0:53
12.	"Spazm Cambilist"	2:11
13.	"Negotiation"	3:40
14.	"Grubandgo"	3:48
15.	"Dapp"	3:28

== Personnel ==
Ruins

- Ryuichi Masuda – bass guitar
- Tatsuya Yoshida – vocals, drums, percussion, photography, art direction

Production and additional personnel

- Michael Dorf – assistant producer
- Naomi Kawakami – photography
