= Kōenji Hyakkei =

Japanese band

Kōenji Hyakkei 高円寺百景
- Origin: Tokyo, Japan
- Genres: Zeuhl, progressive rock, experimental rock, jazz fusion
- Years active: 1991–present
- Labels: Magaibutsu (Japan); Skin Graft Records (North America)
- Members: Yoshida Tatsuya (drums, vocals); Sakamoto Kengo (bass, vocals); Yabuki Taku (keyboards); AH (vocals); Komori Keiko (reeds, vocals); Koganemaru Kei (guitar, vocals)
- Past members: Masada Ryuichi; Kuwahara Shigekazu; Harada Jin; Oguchi Kenichi; Sagara Nami; Kanazawa Miyako; Kubota Aki; Yamamoto Kyoko
- Website: Kōenji Hyakkei's Official Site (English)

Kōenji Hyakkei (高円寺百景; Japanese pronunciation: [koːeɲd͡ʑi çakkeː], "Hundred Sights of Kōenji"), also known as Kōenjihyakkei, is a Japanese Zeuhl band led by Tatsuya Yoshida (from the Japanese band Ruins), and is "his tribute to the 'Zeuhl' music" of French prog-rock band Magma.

The band released their first (self-titled) album in 1994 with Aki Kubota from Bondage Fruit on vocals and keyboard. Though rhythmically not as complex as Ruins, Kōenji Hyakkei still evokes a feeling of unfamiliarity due to non-standard modes and chanting in a nonsensical language.

== History ==
According to the official website of the band, maintained by Tatsuya Yoshida, the band was formed in 1991 with Tatsuya Yoshida (drums), Aki Kubota (vocals), Akio Izumi (guitar, ex-Aburadako), Chie Kitahara (keyboards, ex-Phaidia) and Kazuyoshi Kimoto (bass, ex-Ruins). The name Koenji Hyakkei derives from a district where the members lived in Tokyo (Koenji, Suginami-ku, Tokyo) except Kazuyoshi Kimoto. Also as the album cover art of the first album indicates, Hyakkei was borrowed from "Fugaku Hyakkei" (One Hundred Views of Mount Fuji) by novelist Osamu Dazai crossed with well-known series of Hokusai's ukiyo-e wood prints, "Fugaku Sanjurokkei" (Thirty-Six Views of Mt Fuji). The album cover is a rendition of "Totomi sanchu" from the series.

Kōenji Hyakkei's most recent album, Dhorimviskha, was released on June 27, 2018, 13 years after their previous album, Angherr Shisspa.

== Band members ==
Yoshida has been the only consistent member of the band, with Sakamoto Kengo playing bass from their second album onward. As the band has added new members, the band's sound changes, shifting from folk-influenced progressive rock to minimalism to jazz fusion with the inclusion of Komori Keiko on reeds (usually soprano saxophone) on their album Angherr Shisspa (2005).

== Language ==
The lyrics to songs by Kōenji Hyakkei are not in any real spoken language. This decision was inspired by the Kobaïan language, an artlang created by Christian Vander for his band Magma. A notable example of a song that does not use gibberish lyrics is the song "Zoltan", a Kyrie from their 1994 album Hundred Sights of Koenji). The words in Kōenji Hyakkei's lyrics are often multisyllabic, and often contain at least one digraph, if not more. Unlike Kobaïan, no diacritics are used.

== Discography ==
- 1994: Hundred Sights of Koenji (高円寺百景) (remastered and reissued in 2008)
- 1997: Viva Koenji! (弐)
- 2001: Nivraym (remastered and reissued in 2009)
- 2005: Angherr Shisspa
- 2018: Dhorimviskha

== Videography ==
- 2002: Live at Star Pine's Cafe (DVD)
- 2006: Live at Doors (DVD)
- 2008: 070531 (DVD)
- 2010: Live at Koenji High (DVD)
