= Symphonica (Ruins album) =

Studio album by Ruins
- Released: 1998
- Genre: Progressive rock
- Length: 57:19
- Label: Tzadik

Ruins chronology
| Tohjinbo* (1997) | Symphonica (1998) | Vrresto* (1998) |

Professional ratings
Review scores
| Source | Rating |
|---|---|
| Allmusic | 4/5 stars |

Symphonica is the 11th studio album by the Japanese Zeuhl band Ruins. For this album, Tatsuya Yoshida enlisted the help of a keyboard player (Kenichi Oguchi) and two female singers (Emi Eleonola and Aki Kubota) to remake several older Ruins songs. Yoshida is also joined by bassist Hisashi Sasaki.

== Track listing ==
1. "Thebes" – 7:40
2. "Graviyaunosch" – 6:21
3. "Big Head" – 7:34
4. "Praha In Spring" – 4:37
5. "Thrive" – 5:00
6. "Infect" – 10:14
7. "Brixon Varromiks" – 8:41
8. "Bliezzaning Moltz" – 7:12

== Personnel ==
- Tatsuya Yoshida: drums, vocals
- Hisashi Sasaki: bass, vocals
- Kenichi Oguchi: keyboards
- Emi Eleonola: vocals
- Aki Kubota: vocals
