= Nivraym =

Studio album by Koenjihyakkei
- Released: 2001
- Genre: Zeuhl, progressive rock
- Length: 58:22
- Label: Magaibutsu Limited

Koenjihyakkei chronology
| 弐(II) (1997) | Nivraym (2001) | Angherr Shisspa (2005) |

Professional ratings
Review scores
| Source | Rating |
|---|---|
| Allmusic | 3.5/5 stars |
| Pitchfork Media | (8.4/10) |

Nivraym is the third studio album by the Zeuhl band Koenjihyakkei, released in Japan on the Magaibutsu Limited label in 2001. The album was later released in the US in 2009 by the American record label Skin Graft Records as a re-recorded and re-mixed version.

== Track listing ==
1. Nivraym (5:39)
2. Becttem Pollt (5:17)
3. Lussesoggi Zomn (10:16)
4. Vissqaguell (5:27)
5. Mederro Passquirr (6:22)
6. Axall Hasck (6:34)
7. Maschtervoz (4:37)
8. Gassttrumm (9:20)
9. Vallczeremdoss (4:50)

Note: The title of song 4 is written as "Vissqauell" on the original version of the album, but it is written as "Vissqaguell" on the re-release and on all four of the band's live DVDs as of 2014, indicating that the latter is probably the intended spelling.

== Personnel ==
- Yoshida Tatsuya – drums, keyboards, vocals
- Sakamoto Kengo – bass, vocals
- Sagara Nami – vocals
- Harada Jin – guitars, vocals
- Kenichi Oguchi – keyboards
- Komori Keiko – saxophones
