= The Tinklers =

American rock band

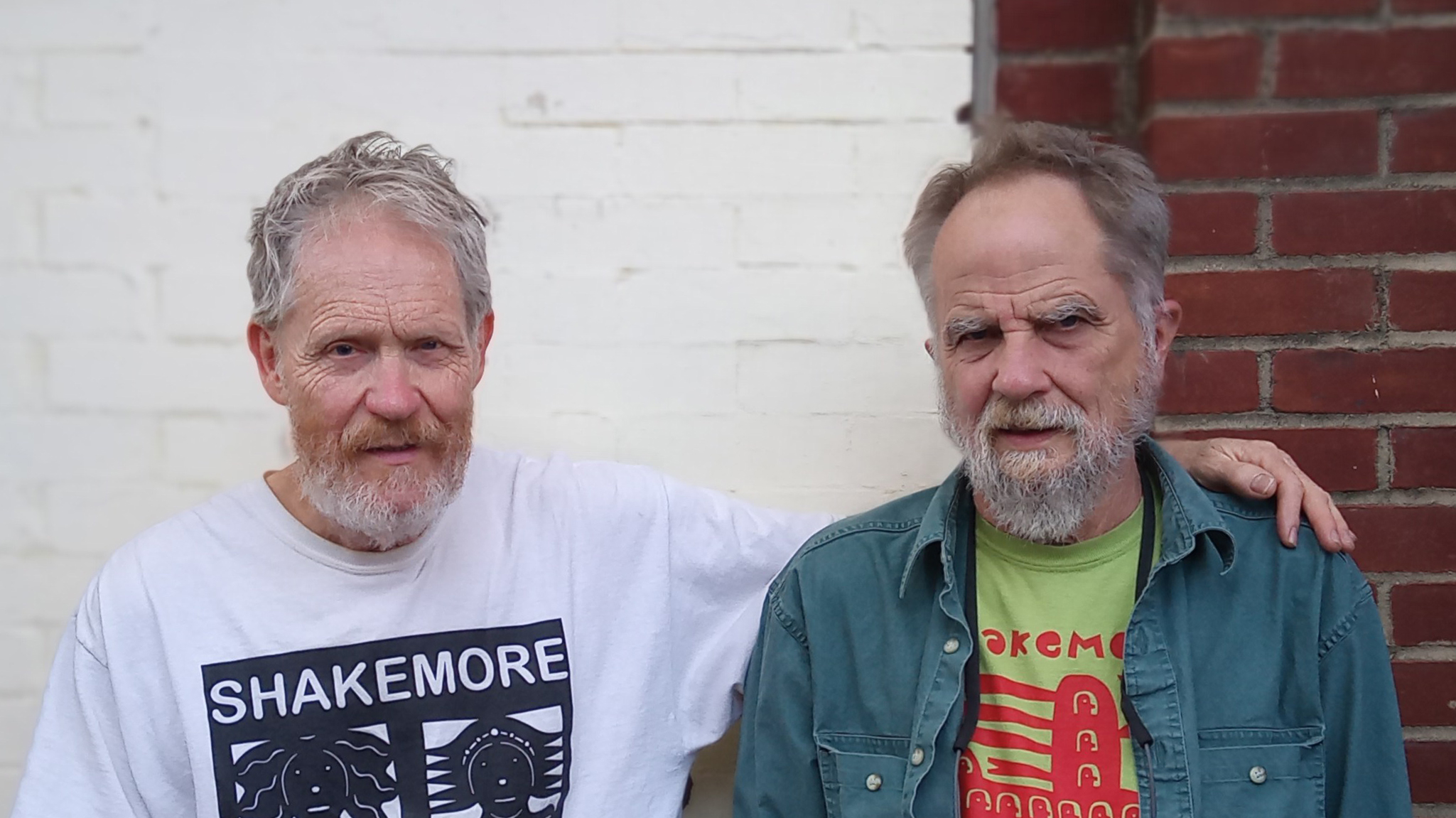
- The Tinklers in 2023

Background information
- Origin: Baltimore, Maryland
- Years active: 1979 – Present
- Label: Shimmy Disc
- Members: Charles Brohawn; Chris Mason

The Tinklers are a band from Baltimore who have been together since 1979. The group consists of Charles Brohawn and Chris Mason, both of whom sing, play guitar, and percussion instruments of varying degrees of quality (including cigar boxes, spoons, and other types of junk). Both members are also actively engaged in creating art in other mediums including visual art and books. Their music can be characterized as outsider music due to its lack of traditional musical skills and abilities including proficiency at their instruments and the ability to sing in tune. Their performance method and practice eschews conventional standards of skills thought necessary for making music and can be historically placed with other acts such as Jad Fair and Half Japanese, Daniel Johnston, and many more obscure musicians.

While the band's roots are in the mid-70s Baltimore art scene, they did not release a proper record until 1990 when the band caught the attention of legendary producer Kramer. They were promptly signed to Kramer's record label Shimmy Disc and released their first LP, Casserole. The band would release two more LPs on Shimmy Disc - Saplings and Crash - all of which contain similar material.

While The Tinklers have not disbanded, since 1993 the band has released only one full-length album, Slowpoke, and made a few other compilation appearances. Live performances are infrequent.

Outside of The Tinklers, Brohawn also released a CD with Asa Osborne of Lungfish under the name Tear Jerks on Secret Eye Records.

Throughout 2006 and 2007 the director Brian J. Averill followed the Tinklers and interviewed their friends creating the documentary Everybody Loves The Tinklers. The documentary was released November 3, 2007, at the Load of Fun space in Baltimore, Maryland.

The Tinklers released their book The Elements on Rupert Wondolowski's Shattered Wig Press on October 9, 2009. A release show was held that night at the Shattered Wig Nite hosted by Rupert Wondolowski at Baltimore's 14 Karat Cabaret.

In 2025 Zürich based Rollo Press published The Tinklers Charts and Stories ISBN 9783906213569, an anthology of the handmade books The Tinklers History of the World, The Tinklers Songs and Charts, Home by the River, and The Tinklers Encyclopedia.

== Discography ==
Albums

- 1990 Casserole (Shimmy Disc)
- 1991 Saplings (Shimmy Disc)
- 1993 Crash (Shimmy Disc)
- 1998 Slowpoke (Serious Records)

Singles, EPs & Other Appearances

- 1986 The Tinklers self-titled cassette (Widemouth Tapes)
- 1993 "James Brown", from a split 7-inch with Lungfish on Simple Machines Records
- 1993 Rutles Highway Revisited: A Tribute to The Rutles – "Blue Suede Schubert" (Shimmy Disc)
- 1994 "James Brown" compiled on Working Holiday! (Simple Machines Records) - the limited edition 2 disc version contains a live version of "Fun Fun Fun in the Sun Sun Sun"
- 1995 U.F.O.'s 7-inch (Frownland)
- 2001 "The Tinklers with XXOO ep 7-inch ( Music à la Coque)
- 2010 Seven Ways to Sunday (Thick Syrup Records) 4-disc set of Coo Coo Rockin Time songs re-imagined by The Tinklers, R. Stevie Moore, etc.
