= Tzomborgha =

Studio album by Ruins
- Released: November 11, 2002
- Recorded: 2002
- Genre: Zeuhl
- Length: 48:41
- Labels: Ipecac Recordings (CD) (IPC-035)

Ruins chronology
Pallaschtom (2000)	Tzomborgha (2002)

Professional ratings
Review scores
Source	Rating
Allmusic	4/5 stars
Pitchfork	7.9/10

Tzomborgha is the 10th full-length album by Ruins, released in 2002 by Magaibutsu Records in Japan and licensed to Ipecac Recordings for a US release. It is the final full-length album to feature Ruins as a two-piece. The Black Sabbath Medley also appears on the Temporary Residence Black Sabbath tribute album Everything Comes & Goes.

== Track listing ==
All tracks written by Ruins.

1. "Komnigriss" – 1:59
2. "Skhanddraviza" – 3:57
3. "Mennevuogth" – 4:06
4. "Messiaen" – 2:18
5. "Wanzhemvergg" – 5:00
6. "Djubatczegromm" – 2:09
7. "Zajyu" – 2:19
8. "Issighirudoh" – 3:42
9. "Muoljimbog" – 2:27
10. "Gurthemvhail" – 2:50
11. "Pachtseills" – 2:13
12. "Chittam Irangaayo" – 5:37
13. "Tzomborgha" – 5:35
14. "Black Sabbath Medley Reversible" – 2:16
15. "Mahavishnu Orchestra Medley" – 2:05
