= False Prophets (band) =

American punk rock/hardcore punk band

- Origin: New York City, U.S.
- Genres: Punk rock, hardcore punk
- Years active: 1980–1990
- Labels: Worn Out Brothers, Alternative Tentacles, Konkurrel
- Past members: Stephan Ielpi; Steve Wishnia; Peter Campbell; Matt Superty; Anthony Sepulveda

False Prophets were an American, New York City-based, punk rock/hardcore punk band which formed in 1980. The original members were Stephan Ielpi (vocals), Steve Wishnia (bass), Peter Campbell (guitar) and Matt Superty (drums).

== History ==
The False Prophets were founded in New York in June 1980. The trigger was an advertisement placed by Steven Wishnia in the weekly Village Voice, to which Stephan Ielpi and Peter Campbell replied. Ielpi's cousin Matt Superty became the first drummer. In the founding phase, the band name changed several times, so the members called themselves Glass Asylum, Severed Vains, Charred Remains and Dyslexic Prophets, before the name False Prophets established itself. The band made a name for themselves in the developing hardcore scene with regular appearances in the A7 in the East Village. In their early years, the band was also noticed by the striking appearance of their singer Ielpi, who among other things wore a kind of mustache that consisted exclusively of two braids under the nostrils, which, according to Spin magazine, looked like "two encrusted stalactites".

In 1981 and 1982 the band released two singles on the label Worn Out Records, which they founded for this purpose. Like many New York Hardcore bands, they didn't have the money to record a full album. Also in 1982 the band was represented with two titles on the sampler New York Thrash. In the same year the first drummer Superty left the band and was replaced by Patrick Blank (ex-The Undead).

Jello Biafra, an avowed fan, arranged a record deal with the Alternative Tentacles label, and their first LP False Prophets was released in 1986. Recorded in 1984, the album came out at an inopportune time - Biafra and the Dead Kennedys had been busted for "distributing harmful material to minors" since April 1986, and the investigation and subsequent trial dragged on to December, thus Biafra and Alternative Tentacles paid little attention to promotion.

In 1986 Campbell left the band. A replacement was found in the form of George Tabb and Debra Adele DeSalvo, so that the band from then on worked with two guitarists.

The second Prophets album Implosion was produced in 1987 by Giorgio Gomelsky. In the same year Wishnia and the current drummer Ned Brewster left the band after differences with Ielpi during a west coast tour.

Ielpi and DeSalvo continued the band with new members until 1993 and released an EP before the False Prophets finally separated. In 2002 the band reformed for a concert at New York's CBGB's to mark the 20th anniversary of the release of New York Thrash.

== Members ==
Guitarist DeSalvo is a full-time music journalist, has published a standard work on blues music and writes for Rolling Stone and Huffington Post. Steven Wishnia was a part-time writer for High Times and has published two novels and a non-fiction book on cannabis. In the 1990s, George Tabb released two albums and an EP on Lookout Records with the punk band Furious George, which he founded. He wrote for the fanzine Maximumrocknroll and has published three novels. Wishnia and Tabb founded the band Iron Prostrate after leaving the Prophets. Singer Ielpi now lives in San Francisco. Patrick Blanck died in a car accident in the Dominican Republic in 2001.

== Style and reception ==
The False Prophets saw themselves as a political band and were perceived as such by the media; in particular, they were said to be close to libertarianism. One of the symbols of their live performances were lengthy political speeches that were sometimes not very popular with the audience. Visually, the band set themselves apart from the NYHC cliché of shaved machos wearing jeans and t-shirts and showed themselves to be more punk. This polarized the Prophets – while on the one hand their creativity and impropriety were respected, and comparisons were made to the British crustcore band Crass, they were sometimes openly rejected by hardcore concert goers. Paul "H.R." Hudson from the Bad Brains, for example, once pelted Stephan Ielpi with a garbage can during a False Prophets live set. On the Agnostic Front camp they were stylized as "useless left hippies". Rob Kabula (Cause for Alarm) called the band "the Dead Kennedys of NYHC".

During its existence, the band went through many line-up changes, which made it difficult to develop a clear style. Spin magazine placed them at the intersection of hardcore, metal and pop and assessed the band as "too offensive to be politically correct and too politically correct to be trend junkies". Spin author Charles M. Young described the band's music as an "independent, punk-influenced synthesis of wildness, moodiness, showmanship and versatile arrangements", and the 1987 album Implosion as having a "pleasant, all-encompassing 1968 feeling ". The blog Vinyl Journey stated singer Ielpi's live performance "gave you a picture of what a Communist Party gathering in a Cambodian madhouse would look like". The blog described the band as part of the hardcore scene, but highlighted the occasional use of piano and synthesizer in the music of the Prophets and attested to their closeness to classic British punk, but also to Alice Cooper and the Kinks.

According to ex-bassist Wishnia, the band itself found its inspiration both in the music of hardcore bands of the first generation such as Heart Attack, Undead or Reagan Youth as well as in the music of British post-punk bands such as Joy Division, Public Image Limited or Gang of Four.

== Discography ==
=== Studio albums ===
- False Prophets (1986, Alternative Tentacles)
- Implosion (1987, Alternative Tentacles)

=== Singles and EPs ===
- "Blind Obedience" 7" (1981, Worn Out Brothers)
- "Good Clean Fun" 7" (1982, Worn Out Brothers)
- Invisible People EP (1990, Konkurrel)

=== Compilation albums ===
- Blind Roaches and Fat Vultures: Phantasmagoric Beasts of the Reagan Era (2000, Alternative Tentacles)

=== Compilation appearances ===
- "Taxidermist" and "Scorched Earth" on New York Thrash (1982, ROIR)
- "Banana Split Republic" on International P.E.A.C.E. Benefit Compilation (1984, R Radical Records)
- "Never Again, Again" on Oops! Wrong Stereotype (1988, Alternative Tentacles)
- "Destructive Engagement" on BARK! BARK! BARK! (1988, Dead Issue Records)
- "The Invisible People" on What Else Do You Do? (A Compilation of Quiet Music) (1990, Shimmy Disc)
- "Tompkins Square Park" on Manhattan on the Rocks (2000, Pow Wow Records)
- "Overkill" on The Ecstasy of the Agony (2000, Alternative Tentacles)
- "Baghdad Stomp" on Against Police Injustice (2003, Non-Commercial Records)
