= Reverend Fred Lane =

American singer-songwriter

Tim R. Reed, known by the stage name Reverend Fred Lane, is an American, Tuscaloosa, Alabama-born singer, songwriter, and visual artist, who released two relatively obscure yet critically appreciated albums in the 1970s on Say Day Bew Records, later re-released in the 1980s on the Shimmy Disc label. These albums explored various traditional genres of American music such as jazz, country, and big-band swing, but infused with improvisational experimentations and Dadaist free-associative lyrics.

Lane was involved in the conceptual music scene at the University of Alabama in Tuscaloosa in the mid-seventies. He was a member of the Raudelunas Marching Vegetable Band collective, influenced by the ’pataphysical theories of Alfred Jarry. Subsequent "bands" included the Blue Denim Deals Without the Arms, The Raudelunas Arm Band and The Marching Booly Band. He played flute and alto flute for the improvisation company "Transcendprovisation" and appears on the 1976 Transmuseq LP release, Trans.

His stage persona displayed a devilish grin, goggle glasses, a well-oiled goatee, and various band-aids applied to his cheeks and scalp. He wore a black Tuxedo coat over boxer shorts. He authored comic books and chapbooks including Liquid Basketballs and Naked women Overthrow the Government Quarterly.

Lane's first album, From the One That Cut You, credited to Fred Lane & Ron Pate's Debonairs, was inspired by a somewhat illiterate threat note found in a 1952 Dodge panel truck. Ron Pate's Debonairs was a big band that included noted Alabama-based free improvisers Davey Williams and LaDonna Smith, both performing under aliases. ("Ron 'Pate," also a fictional name, refers to the word "'Pataphysics," which was coined by playwright Alfred Jarry.) His second album, Car Radio Jerome, credited to Fred Lane & the Hittite Hot-Shots, navigated his band through various hard-boiled, film noir scenarios, and was especially noted for the memorable parody of a children's nursery song, "The French Toast Man".

Reed left the music industry in the late 1980s to devote his career to mobile sculptures.

In 2019, a third Lane album, Icepick to the Moon, was released on Feeding Tube Records. The album shares a title with a 2019 documentary about Lane, Icepick to the Moon, but the album is not a soundtrack to the film.

The Nashville based psychedelic rock band Adjustable Mustard derives their name from the Reverend Fred Lane song "Hittite Hot Shot."
