= B.A.L.L. =

Band

- Origin: New York City, United States
- Genres: Alternative rock, Psychedelic rock, Noise rock, Grunge
- Years active: 1987–1990
- Label: Shimmy Disc
- Past members: Don Fleming; Kramer; David Licht; Jay Spiegel

B.A.L.L. (pronounced "ball") were an American alternative rock band from New York City, formed in 1987. The band was formed by Don Fleming, Kramer, David Licht and Jay Spiegel. After releasing 4 LP's (all Produced & Engineered by Kramer for his Shimmy-Disc label) and touring the US and Europe extensively with bands such as Sonic Youth and Teenage Fanclub, the band disintegrated in 1990, its members pursuing separate projects.

== Discography ==
Studio albums

- Period (Another American Lie) (Shimmy Disc, 1987)
- Bird (Shimmy Disc, 1988)
- Trouble Doll (The Disappointing 3rd LP) (Shimmy Disc, 1989)
- B.A.L.L. Four: Hardball (Shimmy Disc, 1990)

Compilations

- Bird/Period (Shimmy Disc, 1989)
