= Don Fleming (musician) =

American musician

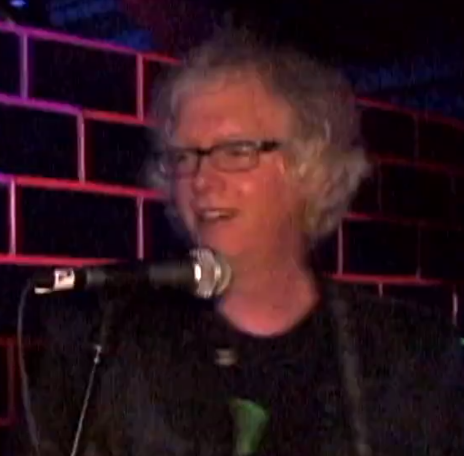
- Don Fleming in 2009

Background information
- Born: Donald Gene Fleming; September 25, 1957 (age 69); Valdosta, Georgia, U.S.
- Occupations: Musician, record producer
- Label: Thick Syrup
- Formerly of: The Velvet Monkeys; B.A.L.L.; Gumball

Donald Gene Fleming (born September 25, 1957) is an American musician and producer. Besides fronting a number of his own bands (Velvet Monkeys, B.A.L.L., and Gumball), Fleming has produced Sonic Youth, Screaming Trees, Teenage Fanclub, The Posies and Hole.

== Career ==
=== Bands ===
==== The Stroke Band ====
Fleming started his musical career with the art/garage/punk group The Stroke Band of Adel, Georgia in the late 1970s. They released one album, Green and Yellow, in 1978 on Abacus Records.

==== Citizen 23 ====
After The Stroke Band, Don relocated to Norfolk, Va. in 1979 and formed the punk/new wave group Citizen 23 with Elaine Barnes, Mark Myers, and, Stephen Soles. Their only recorded output consisted of three songs on the compilation album, No Room to Dance, in 1980.

==== The Velvet Monkeys ====
Citizen 23 broke up in early 1981; all members but Mark Mayers relocated to Washington, D.C. shortly thereafter, and Fleming next formed the three-piece psychedelic/post-punk band The Velvet Monkeys in the fall of 1981. The Velvet Monkeys line-up featured Fleming on guitar & vocals, Barnes on keyboards and vocals, Stephen Soles on bass, and a drum machine called Dr. Rhythm providing the beat. The Velvet Monkeys would go through many incarnations over the next 10 years, with Fleming the constant factor in all versions. In July 1982 the band released their debut -- Everything is Right—on cassette tape. This album was re-released on CD in 2011.

After trading in their drum machine for a live drummer (Jay "The Rummager" Spiegel) in 1981 and switching to a new bass player (Charles Steck) in early 1982, the band began to grow their following through increased gigging in the Washington, D.C., area and the Eastern Seaboard. This lineup released the album Future on Fountain of Youth Records in 1983.

In 1985, ousting all but Spiegel and himself, Fleming brought on guitarist & keyboardist Malcolm Riviera of D.C.'s Grand Mal. The band released the single "Spooky" on Go Records in spring 1985. Guitarist Stuart Casson, formerly of D.C.'s punk group Dove, was added as the fourth member in the fall. This lineup released the single "Colors (Part I&II)" on Bona Fide Records that summer.

In 1986, Casson left the band and Tom Kane joined as bassist. The band recorded a demo with Kane but it was not released. Kane was then replaced by bassist & vocalist Rob Kennedy, formerly of D.C.'s The Chumps and NYC's The Workdogs. The band did a three-week U.S. Tour with Half Japanese in the summer of 1986. Big Big Sun, a cassette of live recordings of both bands from that tour was released on K Records in fall 1986.

In 1987, Spiegel left the band and was replaced by drummer Scott Jarvis, formerly of N.C.'s Th' Cigaretz and NYC's The Workdogs (in which he had played with Kennedy). This lineup played recorded a session at Jag Studios in Raleigh, N.C., but the recordings were not released until 1998's Houseparty CD, a compilation of various unreleased Velvet Monkeys tracks.

By 1988, Fleming and Spiegel had re-located to New York City where they teamed up with former Shockabilly bass player and Shimmy Disc impresario Mark Kramer and drummer David Licht to form B.A.L.L. After that group's acrimonious demise, the trio of Fleming, Riviera and Spiegel reunited to form the next iteration of the Velvet Monkeys. Fleming expanded the band with notable indie musicians like Thurston Moore, J Mascis, Julia Cafritz and John Hammill of Pussy Galore. This lineup recorded the band's final album, a soundtrack parody called Rake that paid tribute to the 1970s blaxploitation film Shaft.

The band has never officially broken up, and Fleming continues to revive the group when the time is right.

==== Dinosaur Jr. ====
After Fleming and Spiegel's group B.A.L.L. broke up in 1990, the duo briefly joined Dinosaur Jr. and released "The Wagon" 45 on the Sub Pop label. The two left Dinosaur Jr. shortly after the release of the single.

==== Gumball ====
In 1990 Jay Spiegel approached his friend Eric Vermillion, a member of Camp Hill, PA's The Stump Wizards, about playing with himself and Fleming. Vermilion agreed and subsequently quit The Stump Wizards. After less than a week's rehearsal, the new trio played its first show and Gumball was born. Their first release came our shortly thereafter: an eponymous 12 inch EP on Paperhouse Records/Sire Records in England. In 1991 the band released the album Special Kiss, also on Paperhouse, and embarked on a tour with Mudhoney, Sonic Youth, and other similar American indie bands of the early 1990s.

In 1991, Gumball signed a two-album deal with Columbia Records and re-entered the studio to record their major-label debut, Super Tasty. The sessions were done in Wisconsin with producer Butch Vig (who later engineered Nirvana's major label debut Nevermind). Although Gumball recorded Super Tasty as a trio, fourth member (and longtime musical associate) Malcolm Riviera joined the band shortly after the album's release, and in 1993 the foursome toured the U.S., Europe, and Japan in support of the album. Gumball released their second album for Columbia, Revolution on Ice, in 1994 and toured in support of it throughout that year. The band left Columbia in 1994 and released the live album Tokyo Encore on their own label. By early 1995 the band called it quits rather than shopping for another label.

==== Other Bands ====
Fleming was also a member of the bands Dim Stars, Death Camp 2000, Half Japanese, Tabby Chinos, Idlewild, and Gravy. He has also made many guest appearance both live and in the studio with Brain Surgeons, Shotgun Rationale, Jad Fair, Los Straitjackets, Maureen Tucker, Steroid Maximus (Foetus), Tinklers, and Walking Seeds.

=== Solo Work ===
Don has released recordings on his personal label Instant Mayhem and on several other labels: Don Fleming 4 (a four-song EP with Fleming and artists Kim Gordon, Julia Cafritz and R. Stevie Moore); Super Bad @ 65 (compilation album released by Zero Hour records); the solo EP jojo ASS RUNne; Because Tomorrow Comes, a solo CD-3; the track "Adam's Fall" on compilation album 78 LTD (Thick Syrup Records); Telstar, featuring Thurston Moore & Fleming; the song "Sound as Steel" on the Guitarrorists CD (No. 6 Records); and the solo single "Real Cool Time" (Iridescence Records).

=== Music Projects ===
Don has played in and on many music projects throughout his career: Foot with Thurston Moore and Jimbo (aka Jim Dunbar); The Walter Sears with Tom Smith, Thurston Moore, Steve Shelley, Sean Lennon, Jim Dunbar and Rat Bastard; The Backbeat Band (a supergroup that recorded all the music for the film Backbeat, which focuses on The Beatles' early career); The Dripping Tap, a collaboration with R. Stevie Moore; Wylde Ratttz (band built around guitarist Ron Asheton to supply Stoogesque tracks for the film Velvet Goldmine); Rockin'ham (a NASCAR theme band); Dee/Don (Fleming plus Dee Pop, drummer from the Bush Tetras); and Badge (with A.J. Lambert on vocals/keys/guitar, Fran Azzarto on drums, Bil Emmons doing programming, and Matt Azzarto on guitar).

=== Producer ===
Fleming is also widely known as a record producer. He has recorded and produced such artists as Sonic Youth, Hole, Teenage Fanclub, The Posies, Alice Cooper, Andrew W.K., The Dictators, Joan Jett, Nancy Sinatra, Screaming Trees, The Smithereens, Pete Yorn, Bruce Joyner & the Reconstruction, Bracket, Hifiklub, Joe Hurley, Jenni Muldaur, To Live and Shave in L.A., Richard Hell, Jad Fair, Triple Fast Action, Swish, Steel Miners, Ann Magnuson, Free Kitten, Guv'ner, Rudolph Grey, STP (featuring Julia Cafritz of Pussy Galore), Action Swingers and many others.

== Other projects ==
With the Global Jukebox project, Fleming serves as executive director of the Association for Cultural Equity where he has worked since 1995 on the conservation and publication of the musical collection of Alan Lomax.

== Discography ==
(Note: B.A.L.L., and Gumball albums are not included in the following list).

=== Solo ===
- Jojo Ass Runne (1998)

=== The Velvet Monkeys ===
- Everything Is Right (1982)
- Future (1983)
- Rake (1990)
- Houseparty (1998)

=== With bands ===
Foot

- Foot CD Godbless 10-98
- Jeg Gelder Meg Til Ur 2000 CD Compilation "Armageddon" Universal 99

Walter Sears

- Walter Sears – Fringe Benefits, 1999

Gravy

- Gravy- After That It's All Gravy

Thurston Moore & Don Fleming

- Telstar 7" silver glitter vinyl w/ postcard Via Satellite Recordings 4/97

The Backbeat Band

- Backbeat Music from the Motion Picture CD, LP, CS Virgin Records 94
- Please Mr. Postman CD-3 Virgin 94
- Money CD-3 Virgin 94

Idlewild

- Delicacy & Nourishment Vol. 3 performing "Third Month March" CD Comp ESD 92

Tom Smith/Don Fleming

- Gin Blossoms CD-5, 7" Seminal Twang 91

Dinosaur Jr

- Green Mind, 1991

Citizen 23

- No Room to Dance Compilation LP includes "American Neutron", Twilight Zone" Blue Wave 1980

Stroke Band

- Green and Yellow LP Abacus Records 1978
