= Fly Ashtray =

American rock band

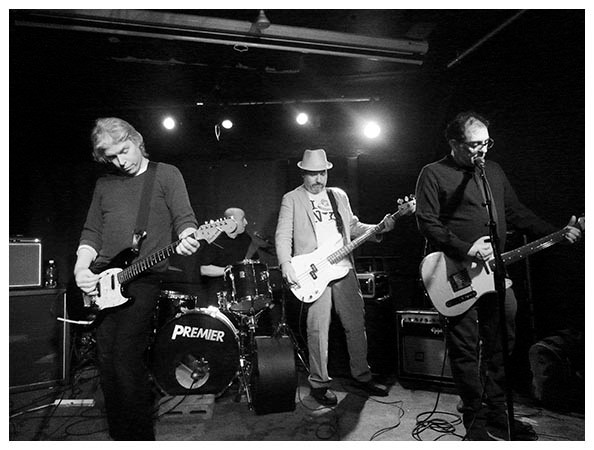

Background information
- Origin: New York City, New York, United States
- Genres: Indie rock, psychedelic rock, experimental rock, noise rock, lo-fi, power pop
- Years active: 1983–present
- Labels: Marble Moat, Shimmy Disc, See Eye, Hemiola, Vital Music, Dark Beloved Cloud, Old Gold, Fuzzy Warbles Cassettes
- Members: Chris Thomas; James Kavoussi; Dave Abel; Eric Marc Cohen
- Past members: Mike Anzalone; Eric Thomas; John Beekman; Glen Luttman
- Website: www.flyashtray.net

Fly Ashtray is an American rock band, formed in 1983 in the Bronx, New York, by Chris Thomas, James Kavoussi, Eric Thomas, John Beekman and Mike Anzalone. At some point, Thomas and Anzalone left the band which led to Beekman moving from lead vocalist to bassist/guitarist, and then Kavoussi switched from keyboard to guitar. Glen Luttman joined the band at this juncture to play the drums.

Spoog, a side project, resulted with impromptu gigs when one or another member of the band was out of town. Anzalone and Kavoussi also played in Uncle Wiggly. Kavoussi has made solo records billed as Phoaming Edison. The line-up of Thomas, Kavoussi, Beekman and Luttman was stable for a lengthy period until Beekman's duties were taken over in 1998 by Dave Abel.

In 2003, Luttman requested a leave of absence from Fly Ashtray. Eric Marc Cohen took over drum duties in the same year.

The band released two records on Shimmy Disc and worked with Kramer.

The band's music was featured in "Responsible Ballet and What We Need Is a Bench to Put Books On", a dance piece choreographed by Jon Kinzel, and performed at The Kitchen in New York City.

== Discography ==
=== Albums ===
- 1990 - Nothing Left to Spill
- 1991 - Clumps Takes a Ride
- 1994 - Tone Sensations of the Wonder-Men
- 1997 - Flummoxed
- 1999 - Sawgrass Subligette
- 2007 - The Pantswind Folder
- 2009 - Reports
- 2012 - Fly Ashtray
- 2016 - We Buy Everything You Have
- 2017 - Grit Is The New Privilege
- 2018 - Live at Rubulad March 3, 2018
- 2019 - Why Are You Asking Me?
- 2024 - Doggerel

=== Singles and EPs ===
- 1987 - The Day I Turned Into Jim Morrison
- 1990 - Extended Outlook
- 1991 - Soap / Bip / Feather
- 1992 - Let's Have Some Crate
- 1995 - Stop the Zockos
- 2007 - Doodnat Mahadeo
- 2020 - In the DSM Again / Air
- 2021 - Rigorous Deliverables / Why Can't Things Be a Little More Nifty?
