= 8-Track Heaven =

Website dedicated to 8-track tapes

- Founded: July 20, 1995
- Dissolved: 2024
- Country of origin: United States
- Founders: Malcolm Riviera; Abigail Lavine; Russ Forster; Chip Rowe
- Editor: Malcolm Riviera
- Website: web.archive.org/web/19981205220126/http://www.8trackheaven.com/

8-Track Heaven aka Eight-Track Heaven was a website that was dedicated to the 8-track cartridge and the associated equipment.

== Background ==
8-Track Heaven was founded on July 20, 1995 by Malcolm Riviera, Abigail Lavine, Russ Forster and Chip Rowe. It was described by The New York Times as a Web shrine containing a cache of trivia on collecting 8-tracks. The site offered help to the 8-track enthusiast by offering free ads, tips and links to other sites that featured the cartridges.

Founder Malcom Riviera, aka Gary C. Broyhill, was a well-known participant of the D.C. music scene during the 1980s and a member of bands such as Elevator, Grand Mal, Sub Primal Cuts, The Velvet Monkeys, and Gumball. He was also an enthusiast of eight-tracks and the history surrounding them. Riviera was also the webmaster for the site. He also founded the alt.collecting.8-track-tapes newsgroup. According to a 2004 article by The Journal Record, Riviera was "regarded as something of a god in 8-track circles". He was also an article contributor and had contributed an article to the summer/fall 1996 issue of Chunklet magazine.

Abbey Lavine was also a singer. She sang lead on the song "Alligator" by the garage band Soul Assassins. She was also part of the backing group, the Assassinettes.

Russ Forster, a musician, founder of Underdog Records and member of bands; Gore Gore Girls, Spongetunnel and Dashing Marble was the editor of the fanzine 8-Track Mind.

The website was listed on page 406 of the 1997 edition of the New Rider's official World Wide Web yellow pages directory, and page 538 of the 1998 edition of Official Microsoft Bookshelf Internet directory. There were no similar sites in both of the directories.

== History ==
By 1995, the website was online.

During the 1990s there were still a few eight track albums being released. 8-Track Heaven profiled these releases.

In 1995, Eight Track Heaven founder Russ Forster released the film So Wrong They’re Right, a film about the eight-track. It also featured Abbey Lavine. An article about the film appeared in the 12 August 1996 issue of Variety. It won an award for best feature-length documentary at the 1995 Chicago Underground Film Festival.

Co-founder Abbey Lavine died in 1997. An album Links Outta Here which is dedicated to her was released on the Generator Sound Art that year.

Eight-Track Heaven was included in the "What to Surf" article by Entertainment Weekly that was published on 2 October 1998. It was given a B+ rating.

In October 2008, 8-Track Heaven joined Twitter.

== Later years ==
Malcom Riviera died circa July / August 2023. Following his death, the website was still active until the domain expired in the early summer of 2024.
