= Ruins (Japanese band) =

Japanese music duo

- Origin: Tokyo, Japan
- Genres: Progressive rock; experimental rock; zeuhl; math rock; noise rock; avant-prog; post-hardcore; free improvisation; noise; jazz fusion
- Years active: 1985–present
- Labels: Shimmy Disc, Tzadik, Ipecac, Skin Graft, Magaibutsu Limited, Sonore, Trans, SSE Communications, Nipp Guitar
- Members: Tatsuya Yoshida
- Past members: Hideki Kawamoto; Kazuyoshi Kimoto; Ryuichi Masuda; Hisashi Sasaki

Ruins is a Japanese music duo composed only of drummer/vocalist Tatsuya Yoshida and a bass guitarist (there have been four such bassists in the band's history). The group, formed in 1985, was supposedly intended to be a power trio; the guitarist, however, never showed up to the band's first rehearsal so the group remained a duo. The music touches on progressive rock, jazz fusion and noise rock.

== Background ==
The French progressive rock band Magma is the group's most important influence, to such an extent that Ruins' original lyrics are written and sung in an invented language which, at first glance, resembles Kobaïan, the language invented by Christian Vander of Magma. Ruins' material (which Yoshida, who composes the majority of their pieces, writes out in score form) is generally of extreme complexity and thus is often described as inaccessible; potential listeners may be bewildered by the band's unrestrained yet disciplined approach.

In addition to the "prog rock" label, the group's music has also been described as "math rock" and "zeuhl". That said, Ruins' style has consistently evolved since the band's beginning, often changing according to the bassist that Tatsuya was collaborating with at the time.

Ruins have collaborated with several other musicians, including prominent avant-garde figure Derek Bailey, auteur guitarist/multi-instrumentalist Keiji Haino, and Ground Zero alumnus Kazuhisa Uchihashi.

Bassist Hisashi Sasaki left the band in 2004, and since then Yoshida has been touring solo under the name Ruins-alone (Ruins Alone). He has also performed as Sax Ruins with alto saxophonist Ryoko Ono. He was chosen by Matt Groening to perform at the All Tomorrow's Parties festival Groening curated in May 2010 in Minehead, England.

On September 6, 2016, Tatsuya announced via his Facebook that third period bassist Ryuichi Masuda would be rejoining the band for a show in December and shows throughout the spring.

== Members ==
Current members

- Tatsuya Yoshida – drums, percussion, programming, 12-string guitar, vocals (1985–present)

Former members

- Hideki Kawamoto – bass (1985–1987)
- Kazuyoshi Kimoto – bass, vocals, violin (1987–1990)
- Ryuichi Masuda – bass, vocals (1991–1997, 2016)
- Hisashi Sasaki – bass, vocals, MIDI controller (1995–2004)

Timeline

== Discography ==
- Ruins III (1988, reissued as Infect in 1993)
- Stonehenge (1990)
- Burning Stone (1992)
- Graviyaunosch (1993)
- Hyderomastgroningem (1995)
- Refusal Fossil (1997, reissued in 2007)
- Vrresto (1998)
- Symphonica (1998)
- Pallaschtom (2000)
- Tzomborgha (2002)
- Yawiquo (as Sax Ruins; 2009)
- Alone (as Ruins Alone; 2011)
- Blimmguass (as Sax Ruins; 2013)

== EPs, live releases, and compilations ==
- Ruins (EP) (1986)
- Ruins II (EP) (1987)
- Early Works: Live & Unreleased Tracks (1991)
- II & 19 Numbers (1992)
- EP (1992)
- 0'33" (live album)(1993)
- Split with Dawson (1993)
- Split with Schlong (1994)
- March–October 1997 (1997, 2002, 2003)
- Mandala 2000: Live at the Kichijoji Mandala II (2000)
- 1986-1992 (2001)
- Live in Guangzhou (2002)
- Ales Stenar (2001)
- Split with High on Fire (2005)

Collaborations

- Ruins & Umezu Kazutoki (1994, with Umezu Kazutoki)
- Hatoba & Ruins (1994, with Omoide Hatoba)
- Saisoro (1995, with Derek Bailey)
- Jason Willet & Ruins (1995, with Jason Willet)
- Tohjinbo (1997, with Derek Bailey)
- Ketsunoana (1998, with Ron Anderson)
- Big Shoes (2001, with Ron Anderson)
- Kazuhisa Uchihashi & Ruins (1998, with Kazuhisa Uchihashi)
- Death Seed (2000, with Guapo and The Shock Exchange)
- Live In Europe (2001, with Kazuhisa Uchihashi)
- Knead (2002, with Keiji Haino)
- New Rap (2006, with Keiji Haino)
- Uhrfasudhasdd (2008, with Keiji Haino)
- Hauenfiomiume (2008, with Keiji Haino)
- 2008 New Japan Festival (2008, with various artists, including Ruins-Alone)

== Videos ==
- Ruins Kansai Tour (1988)
- Live In West Coast ‘93 (1993)

== See also ==
- Romantic Warriors II: A Progressive Music Saga About Rock in Opposition
- Romantic Warriors II: Special Features DVD
