= Kramer discography =

- Studio albums: 32
- Live albums: 1
- Compilation albums: 1
- Singles: 3

This article presents the complete oeuvre of American musician, composer and record producer Kramer, including his work as a band member and collaborating artist.

== As a solo artist ==
=== Studio albums ===
Title	Album details
The Guilt Trip	Released: 1992 (US); Label: Shimmy Disc; Formats: CD, CS, LP
The Secret of Comedy	Released: August 5, 1994 (US); Label: Shimmy Disc; Formats: CD
Let Me Explain Something to You About Art	Released: January 20, 1998 (US); Label: Tzadik; Formats: CD
Songs from the Pink Death	Released: February 17, 1998 (US); Label: Shimmy Disc; Formats: CD
The Greenberg Variations	Released: March 25, 2003 (US); Label: Tzadik; Formats: CD
The Brill Building	Released: September 25, 2012 (US); Label: Tzadik; Formats: CD
The Brill Building, Book Two, Featuring Bill Frisell	Released: December 5, 2017 (US); Label: Tzadik (Spectrum Series); Formats: CD

=== Collaborative albums ===
Year	Title	Notes
1987	Happiness Finally Came to Them	With Ralph Carney and Daved Hild
1988	Roll Out the Barrel	With Jad Fair
1991	Real Men	With John S. Hall
1992	Who's Afraid?	With Daevid Allen
1993	Egomaniacs	With Kim Fahy and Jamie Harley
1994	Hot Day in Waco	With Dogbowl
1994	A Remark Hugh Made	With Hugh Hopper
1994	Black Power	With Ralph Carney and Daved Hild
1996	Gunsmoke	With Dogbowl
1996	Tattoo of Blood	With Penn Jillette
1996	Hit Men	With Daevid Allen
1997	Rubber Hair	With Daved Hild
1997	Huge	With Hugh Hopper
1998	Money Feeds My Music Machine	With Penn Jillette
1998	Reasons in the Sun	With Tammy Lang
1999	The Sound of Music	With Jad Fair
2025	Interior of an Edifice Under the Sea	With Pan American
2026	They Came Like Swallows – Seven Requiems for the Children of Gaza	With Thurston Moore

=== Live albums ===
Title	Album details
Still Alive in '95	Released: February 1, 1996 (JP); Label: Creativeman Disc.; Formats: CD

=== Compilation albums ===
Title	Album details
Music for Crying	Released: 1995 (JP); Label: Creativeman Disc.; Formats: CD

== Shockabilly ==
=== Studio albums ===
Title	Album details
Earth vs. Shockabilly	Released: 1983 (UK); Label: Rough Trade; Formats: LP
Colosseum	Released: 1984 (UK); Label: Rough Trade; Formats: LP
Vietnam	Released: 1984 (UK); Label: Fundamental; Formats: LP
Heaven	Released: 1985 (UK); Label: Fundamental; Formats: LP

=== Extended plays ===
Title	Album details
The Dawn of Shockabilly	Released: 1982 (UK); Label: Rough Trade; Formats: LP
Greatest Hits	Released: 1983 (NL); Label: Red Music; Formats: LP

=== Singles ===
Year	Title	Album
1983	19th Nervous Breakdown / City of Corruption	Earth vs. Shockabilly

=== Live albums ===
Title	Album details
Live: ...Just Beautiful	Released: 1989 (US); Label: Shimmy Disc; Formats: CD, CS, LP

=== Compilation albums ===
Title	Album details
The Ghost of Shockabilly	Released: 1989 (UK); Label: Shimmy Disc; Formats: CD
Vietnam/Heaven	Released: January 1990 (NL); Label: Shimmy Disc; Formats: CD, CS

== Bongwater ==
=== Studio albums ===
Title	Album details
Double Bummer	Released: 1988 (US); Label: Shimmy Disc; Formats: CD, CS, LP
Too Much Sleep	Released: 1989 (US); Label: Shimmy Disc; Formats: CD, CS, LP
The Power of Pussy	Released: 1990 (US); Label: Shimmy Disc; Formats: CD, CS, LP
The Big Sell-Out	Released: March 1992 (US); Label: Shimmy Disc; Formats: CD, LP

=== Extended plays ===
Title	Album details
Breaking No New Ground!	Released: 1987 (US); Label: Shimmy Disc; Formats: LP
The Peel Session	Released: 1992 (NL); Label: Strange Fruit; Formats: CD

=== Singles ===
Year	Title	Album
1988	You Don't Love Me Yet / The Porpoise Song	Non-album singles

=== Compilation albums ===
Title	Album details
Box of Bongwater	Released: 1998 (US); Label: Shimmy Disc; Formats: CD

== B.A.L.L. ==
=== Studio albums ===
Title	Album details
Period	Released: 1987 (US); Label: Shimmy Disc; Formats: LP
Bird	Released: 1989 (US); Label: Shimmy Disc; Formats: LP
Trouble Doll	Released: 1989 (US); Label: Shimmy Disc; Formats: CD, CS, LP
B.A.L.L. Four: Hardball	Released: 1990 (US); Label: Shimmy Disc; Formats: CD, CS, LP

=== Compilation albums ===
Title	Album details
Bird/Period	Released: 1989 (US); Label: Shimmy Disc; Formats: CD, CS

== Credits ==
=== Performance credits ===
Year	Artist	Release	Role(s)	Song(s)
1979	Eugene Chadbourne	2000 Statues and the English Channel	organ, trombone	—
1980	New York Gong	About Time	organ	"Hours Gone"
1981	John Zorn	Archery	organ, synthesizer, tape	—
1982	The Waitresses	Wasn't Tomorrow Wonderful?	tape	"Jimmy Tomorrow"
1982	Daevid Allen	The Death of Rock & Other Entrances	piano	"Poet for Sale"
1982	Gilli Smyth	Live in Usa 79	keyboards, synthesizer, trombone	—
1982	Daevid Allen	Alien in New York (12")	trombone	"Bananareggae"
1982	The Fugs	Baskets of Love	bass guitar, keyboards	—
1985	The Fugs	Refuse to Be Burnt-Out	bass guitar	—
1987	Eugene Chadbourne	LSDC&W – The History of the Chadbournes in America	organ, tape	"The Beatles Medley", "In a Sentimental Mood (The Duke) (Pt. 1)", "In a Sentimental Mood (Pt. 2)", "W Va Spec (Zorn Tribute)"
1987	Rebby Sharp	Against No Wall	vocals	"Just in Time"
1987	Rebby Sharp	Against No Wall	trombone	"Some Men", "(Into) Hesitation Blues"
1987	The Shaved Pigs	Breakfast Is Served	electric guitar	"She's Pop"
1987	Tenko	Slope	banjo	"The Time Drawers"
1987	Half Japanese	U.S. Teens Are Spoiled Bums (7")	organ	—
1987	Half Japanese	Music to Strip By	banjo	"Ancient Life"
1987	Bongos, Bass & Bob	Never Mind The Sex Pistols, Here's Bongos, Bass, and Bob (What on Earth Were They Thinking???)	accordion	"Walkin' in the Park"
1987	Bongos, Bass & Bob	Never Mind The Sex Pistols, Here's Bongos, Bass, and Bob (What on Earth Were They Thinking???)	horns	"Die Tryin' to Escape"
1987	Bongos, Bass & Bob	Never Mind The Sex Pistols, Here's Bongos, Bass, and Bob (What on Earth Were They Thinking???)	percussion	"Rent Control (Our Life Together)"
1987	Bongos, Bass & Bob	Never Mind The Sex Pistols, Here's Bongos, Bass, and Bob (What on Earth Were They Thinking???)	slide guitar	"Clearly Unhealthy"
1987	Bongos, Bass & Bob	Never Mind The Sex Pistols, Here's Bongos, Bass, and Bob (What on Earth Were They Thinking???)	strings	"Mr. Lemke"
1987	Bongos, Bass & Bob	Never Mind The Sex Pistols, Here's Bongos, Bass, and Bob (What on Earth Were They Thinking???)	whistle	"Clothes of the Dead", "Li'l Bluebird"
1989	Dogbowl	Tit! An Opera	bass guitar, guitar, percussion, backing vocals	—
1989	Dogbowl	Tit! An Opera	organ	"Starving for Love"
1989	The Tinklers	Casserole	slide guitar, keyboards	—
1989	When People Were Shorter and Lived Near the Water	Bobby	bass guitar, slide guitar	—
1989	Galaxie 500	On Fire	organ, backing vocals	"Isn't It a Pity"
1989	Half Japanese	The Band That Would Be King	bass guitar, organ	—
1989	King Missile	They	slide guitar, keyboards	—
1989	Rebby Sharp	In One Mouth and Out the Other	vocals, bass guitar, alto trombone, percussion	—
1989	Daniel Johnston	1990	vocals, tape	"Some Things Last a Long Time"
1991	Dogbowl	Cyclops Nuclear Submarine Captain	organ, backing vocals	—
1991	Krackhouse	Drink. It's Legal	grand piano	—
1991	Lida Husik	Bozo	slide guitar	"Billboard"
1991	Paleface	Paleface	bass guitar	"She Was Talking to Me (Down on Ave. B)", "Trouble in the Country", "Burn and Rob"
1991	Paleface	Paleface	keyboards	"There's Something About a Truck (What It Is)"
1992	Daevid Allen & New York Gong	Live in the USA	keyboards, trombone	—
1992	Trains and Boats and Planes	Engulfed	flute	—
1992	Damon and Naomi	More Sad Hits	vocals, instruments	—
1992	King Missile	Happy Hour	Mellotron	"Take Me Home"
1992	King Missile	Happy Hour	bass guitar	"Heaven"
1992	Luna	Lunapark	piano	"I Want Everything"
1992	Luna	Lunapark	Hammond organ	"We're Both Confused"
1993	Lida Husik	The Return of Red Emma	bass guitar	"Highgate", "AZT NO", "Bustop"
1993	Lida Husik	The Return of Red Emma	Hammond organ	"Highgate", "Bustop"
1993	Workdogs	Roberta	piano	"Rob K's Money Crazy Boogie"
1993	Raymond Listen	Licorice Root Orchestra	bass guitar	"Coronation Day"
1993	When People Were Shorter and Lived Near the Water	Bill Kennedy's Showtime	bass guitar	—
1994	Blueberrie Spy	Sing Sing	guitar	—
1994	Helen Shields	The 7 Inch Pig E.P. (7")	piano	"Pig"
1995	Damon and Naomi	The Wondrous World of Damon & Naomi	bass guitar, electric guitar, synthesizer, Mellotron, tape, clarinet, backing vocals	—
1995	Low	Long Division	Mellotron	"Swingin'"
1996	Ancestors	The Wondrous World of Damon & Naomi	bass guitar, synthesizer	—
1996	The Furthurs	From The Wells Of Disappointment	backing vocals	"Future Perfect", "The Red Sun"
1996	The Furthurs	From The Wells Of Disappointment	grand piano	"Best Wishes"
1996	The Furthurs	From The Wells Of Disappointment	Mellotron	"Stay With Yourself"
1996	The Furthurs	From The Wells Of Disappointment	synthesizer	"The Red Sun"
1998	Drazy Hoops	Straight to Black	keyboards, piano, organ, vocals	—
1999	Milksop Holly	Time to Come In	bass guitar, guitars, backing vocals	—
2000	Adult Rodeo	Texxxas	voice	"Beliablo"
2000	Adult Rodeo	Texxxas	organ	"Celebrity Bingo"
2002	Linda Draper	Patchwork	instruments	—
2003	John Zorn	Voices in the Wilderness	vocals, instruments	"Khebar"
2003	R. Stevie Moore	Nevertheless Optimistic	bass guitar, percussion	"Hug Me"
2007	Dot Allison	Exaltation of Larks	bass guitar, keyboards, sampler	"Allelujah", "In Deep Water", "You Dropped Your Soul", "M'Aidez Call", "Tall Flowers", "Quicksand", "Shivering", "The Latitude and Longitude of Mystery"
2007	Dot Allison	Exaltation of Larks	acoustic guitar, keyboards, Mellotron, sampler	"Sunset"
2007	Dot Allison	Exaltation of Larks	electric guitar	"The Latitude and Longitude of Mystery"
2007	Little Aida	Mad Country	Mellotron	"Like It Was Before", "Ten Walls"
2007	The Mabuses	Mabused!	bass guitar	"Russian Roulette"
2007	Rope, Inc	Songs of Love & War	electric guitar	—
2007	Caucus	空と時間軸 E.P.	Hammond organ	—
2008	22-Pistepirkko	Texxxas	backing vocals	"Crazy Meat", "The Others"
2008	22-Pistepirkko	Texxxas	keyboards	"Aquarius Zero"
2008	Bingo Quixote/Media Circus Extravaganza!	Blue Highway/End of an Error	organ, vocals	—
2008	Jacques Duvall	Le Cowboy et La Call-Girl	Hammond organ, Mellotron	—
2008	Flavor Crystals	Ambergris	piano	"Snobrite"
2008	Hilde Marie Kjersem	A Killer for That Ache	organ	"Midwest Country"
2008	The Orange Beach	Fuzz You!!!	vibraphone	"Barbon"
2014	Jad Fair & Danielson	Solid Gold Heart	bass guitar	—
