= Shimmy Disc discography =

Shimmy-Disc is an American independent record label founded in 1987 by Kramer. It served as an outlet for artists such as Dogbowl, Bongwater, Lida Husik, Daniel Johnston and Kramer's own solo and collaborative work. The label became defunct in 1998 after Kramer's legal suit with Ann Magnuson dried up most of his finances.

== List of releases ==
=== United States discography ===
No.	Year	Artist	Title	Format
001	1987	Various artists	The 20th Anniversary of the Summer of Love	CD, CS, LP
002	1987	Bongwater	Breaking No New Ground!	LP
003	1987	King Missile	Fluting on the Hump	LP
004	1987	Sharky's Machine	Let's Be Friends	LP
005	1987	Krackhouse	The Whole Truth	LP
006	1987	B.A.L.L.	Period (Another American Lie)	LP
007	1987	Carney • Hild • Kramer	Happiness Finally Came to Them	LP
008	1987	Men & Volts	The Mule	LP
010	1987	Gwar	Hell-o!	CS, LP
011	1988	Bongwater	Double Bummer	CD, CS, LP
012	1988	Jad Fair and Kramer	Roll Out the Barrel	CS, LP
013	1988	Fred Lane and His Hittite Hot Shots	Car Radio Jerome	CD, LP
014	1988	B.A.L.L.	Bird	LP
015	1988	King Missile	They	CD, LP
016	1988	Spongehead	Potted Meat Spread	LP
017	1988	Shockabilly	Earth vs. Shockabilly	LP
018	1989	Velvet Monkeys	Rotting Corpse Au-Go-Go	CS, LP
019	1989	Various artists	Lyrics by Ernest Noyes Brookings	CS, LP
020	1989	Tuli Kupferberg	Tuli & Friends	LP
021	1989	Fred Lane	From the One That Cut You	LP
022	1989	B.A.L.L.	Trouble Doll	CS, LP
023	1989	Dogbowl	Tit! An Opera	CS, LP
024	1989	When People Were Shorter and Lived Near the Water	Bobby	CS, LP
025	1989	The Tinklers	Casserole	CS, LP
026	1989	Shockabilly	Vietnam/Heaven	CS
027	1989	Shockabilly	Live: ...Just Beautiful	CS, LP
028	1990	Daniel Johnston	1990	CD, CS, LP
029	1990	King Missile	Mystical Shit	CS, LP
030	1990	B.A.L.L.	B.A.L.L. Four: Hardball	CD, CS, LP
031	1989	Bongwater	Too Much Sleep	CD, CS, LP
032	1990	Rebby Sharp	In One Mouth and Out the Other	CS, LP
033	1990	Jellyfish Kiss	Plank	CS, LP
034	1990	Various artists	What Else Do You Do?	CD, CS, LP
035	1990	Boredoms	Soul Discharge	CS, LP
036	1990	Walkingseeds	Bad Orb, Whirling Ball	LP
037	1990	Ruins	Stonehenge	CD, CS, LP
038	1990	Jellyfish Kiss	Animal Rights	LP
039	1990	Naked City	Torture Garden	CD, CS, LP
040	1990	Bongwater	The Power of Pussy	CD, CS, LP
041	1990	Various artists	Rutles Highway Revisited	CD, LP
042	1991	John S. Hall & Kramer	Real Men	CD, CS, LP
043	1991	Dogbowl	Cyclops Nuclear Submarine Captain	CD, CS, LP
044	1991	When People Were Shorter and Lived Near the Water	Porgy	CD, CS, LP
045	1991	The Tinklers	Saplings	CD, CS, LP
046	1991	Lida Husik	Bozo	CD, CS, LP
047	1991	Jellyfish Kiss	Stormy Weather	CD, CS, LP
048	1991	Daniel Johnston	Artistic Vice	CD, CS, LP
049	1991	Ween	The Pod	CD, CS, LP
050	1992	Bongwater	The Big Sell-Out	CD, LP
051	1991	Uncle Wiggly	Across the Room and Into Your Lap	CD, CS, LP
052	1991	The Mabuses	The Mabuses	CD, CS, LP
053	1992	Dogbowl	Flan	CD, CS, LP
054	1991	False Front	Dude	CD, CS, LP
055	1992	Kramer	The Guilt Trip	CD, CS, LP
056	1992	Lida Husik	Your Bag	CD, CS, LP
057	1992	Ruins	Burning Stone	CD, CS, LP
058	1992	Damon & Naomi	More Sad Hits	CD, CS, LP
059	1992	Grenadine	Goya	CD, CS, LP
060	1992	Daevid Allen and Kramer	Who's Afraid?	CD, CS, LP
061	1993	Uncle Wiggly	There Was an Elk	CD, LP
062	1993	Lida Husik	The Return of Red Emma	CD, CS, LP
063	1993	Dogbowl	Project Success	CD, LP
064	1993	When People Were Shorter and Lived Near the Water	Bill Kennedy's Showtime	CD, LP
065	1993	The Tinklers	Crash	CD, LP
066	1993	False Front	Criminal Kind	CD, LP
067	1993	Roger Manning	Roger Manning	CD, LP
068	1993	Fahy • Harley • Kramer	Egomaniacs	CD, LP
069	1993	Raymond Listen	Licorice Root Orchestra	CD, CS, LP
070	1993	Trains and Boats and Planes	Minimal Star	CD, LP
071	1993	Fly Ashtray	Tone Sensations of the Wondermen	CD, LP
072	1994	Tin Ear	The Gospel of Tin Ear	CD
073	1994	Dogbowl & Kramer	Hot Day in Waco	CD
074	1994	Bulkhead	Gas Giants	CD, LP
075	1994	Kramer	The Secret of Comedy	CD
076	1994	Hugh Hopper & Kramer	A Remark Hugh Made	CD
077	1994	Carney • Hild • Kramer	Black Power	CD
078	1995	The Semibeings	Sickness and Health	CD
079	1995	Blueberrie Spy	Sing Sing	CD
080	1996	Daevid Allen and Kramer	Hit Men	CD
081	1995	Paleface	Raw	CD
082	1995	Tin Ear	Ballad of a Tin Band	CD
083	1996	Dogbowl & Kramer	Gunsmoke	CD
084	1996	The Captain Howdy	Tattoo of Blood	CD
085	1998	Kramer	Songs from the Pink Death	CD
086	1995	E-Trance	E-Trance	CD
087	1997	Kramer and Daved Hild	Rubber Hair	CD
088	1997	Hugh Hopper & Kramer	Huge	CD
089	1998	Drazy Hoops	Straight to Black	CD
090	1998	King Missile	Failure	CD
091	1998	The Captain Howdy	Money Feeds My Music Machine	CD
092	1998	Glen or Glenda	Reasons in the Sun	CD
093	1998	The Blue Whale	The Blue Whale (Congregation)	CD
094	1999	Milksop Holly	Milkweeds	CD
095	1999	Jad Fair and Kramer	The Sound of Music	CD
096	1999	Brainville	The Children's Crusade	CD
097	1999	Adult Rodeo	The Kissyface	CD
098	1999	Milksop Holly	Time to Come In	CD
099	1999	Adult Rodeo	Texxxas	CD
100	1999	The Ladytron	The Ladytron	CD
101	1999	The Blue Whale	Wind Runs Through It	CD
103	1999	The Du-Tels	No Knowledge of Music Required	CD

=== European discography ===
No.	Year	Artist	Title	Format
8901	1988	Bongwater	Double Bummer	CD, LP
8902	1988	Jad Fair and Kramer	Roll Out the Barrel	CD, LP
8903	1989	B.A.L.L.	Bird	LP
8905	1989	Velvet Monkeys	Rotting Corpse Au-Go-Go	CD, LP
8906	1989	Shockabilly	The Ghost of Shockabilly	CD
8907	1989	B.A.L.L.	Bird/Period	CD
8908	1989	Galaxie 500	Today	LP
8909	1989	B.A.L.L.	Trouble Doll	CD, LP
8910	1988	Gwar	Hell-o!	CD
8911	1993	Fred Lane and His Hittite Hot Shots	From The One That Cut You + Car Radio Jerome	CD
8912	1989	Jad Fair and Kramer	Roll Out the Barrel	CD
8913	1989	When People Were Shorter and Lived Near the Water	Bobby	CD, LP
8914	1990	Shockabilly	Live: ...Just Beautiful	CD, LP
9015	1990	Daniel Johnston	1990	CD, LP
9016	1990	King Missile	Mystical Shit & Fluting on the Hump	CD
9017	1990	Bongwater	Too Much Sleep	CD, LP
9018	1990	B.A.L.L.	B.A.L.L. Four: Hardball	CD, LP
9020	1990	Rebby Sharp	In One Mouth and Out the Other	CD, LP
9021	1990	Various artists	What Else Do You Do?	CD, LP
9022	1990	Walkingseeds	Bad Orb, Whirling Ball	CD
9023	1990	King Missile	They	CD
9024	1990	Various artists	The 20th Anniversary of the Summer of Love	CD
9025	1990	Ruins	Stonehenge	CD
9026	1990	Shockabilly	Vietnam/Heaven	CD
9027	1990	Carney • Hild • Kramer	Happiness Finally Came to Them	CD
9028	1990	Various artists	Rutles Highway Revisited	CD
9029	1990	Jellyfish Kiss	Animal Rites	CD
9030	1991	Dogbowl	Tit! An Opera	CD
9031	1991	Boredoms	Soul Discharge/Early Boredoms	CD
9032	1991	The Tinklers	Casserole	CD
9033	1991	Tuli Kupferberg	No Deposit, No Return/Tuli & Friends	CD
9034	1991	Bongwater	The Power of Pussy	CD
9035	1991	Dogbowl	Cyclops Nuclear Submarine Captain	CD
9036	1991	John S. Hall & Kramer	Real Men	CD
9037	1992	Daniel Johnston	Artistic Vice	CD, LP
9038	1992	Ween	The Pod	CD, LP
9039	1992	Bongwater	The Big Sell-Out	CD, LP
9040	1992	Lida Husik	Bozo	CD, LP
9041	1992	Perverted by Desire	La Sigla Del Sadico Esperto	CD, LP

=== Boot discography ===
No.	Year	Artist	Title	Format
1	1994	Velvet Cactus Society	8 Songs	CD
2	1993	Sherman	Transparent Extender	CD
3	1993	Ovarian Trolley	Crocodile Tears	CD
4	1993	Gerrymander Bob	Meat Town	CD
5	1993	Perverted by Desire	Kuvun Huuto	CD
6	1993	Weld	Heavens to Mergatroid	CD
7	1994	A.T.S.	Blood Drive	CD
8	1993	Twelve: 01	Magically Delicious	CD
9	1994	Croatan	A Hundred More Verses About Agamemnon	CD
11	1994	Jehova Waitresses	Perfect Impossible	CD
12	1995	The Exploding Kind	Sugar Pill	CD
13	1994	Boogie Man Smash	Boogie Man Smash	CD
15	1994	Trouser	Ketchups	CD
16	1995	Velvet Cactus Society	Happiness Or Death	CD
17	1994	The Differents	Scratch	CD
18	1995	The Nutley Brass	The Nutley Brass Plays the Greatest Hits of Shimmy-Disc	CD
