= Music for Crying =

Compilation album by Kramer
- Released: August 1995
- Recorded: 1985 – 1994
- Studio: Various: Noise New York; (New York City, NY); Noise New Jersey; (Jersey City, NJ)
- Genre: Experimental rock
- Length: 65:34
- Label: Creativeman Disc.
- Producer: Kramer

Kramer chronology
Black Power (1994)	Music for Crying (1995)	Gunsmoke (1996)

Music for Crying is a compilation album by Kramer, released in August 1995 by Creativeman Disc. It comprises recordings made between 1985 and 1994, covering both his solo and collaborative work.

== Track listing ==
No.	Title	Writer(s)	Artist (recording date)	Length
1.	"We Can Work It Out" (from A Remark Hugh Made)	Lennon–McCartney	Hugh Hopper & Kramer (1994)	2:23
2.	"Stupid Summer" (from The Guilt Trip)	Mark Kramer	Kramer (1992)	2:54
3.	"Tears Come Down" (from Black Power)	Ralph Carney, Daved Hild, Mark Kramer	Carney • Hild • Kramer (1994)	2:26
4.	"The Juliet E-Mail" (from Tattoo of Blood)	Penn Jillette, Mark Kramer	Captain Howdy (1993)	3:08
5.	"Palm Wine on Palm Sunday" (from Hot Day in Waco)	Dogbowl	Dogbowl & Kramer (1993)	4:14
6.	"You Don't Know" (from The Guilt Trip)	Mark Kramer	Kramer (1992)	3:06
7.	"Slowly" (from Happiness Finally Came to Them)	Ralph Carney, Mark Kramer	Carney • Hild • Kramer (1987)	2:31
8.	"Nine Minus Seven Is Two" (from The Secret of Comedy)	Mark Kramer	Kramer (1994)	4:58
9.	"The Raven" (from Egomaniacs)	Kim Fahy, Jamie Harley, Mark Kramer	Fahy • Harley • Kramer (1993)	3:18
10.	"Thinking Thoughts" (from Who's Afraid?)	Daevid Allen, Mark Kramer	Daevid Allen and Kramer (1993)	3:14
11.	"Birth" (from The 20th Anniversary of the Summer of Love 1987-1967)	Coby Batty, Mark Kramer, David Licht	The Moon (1987)	3:02
12.	"Strings" (from The Secret of Comedy)	Mark Kramer	Kramer (1994)	3:35
13.	"Subterranean Homesick Blues" (from Roll Out the Barrel)	Bob Dylan	Jad Fair and Kramer (1988)	1:21
14.	"End" (from Happiness Finally Came to Them)	Ralph Carney, Daved Hild, Mark Kramer, Pete Plumbly	Carney • Hild • Kramer (1987)	2:32
15.	"Rain" (Beatles cover from Double Bummer)	John Lennon	Bongwater (1988)	5:38
16.	"Next Time, Try Compassion" (from The Guilt Trip)	Mark Kramer	Kramer (1992)	3:53
17.	"Tattoo of Blood" (from Tattoo of Blood)	Lou Reed	Captain Howdy (1993)	4:24
18.	"Free Will & Testament" (from A Remark Hugh Made)	Mark Kramer, Robert Wyatt	Hugh Hopper & Kramer (1994)	3:17
19.	"I Can Watch" (from The Secret of Comedy)	Mark Kramer	Kramer (1994)	5:40

== Personnel ==
Adapted from Music for Crying liner notes.

- Kramer – vocals, instruments, production, engineering

== Release history ==
Region	Date	Label	Format	Catalog
Japan	1995	Creativeman Disc.	CD	CMDD-00011
