= Let It Come Down (band) =

- Origin: New York City, United States
- Genres: Art rock
- Years active: 2016-present
- Labels: Shimmy Disc, Joyful Noise Recordings
- Members: Kramer, Xan Tyler, (Bongwater, Shimmy Disc)

Let It Come Down is an American avant-garde art rock band composed of Kramer (founder of Shimmy-Disc) and Xan Tyler on the newly relaunched Shimmy-Disc label, in partnership with Joyful Noise Recordings.

== History ==
On April 29 2020, Joyful Noise Recordings named Kramer their 2020 Artist-In-Residence, simultaneously announcing a new partnership with Kramer for the rebirth of his Shimmy-Disc label. The first releases by the newly revived label were to be 3 singles recorded with Xan Tyler under project-name Let It Come Down. The release of this triptych was shortly followed by the duo's debut LP, entitled Songs We Sang In Our Dreams.
