= The 20th Anniversary of the Summer of Love 1987–1967 =

Compilation album by Various artists
- Released: 1987
- Recorded: 1985–1987
- Studio: Noise New York (New York City, NY)
- Genre: Experimental rock
- Length: 67:09
- Label: Shimmy Disc
- Producer: Kramer

Professional ratings
Review scores
Source	Rating
Allmusic	3/5 stars

The 20th Anniversary of the Summer of Love 1987–1967 is a compilation album by various artists, released in 1987 by Shimmy Disc.

== Track listing ==
Side A
No.	Title	Writer(s)	Artist	Length
1.	"Should I Tell Her?"	Jad Fair	Half Japanese	1:57
2.	"True Love"	Fred Frith	Fred Frith	2:57
3.	"Nobody's Place"	Eugene Chadbourne, Mark Kramer, David Licht	Shockabilly	3:29
4.	"Collide, Collide"	Kenny Brown, Mike Edison, Clay Gomez, Tonia Ostrow	Sharky's Machine	3:26
5.	"Two Car Garage"	Mike Berger, Roy Edroso, Andy Mandel, Ron Papka, Brendan Tween	The Shaved Pigs	1:49
6.	"Birth"	Mark Kramer	The Moon	3:03
7.	"(excerpt from) Jane Gone"	Rob Kennedy	Workdogs	2:27
8.	"Backbreaker"	Mark Ashwill, Chris Egan, Peter Missing, Adam Nodelman	Missing Foundation	2:11
9.	"Vegetable Rights"	Mykel Board, Steve Dansiger, Otto Kentrol, Gavin McNett	Artless	3:12
10.	"My Revolution"	Mike Sappol	Krackhouse	1:42

Side B
No.	Title	Writer(s)	Artist	Length
1.	"His New Look"	Mark Kramer, Ann Magnuson	Bongwater	2:19
2.	"Mother"	Tuli Kupferberg	Tuli Kupferberg	1:22
3.	"Telephone"	Ralph Carney, Daved Hild, Mark Kramer	Carney • Hild • Kramer	1:26
4.	"The Letter"	Rick Brown, Sue Garner, Dave Sutter	Fish and the Roses	2:03
5.	"I Sleep"	Chris Cochrane, Zeena Parkins	No Safety	1:45
6.	"Healing Hands"	David Greenberger, Phil Kaplan	Men & Volts	3:36
7.	"Chunk LBJ"	Samm Bennett, David Licht	Samm and Dave	1:57
8.	"Love or Confusion" (Jimi Hendrix Experience cover)	Jimi Hendrix	Spongehead	2:37
9.	"Dear M."	Allen Ginsberg, Steve Taylor	Steve Taylor and Allen Ginsberg	4:13
10.	"I Remember it All"	George Cartwright	George Cartwright	1:38
11.	"I Pledge Allegiance to You"	Scott Williams	Scott Williams	2:46
12.	"She's Working Days, I'm Working Nights"	Bill Ylitalo	Otto Kentrol	2:02
13.	"(excerpt from) Bring Forth"	Edward Larry Gordon	Laraaji	13:12

CD edition track listing
No.	Title	Writer(s)	Artist	Length
1.	"Should I Tell Her?"	Jad Fair	Half Japanese	1:57
2.	"True Love"	Fred Frith	Fred Frith	2:57
3.	"Nobody's Place"	Eugene Chadbourne, Mark Kramer, David Licht	Shockabilly	3:29
4.	"Collide, Collide"	Kenny Brown, Mike Edison, Clay Gomez, Tonia Ostrow	Sharky's Machine	3:26
5.	"Two Car Garage"	Mike Berger, Roy Edroso, Andy Mandel, Ron Papka, Brendan Tween	The Shaved Pigs	1:49
6.	"Birth"	Mark Kramer	The Moon	3:03
7.	"(excerpt from) Jane Gone"	Rob Kennedy	Workdogs	2:27
8.	"Backbreaker"	Mark Ashwill, Chris Egan, Peter Missing, Adam Nodelman	Missing Foundation	2:11
9.	"Fluting on the Hump"	John S. Hall	King Missile	2:26
10.	"Vegetable Rights"	Mykel Board, Steve Dansiger, Otto Kentrol, Gavin McNett	Artless	3:12
11.	"My Revolution"	Mike Sappol	Krackhouse	1:42
12.	"His New Look"	Mark Kramer, Ann Magnuson	Bongwater	2:19
13.	"Mother"	Tuli Kupferberg	Tuli Kupferberg	1:22
14.	"Telephone"	Ralph Carney, Daved Hild, Mark Kramer	Carney • Hild • Kramer	1:26
15.	"The Letter"	Rick Brown, Sue Garner, Dave Sutter	Fish and the Roses	2:03
16.	"I Sleep"	Chris Cochrane, Zeena Parkins	No Safety	1:45
17.	"Healing Hands"	David Greenberger, Phil Kaplan	Men & Volts	3:36
18.	"Chunk LBJ"	Samm Bennett, David Licht	Samm and Dave	1:57
19.	"Love or Confusion" (Jimi Hendrix Experience cover)	Jimi Hendrix	The Spongehead Experience	2:37
20.	"Dear M."	Allen Ginsberg, Steve Taylor	Steve Taylor and Allen Ginsberg	4:13
21.	"I Remember it All"	George Cartwright	George Cartwright	1:38
22.	"I Pledge Allegiance to You"	Scott Williams	Scott Williams	2:46
23.	"She's Working Days, I'm Working Nights"	Bill Ylitalo	Otto Kentrol	2:02
24.	"(excerpt from) Bring Forth"	Edward Larry Gordon	Laraaji	13:12

== Personnel ==
Adapted from The 20th Anniversary of the Summer of Love 1987–1967 liner notes.

- Fred Frith – production (A2)
- Kramer – production, engineering
- Juan Maciel – production (B11)
- Chris Nelson – production (B4)

== Release history ==
Region	Date	Label	Format	Catalog
United States	1987	Shimmy Disc	CD, CS, LP	shimmy 001
Netherlands	1990	Shimmy Disc	CD, LP	SDE 9024
