= Still Alive in '95 (Live in Japan) =

Live album by Kramer
- Released: February 1996
- Recorded: September 25, 1995
- Studio: Guilty, Tokyo (Tokyo, Japan)
- Genre: Experimental rock
- Length: 57:32
- Label: Creativeman Disc.

Kramer chronology
Gunsmoke (1996)	Still Alive in '95 (Live in Japan) (1996)	Tattoo of Blood (1996)

Still Alive in '95 (Live in Japan) is a live album by Kramer, released in February 1996 by Creativeman Disc.

== Track listing ==
All tracks are written by Mark Kramer, except where noted.

No.	Title	Writer(s)	Length
1.	"Still Alive"		2:07
2.	"In Dreams" (Roy Orbison cover)	Roy Orbison	3:15
3.	"Wicked Game" (Chris Isaak cover)	Chris Isaak	5:23
4.	"Nine Minus Seven Is Two"		4:12
5.	"The Secret of Suicide"		3:40
6.	"Stupid Summer"		2:57
7.	"Hello Music"		3:08
8.	"Welcome Home"		5:09
9.	"I'm Your Fan"		2:41
10.	"One So Black"	Dogbowl	3:56
11.	"Jealous Guy" (John Lennon cover)	John Lennon	4:20
12.	"I've Seen the End"		5:17
13.	"The Tracks of My Tears" (The Miracles cover)	Smokey Robinson	4:01
14.	"You Don't Know"		2:41
15.	"Too Much Sleep"		2:34
16.	"The Big Sell-Out"		2:11

== Personnel ==
Adapted from Still Alive in '95 (Live in Japan) liner notes.

Musicians

- Dogbowl – vocals, acoustic guitar
- Hugh Hopper – bass guitar
- Kramer – vocals, acoustic guitar, flute, mixing, mastering
- Damon Krukowski – drums
- Steve Watson – electric guitar

Production and additional personnel

- Alan Douches – mastering
- Hiroaki Doi – art direction, design
- Yoshiaki Kondo – recording, mixing
- Michael Macioce – photography

== Release history ==
Region	Date	Label	Format	Catalog
Japan	1996	Creativeman Disc.	CD	CMDD-00021
