= Captain Howdy =

Captain Howdy may refer to:

- Pazuzu (The Exorcist), named "Captain Howdy" during the early stages of demonic possession
- Captain Howdy (band), a 1990s alternative rock band
- "Captain Howdy", a song by Twisted Sister from the album Stay Hungry and covered by many metal bands.
- Captain Howdy, a character in the film Strangeland, based on the song by Twisted Sister and starring Twisted Sister frontman Dee Snider
- Captain Howdy, a character in the 1983 film Hysterical
