= (Why Are We) Trapped? =

Single by King Missile

from the album Happy Hour
- Released: 1993
- Genre: Avant-garde, psychedelic rock
- Length: 4:30 (album version); 3:13 (radio/video edit)
- Label: Atlantic
- Songwriter(s): John S. Hall, Roger Murdock, Dave Rick, Chris Xefos
- Producer(s): Kramer, Steve Watson, King Missile

King Missile singles chronology
"Detachable Penis" (1992)	"(Why Are We) Trapped?" (1993)	"Martin Scorsese" (1993)

"(Why Are We) Trapped?" is a song by avant-garde band King Missile. It was the second single from the band's 1992 album Happy Hour.

== Content ==
In "(Why Are We) Trapped?," a psychedelic rock track with prominent lead guitar, frontman John S. Hall sings variants of the question, "Why are we trapped here in the dark so long?" to an unidentified captor. In the chorus, he insists, "We've done everything you told us to do," and demands, "Let us out."

== Music video ==
The video for the edited version of "(Why Are We) Trapped?" was directed by George Seminara. In the video, the band plays while "trapped" in a dark, gloomy pit.
