= Egomaniacs (album) =

1993 studio album by Fahy, Harley, Kramer

Studio album by Fahy • Harley • Kramer
- Released: 1993
- Recorded: Noise New Jersey; Jersey City, New Jersey
- Genre: Experimental rock
- Length: 36:45
- Label: Shimmy Disc
- Producer: Kramer

Kramer chronology
Who's Afraid? (1992)	Egomaniacs (1993)	The Secret of Comedy (1994)

Professional ratings
Review scores
Source	Rating
AllMusic	4/5 stars

Egomaniacs is a studio album by Kim Fahy, Jamie Harley and Kramer, released in 1993 by Shimmy Disc.

== Track listing ==
All tracks are written by Kim Fahy, Jamie Harley and Kramer.

No.	Title	Length
1.	"Cancerman"	2:32
2.	"I Am Rolling"	2:34
3.	"Your Sister"	3:11
4.	"That Letter"	1:27
5.	"Heavenly Bent"	3:39
6.	"Father's Day"	1:59
7.	"From Nebraska"	2:14
8.	"Redline"	3:16
9.	"Mamma's Collection"	3:00
10.	"Your Lips Are Nuggets"	2:38
11.	"Indeed, This Is the Creep"	2:19
12.	"The Raven"	2:50
13.	"The Pebbles"	2:44
14.	"Kiss Your Wallet"	3:45

== Personnel ==
Adapted from Egomaniacs liner notes.

Musicians

- Kim Fahy – vocals, guitar
- Jamie Harley – drums, percussion, engineering
- Kramer – vocals, bass guitar, Hammond organ, production, mixing

Production and additional personnel

- DAM – design
- Michael Macioce – photography
- Ron Paul – assistant engineer

== Release history ==
Region	Date	Label	Format	Catalog
United States	1993	Shimmy Disc	CD, LP	shimmy 068
