= Reasons in the Sun =

Studio album by Glen or Glenda
- Released: April 21, 1998
- Recorded: 1997
- Studios: Noise New Jersey (Jersey City, NJ)
- Genre: Experimental rock
- Length: 60:21
- Label: Shimmy Disc
- Producer: Kramer

Kramer chronology
Money Feeds My Music Machine (1998)	Reasons in the Sun (1998)	The Sound of Music (1999)

Reasons in the Sun is the first and only studio album by Glen or Glenda. It was released in 1998 by Shimmy Disc. It is a collaboration between musician and producer Kramer and vocalist Tammy Lang.

== Track listing ==
All tracks are written by Kramer and Tammy Lang, except where noted.

No.	Title	Writer(s)	Length
1.	"Dorothy"		3:39
2.	"Reason"		2:49
3.	"Suzanne" (Leonard Cohen cover)	Leonard Cohen	3:15
4.	"Asphodel"		4:13
5.	"Fair Verona"		4:26
6.	"Dizzy" (Tommy Roe cover)	Tommy Roe, Freddy Weller	4:18
7.	"Daphne"		2:48
8.	"Needles and Pins" (The Searchers cover)	Sonny Bono, Jack Nitzsche	3:35
9.	"I Love You Anyway"		1:57
10.	"My Bubblegum Is Pink"		3:31
11.	"William's Cotton Ride"		3:10
12.	"When Joey Gets Eyes"		3:54
13.	"Insatiable Sue"		4:05
14.	"I'm No Angel"		2:54
15.	"The Eunuchorn"		2:39
16.	"The Shepard"		3:27
17.	"The Ring Cycle"		5:41

== Personnel ==
Adapted from Reasons in the Sun liner notes.

Glen or Glenda

- Kramer – vocals, guitars, bass guitar, keyboards, flute, tape, percussion, production, engineering
- Tammy Lang – vocals, tambourine

Additional musicians

- Deni Bonet – violin, viola (4, 5, 10, 12, 16, 17)
- David Licht – drums, percussion (1, 12)
- Billy Ficca – drums (11)
- Tess Mattisson – backing vocals (14)
- Mark McCarron – guitar (8, 9, 11, 14, 16, 17)

Production and design

- Alan Douches – mastering
- Jad Fair – cover art
- Macioce – photography

== Release history ==
Region	Date	Label	Format	Catalog
United States	1998	Shimmy Disc	CD	SHM-5136
