= Oranj Symphonette =

The Oranj Symphonette is an experimental jazz-rock quintet from San Francisco, USA, formed from members of Tom Waits' band. They have released two albums.

== Formation ==
The band was formed by musicians who played for Tom Waits. They recorded two albums, the first cover versions of Henry Mancini.

Led by cellist/bassist Matt Brubeck (son of Dave Brubeck), the group includes Joe Gore and multi-instrumentalist Ralph Carney. Individually these three have played with PJ Harvey, the B-52's, Marc Ribot, and others. They met while recording Waits' score for the Jim Jarmusch film Night On Earth. In 1993, they began on their Mancini cover album. Joined by Scott Amendola, they debuted at San Francisco's Radio Valencia in 1994. In 1996, they added Hammond organ/accordion player Rob Burger and Pat Campbell replaced Amendola on drums for an album of music by composers including Mancini, Quincy Jones, Elmer Bernstein, Duke Ellington, Marvin Hamlisch, Burt Bacharach, Jimmy Webb, and John Barry.

== Debut album ==
Their Gramavision/Rykodisc debut, Oranj Symphonette Plays Mancini, reinterprets the work of one of Hollywood's most memorable composers, Henry Mancini.

== Discography ==
- Oranj Symphonette Plays Mancini (1996)
- The Oranj Album (1998)
