= Rubber Hair =

Studio album by Kramer and Daved Hild
- Released: March 1997
- Recorded: 1996
- Studio: Noise New Jersey (Demarest, New Jersey, NJ)
- Genre: Experimental rock
- Length: 41:44
- Label: Shimmy Disc
- Producer: Kramer

Kramer chronology
Hit Men (1996)	Rubber Hair (1997)	Huge (1997)

Professional ratings
Review scores
Source	Rating
Allmusic	2.5/5 stars

Rubber Hair is a studio album by Kramer and Daved Hild, released in March 1997 by Shimmy Disc. It included contributions by cellist Garo Yellin and actor Billy West, who played guitar on "Photograph" and "Rubber Hair".

== Track listing ==
All lyrics are written by Daved Hild; all music is composed by Mark Kramer.

No.	Title	Length
1.	"Photograph"	4:06
2.	"The Cat in the Window"	3:23
3.	"Masonic Hardware"	3:59
4.	"The Veronica Building"	2:46
5.	"Bargains Night Bargains"	3:37
6.	"Cold Air"	4:11
7.	"Vegetables Do"	2:10
8.	"Mr. Ryder on the Beach"	3:26
9.	"X Is the Sign"	2:53
10.	"Distress in the Dixie Girls"	4:42
11.	"The Ballad of Veal"	3:37
12.	"Rubber Hair"	3:54

== Personnel ==
Adapted from Rubber Hair liner notes.

- Daved Hild – vocals, drums, cover art
- Kramer – instruments, production, engineering
- Garo Yellin – cello
- Billy West – guitar (1, 12)

== Release history ==
Region	Date	Label	Format	Catalog
United States	1997	Shimmy Disc	CD	shimmy 087
