= The Sound of Music (An Unfinished Symphony in 12 Parts) =

Studio album by Jad Fair and Kramer
- Released: April 20, 1999
- Genre: Experimental rock
- Length: 49:01
- Label: Shimmy Disc
- Producer: Kramer

Jad Fair chronology
I Like Your Face (1999)	The Sound of Music (An Unfinished Symphony in 12 Parts) (1999)	The Lucky Sperms: Somewhat Humorous (2001)

Kramer chronology
Reasons in the Sun (1998)	The Sound of Music (1999)	The Greenberg Variations (2003)

Professional ratings
Review scores
Source	Rating
AllMusic	3/5 stars
Robert Christgau	(1-star Honorable Mention)
Pitchfork	3.7/10

The Sound of Music (An Unfinished Symphony in 12 Parts) is a studio album by Jad Fair and Kramer. It was released in 1999 through Shimmy Disc.

== Critical reception ==
SF Weekly wrote that "ace musician Kramer offers a particularly sweet backdrop for Jad's zany lyrics."

== Track listing ==
No.	Title	Writer(s)	Length
1.	"Beverly"	Jad Fair, Mark Kramer	3:05
2.	"Candace"	Jad Fair, Mark Kramer	2:26
3.	"Elenor"	Jad Fair, Mark Kramer	3:01
4.	"The Faceless Man"	Jad Fair, Mark Kramer	3:48
5.	"Our Cause to Worry"	Jad Fair, Mark Kramer	4:47
6.	"Here Comes Roxanne"	Jad Fair, Mark Kramer	3:54
7.	"Zorro's Black Whip"	Jad Fair, Mark Kramer	3:40
8.	"Sleeping Beauty"	Jad Fair, Mark Kramer	3:41
9.	"Pretty Angel Eyes"	Jad Fair, Mark Kramer	5:07
10.	"Something to Sing About"	Jad Fair, Mark Kramer	1:58
11.	"Annie Oakley"	Jad Fair, Mark Kramer	5:18
12.	"The Sound of Music"	Jad Fair, Mark Kramer	8:16

== Personnel ==
Adapted from The Sound of Music (An Unfinished Symphony in 12 Parts) liner notes.

- Jad Fair – vocals, instruments
- Kramer – instruments, production, engineering

== Release history ==
Region	Date	Label	Format	Catalog
United States	1999	Shimmy Disc	CD	SHM-5095
