= Xan Tyler =

British pop singer

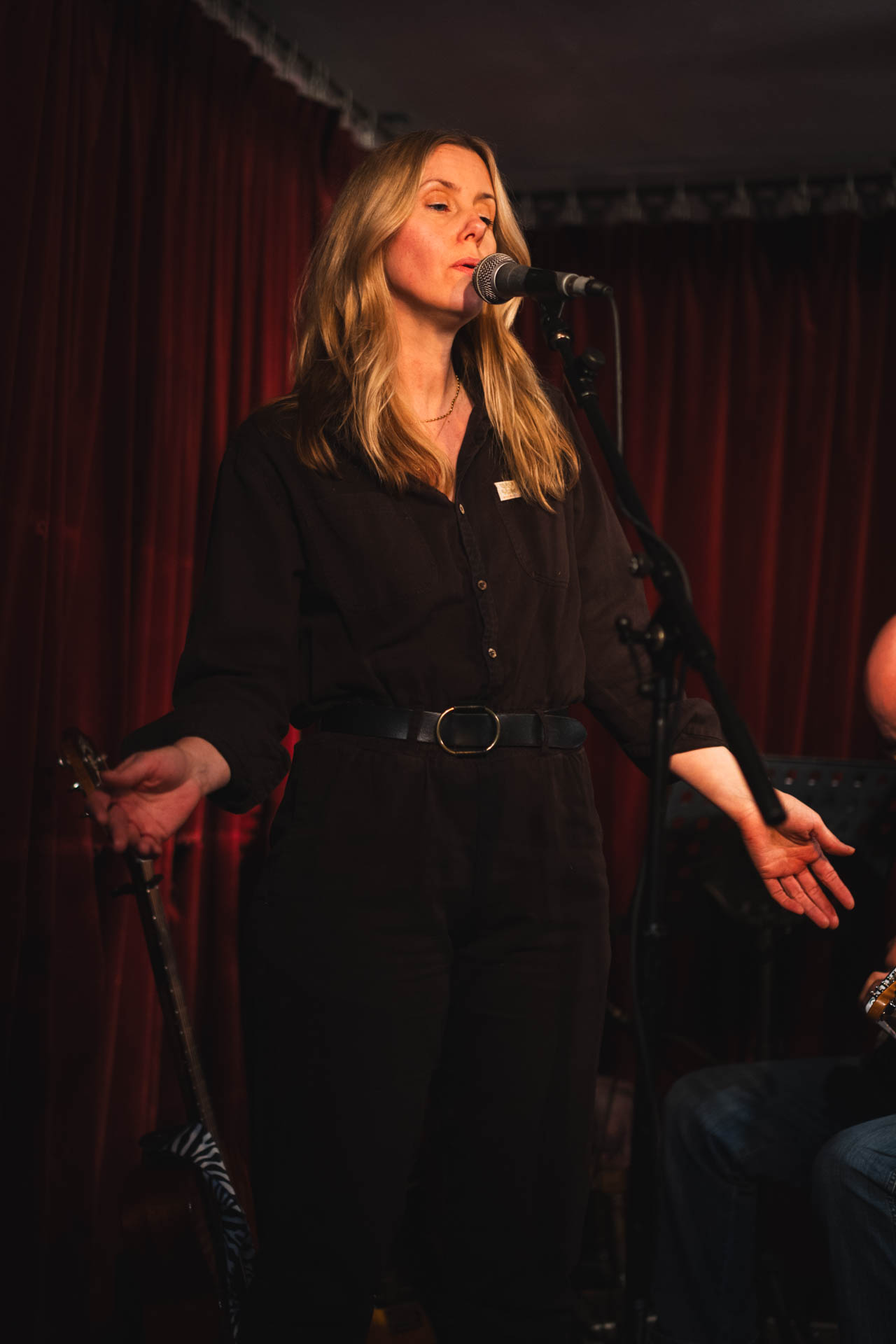
- Xan Tyler in 2025

Background information
- Born: Xanthe Tyler
- Origin: London, England
- Genres: Dream pop, electronic, alternative rock, folk, alt-folk, dub, ska, trip hop
- Instruments: Vocals, guitar
- Years active: 1995–present
- Labels: Creation Records (1998-1999); Poptones (1999-2000); Positiva (2000-2002); Joyful Noise Recordings (2020); Shimmy Disc (2020); Ariwa (2021); Last Night From Glasgow (2023)
- Website: http://www.xantyler.com/

Xan Tyler is a British singer-songwriter based in Scotland.

== Career ==
Born and raised in South London, Tyler began her singing career as a backing singer. After working with numerous bands and as a session singer, she signed to Alan McGee's Creation Records as one half of synth pop duo Technique (the other half being musician Kate Holmes, now of Client).

In 1999, Tyler and Kate Holmes collaborated with Mad Professor to create Mission Control. Mission Control released one album, Dub Showcase on Poptones and Tyler joined Mad Professor on a European tour in 2000. Dub Showcase also featured a vocal from Lee "Scratch" Perry.

1999 also saw Tyler's first success as Technique with the release of "Sun is Shining", released on Creation Records, which reached number 64 in the UK Singles Chart in April of that year, followed by "You & Me" which got to number 56 in August. One of the remixers on "Sun is Shining" was trance DJ Matt Darey, for whom she later performed vocals on the track "Wanna be an Angel", released under the name of Tekara in 2004 on Platipus Records.

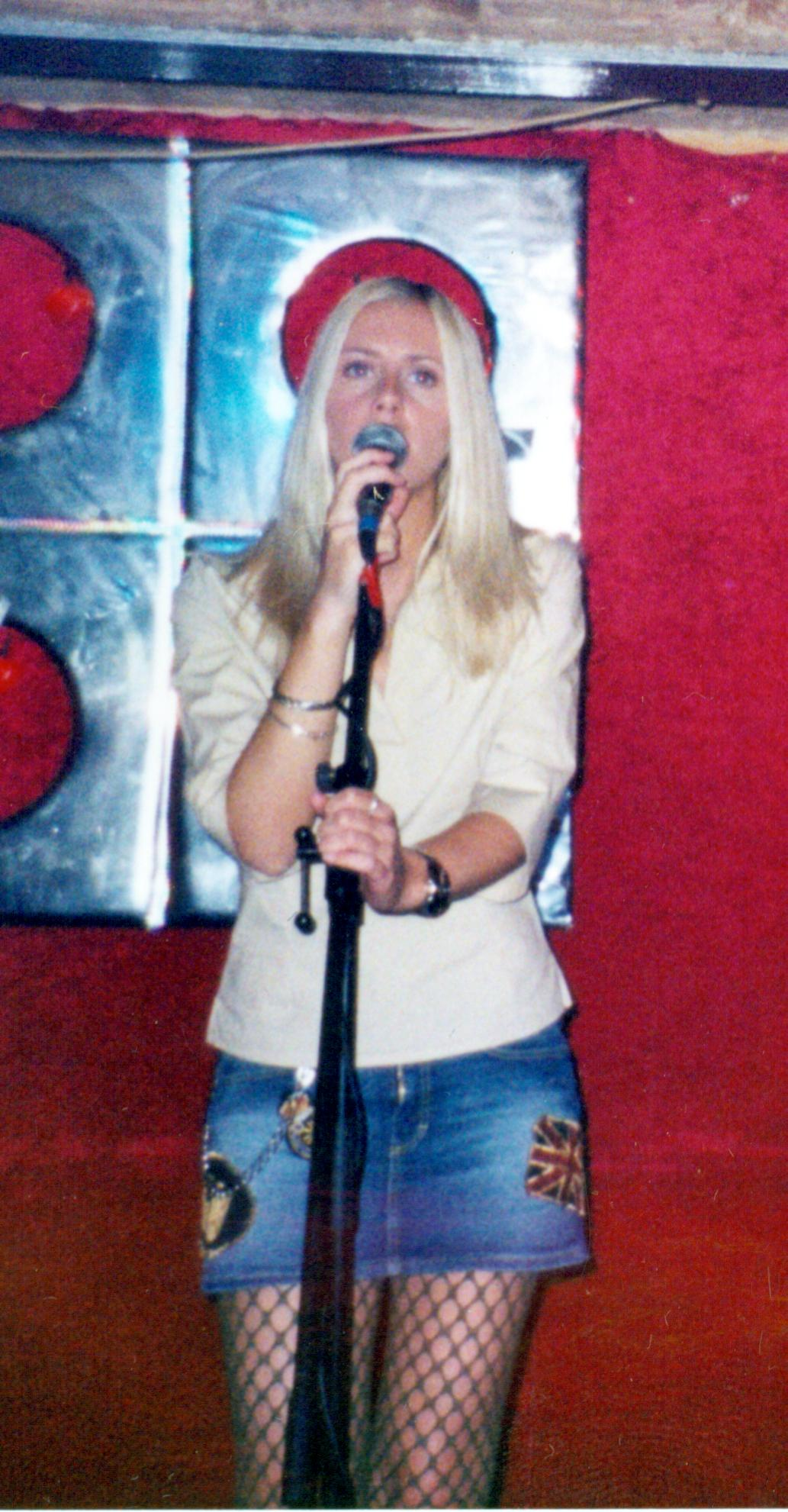
Tyler performing in Japan in 2001

In 2001, she teamed up with dance music producer Timo Maas and as Orinoko they released "Island" on Positiva Records. Tyler worked with the pop ska band The Joys of Sound, and produced a number of tracks. In 2020 their song "Too Much Is Never Enough" was placed in a Campervan Co. advert for Sky TV.

On 23 June 2011 it was announced that Tyler was joining Client to take over live lead vocals. In 2014, Tyler started work on her solo EP with London-based producer Stuart Crossland. The "Into the Blue" EP was released on 8 December 2014. In 2015, Tyler collaborated with producer Kramer in Scotland on three new tracks, written by Tyler. The resulting three track single was released in 2016.

In 2017, Tyler provided backing vocals for the album Songs My Ruined Gave To Me by folk artists, Naomi Bedford and Paul Simmonds. Tyler sang on five songs on the album. One of which, "I Hate You", featured Andy Summers on guitar.

In April 2020, Joyful Noise Recordings named Kramer their 2020 Artist-In-Residence, and simultaneously announced a new partnership with Kramer for the rebirth of his Shimmy Disc label. Tyler is Kramer's sole collaborator on "Let It Come Down". Their debut LP Songs We Sang In Our Dreams was released on 12 June 2020.

Tyler released Clarion Call an album with Mad Professor on Ariwa, in July 2021. The album received favourable reviews including Uncut Magazine who described it as 'delicious' and 'extraordinary'.

In 2023, Tyler signed to the Last Night From Glasgow label and released the first single from her solo album, funded by Creative Scotland and produced by Boo Hewerdine. The single features a guest vocal from The Delgados' singer Emma Pollock.

"Holding Up Half The Sky", Tyler's debut solo album was released on Last Night From Glasgow on 24th May 2024 in Glasgow. It entered the Official Scottish Albums Chart at No.4, the UK Vinyl Chart at No.10 and the Independent Albums Chart at No.12 the following week. Each of the twelve songs on the album tell a woman's story. One of the songs was inspired by Molly Drake who was Nick Drake's unsung mother. Molly and Nick's music was not well known on their lifetimes. The song tells of the sadness of a dead man's mother.

Xan Tyler teamed up with Amsterdam based Texan Jonathan Brown aka Dusty Stray in 2025. The pair released their debut collaboration "Home" and tours followed. "Home" reached number 8 in the Official Scottish Albums chart and number 5 in the Independent Album Breakers Chart.

== Reviews ==
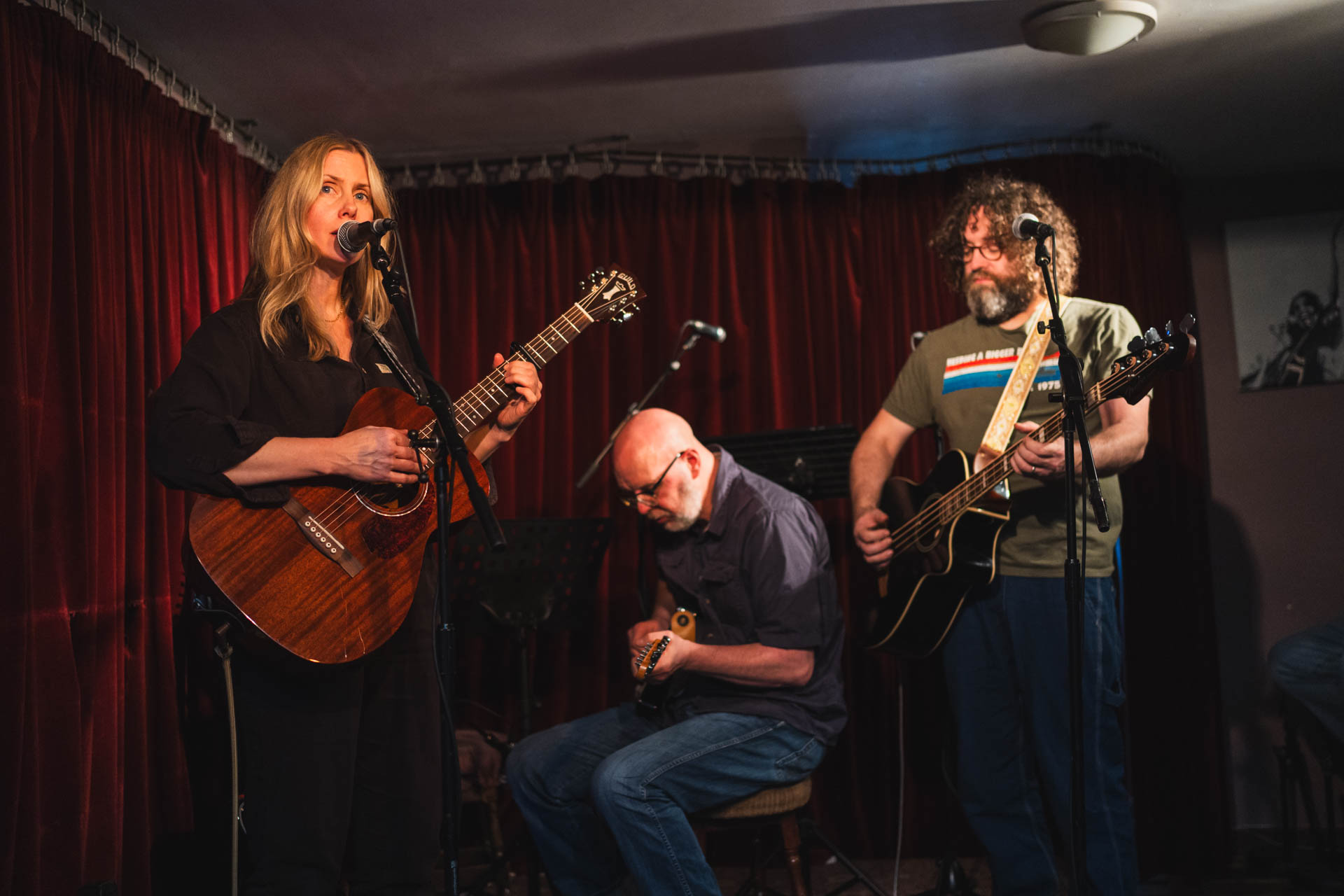
Tyler performing in 2025

September 2009decbelblog.com "Tyler offers something different for us all. Think of a mix between Fiona Apple and Alicia Keys."

December 2014 from unappreciatedscholars.com: 'Into the Blue has been a wonderful end-of-year discovery. Electro-acoustic in all its glory with a great vocal performance. Another wonderful infectious work that sticks around in the brain for a long time post-listen.'

In January 2015, Undercover Rock Life reviewed Into The Blue, describing it as a six-track EP that explores electro-acoustic music. The review highlighted the track If as a notable example of electro-ambient composition and suggested that the EP indicated potential for future artistic development.

June 2020 'On Songs We Sang in Our Dreams, boyish humor blooms into something mature and feminine, thanks largely to the band’s crystalline vocalist, British singer Xan Tyler.' PITCHFORK.

June 2020 'the voice of Xan Tyler restores prestige to one of the most important indie producers of the 80s and 90s.' HYPFI.IT

June 2020 '"Vicky" tackles unnerving intimacy and internalized emotional conflict with multi-dimensional composition and fearless grace.' Earmilk

June 2021 ‘…….tough lyrics, soft sounds….. 4* The Scotsman

September issue 2021 ‘……..delicious…..extraordinary…….’ 7/10 UNCUT Magazine

July 2021 "probably the most wonderful album I've heard this year" Boogaloo Radio
