= Hit Men =

Studio album by Daevid Allen and Kramer
- Released: April 30, 1996
- Recorded: 1994 – 1995
- Studio: Noise New Jersey (Jersey City, N.J.)
- Genre: Progressive rock
- Length: 41:16
- Label: Shimmy Disc
- Producer: Kramer

Daevid Allen chronology
Dreamin' a Dream (1995)	Hit Men (1996)	Divided Alien Clockwork Band (1997)

Kramer chronology
Tattoo of Blood (1996)	Hit Men (1996)	Rubber Hair (1997)

Hit Men is a studio album by Daevid Allen and Kramer joined by drummer Bill Bacon, released on April 30, 1996, by Shimmy Disc. The three musicians had previously performed together as part of New York Gong in 1978–79, producing the album About Time.

== Track listing ==
No.	Title	Writer(s)	Length
1.	"Tokyo Freedom Blues"	Daevid Allen, Mark Kramer	2:47
2.	"The Punter from Purgatory"	Daevid Allen, Mark Kramer	3:19
3.	"Oh, My Poor Brother"	Daevid Allen	4:29
4.	"Too Much Noise"	Kramer	1:51
5.	"She's a Real Man"	Daevid Allen	5:28
6.	"On a Carpet of Foolscap"	Daevid Allen	5:32
7.	"39 and Holding Brothers"	Daevid Allen	3:41
8.	"The Death of Dr. Tim"	Mark Kramer	1:44
9.	"The Face"	Daevid Allen, Mark Kramer	7:17
10.	"The Life of Othello"	Mark Kramer	5:08

== Personnel ==
Adapted from Hit Men liner notes.

Musicians

- Daevid Allen – vocals, guitar, acoustic guitar, assistant engineer
- Bill Bacon – drums, percussion
- Kramer – vocals, guitar, bass guitar, organ, sampler, tape, production, engineering

Production and additional personnel

- Jed Rothenberg – assistant engineer

== Release history ==
Region	Date	Label	Format	Catalog
United States	1996	Shimmy Disc	CD	shimmy 080
