= Huge (album) =

Studio album by Hugh Hopper & Kramer
- Released: June 17, 1997
- Recorded: September 1995 – April 16, 1996
- Studio: Noise New Jersey (Jersey City)
- Genre: Progressive rock
- Length: 38:57
- Label: Knitting Factory/Shimmy Disc
- Producer: Kramer

Hugh Hopper chronology
Elephants In Your Head (1996)	Huge (1997)	Highspot Paradox (1997)

Kramer chronology
Rubber Hair (1997)	Huge (1997)	Let Me Explain Something to You About Art (1998)

Professional ratings
Review scores
Source	Rating
Allmusic	3/5 stars

Huge is a studio album by Hugh Hopper and Kramer, released on June 17, 1997, by Shimmy Disc and Knitting Factory Records.

== Track listing ==
All tracks are written by Hugh Hopper and Mark Kramer.

No.	Title	Length
1.	"Hugh"	4:33
2.	"Ten Mile Mean Streak"	3:52
3.	"Tall as the Empire State"	4:10
4.	"Manchester '96"	2:35
5.	"Waltz of the Big Brains"	3:17
6.	"She's Everything Mr. H."	4:17
7.	"Einstein & Hawking"	3:38
8.	"Celine's Final Breath"	4:51
9.	"Texas Is Huge"	1:24
10.	"Terry Southern Blues"	6:20

UK CD track listing
No.	Title	Length
1.	"Hugh"	4:34
2.	"Ten Mile Mean Streak"	3:51
3.	"Tall as the Empire State"	4:10
4.	"Manchester '96"	2:35
5.	"Waltz of the Big Brains"	3:17
6.	"She's Everything Mr. H."	4:17
7.	"Einstein & Hawking"	3:38
8.	"Celine's Final Breath"	4:49
9.	"Only Being"	6:55
10.	"Texas Trombone"	1:24
11.	"Terry Southern Blues"	6:16

== Personnel ==
Adapted from Huge liner notes.

Musicians

- Hugh Hopper – bass guitar, piano
- Kramer – guitar, piano, organ, tape, production, mastering, engineering
- Damon Krukowski – drums, percussion

Additional musicians

- Micaël Gidon – vocals and guitar ("Only Being")
- Robert Jarvis – trombone (9)

Production and additional personnel

- Alan Douches – mastering
- Yalitza Ferreras – design
- Michael Macioce – photography
- Steve Watson – assistant producer, assistant engineer

== Release history ==
Region	Date	Label	Format	Catalog
United States	1998	Knitting Factory	CD	KFW 088
United States	1998	Shimmy Disc	CD	shimmy 088
