= Interior of an Edifice Under the Sea =

Studio album by Pan American
- Released: June 27, 2025
- Genre: Ambient
- Length: 47:01
- Label: Shimmy-Disc
- Producer: Kramer

Pan American chronology
New World, Lonely Ride (2025)	Interior of an Edifice Under the Sea (2025)

Interior of an Edifice Under the Sea is the twelfth studio album by American experimental electronic music ensemble Pan American. It is also a collaborative project with American musician Kramer. It was released on June 27, 2025, via Shimmy-Disc in LP, CD and digital formats.

== Reception ==
Professional ratings
Review scores
Source	Rating
AllMusic	3.5/5 stars
Pitchfork	6.5/10
Spill	4.5/5 stars

The album received a rating of 4.5 from Spill, whose reviewer noted, it is "nothing less that excellent set of what we might see if we dive deep underwater transformed into musical visions, with all its lights, darkness, and unexpected elements that might wait for us down there."

In a 3.5-star review for AllMusic, Paul Simpson remarked, "The album never rises to the surface, preferring to dwell deep beneath, but it finds its peace through patient, concentrated isolation."

Pitchfork's Daniel Bromfield assigned the album a rating of 6.5, stating "Edifice falls short, often falling into patterns of what ambient music is supposed to sound like rather than poking at what it can sound like."

== Track listing ==
Interior of an Edifice Under the Sea track listing
No.	Title	Length
1.	"In the Time It Takes to Drown"	6:45
2.	"John the Baptist Was a Creature of Habit"	7:40
3.	"Under the Mariana Trench"	3:35
4.	"The Double Life of a Seahorse"	5:25
5.	"Lamenting the Colours of Melting Ice"	4:27
6.	"If a River Runs Through It"	7:09
7.	"Clouds Over the Rain in Spain"	6:05
8.	"Blind to the Last of Its Kind"	5:55
Total length:		47:01
