= Black Power (album) =

Studio album by Ralph Carney, Daved Hild and Kramer
- Released: 1994
- Recorded: 1993–1994
- Studio: Noise New Jersey; Demarest, New Jersey
- Genre: Experimental rock
- Length: 37:59
- Label: Shimmy Disc
- Producer: Kramer

Ralph Carney chronology
| Happiness Finally Came to Them (1987) | Black Power (1994) | Ralph Sounds (1997) |

Kramer chronology
| A Remark Hugh Made (1994) | Black Power (1994) | Music for Crying (1995) |

Professional ratings
Review scores
| Source | Rating |
|---|---|
| AllMusic | 1.5/5 stars |

Black Power is a studio album by Ralph Carney, Daved Hild and Kramer, released in 1994 by Shimmy Disc. Along with newly recorded work, the album also contains selected tracks from their previous effort Happiness Finally Came to Them.

== Track listing ==
All tracks are written by Ralph Carney, Daved Hild and Kramer, except where noted.

| No. | Title | Writer(s) | Length |
|---|---|---|---|
| 1. | "Tears Come Down" | | 2:27 |
| 2. | "Speed Shooting" | | 4:23 |
| 3. | "Speaker of the House" | | 6:06 |
| 4. | "Sweetheart" | | 3:42 |
| 5. | "Wish" | | 1:12 |
| 6. | "Infrared Asylum Green" | | 3:34 |
| 7. | "The Ballad of Soap" | | 2:19 |
| 8. | "These Foolish Things" | Eric Maschwitz, Jack Strachey | 3:59 |
| 9. | "The Ballad of Jim Jones" | | 2:19 |
| 10. | "Thanks for the Tinklers" | | 1:13 |
| 11. | "The Ballad of Florida" | | 2:52 |
| 12. | "Dangerous Cult Following" | | 3:47 |

CD bonus tracks
| No. | Title | Writer(s) | Length |
|---|---|---|---|
| 13. | "Hands" | | 2:29 |
| 14. | "Telephone" | | 1:27 |
| 15. | "Clown" | | 3:34 |
| 16. | "Nothing" | | 3:03 |
| 17. | "Slowly" | | 2:32 |
| 18. | "Wanda" | | 1:49 |
| 19. | "Larry" | | 2:57 |
| 20. | "Name" | Lennon–McCartney | 5:01 |
| 21. | "Turkeyfaced" | | 1:58 |
| 22. | "Javalena" | | 2:15 |
| 23. | "End" | | 2:34 |

== Personnel ==
Adapted from Black Power liner notes.

Musicians

- Ralph Carney – saxophones, guitars, vocals
- Daved Hild – vocals, cover art
- Kramer – bass guitar, piano, mellotron, Hammond organ, tape, backing vocals, production, engineering

Additional musicians

- Bill Bacon – drums, percussion
- Randolph A. Hudson III – guitar

Production and additional personnel

- DAM – design
- Michael Macioce – photography

== Release history ==
| Region | Date | Label | Format | Catalog |
|---|---|---|---|---|
| United States | 1994 | Shimmy Disc | CD | shimmy 077 |
