= Let Me Explain Something to You About Art =

Studio album by Kramer
- Released: January 20, 1998
- Recorded: 1997
- Studio: Noise New Jersey (Jersey City, NJ)
- Genre: Experimental rock
- Length: 53:27
- Label: Tzadik
- Producer: Kramer

Kramer chronology
Huge (1997)	Let Me Explain Something to You About Art (1998)	Songs from the Pink Death (1998)

Professional ratings
Review scores
Source	Rating
AllMusic	3/5 stars
The Encyclopedia of Popular Music	3/5 stars

Let Me Explain Something to You About Art is a studio album by composer and producer Kramer, released in 1998 by Tzadik Records.

== Production ==
Deni Bonet contributed the accordion and strings; Kramer played everything else.

== Track listing ==
All tracks are written by Mark Kramer.

No.	Title	Length
1.	"Umberto D."	16:06
2.	"Odds Against Tomorrow"	14:31
3.	"Jupiter and the Infinite"	22:50

== Personnel ==
Adapted from Let Me Explain Something to You About Art liner notes.

Musicians

- Deni Bonet – violin, viola, accordion
- Kramer – bass guitar, keyboard, sampler, tape, production, engineering, mastering

Additional personnel

- Herbert Meyer – voice
- Margaret Zwoller – voice

Production

- Michael Macioce – photography
- Ikue Mori – design
- Allan Tucker – mastering
- John Zorn – executive producer

== Release history ==
Region	Date	Label	Format	Catalog
United States	1998	Tzadik	CD	TZ 7119
