= Money Feeds My Music Machine =

Studio album by Captain Howdy
- Released: April 21, 1998
- Recorded: 1995–1997
- Studio: Noise New Jersey (Jersey City, N.J.)
- Genre: Experimental rock, alternative rock
- Length: 39:56
- Label: Knitting Factory/Shimmy Disc
- Producer: Kramer

Captain Howdy chronology
Tattoo of Blood (1996)	Money Feeds My Music Machine (1998)

Kramer chronology
Songs from the Pink Death (1998)	Money Feeds My Music Machine (1998)	Reasons in the Sun (1998)

Professional ratings
Review scores
Source	Rating
Allmusic	3.5/5 stars

Money Feeds My Music Machine is the second studio album by Captain Howdy, released on April 21, 1998, by Shimmy Disc and Knitting Factory Records. It is a collaboration between musician and producer Kramer and magician Penn Jillette.

The album title is a phrase from the song Green Tambourine by The Lemon Pipers.

== Track listing ==
No.	Title	Writer(s)	Length
1.	"Always Something There to Remind Me"	Burt Bacharach, Hal David	3:43
2.	"I Just Don't Wanna Try"	Kramer	4:12
3.	"Old Man"	Neil Young	4:11
4.	"Man Bites Dog"	Kramer	2:22
5.	"If You Love Me, Kill Your Dog"	Penn Jillette, Kramer	3:34
6.	"I Just Wanna Get Laid"	Kramer	3:36
7.	"I Long For Kyoto"	Penn Jillette, Kramer	3:06
8.	"Don't Fuck With the Phoenix"	Penn Jillette, Kramer	2:58
9.	"Shut Up"	Penn Jillette, Kramer	3:19
10.	"Radio's Broke"	Penn Jillette	3:24
11.	"Barry's Lament"	Kramer	5:31

== Personnel ==
Adapted from Money Feeds My Music Machine liner notes.

Captain Howdy

- Penn Jillette – vocals
- Kramer – instruments, vocals, production, engineering

Additional musicians

- Bill Bacon – percussion
- Tess (Kramer's 5-year-old daughter) – vocals (4)
- Billy West – guitar

Production and additional personnel

- Tony Fitzpatrick – cover art
- Jed Rothenberg – assistant engineer
- Steve Watson – assistant engineer

== Release history ==
Region	Date	Label	Format	Catalog
United States	1998	Shimmy Disc	CD	shimmy 091
United States	1998	Knitting Factory	CD	SHM-5135
