= Real Men (album) =

Studio album by John S. Hall & Kramer
- Released: 1991
- Recorded: 1991
- Studio: Noise New York; New York City
- Genre: Experimental rock
- Length: 52:00
- Label: Shimmy Disc
- Producer: Kramer

John S. Hall chronology
Real Men (1991)	The Body Has a Head (1996)

Kramer chronology
Roll Out the Barrel (1988)	Real Men (1991)	The Guilt Trip (1992)

Professional ratings
Review scores
Source	Rating
AllMusic	3/5 stars

Real Men is an album by King Missile frontman John S. Hall and producer/multi-instrumentalist Kramer. It was released in 1991 through Shimmy Disc.

== Track listing ==
The CD track listing on the cover is incorrect. The correct track listing appears below.

All lyrics are written by John S. Hall; all music is composed by Mark Kramer.

No.	Title	Length
1.	"Everybody Screams Inside"	2:15
2.	"Pain & Pleasure"	1:18
3.	"The Party"	2:22
4.	"Columbus Day Weekend"	1:42
5.	"My Personal Life"	2:17
6.	"Francis Bacon"	1:51
7.	"Empty"	1:27
8.	"The Trees"	1:40
9.	"The Absolute"	3:09
10.	"Real Men"	3:44
11.	"Water"	3:49
12.	"Enjoy Your Tea"	1:59
13.	"Things"	2:23
14.	"Clarity Transcending Choice"	1:13
15.	"The Birds"	2:16
16.	"My Life"	1:32
17.	"How Much Longer"	1:22
18.	"Mr. Story"	3:24
19.	"Wind-Up Toys"	1:08
20.	"Knowledge"	1:05
21.	"Garbage Party"	1:39
22.	"The Spanish Armada"	1:12
23.	"Hide the Knives"	5:13
24.	"Shit"	2:00

== Personnel ==
Adapted from Real Men liner notes.

Musicians

- John S. Hall – vocals
- Kramer – instruments, production, engineering

Design

- Dave Larr – art direction
- Michael Macioce – photography

== Release history ==
Region	Date	Label	Format	Catalog
United States	1991	Shimmy Disc	CD, CS, LP	shimmy 042
Netherlands	1991	Shimmy Disc	CD	SDE 9136
