= Happiness Finally Came to Them =

1987 studio album by Carney/Hild/Kramer

Studio album by Ralph Carney/Hild/Kramer
- Released: 1987
- Recorded: 1985–1987
- Studio: Noise New York; New York City
- Genre: Experimental rock
- Length: Vinyl: 42:49; CD: 52:16
- Label: Shimmy Disc
- Producer: Kramer

Ralph Carney chronology
Happiness Finally Came to Them (1987)	Black Power (1994)

Kramer chronology
Happiness Finally Came to Them (1987)	Roll Out the Barrel (1988)

Happiness Finally Came to Them is a studio album by Ralph Carney, Daved Hild and Kramer, released in 1987 through Shimmy Disc. It was the first album to be issued under any of the three musicians' names, serving as both Carney's and Kramer's launching point for their respective solo careers. Although most of the songs are credited to all three musicians, Hild served as the album's primary songwriter and lyricist.

== Track listing ==
Side one
No.	Title	Writer(s)	Length
1.	"Hands"	Carney, Hild, Kramer	2:28
2.	"Telephone"	Carney, Hild, Kramer	1:26
3.	"Clown"	Carney, Hild, Kramer	3:35
4.	"Nothing"	Carney, Hild, Kramer	3:02
5.	"Bank"	Carney, Kramer	3:12
6.	"Slowly"	Carney, Hild	1:48
7.	"Wanda"	Carney, Kramer	1:48
8.	"Larry"	Carney, Hild, Kramer	3:01

Side two
No.	Title	Writer(s)	Length
1.	"Name" (The Beatles cover)	Lennon–McCartney	5:02
2.	"Barometer"	Carney, Hild, Kramer	1:10
3.	"Treefrog"	Carney	1:36
4.	"Turkeyfaced"	Carney, Hild, Kramer	1:58
5.	"Javalena"	Carney	2:16
6.	"Disguise"	Carney, Hild, Kramer	2:00
7.	"Lotto"	Carney, Hild, Kramer	2:14
8.	"End"	Carney, Hild, Kramer, Plumbly	2:32
9.	"3-D"	Carney, Hild, Kramer	2:49

CD issue
No.	Title	Writer(s)	Length
18.	"Blood Drinking Head Choppers"	Hild	9:27

== Personnel ==
Adapted from Happiness Finally Came to Them liner notes.

Musicians

- Ralph Carney – saxophones, guitars, vocals
- Daved Hild – vocals, drums, percussion
- Kramer – bass guitar, organ, tape, vocals, production, engineering

Additional musicians

- Robin Amos – synthesizer ("Blood Drinking Head Choppers")
- Michael Cudahy – guitar (A3, A4, "Blood Drinking Head Choppers")
- Suzanna Lee – vocals (B2)

Additional musicians (cont.)

- David Licht – percussion (B4, B9)
- Frank London – trumpet ("Blood Drinking Head Choppers")
- Pete Plumbly – guitar (B8)
- Garo Yellin – cello (A8, B4, B9, "Blood Drinking Head Choppers")

Production and additional personnel

- David Larr – art direction
- Michael Macioce – photography

== Release history ==
Region	Date	Label	Format	Catalog
United States	1987	Shimmy Disc	LP	Shimmy-007
Europe	1990	Shimmy Disc	CD	SDE 9027/CD
