= The Brill Building (album) =

Studio album of cover songs by Kramer
- Released: September 25, 2012
- Recorded: 2005 – 2012
- Studio: Noise Miami (Miami, FL)
- Genre: Art pop
- Length: 42:12
- Label: Tzadik
- Producer: Kramer

Kramer chronology
The Greenberg Variations (2003)	The Brill Building (2012)

Professional ratings
Review scores
Source	Rating
PopMatters	(8/10)

The Brill Building is the sixth solo album by American composer and producer Kramer, released on September 25, 2012 by Tzadik Records.

== Track listing ==
No.	Title	Writer(s)	Original artist (date)	Length
1.	"He Hit Me (and It Felt like a Kiss)"	Goffin, King	The Crystals (1962)	3:42
2.	"Do Wah Diddy Diddy"	Barry, Greenwich	the Exciters (1963), Manfred Mann (1964)	3:34
3.	"Baby It's You"	Bacharach, David, Williams	The Shirelles (1961)	4:42
4.	"Spanish Harlem"	Leiber, Spector	Ben E. King (1960)	4:42
5.	"I Love How You Love Me"	Kolber, Mann	The Paris Sisters (1961)	4:32
6.	"I Want Candy"	Berns, Feldman, Goldstein, Gottehrer	The Strangeloves (1965)	4:27
7.	"Save the Last Dance for Me"	Pomus, Shuman	The Drifters (1960)	3:05
8.	"Cherry, Cherry"	Diamond	Neil Diamond (1966)	4:29
9.	"On Broadway"	Leiber, Mann, Stoller, Weil	The Drifters (1963)	4:40
10.	"Paradise"	Botkin, Garfield, Nilsson, Spector	The Ronettes (1976)	4:19

of

== Personnel ==
Adapted from liner notes of The Brill Building.

- Kramer – vocals, instruments, musical arrangement, production, engineering

Additional musicians

- Jad Fair – vocals (9)
- Mike Jones – piano (9)
- R. Stevie Moore – drums (7), guitar (7), vocals (7)
- Daniel C. Smith – vocals (10)

Production and additional personnel

- Heung-Heung Chin – design
- Scott Hull – mastering
- Michael Macioce – photography
- Kazumori Sigiyama – executive producer
- John Zorn – executive producer

== Release history ==
Region	Date	Label	Format	Catalog
United States	2012	Tzadik	CD	TZ 7412
