= Roll Out the Barrel (album) =

Studio album by Jad Fair and Kramer
- Released: 1988
- Recorded: Noise New York; New York City
- Genre: Experimental rock
- Length: 51:11
- Label: Shimmy Disc
- Producer: Kramer

Jad Fair chronology
Best Wishes (1987)	Roll Out the Barrel (1988)	It's Spooky (1989)

Kramer chronology
Happiness Finally Came to Them (1987)	Roll Out the Barrel (1988)	Real Men (1991)

Professional ratings
Review scores
Source	Rating
AllMusic	2/5 stars

Roll Out the Barrel is a studio album by Jad Fair and Kramer, released in 1988 by Shimmy Disc.

== Accolades ==
Publication	Country	Accolade	Year	Rank
Spex	Germany	Albums of the Year	1988	24

== Track listing ==
All lyrics are written by Jad Fair, except where noted; all music is composed by Mark Kramer, except where noted.

No.	Title	Writer(s)	Length
1.	"Cheerleaders Wild Weekend"	Jad Fair, Don Fleming, Mark Kramer	1:13
2.	"Double for Me"		0:59
3.	"Bird of Prey"	Jad Fair, Don Fleming, Mark Kramer	2:41
4.	"Subterranean Homesick Blues" (Bob Dylan cover)	Bob Dylan	1:22
5.	"If It's O.K."		1:24
6.	"Better Safe Than Sorry"		0:22
7.	"Den of Angels"		1:27
8.	"Blind Hope"		1:07
9.	"California"		4:18
10.	"When Is She Coming"		1:24
11.	"Second Thought"		1:39
12.	"Eye of the Hurricane"		0:54
13.	"Best Left Unsaid"		1:27
14.	"No One Knows"		2:21
15.	"By and By"	Traditional arr.	2:17
16.	"Help!" (The Beatles cover)	Lennon–McCartney	2:37
17.	"Around and Around" (Chuck Berry cover)	Chuck Berry	2:01
18.	"What I've Been Waiting For"		1:53
19.	"Load and Mount"		2:58
20.	"Nosferatu"		0:46
21.	"Twist and Shout"	Phil Medley, Bert Russell	1:15
22.	"King Kong" (Daniel Johnston cover)	Daniel Johnston	4:28
23.	"Rockin' Chair"	Hoagy Carmichael	2:31
24.	"Easy to See"		1:24
25.	"On the Sunny Side of the Street"	Dorothy Fields, Jimmy McHugh	2:16
26.	"Flower of the North"		1:44
27.	"Paths of Glory"	Traditional arr.	2:23

== Personnel ==
Adapted from Roll Out the Barrel liner notes.

Musicians

- Jad Fair – vocals, guitar
- Don Fleming – guitar
- Kramer – production, engineering
- David Licht – drums, percussion
- Rebby Sharp – vocals, banjo
- John Zorn – saxophone

Additional musicians

- Ralph Carney – saxophone (9)
- Kim Gordon – instruments (22)
- Scott Jarvis – drums (23)
- Penn Jillette – vocals (4, 21)
- Thurston Moore – instruments (22)

Production and additional personnel

- David Fair – illustrations

== Release history ==
Region	Date	Label	Format	Catalog
United States	1988	Shimmy Disc	CS, LP	shimmy 012
Netherlands	1988	Shimmy Disc	CD, LP	SDE 8802
United States	1999	Shimmy Disc	CD	SHM-5012
