= Daved Hild =

American drummer

Daved Hild (1951-2024) was an American drummer, accordionist and singer-songwriter. He is perhaps best recognized for his collaborations with David Thomas and Kramer.

== History ==
In the late seventies, while studying art history at the Museum of Fine Arts in Boston, Hild formed the experimental punk band The Girls with Robin Amos, George Condo and Mark Dagley. Their first and only studio release was the seven-inch single "Jeffrey I Hear You"/"The Elephant Man", produced by David Thomas of Pere Ubu fame. Eventually Hild joined Thomas in his band The Wooden Birds and played on Monster Walks the Winter Lake, released in 1986. He released several albums on Shimmy Disc with Ralph Carney and Kramer, serving as the primary lyricist, vocalist and drummer for the compositions.

== Discography ==
The Girls

- "Jeffrey I Hear You"/"The Elephant Man" (Hearthan, 1979)

The Wooden Birds

- Monster Walks the Winter Lake (Twin/Tone, 1986)

Collaborations

- with Ralph Carney and Kramer: Happiness Finally Came to Them (Shimmy Disc, 1987)
- with Ralph Carney and Kramer: Black Power (Shimmy Disc, 1994)
- with Kramer: Rubber Hair (Shimmy Disc, 1997)
