= Tattoo of Blood =

Studio album by Captain Howdy
- Released: March 5, 1996
- Recorded: 1993
- Studio: Noise New Jersey (Jersey City, N.J.)
- Genre: Experimental rock, alternative rock
- Length: 39:52
- Label: Shimmy Disc
- Producer: Kramer

Captain Howdy chronology
Tattoo of Blood (1996)	Money Feeds My Music Machine (1998)

Kramer chronology
Still Alive in '95 (1996)	Tattoo of Blood (1996)	Hit Men (1996)

Tattoo of Blood is the debut studio album of Captain Howdy, released on March 5, 1996, by Shimmy Disc. It is a collaboration between musician and producer Kramer and magician Penn Jillette.

== Track listing ==
All lyrics are written by Penn Jillette; all music is composed by Kramer, except "Tattoo of Blood" by Lou Reed.

No.	Title	Length
1.	"We Want Our Vietnam"	3:18
2.	"The Juliet E-mail"	3:07
3.	"China Needs Women"	4:55
4.	"The Hero That Feels Sorry for Himself"	5:16
5.	"Rosabelle"	5:18
6.	"The Wreck of the Captain Howdy"	2:49
7.	"Dino's Head"	7:35
8.	"Tattoo of Blood"	4:22
9.	"The Best Song Ever Written"	3:12

== Personnel ==
Adapted from Tattoo of Blood liner notes.

Captain Howdy

- Penn Jillette – vocals
- Kramer – instruments, production, engineering

Additional musicians

- Soma Allpass – cello
- Debbie Harry – vocals
- Billy West – guitar

Production and additional personnel

- Alan Douches – mastering
- Tony Fitzpatrick – cover art
- Michael Macioce – photography

== Release history ==
Region	Date	Label	Format	Catalog
United States	1996	Shimmy Disc	CD	shimmy 084
