= Who's Afraid? =

Studio album by Daevid Allen and Kramer
- Released: 1992
- Recorded: March 1992
- Studio: Noise New Jersey; Jersey City, New Jersey
- Genre: Experimental rock
- Length: 42:53
- Label: Shimmy Disc
- Producer: Kramer

Daevid Allen chronology
Seven Drones (1991)	Who's Afraid? (1992)	Je ne fum' pas des bananes (1992)

Kramer chronology
The Guilt Trip (1992)	Who's Afraid? (1992)	Egomaniacs (1993)

Who's Afraid? is a studio album by Daevid Allen and Kramer, released in 1992 by Shimmy Disc.

== Track listing ==
All lyrics are written by Daevid Allen; all music is composed by Mark Kramer

No.	Title	Length
1.	"Thinking Thoughts"	3:17
2.	"Love"	3:27
3.	"Who's Afraid?"	4:24
4.	"Shadow"	4:20
5.	"Bopera III"	3:39
6.	"Pretty Teacher"	2:51
7.	"Call It Accident"	2:58
8.	"Song for Robert"	3:52
9.	"C'est la Maison"	1:48
10.	"More and More"	5:49
11.	"Quit Yr Bullshit"	6:28

== Personnel ==
Adapted from Who's Afraid? liner notes.

Musicians

- Daevid Allen – vocals, guitar, acoustic guitar
- Kramer – vocals, guitar, bass guitar, keyboards, flute, production, engineering
- David Licht – drums, percussion

Production and additional personnel

- Michael Macioce – photography
- Mark Weinberg – art direction, design

== Release history ==
Region	Date	Label	Format	Catalog
United States	1992	Shimmy Disc	CD, CS, LP	shimmy 060
