= Deni Bonet =

American singer-songwriter

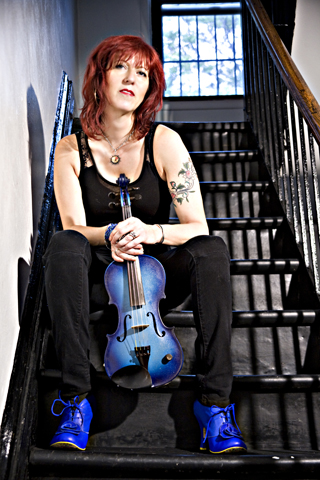

Background information
- Genres: Indie pop, indie folk, alternative rock
- Occupations: Singer-songwriter, multi-instrumentalist, composer, string arranger at overdubstrings.com
- Instruments: Electric violin, acoustic violin, viola, ukulele, accordion, guitar, piano, mandolin
- Labels: Zip Records (Sony/RED) and M*R2 Records
- Website: www.denibonet.com

Deni Bonet is an American singer-songwriter, electric violinist, and multi-instrumentalist. She began her professional career in the house band of National Public Radio’s Mountain Stage radio show. She left to pursue a solo career and also became a prolific session musician. She has toured and recorded with many notable performers including Cyndi Lauper, R.E.M., Sarah McLachlan, Richard Barone, and Robyn Hitchcock, and has released several CDs of her own original music.

== Career ==
Bonet has performed on several national television shows, including Saturday Night Live, Late Night with Conan O'Brien, The Today Show, and Last Call with Carson Daly. She was also a guest on an episode of the nationally syndicated Nate Berkus Show, discussing her unique holiday decorating style, and was featured in an episode of Fox Television's Ambush Makeover.

Bonet was featured in the Jonathan Demme movie Storefront Hitchcock performing alongside Robyn Hitchcock. She was also the subject of a 2001 Wall Street Journal article on how artists were affected by the downturn in the economy, and a 2003 Billboard magazine article on her NYC-area cable TV show Duets with Deni.

Duets featured live performances by local and international performers, accompanied by Bonet. Each 30-minute show featured two songs written by the guest, two written by Bonet, and the show ended with a cover tune chosen by both Bonet and her guest. Season One featured Sean Altman, Jenny Bruce, Dave Foster, Roger Greenawalt, Lach, Richard Barone, Robyn Hitchcock, Kimberley Rew, and Bari Koral. Season Two featured Jon Spurney, Bill Clift, Christine Ohlman, Mary Lee Kortes, John Wesley Harding, and Patti Rothberg.

Bonet's music has been featured in several television shows, including Cathouse and Passions, and she has scored the soundtracks of the American Civil War drama Red Legged Devils and the Western drama West of Thunder, in which she also appears. Bonet is also featured in Richard Barone's Cool Blue Halo 25th Anniversary Concert DVD released in 2012.

She is an endorsee of Barcus-Berry Electric Violins, Martin Guitars, Kala Brand Ukuleles, Daisy Rock Girl Guitars, and Thomastik-Infeld Strings in the US and worldwide. Bonet also operates OverdubStrings.com, an online business that creates and arranges violin, fiddle, and accordion tracks for studio and home recording projects.

Bonet was invited to accompany Irish multi-platinum performer Mundy (born Edmund Enright) at the official White House St Patrick's Day reception in Washington DC, where they performed several songs for President Barack Obama, First Lady Michelle Obama, Vice President Joe Biden, the Taoiseach (Prime Minister) of Ireland, and several hundred invited guests.

In February 2017 Bonet released the all-instrumental album Bright Shiny Objects on Zip Records, distributed on Sony RED in the US and Rough Trade in the Benelux countries. Featuring songs co-written with Stephen Gaboury, Richard Barone and Jon Cobert, the album was recorded with session musicians including Shawn Pelton, Will Lee, Steve Holley, Graham Maby, and Liberty DeVitto.

Subsequent to the release of the album, Bonet embarked on two-month-long European tours, performing in the UK (including the legendary Cavern Club in Liverpool), Ireland, Belgium, the Netherlands and Finland.

The Huffington Post published an article about Bonet in September 2017 which included the premiere of the video for "Light This Candle".

In October 2017 Bonet premiered orchestral versions of several of her recordings, performing with the award-winning Baylor University Symphony, including two orchestrated by Gene Pritsker, one by Stephen Gaboury, and Edgar Winter's "Frankenstein (instrumental)" orchestrated by Danny Elfman's orchestrator Steve Bartek (who has orchestrated the music for all of Tim Burton's movies).

In February 2018 Bonet was invited back to Carnegie Hall, performing an electric set culminating with Edgar Winter's "Frankenstein (instrumental)".

In 2019 Bonet was appointed an Arts Envoy by the US State Department, and spent August in Zanzibar at the Dhow Countries Music Academy teaching songwriting, violin, and rock n' roll. The residency culminated with a televised concert, sponsored by the US Embassy in Dar es Salaam.

In January 2020 Bonet returned to Zanzibar to record original music with the Tanzanian band, Stone Town Rockerz, which will appear on her upcoming album.

In February she appeared once again at Carnegie Hall as a headliner as part of the Sixth Chinese New Year Spectacular, and also performed as soloist, performing orchestrations of her original music with the Danbury (CT) Community Orchestra.

Her final performance before the pandemic lockdown was performing as a guest of The Chieftains at Kimmel Center for the Performing Arts in Philadelphia, PA.

During the Pandemic, Bonet streamed live performances entitled “Happy Hour Live with Deni Bonet” from her home studio in New York City to a global audience.

She will be releasing a new album in early 2024 titled "Off The Record", which she co-produced with the multiple-Grammy nominated James Frazee, and her longtime musical duo partner, Chris Flynn. It was mastered by Scott Hull of Masterdisk.

Several singles from "Off The Record" have been released on streaming media in advance of the album's release. The first single, "Why Not You?", released in July 2022, was co-written with Cassandra Kubinski, and features Graham Maby on Bass, Doug Yowell on Drums, and Matt Beck on Wurlitzer. The second single, released on April 7, was co-written with John Cobert who also plays piano on the track. Additional performers include Shawn Pelton on drums, Will Lee on bass, and Stan Harrison on saxophone. The third single, released on June 2, is a cover of Crowded House's "I Am In Love" which appeared on the 2016 reissue of "Together Alone". Written by Neil Finn, Deni's cover includes the Spin Doctors’ Aaron Comess on drums and Eric Schenkman on guitar, Michael J Visceglia on bass, with additional guitar from Ben Butler and Deni's musical partner Chris Flynn.

In addition to her solo work, Bonet has also been performing as a duo for the past five years with Chris Flynn (guitar and vocals), and she continues to work as an in-demand session musician and has performed with, and contributed to, music by notable Irish musicians Mundy, Larry Kirwan, Cathy Maguire, and Michael Brunnock.

== Discography ==
- A.C. Rose - How The Other Half Lives (2023) played Violin, Viola and Accordion
- William Sadler - The Kitchen Tapes (2023) played Violin, Viola, Accordion and String Arrangements
- The Transmissionary Six - Often Sometimes Rarely Never (2023) played Viola
- The Split Squad - Another Cinderella (2021) played Strings and String Arrangements
- John Brennan - No Offense, None Taken (2021) played Violin and Ukulele
- Matt Owens (of Noah and the Whale) - Hungover in New York (2020) played Violin
- Luan Parle – Never Say Goodbye (2020) played Violin
- Marci Geller – Bare (2019) strings and string arrangements, also Accordion
- Larry Kirwan - Heroes/Belfast EP (2018) played Violin, Strings and Vocals
- Salim Nourallah - Somewhere South Of Sane (2018) played Violin, Viola and String Arrangements
- Deni Bonet – Bright Shiny Objects (2017) Main performer
- Niall Connolly – Dream Your Way Out Of This One (2017) played Violin, Viola and String Arrangements
- Tiny Tim – Tiny Tim's America (2016) played Accordion and Violin
- Larry Groce, Michael Cerveris and Everybody – Take Me Home Country Roads (2016) played Violin
- Honor Finnegan – Roses And Victory (2016) played Violin
- The Junior League – Also Rans (2015) played Violin, Viola and String Arrangements
- Amy Soucy – This River (2015) played Violin
- Kevin Brown – Grit (2015) played Violin
- Rebecca Lowe – Rebecca Lowe (2015) – string arrangements, played Violins
- Eupana – So Many Suns (2014) string arrangements, played Violin and Viola
- Judy Kass – Better Things (2014) played Violin and Viola
- Deni Bonet – It's All Good (2013) Main performer
- Jade Summers – Vintage (2013) played Violin, Viola and String Arrangements
- The Junior League – You Should Be Happy (2013) played Violin, and String Arrangements
- Friction Farm – I Read Your Book (2013) played Violin
- The Fishkillers – West Of Thunder (2013) played Violin, Viola, Accordion, Ukulele and Vocals
- Pete Seeger – God's Counting On Me, God's Counting On You (2012) played Violin, and Chorus
- Richard Barone – Cool Blue Halo 25th Anniversary Concert (2012) played Violin
- Arlon Bennett – World Of Possibility (2012) played Violin
- Gathering Time – Red Apples And Gold (2012) played Violin
- Kati Mac – Save Me From Myself (2012) played Violin
- Pinataland – Hymns for the Dreadful Night (2011) played Violin and Viola
- Richard X. Heyman – Tiers: And Other Stories (2011) played Viola and Violin
- Luminosity – Luminosity (2011) played Accordion and Violin
- Richard Barone – Glow (2010) played Violin
- The Cynthia Kaplan Ordeal – Fangry (2010) played Violin
- Ken Bari Murray – Four Seasons (2010) played Violin
- Clara Lofaro – Clara Lofaro (2010) played Violin, and String Arrangements
- John Wesley Harding – Who Was Changed And Who Was Dead (2009) played Violin, Viola, String Arrangements and Vocals
- Rosemary Loar – Indigo and Iridescent (2009) played Viola and Violin
- Tiny Tim – I've Never Seen a Straight Banana: Rare Moments, Vol. 1 (2009) played Accordion, Ukulele, Viola, Violin and Vocals
- Bud Buckley – Sitting On The Wind (2009) played Violin and Viola
- Meg Braun – Tomboy Princess (2009) played Violin
- Deni Bonet – Last Girl On Earth (2008) Main performer
- Deni Bonet – It's You And Me This Christmas (2008) Main performer
- Gene Clark and Carla Olson – In Concert (2007) played Violin and Vocals
- Jewmongous (feat. Sean Altman)- Taller Than Jesus (2007) played Violin
- Jenn Friedman – Open Book (2007) played Violin
- Bud Buckley – It's About Time (2007) played Violin and Viola
- Jen Eliott & Bluestruck – This Damn Song (2006) played Viola and Violin
- Dave Rave – Anthology, Vol. 1: The Hot Tunes (2006) played Violin and Vocals
- Clara Lofaro – Black + Blue Pearl (2006) played Viola and Violin
- Dave Revels – Family Ties (2006) played Violin and Accordion
- Jen Elliott – This Damn Song (2006) played Violin and Cello
- Sarah McLachlan – Surfacing/Solace (2005) played Viola, Violin and String Arrangements
- The L Word – L Word: The Second Season Sessions (2005) played Viola and Violin
- Brian Lane Green – Waiting for the Glaciers to Melt (2005) played Violin
- Various Artists – String Quartet Tribute to Weezer: Pull This String (2005) played Viola and Violin
- Judy Gorman – Analog Girl In A Digital World (2005) played Viola and Violin
- Deni Bonet - Acoustic, OK? (2004) played Violin, Viola, Accordion and Vocals
- The Hyperjinx Tricycle – Songs of Jack Medicine, Daniel Johnston & Ron English (2004) played Violin
- Various Artists – String Quartet Tribute to Weezer: Come On and Kick Me (2004) played Viola and Violin
- Bibi Farber – Second Kiss (2004) played Violin
- Lora Lee and Leo – Blue Horse (2003) played Violin, Viola and Accordion
- Lee Cave-Berry – Spring Forward (2003) played Violin
- Drive Til Morning – Drive Til Morning (2002) played Viola and Violin
- Sean Altman – alt.mania (2002) played Violin
- Lora Lee and Robbie – You Can't Half Tell (2002) played Violin and Viola
- Chris Butler – Museum Of Me, Vol. 1 (2002) played Violin
- Deni Bonet – Bigger Is Always Better (2001) Main performer
- Various Artists – Zipped Up And Down (Under) (2001) played Violin and Vocals
- Violet – We Both Know It's Out There (2001) played Accordion, Viola and Violin
- Tom Paxton – Live From Mountain Stage (2001) played Violin and Vocals
- Esther – Eve's Lament (2001) played Viola and Violin
- The Parlor Dogs – Social Harem (2000) played Accordion and Vocals
- Taylor Barton – 13 Break Ups (2000) played Accordion, Viola, Violin and Vocals
- Marc Farre – Man on the Sun (2000) played Violin
- Robyn Hitchcock – Storefront Hitchcock (2000) played Violin
- Various Artists – Songs Of Bruce Springsteen (2000) played Violin (performing with Ben E King)
- Lach – Blang! (1999) played Viola and Violin
- Lauren Agnelli & Dave Rave – Heaven & Earth (1999) played Violin
- The Novellas – Magnets in Intimate Places (1999) played Viola and Violin
- Kramer – Let Me Explain Something To You About Art (1998) played Accordion, Viola and Violin
- Various Artists – What's That I Hear?: The Songs of Phil Ochs (1998) played Viola, Violin and Vocals (performed with Lauren Agnelli, Dave Rave, and Pat Humphries)
- Glen or Glenda – Reasons in the Sun (1998) played Viola and Violin
- Judy Gorman – Analog Girl in a Digital World (1998) played Violin and Viola
- Fuzzbuddy – Fuzzbuddy (1998) played Violin
- Various Artists – Texans Live From Mountain Stage (1997) played Violin and Vocals (performed with Sara Hickman)
- Gravity Kills – Manipulated (1997) played Violin
- Various Artists – One Step Up/Two Steps Back: The Songs of Bruce Springsteen (1997) played Violin
- Lauren Agnelli & Dave Rave – Confetti (1997) played Violin
- Various Artists – Celtic Music Live From Mountain Stage (1997) played Violin (performed with Luka Bloom)
- Various Artists – Louisiana Live From Mountain Stage (1996) played Fiddle (performed with Allen Toussaint)
- Robyn Hitchcock – Moss Elixir / Mossy Liquor (1996) played Percussion, Piano and Violin
- Sarah McLachlan – Rarities, B-Sides & Other Stuff [1996] (1996) played Viola and Violin
- Various Artists – Women: Live From Mountain Stage (1996) played Violin and Vocals (performing with Victoria Williams)
- Deni Bonet – Deni Bonet (1996) Main performer
- Various Artists – Live From Mountain Stage, Vol. 8 (1995) played Violin (performing with John Gorka)
- Iain Matthews – Camouflage (1995) played Violin
- Various Artists – Christmas at Mountain Stage (1994) played Violin and Vocals (performed with Michael Martin Murphey and Mike Seeger)
- Various Artists – Upfront! Canadians Live from Mountain Stage (1994) played Violin (performed with Sarah McLachlan)
- Lim Giong – Entertainment World (1994) played Violin (incorrectly credited as Denny Bonnett)
- Various Artists – Best Of Mountain Stage Live, Vol. 5 (1993) played Violin (performing with Kevin Welch)
- Maryen Cairns – For Eternity (1993) played Violin
- Various Artists – Best Of Mountain Stage, Live Vol. 4 (1992) played Violin (performing with Allen Toussaint and Tracy Nelson
- Various Artists – Best of Mountain Stage, Live Vol. 3 (1992) played Violin (performing with Warren Zevon and Sarah McLachlan)
- Rod MacDonald – Highway To Nowhere (1992) played Violin
- R.E.M. – Out Of Time (1991) tour played Violin
- Sarah McLachlan – Path Of Thorns (1991) played Viola, Violin and String Arrangements
- Sarah McLachlan – Solace (1991) played Viola, Violin Arrangements and String Arrangements
- Chris Whitley – Living with the Law (1991) played Viola
- Various Artists – Best of Mountain Stage, Live Vol. 2 (1991) played Violin (performing with R.E.M., Robyn Hitchcock, and Michelle Shocked)
- Various Artists – Best of Mountain Stage, Live Vol. 1 (1991) played Violin
- Stark Raven – Learning To Fly (1989) played Violin and Vocals
- Stark Raven – One Hundred Million Reasons (1985) played Violin and Vocals

== Film credits ==
- Richard Barone Cool Blue Halo 25th Anniversary Concert (2012) – performs as herself
- West of Thunder (2012) – appears as the fiddler
- Cyndi Lauper – Live… At Last (2004) played Violin
- Robyn Hitchcock – Storefront Hitchcock (1998) played Violin
- Chillers (1987) – performing as one half of The Fabulous Twister Sisters
