= Greenberg Variations =

The Greenberg Variations

Studio album by Kramer
- Released: March 25, 2003
- Recorded: 2002
- Studio: Noise New York (New York City, NY)
- Genre: Ambient, chamber music
- Length: 45:47
- Label: Tzadik
- Producer: Kramer

Kramer chronology
The Sound of Music (1999)	The Greenberg Variations (2003)	The Brill Building (2012)

The Greenberg Variations is the fifth solo album by American composer and producer Kramer, released on March 25, 2003 by Tzadik Records.

== Track listing ==
All music is composed by Kramer.

No.	Title	Length
1.	"The Curve Ball"	4:29
2.	"The Emery Ball"	2:37
3.	"The Spit Ball"	2:34
4.	"The Goo Ball"	3:28
5.	"The Screw Ball"	2:23
6.	"The Knuckle Ball"	3:07
7.	"The Ephus Ball"	2:05
8.	"The Sinker Ball"	3:03
9.	"The Slider"	1:57
10.	"The Splitter"	2:18
11.	"The Fast Ball"	2:48
12.	"The Change Up"	3:10
13.	"The Slow Ball"	3:47
14.	"The Breaking Ball"	2:48
15.	"The Bean Ball"	2:38
16.	"The Strike Out"	2:35

== Personnel ==
Adapted from the liner notes to The Greenberg Variations.

- Kramer – instruments, musical arrangement, production, engineering
- Heung-Heung Chin – design
- Scott Hull – mastering
- Michael Macioce – photography
- Kazumori Sigiyama – executive producer
- John Zorn – executive producer

== Release history ==
Region	Date	Label	Format	Catalog
United States	2003	Tzadik	CD	TZ 7176
