= Songs from the Pink Death =

Studio album by Kramer
- Released: February 17, 1998
- Recorded: 1996
- Studio: Noise New Jersey (Jersey City, NJ)
- Genre: Experimental rock
- Length: 47:13
- Label: Knitting Factory/Shimmy Disc
- Producer: Kramer

Kramer chronology
| Let Me Explain Something to You About Art (1998) | Songs from the Pink Death (1998) | Money Feeds My Music Machine (1998) |

Professional ratings
Review scores
| Source | Rating |
|---|---|
| AllMusic | 2.5/5 stars |

Songs from the Pink Death is the fourth studio album by composer and producer Kramer, released on February 17, 1998, by Shimmy Disc and Knitting Factory Records. The album features backup musicians including drummer Damon Krukowski of Galaxie 500 and guitarist Sean Eden of Luna. The album is replete with obscure and obvious references such as to "Sunday Morning" in "Don't Come Around", John Malkovich's character's theory in The Convent in "The Opium Wars Have Long Ceased", and the sample from "Wipe Out (instrumental)" in "The Pink Death Song of Love". The album also includes a cover of The Beatles' "You've Got to Hide Your Love Away".

== Track listing ==
All tracks are written by Mark Kramer, except "You've Got to Hide Your Love Away" by John Lennon.

| No. | Title | Length |
|---|---|---|
| 1. | "The Funny Scene" | 5:12 |
| 2. | "Buddy Holly Will Never Die" | 4:30 |
| 3. | "The Opium Wars Have Long Ceased" | 2:50 |
| 4. | "Don't Come Around" | 3:42 |
| 5. | "The Parasite Song" | 5:06 |
| 6. | "The Pink Death Song of Love" | 3:00 |
| 7. | "It Never Stops Being Absurd" | 5:33 |
| 8. | "Eddie Called Back on the Carphone" | 4:56 |
| 9. | "You've Got to Hide Your Love Away" | 3:42 |
| 10. | "The Hot Dog Song" | 4:43 |
| 11. | "It's Alright If She Don't Love You Right" | 3:59 |

== Personnel ==
Adapted from Songs from the Pink Death liner notes.

Musicians

- Sean Eden – guitar
- Kramer – vocals, guitar, bass guitar, keyboards, mellotron, tape, percussion, production, engineering
- Damon Krukowski – drums

Production and additional personnel

- D. Bias – design
- Michael Macioce – photography
- Jed Rothenberg – assistant engineer
- Steve Watson – assistant engineer

== Release history ==
| Region | Date | Label | Format | Catalog |
|---|---|---|---|---|
| United States | 1998 | Shimmy Disc | CD | shimmy 080 |
| United States | 1998 | Knitting Factory | CD | KFR-502 |
