= A Remark Hugh Made =

Studio album by Hugh Hopper & Kramer
- Released: 1994
- Recorded: January 15 – January 19, 1994
- Studio: Noise New Jersey; Jersey City, New Jersey
- Genre: Progressive rock
- Length: 44:16
- Label: Shimmy Disc
- Producer: Kramer

Hugh Hopper chronology
Hooligan Romantics (1994)	A Remark Hugh Made (1994)	Carousel (1995)

Kramer chronology
Hot Day in Waco (1994)	A Remark Hugh Made (1994)	Black Power (1994)

Professional ratings
Review scores
Source	Rating
AllMusic	3/5 stars

A Remark Hugh Made is a studio album by Hugh Hopper and Kramer, released in 1994 by Shimmy Disc.

== Track listing ==
No.	Title	Writer(s)	Length
1.	"Free Will & Testament"	Mark Kramer, Robert Wyatt	3:18
2.	"A Streetcar Named Desire"	Hugh Hopper, Kramer	4:29
3.	"We Can Work It Out" (The Beatles cover)	Lennon–McCartney	3:26
4.	"The Twelve Chairs"	Hopper, Kramer	2:23
5.	"This Island Earth"	Hopper, Kramer	2:37
6.	"Superthunderstingercar"	Hopper	3:51
7.	"John Milton Is Dead"	Hopper, Kramer	4:02
8.	"All in My Head"	Hopper, Kramer	2:36
9.	"Sliding Dogs"	Hopper	4:24
10.	"His Wife for a Hat"	Hopper	2:13
11.	"Lenny Bruce Sings"	Hopper, Kramer	5:27
12.	"His Hat for a Wife"	Hopper	2:49
13.	"Our Final Remark"	Hopper, Kramer	2:42

== Personnel ==
Adapted from A Remark Hugh Made liner notes.

Musicians

- Bill Bacon – drums, percussion
- Hugh Hopper – bass guitar
- Randolph A. Hudson III – guitar
- Kramer – vocals, slide guitar, piano, organ, mellotron, percussion, production, engineering, bass guitar (3)
- Gary Windo – tenor saxophone, vocals

Additional musicians

- Robert Wyatt – lead vocals (1)

Production and additional personnel

- DAM – design
- Michael Macioce – photography
- Steve Watson – assistant producer, assistant engineer

== Release history ==
Region	Date	Label	Format	Catalog
United States	1994	Shimmy Disc	CD	shimmy 076
