= Matt Brubeck =

American musician

Charles Matthew Brubeck
- Also known as: Matt Brubeck
- Born: May 9, 1961 (age 65); Norwalk, Connecticut
- Genres: Classical, jazz, rock
- Occupations: Cellist, pianist, keyboardist
- Instruments: Cello, piano, keyboard

Charles Matthew "Matt" Brubeck (born May 9, 1961) is an American cellist, bassist, keyboardist, composer, and arranger. He is both a performer of classical music and jazz and rock.

== Early life and career ==
Matt Brubeck was born in Norwalk, Connecticut. The youngest son of legendary jazz pianist Dave Brubeck, he started playing piano at the age of three. However, when his school orchestra needed a cello player, he took it up. He later studied under Aldo Parisot at the Yale School of Music, where he received a Master's degree in cello performance. In 1990 he issued a CD "Really", with David Widelock on Jazzpoint records.

In the 1990s, Brubeck founded the Oranj Symphonette and released two albums on the Rykodisc label. He also performed with the Club Foot Orchestra in the mid-1990s. He has arranged music for several films and the music of Thomas Mapfumo for the Kronos Quartet, the music of Nino Rota for Club Foot Orchestra, and the Haydn Society orchestra of Boston.

He worked with Tom Waits in 2002 on his album Alice. As of 2012 he is a member of Sheryl Crow's band and has also worked with Yo-Yo Ma, Evan Parker, Carlos del Junco, John Geggie, Tanya Kalmanovitch, Pierre Tanguay, Anne Bourne, and David Mott. He is on the faculty at York University and Humber College. In 2012 he received a Juno Award as part of Stretch Orchestra for Instrumental Album of the Year.
