= Captain Howdy (band) =

American alternative rock band

Captain Howdy was an alternative rock band formed by Mark Kramer and Penn Jillette that existed between 1992 and 1997. The group disbanded in 1997 when Penn relocated to Las Vegas.

== Discography ==
They released two albums, the first of which was Tattoo of Blood (1994) featuring Deborah Harry (Blondie) on two tracks, guitarist Billy West (Futurama/Ren & Stimpy) on the same two tracks and cellist Soma Allpass Hammarlund throughout. The title track was written by Lou Reed after he heard Penn's story about getting an inkless tattoo. Cover art was by Tony Fitzpatrick.

The second album, Money Feeds My Music Machine (1997), features the return of Billy West plus the addition of Bill Bacon on percussion and "Tess" supplying vocals to the song "Man Bites Dog". Cover art was again by Tony Fitzpatrick with additional art by Reneé French.

Singles

- Captain Howdy - The Best Song Ever Written
