= The Mabuses =

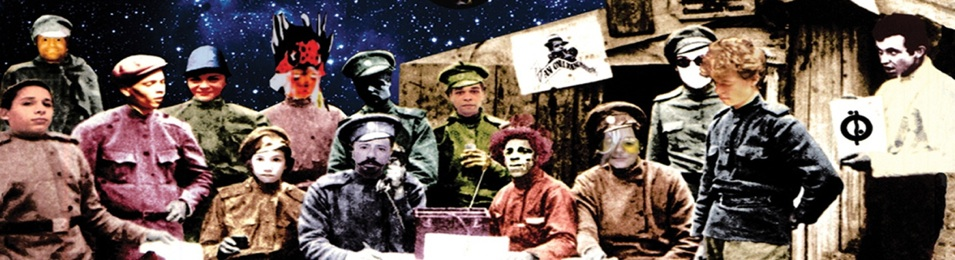

Background information
- Origin: London, England
- Genres: Alternative rock, psychedelic, experimental rock
- Years active: 1990–present
- Labels: Magpie Recordings, One Little Indian, Rough Trade, Virgin, Shimmy Disc
- Members: John Valentine Carruthers; Chris Wilson; Kim Fahy; Lucien de Belleville; Donna McKevitt; Chris Burrows; Trevor Sharpe; Bernard Viguie; Maëva Le Berre; Anne Millioud-Gouverneur; Tatiana Mladenovitch
- Website: www.themabuses.com

The Mabuses is a band which formed in London in 1991 and released three albums to considerable critical acclaim. Led by the enigmatic Kim Fahy, the Mabuses offer music which mixes pop sensibilities with more esoteric concerns such as film and literature. The name "Mabuses" is a tribute to the Fritz Lang film trilogy about a master criminal called Dr. Mabuse. Lyrically and musically, their recordings can be described as modern psychedelia.

"The Mabuses is supremely idealistic pop, cut according to the belief that the form should entice, baffle and ruffle rather than provide a readily assimilable template. Fahy's rhythmic/melodic charge is rooted in folk-derived Brit-pop, the kind that typified 1967's psychedelic headcharge, a.k.a. Syd Barrett's Pink Floyd and the Soft Machine, with that nursery rhyme loopiness – whimsy and surrealism simultaneously, all strangeness, quirk and charm – where nothing is quite as it seems." (Martin Aston – College Music Journal)

In 2007, an album of new material entitled Mabused! was released. It featured guitarist John Valentine Carruthers (previously of Siouxsie and the Banshees) who co-composed several songs with Fahy. Pitchfork rated it 7.2 out of ten, saying "Mabused welcomes a brave new world". AllMusic rated it four out of five stars, qualifying it as "compelling".

== Discography ==
- 1991: Mabuses (Rough Trade Records)
- 1994: Melbourne Method (Rough Trade Records)
- 2007: Mabused! (Magpie Records)
