= The Secret of Comedy =

Studio album by Kramer
- Released: August 5, 1994
- Recorded: 1993–1994
- Studio: Noise New Jersey; Jersey City, New Jersey
- Genre: Psychedelic rock
- Length: 52:31
- Label: Shimmy Disc
- Producer: Kramer

Kramer chronology
Egomaniacs (1993)	The Secret of Comedy (1994)	Hot Day in Waco (1994)

Professional ratings
Review scores
Source	Rating
AllMusic	4/5 stars
NME	(7/10)

The Secret of Comedy is the second studio album by composer and producer Kramer, released on August 5, 1994, by Shimmy Disc.

== Track listing ==
All tracks are written by Mark Kramer.

No.	Title	Length
1.	"Nine Minus Seven Is Two"	4:59
2.	"The Secret of Suicide"	3:58
3.	"Midnight"	2:58
4.	"Stings"	3:35
5.	"The Secret of Philosophy"	3:31
6.	"I Can Watch"	5:39
7.	"Who Are You Today?"	6:22
8.	"My Rock 'n Roll"	2:52
9.	"The Secret of the Band"	4:37
10.	"Sounds Like?"	3:05
11.	"Wishing Well"	5:45
12.	"Second Coda"	5:10

== Personnel ==
Adapted from The Secret of Comedy liner notes.

Musicians

- Bill Bacon – drums, percussion
- Randolph A. Hudson III – guitar
- Kramer – vocals, slide guitar, bass guitar, electric piano, synthesizer, mellotron, flute, tape, percussion, production, engineering

Production and additional personnel

- DAM – design
- Michael Macioce – photography
- Steve Watson – assistant producer, assistant engineer

== Release history ==
Region	Date	Label	Format	Catalog
United States	1994	Shimmy Disc	CD	shimmy 075
