= The Guilt Trip (album) =

Studio album by Kramer
- Released: 1992
- Recorded: August 1991–October 1992
- Studio: Noise New Jersey; Jersey City, New Jersey
- Genre: Experimental rock, psychedelic rock
- Length: 127:34
- Label: Shimmy Disc
- Producer: Kramer

Kramer chronology
Real Men (1991)	The Guilt Trip (1992)	Who's Afraid? (1992)

Professional ratings
Review scores
Source	Rating
AllMusic	4/5 stars

The Guilt Trip is the debut triple album by composer and producer Kramer. It was released in 1992 by Shimmy Disc.

The album's cover is a parody of George Harrison's All Things Must Pass.

== Track listing ==
All tracks are written by Mark Kramer.

Disc one
No.	Title	Length
1.	"Overture"	4:13
2.	"Stupid Summer"	4:09
3.	"Got What I Deserved"	4:54
4.	"Wish I Were In Heaven"	3:02
5.	"Not Guilty"	2:34
6.	"Wisdom Sits"	2:48
7.	"Stubb's Hallucination"	2:10
8.	"The Drowning Heart"	1:25
9.	"Welcome Home"	5:06
10.	"Swallow Up Jonah"	2:42
11.	"Hello Music"	4:32
12.	"The Murder of God"	1:56
13.	"You Don't Know"	3:08
14.	"The Wall of Sleep"	2:22
15.	"The Guilt Trip"	4:48
16.	"Wait for the Hate"	3:00
17.	"Natasha Disappears"	1:58
18.	"Big of You"	3:53
19.	"My Friend Daniel"	1:36

Disc two
No.	Title	Length
1.	"The Maximus Poems"	3:48
2.	"The Seven Seizures"	4:07
3.	"Thank You Music"	6:09
4.	"Kathleen I'm Sorry"	4:28
5.	"God Will See You"	5:36
6.	"I'm Your Fan"	2:24
7.	"The Bosom Friend"	5:23
8.	"I Love You"	1:48
9.	"Next Time Try Compassion"	3:56
10.	"Charlotte's Brain"	2:57
11.	"Mudd Hutt Four"	4:34
12.	"The Well Hung Jury"	3:03
13.	"Won't Get Far Without Me"	4:42
14.	"Ball Five"	4:58
15.	"She Won't Let Go"	3:53
16.	"I've Seen the End"	3:59
17.	"Coda"	1:33

== Personnel ==
Adapted from The Guilt Trip liner notes.

Musicians

- Samm Bennett – percussion
- Randolph A. Hudson III – guitar
- Kramer – vocals, instruments, engineering, production
- David Licht – drums percussion

Production and additional personnel

- DAM – design
- Michael Macioce – photography

== Release history ==
Region	Date	Label	Format	Catalog
United States	1992	Shimmy Disc	CD, CS, LP	shimmy 055
United States	1998	Shimmy Disc	CD	SHM-5055
