= Ralph Carney =

American musician (1956–2017)

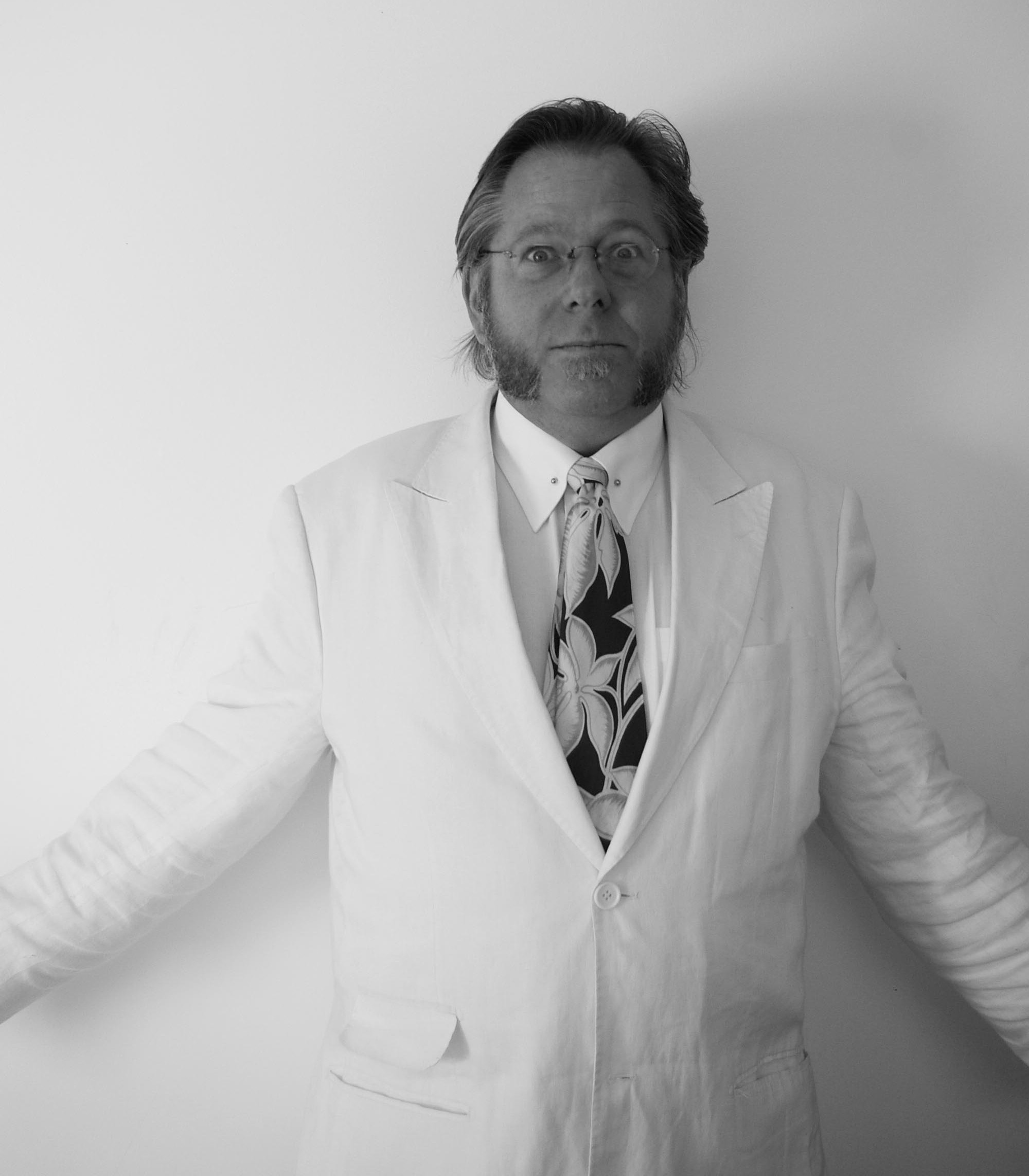
- Carney in 2010

Background information
- Born: January 23, 1956; Akron, Ohio, U.S.
- Died: December 17, 2017 (aged 61) Portland, Oregon, U.S.
- Genres: Jazz; avant-garde; experimental rock
- Occupations: Singer; composer; multi-instrumentalist
- Instruments: Vocals; saxophone; clarinet; flute; harmonica; Jew's harp
- Labels: Shimmy Disc; Birdman; Black Beauty; Akroncracker
- Formerly of: Tin Huey; Oranj Symphonette
- Website: ralphcarney.bandcamp.com

Ralph Carney (January 23, 1956 – December 17, 2017) was an American multi-instrumentalist, singer and composer. While his primary instruments were various saxophones and clarinets, Carney also collected and played many instruments, often unusual or obscure ones.

He is best known for his long association with Tom Waits and for his collaboration on the theme song for BoJack Horseman, along with his nephew Patrick Carney.

== Early years ==
Carney was born and grew up in Akron, Ohio, and listened to music on a windup record player. He was the youngest of three siblings. His father, William Carney, worked in polyester research for Goodyear Tire & Rubber Co., headquartered in Akron. Ralph Carney showed an early interest in art, but turned to music in the eighth grade. He started learning five string banjo, violin, and harmonica and played bluegrass and country blues. His father, as well as his mother, Madge Carney, encouraged his interest in music. At age 15 he started to play saxophone. He also worked in a mall record store.

== Career ==
Carney got his start as a professional musician as a founding member of the experimental rock and new wave band Tin Huey. In addition to work with Tin Huey in the 1970s and Tom Waits from the 1980s onwards, Carney also recorded or performed with Dieselhed, Marc Ribot, the B-52's, Elvis Costello, Jonathan Richman, Les Claypool, St. Vincent, Stan Ridgway, Medeski Martin & Wood, Jed Davis, Bill Laswell, Griddle, and HowellDevine, among others. In 1981, Carney was one of the lead members of the Swollen Monkeys, along with Mars Williams later of the Psychedelic Furs : the group released an album that year Afterbirth of the Cool produced by Hal Willner. Carney released several solo albums and was a member of the Oranj Symphonette with fellow Waits alumni Joe Gore and Matt Brubeck. He also headed up San Francisco's Carneyball Johnson, playing on saxophones, Turkish clarinet, piccolo, trumpet, percussion and vocals.

Carney collaborated with the Black Keys on their studio album Attack & Release (2008). He occasionally joined them on stage when they toured that record. In 2014, he collaborated with his nephew Patrick for the BoJack Horseman theme song. He toured with They Might Be Giants in the fall of 2009. He recorded and performed with Black Francis in 2008 a score for the silent film Der Golem (1920), he guested with Yo La Tengo and Medeski Martin & Wood for live shows in 2010 and 2011. He recorded on a T Bone Burnett-produced project the Ghost Brothers of Darkland County with Marc Ribot and Elvis Costello, as yet unreleased. He performed on many Hal Willner-produced shows at UCLA's Royce Hall including a Tribute to Harry Smith in 2001, with a huge number of performers including Todd Rundgren, Philip Glass, and David Johansen.

Carney composed music for two poetry records on Paris Records. One was with poet Robert Creeley called Really!. He also did music for an Ira Cohen record called the Stauffenberg Cycle. In 1994 Ralph performed on the Kathy Acker record Redoing Childhood (Paris Records). He did some songs for some flash Web Premiere Toons cartoons on CartoonNetwork.com in 2001. His old band Tin Huey put out a compilation CD of unreleased material in 2009 on Smog Veil Records. He did a collaboration with David Greenberger who puts out the Duplex Planet called Oh Pa that came out in late 2011. After 2009 he recorded and played gigs with his Ralph Carney's Serious Jass Project. A new record Seriously was issued in July 2011 on Smog Veil Records.

== Personal life ==
Carney's nephew Patrick Carney is the drummer for the rock band the Black Keys. The two collaborated on the theme music to the Netflix original series BoJack Horseman. A memorial tribute can be observed during the opening credits to the first episode of season 5.

His older brother, Jim Carney, is a retired reporter for the Akron Beacon Journal.

Carney died on December 17, 2017, at the age of 61, from head injuries sustained falling down steps in his home in Portland, Oregon, the previous day. He was survived by his daughter, Hedda, as well as his partner, Megan Hinchliffe.

== Discography ==
=== Solo albums ===
- Happiness Finally Came to Them (1987)
- Black Power (1994)
- Ralph Sounds (1997)
- I Like You (A Lot) (1999)
- This Is! Ralph Carney (2003)
- Ralph Carney's Serious Jass Project (2009)
- Seriously (Ralph Carney's Serious Jass Project) (2011)
- OH, PA (spoken word album with David Greenberger) (2011)
- Secret Language (with David Coulter) (2012)
- All at Once (with All Ones) (2016)
- Songs for Unsung Holidays (with Chris Butler) (2018)
