= Kramer (musician) =

American musician (born 1958)

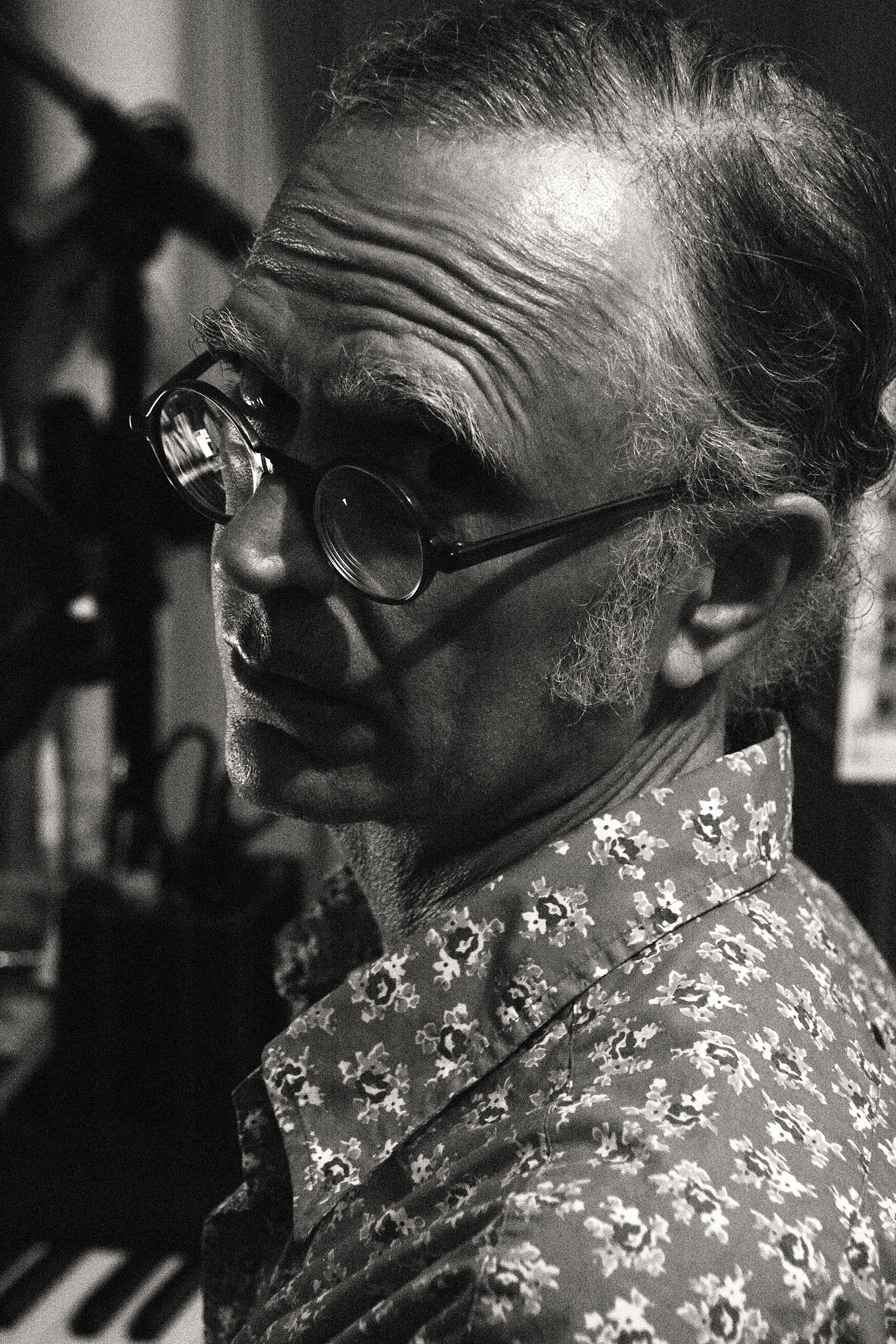
- Kramer in 2018

Background information
- Also known as: Mark Kramer, Bonner Kramer
- Born: Stephen Michael Bonner; November 30, 1958 (age 67); New York City, U.S.
- Occupations: Record producer, composer, music director
- Years active: 1978–present
- Labels: Shimmy-Disc, Shimmy-500
- Formerly of: Captain Howdy; Bongwater; Shockabilly; B.A.L.L.; Let It Come Down
- Website: Kramershimmy.com

Mark Kramer (born November 30, 1958, in New York City, United States), known professionally as Kramer, is a musician, composer, record producer and founder of the New York City record label Shimmy-Disc. He was a full-time member of the bands New York Gong, Shockabilly, B.A.L.L. and Bongwater; has played on tour (usually on bass guitar) with bands such as Butthole Surfers, Ween, Half Japanese and The Fugs (1984 reunion tour); and has performed regularly with John Zorn and other improvising musicians of New York City's "downtown scene" of the 1980s.

Kramer's work as a producer has been with bands such as Galaxie 500 (whose entire oeuvre he produced), Low (whom he discovered and produced), Half Japanese, White Zombie, Gwar, King Missile, Danielson Familie, Will Oldham, Daniel Johnston, and Urge Overkill, including their hit cover of "Girl, You'll Be a Woman Soon".

== Early music career ==
Kramer's first experience in the New York music scene came when he played in the band New York Gong, led by Daevid Allen, in 1979 and 1980. Kramer played organ on one song on their 1979 album About Time.

In 1980, Kramer joined the band The Chadbournes, led by Eugene Chadbourne, which also included David Licht, Tom Cora and John Zorn. They played together until Chadbourne, Kramer and Licht formed the band Shockabilly, which toured internationally from 1982 until 1985. The band dissolved while on a US tour early in 1985. That tour included a brief trip through Texas with the then-unknown Butthole Surfers. Forging a close friendship with co-founding Butthole Surfers members Gibby Haynes and Paul Leary, Kramer was available when the band needed to replace their bassist later that year. Kramer bought a Höfner Beatle bass and joined the Butthole Surfers for a string of shows in the US, and for the band's debut European tour in 1985. Prior to his purchase of Noise New York, he recorded several songs from the band's Rembrandt Pussy Horse LP there, including "Florida" and "Two Parter".

== Production and studio ==
After touring, Kramer took over a New York recording studio named Noise New York, using a loan of $5,000 from an uncle. The studio was to serve as a mainstay for artists and bands both local and international, and Kramer became one of the busiest indie music producers in New York City. The first recording at Noise New York was the Buttholes' rendition of "American Woman".

Kramer formed the record label Shimmy-Disc two years later in 1987 and enjoyed critical acclaim, releasing 105 albums before shutting down in 1999. Artists who recorded with Kramer at Noise New York or Noise New Jersey and released music on his label include King Missile, Gwar, Boredoms, Damon & Naomi, Daniel Johnston, Jad Fair, Tuli Kupferberg, B.A.L.L., Ween, Lida Husik, Uncle Wiggly, Hugh Hopper, and Daevid Allen.

The label remained a favorite at college radio stations throughout the 1980s and 1990s.

== Bongwater ==
In the early 1980s Kramer met Ann Magnuson, New York City performance artist, when he ran the sound for a band she was in, Pulsallama, during their frequent performances at Club 57. After Pulsallama disbanded in 1984, the two began to collaborate, and in 1986 they formed Bongwater. Together they released five LPs, including Double Bummer, and culminating with their 1991 swansong, The Big Sell-Out. In 1991 they began a romantic relationship while Kramer was separated from his estranged wife. After several months, Kramer decided to end the romantic relationship and reconcile with his wife, and the end of the relationship also spelled the end of the band. Several months later, Magnuson sued Kramer for $4.5 million for breach of contract, among other charges, and Kramer responded with a counter-suit. The subsequent legal battle resulted in the financial crippling of the Shimmy-Disc label, which never recovered. The lawsuits were eventually settled out of court in 1997 for undisclosed terms.

== Association with Penn & Teller ==
A pivotal moment in Kramer's early career came when Jad Fair of Half Japanese introduced him to Penn & Teller. Kramer soon found himself working eight shows per week as Sound Consultant on Penn & Teller's 1987 Broadway show, and composing the music for their Cruel Tricks for Dear Friends special. In 1992, Kramer formed the band the Captain Howdy with Penn Jillette, and together with guest artists Debbie Harry (of Blondie) and Billy West, they made two albums together, both released on Shimmy-Disc. Following Penn's permanent relocation to Las Vegas in 1997, the group disbanded.

== Collaboration with other artists ==
In 1988, Kramer and Jad Fair released the record Roll Out the Barrel together on Kramer's Shimmy-Disc label. They reunited in 1998 and published the record The Sound of Music. An Unfinished Symphony in 12 Parts that year. In 2020, they released their third collaboration, The History of Crying on Kramer's newly relaunched Shimmy-Disc label.

In 1990 Kramer first met the two-man band Ween when they played a show at a small New York club, the Pyramid Club. Kramer struck up a friendship with the two, who had already been fans of his Shimmy-Disc label. He signed them to Shimmy-Disc, and released their new double LP The Pod. In January 1992, Ween went on a brief tour of England with Kramer on bass and Claude Coleman Jr on drums, culminating with the recording of four songs from The Pod for a John Peel Session at the BBC.

In 2023, Shimmy-Disc released Kramer's duo collaboration with new-age pioneer Laraaji, entitled Baptismal, and a remixed and remastered double LP by Allen Ginsberg (originally produced by Hal Willner in 1989 as a single LP) titled The Lion For Real, re-titled for this re-release as The Lion For Real, Re-Born, featuring Marc Ribot, Arto Lindsay, Bill Frisell and many other musicians hand-picked by Willner. The double LP featured eight songs from the original recording sessions that were not included on the original 1989 LP, concluding with two 'undiscovered' poems set to music by Kramer himself.

Also in 2023, Shimmy-Disc released a six-EP limited-edition wooden box set of 7" vinyl featuring Britta Phillips (Luna), Paul Leary (Butthole Surfers), Rob Crow (Pinback), Jad Fair (Half Japanese) and Danielson, and David Grubbs (Gastr Del Sol).

In 2024, Shimmy-Disc released Kramer's collaborations with Pan American entitled Reverberations of Non-Stop Traffic on Redding Road, and with Japanese composer Kato Hideki entitled The Walk, the latter having been inspired by the writings of Swiss prose master Robert Walser and Japanese Haiku master Basho. Both LPs' jackets featured photography by Rudy Royston. Among his numerous forthcoming collaborations for Shimmy-Disc are a spoken-word+music LP of poems by Edgar Allan Poe featuring Joan As Police Woman, Thurston Moore, Teller, Anne Waldman, Lydia Lunch and others, and the debut LP from his newest live trio Squanderers, with David Grubbs and Wendy Eisenberg.

== Changes in ownership of studio and record label ==
In 1992, Kramer sold his Noise New York recording studio and moved just across the Hudson River, where he had found a house going into foreclosure with a state-of-the-art 24-track recording studio built in. He dubbed the studio Noise New Jersey, and continued to produce recordings there, including, most famously, Urge Overkill's cover of "Girl, You'll Be a Woman Soon".

Shortly following the sale of Shimmy-Disc and his recording facility to the Knitting Factory in 1998 (in which he was contracted to play a continuing role in the label as producer and Director of A&R), Kramer sued the Knitting Factory for breach of contract and soon found himself without a creative base for the first time in his professional career. This experience left him emotionally devastated and looking to exit the music business.

== Film and theater ==
Kramer turned to his lifelong passion in film and theater, and in late 2000, he began studying directing under film and stage director Arthur Penn, whom he had met in 1989 when Penn directed Penn & Teller Get Killed. Kramer spent the better part of four years at New York's Actors Studio, where, in addition to learning directing, he did sound design and music for various productions at the Actors Studio Free Theater on 42nd street. This phase of Kramer's career culminated in 2002 when he composed the music for Fortune's Fool, the Tony Award-winning Broadway play directed by Arthur Penn. Kramer had been appointed assistant director on Arthur Penn's next Broadway play (Sly Fox) when his mother Rosalyn was stricken with a debilitating stroke, which drew him to Florida in 2003. She died 16 months later.

== Work with the James Randi Educational Foundation ==
After moving to the Fort Lauderdale area, Kramer worked for the James Randi Educational Foundation from 2004 until February 2006. His main job was to manage the foundation's One Million Dollar Paranormal Challenge. Kramer also maintained the foundation's video library and oversaw the digital transfer of over 700 archival VHS tapes to DVD, comprising the most complete document of the life and career of James Randi.

== Recent activities ==
Kramer is associated with the formation of the slowcore movement because of his production work for Low and Galaxie 500.

From 2003 to 2023, Kramer operated a private CD/LP mastering and mixing studio in Florida. In 2006, he announced the return of his record company under the name Second-Shimmy. The debut release in October 2006 was I Killed the Monster - 21 Artists Performing the Songs by Daniel Johnston, featuring performances by Dot Allison, Fair & Kramer, Daniel Smith & Sufjan Stevens, Kimya Dawson, R. Stevie Moore, Major Matt Mason USA, Jeff Lewis, Mike Watt, and many others. The label released five CDs and ceased operations.

In 2006, Kramer produced Exaltation of Larks, a solo release from Dot Allison for which he acted as arranger and played most of the instruments. The LP was released in September 2007 on Cooking Vinyl in the UK and P-Vine in Japan.

Kramer premiered his composition "Things to Come" in Tokyo in 2007. Hoping to perform the piece annually, he performed it in Tel Aviv in 2008, Melbourne in 2009 and Paris in 2010. In January 2008, Kramer toured 14 cities in 14 days in Japan with Mike Watt and Samm Bennett in a dueling bass trio named Brother's Sister's Daughter.

In 2012 Kramer released The Brill Building on John Zorn's Tzadik label, an album of cover songs written in the Brill Building in the early 1960s. In 2017, Tzadik followed that release with Kramer's The Brill Building, Book Two, featuring guitar performances by Bill Frisell.

In January 2020, Kramer was named one of the 12 curators of the Joyful Noise Recordings White Label Series, with David Lynch, Lydia Lunch, Son Lux and others. On April 29, 2020, Joyful Noise Recordings also named Kramer its 2020 Artist-in-Residence, and simultaneously announced a new partnership with Kramer for the rebirth of his Shimmy-Disc label. The first release by the label was from Let It Come Down, Kramer's recording project with U.K. vocalist Xan Tyler. Their debut LP, titled Songs We Sang in Our Dreams, was released on June 12, 2020. The A.I.R. series culminated in a five-LP box set of Kramer projects.

The A.I.R. box also includes Words and Music, Kramer's spoken-word LP in which he sets music to the voices of poets and writers as diverse as Allen Ginsberg, Gregory Corso, Terry Southern, Tina May Hall, Christine Schutt, Scott McClanahan and others, and his first full-length 'ambient cinema' releases, Music for Pianos and Sunflowers, and Music for Films Edited by Moths, collaborating with Dutch multi-disciplinary artist Tinca Veerman on a series of videos for each piece of music. Another collaboration with Tinca Veerman followed in 2024, when he was commissioned by her to compose the music for her Amsterdam installation at De Hallen, "We Are Passengers".

In November 2021, Kramer released And The Wind Blew It All Away (his first solo LP of original songs since 1998's Songs From The Pink Death). All of the performances were recorded alone in his Florida studio.

In 2022, Kramer re-mixed the first demos recorded in 1994 by Josh Haden for his band Spain, and released them on Shimmy-Disc as World Of Blue, featuring many of the songs eventually included on Spain's debut LP, The Blue Moods of Spain.

As a filmmaker, Kramer has created over 60 music videos and short films he refers to as 'Ambient-Cinema', following his lifelong quest to bring quiet music and cinema into a single artform.

As of January 2023, Kramer lives in a small town near Asheville, North Carolina, where he continues his activities as a composer/producer and maintains a modest recording/mixing/mastering facility in his home.

== Discography ==
- The Guilt Trip (1992)
- The Secret of Comedy (1994)
- Let Me Explain Something to You About Art (1998)
- Songs from the Pink Death (1998)
- The Greenberg Variations (2003)
- The Brill Building (2012)
- The Brill Building, Book Two (2017), with Bill Frisell
- Songs We Sang In Our Dreams (2020), with Let It Come Down
- Music for Pianos and Sunflowers (2021)
- Words and Music (2021)
- And The Wind Blew It All Away (2021)
- Music for Films Edited by Moths (2022)
- Interior of an Edifice Under the Sea (2025), with Pan American
- ...And the Crimson Moon Whispers Goodbye (2025)
- They Came Like Swallows – Seven Requiems for the Children of Gaza (2026), with Thurston Moore
