= Shimmy-Disc =

American record label

Shimmy-Disc is a New York City–based independent record label founded in 1987 by Mark Kramer. Before it was sold to the Knitting Factory, artists such as Bongwater, Daniel Johnston, Low, Fly Ashtray, Galaxie 500, King Missile, Boredoms, Ruins, Ween, Gwar, The Semibeings, and Uncle Wiggly recorded on the label. Label founder, Kramer, also has production credits on records by Half Japanese, White Zombie, Yo La Tengo, John Zorn, Jon Spencer Blues Explosion, memorable parts of the Pulp Fiction soundtrack, the Butthole Surfers and many others (some of whom he toured with or otherwise performed alongside). The label also released compilation albums such as Rutles Highway Revisited (A Tribute To The Rutles), 1990, which featured various artists from the label, and also introduced new artists such as Paleface.

In 2020, Kramer revived the Shimmy-Disc label in partnership with Joyful Noise Recordings in conjunction with their artist-in-residence series. Since then the label has released a slew of new records by Paul Leary (of Butthole Surfers), J.D. Pinkus (of Butthole Surfers and Melvins), Hunter S. Thompson, remastered and unreleased material from Daniel Johnston, Bruce Haack, Allen Ginsberg, Edgar Allan Poe (featuring Thurston Moore and Lydia Lunch), Laraaji and others.

== Shimmy Disc Video Compilation V.1 ==
Shimmy Disc Video Compilation V.1

Video by Gwar, Bongwater, King Missile, Paleface, others
- Released: 1988
- Recorded: 1986–1988
- Genre: Punk rock
- Length: 120 min
- Label: Shimmy-Disc
- Producer: Kramer

Gwar, Bongwater, King Missile, Paleface, others chronology
''Shimmy Disc Video Compilation V.1'' (1988)	Rawgwar (1990)

Shimmy Disc Video Compilation V.1 was the first official video release to feature Gwar. This compilation included several other bands on the Shimmy-Disc label.

== Track listing ==
1. "Lesbians of Russia" (Bongwater)
2. "Jimmy" (Bongwater)
3. "The Box" (King Missile)
4. "Take Stuff from Work" (King Missile)
5. "Dominique" (When People Were Shorter and Lived Near the Water)
6. "This Guy's in Love" (When People Were Shorter and Lived Near the Water)
7. "Bird" (B.A.L.L.)
8. "Out of the Blue" (B.A.L.L)
9. "Tugboat" (Galaxie 500)
10. "Hymn" (Tuli Kupferberg)
11. "Maybe" (Spongehead)
12. "Hot Dog" (Michael Cudahy)
13. "Shaft" (Velvet Monkeys)
14. "Rock Party" (Velvet Monkeys)
15. "Sex Gorilla" (Dogbowl)
16. "Daytime" (Dogbowl)
17. "What Makes Donna Twirl?" (Midget Planets)
18. "Ain't No Crime to be Stupid" (Mr. Elk and Mr. Seal)
19. "Life's a Gas" (Shockabilly)
20. "Pile Up All Architecture" (Shockabilly)
21. "Gwar Theme" (Gwar)
22. "Time For Death" (Gwar)

== See also ==
- Shimmy Disc discography
- List of record labels
