= Happy 14½ =

EP by King Missile
- Released: 1992
- Genre: Avant-garde
- Length: 14:30
- Label: Atlantic
- Producer: Kramer, King Missile

Happy 14½ is an EP by the American avant-garde band King Missile. It was released in 1992, shortly before the band's album Happy Hour. The EP was intended for promotional use only, and not supposed to be sold; nonetheless, copies are sometimes available in "used" sections of record stores because some people who received the EP sold it anyway.

Just as Happy Hour is approximately one hour long, Happy 14½ is approximately 14½ minutes in length.

== Track listing ==
All lyrics by John S. Hall (except "All Things Everywhere," by Chris Xefos).

1. "Martin Scorsese (PG-13)" – 2:48
  - This track is the "clean" version of "Martin Scorsese" from Happy Hour. In the "PG-13" version, Hall omits the original's 13 instances of the expletive fuck but does not edit the original's violent content.
2. "Detachable Penis" – 3:21
  - This track also appears on Happy Hour.
3. "Nietzsche Sneezes" – 3:27
4. "All Things Everywhere" – 2:47
  - These two tracks appear exclusively on this release.
5. "The Bunny Song" [live] – 1:57
  - The studio version of this track appears on the 1988 album They.

== Personnel ==
- John S. Hall – lead vocals (except on "All Things Everywhere")
- Dave Rick – guitars
- Chris Xefos – bass guitar, keyboards, backing vocals, lead vocals on "All Things Everywhere"
- Roger Murdock – drums, percussion
