= Love Is... (song) =

Single by King Missile

from the album King Missile
- Released: 1994
- Genre: Avant-garde, doom metal
- Length: 3:38
- Label: Atlantic
- Songwriter(s): John S. Hall, Roger Murdock, Dave Rick, Chris Xefos
- Producer(s): Daniel Rey

King Missile singles chronology
"Martin Scorsese" (1993)	"Love Is..." (1994)	"America Kicks Ass" (2004)

"Love Is..." is a song by avant-garde band King Missile. It was the only single from the band's 1994 album King Missile.

== Content ==
In "Love Is...," a dirge-like track with elements of doom metal, frontman John S. Hall dryly recites several examples of what love is ("beautiful / Like birds that sing") and is not ("ugly / Like rats / In a puddle of vomit"). The chorus consists of Hall ominously chanting, "Love is beautiful."

== Maxi-single ==
The "Love Is..." maxi-single was intended for promotional use only, and not supposed to be sold; nonetheless, copies are sometimes available in "used" sections of record stores, because some people who received the maxi-single sold it anyway.

=== Track listing ===
All lyrics by Hall. All music by Roger Murdock, Dave Rick, and Chris Xefos.

1. "Love Is..." [clean version] – 3:38
  - This "clean" version is identical to the album version except for the partial muting of a word that the King Missile liner notes claim is "shipload" but may actually be "shitload." (According to Hall, "on the [King Missile] lyric sheet we [the band] submitted to Atlantic, we changed all the curse words to acceptable words, figuring nobody would listen to the record, and we [would] get away with not having a warning label. This actually worked!")
2. "These People" – 4:26
  - This track also appears on King Missile.
3. "Lost Land" – 4:32
  - This track appears exclusively on the maxi-single.
4. "What If" [alternate version] – 2:24
  - This track, which appears exclusively on the maxi-single, differs from the King Missile version of "What If" in that the lyrics are spoken throughout rather than both spoken and sung.
5. "Love Is..." [album version] – 3:38

== Music video ==
The video for "Love Is..." was directed by Richard Kern. The video contrasts shots of the band performing in a white room with shots of a dark, sordid party at which attendees engage in heterosexual, homosexual, interracial and zoophilic partnerships.

MTV refused to air the video. Hall believes this rejection was motivated by the shots of multi-instrumentalist Xefos kissing another man.
