= America Kicks Ass =

Single by King Missile

from the album Royal Lunch
- Released: 2004
- Genre: Avant-garde metal
- Length: 3:11
- Label: Important Records
- Songwriters: Sasha Forte, John S. Hall, Bradford Reed
- Producer: Bradford Reed

King Missile singles chronology
"Love Is..." (1994)	"America Kicks Ass" (2004)

"America Kicks Ass" is a song by avant-garde band King Missile. It was the only single from the band's 2004 album Royal Lunch.

== Content ==
In "America Kicks Ass," frontman John S. Hall, backed by an ominous string section and sporadic bursts of white noise, assumes the persona of an enraged American aggressively in favor of American jingoism and militarism. Hall screams the lyrics, including such sentiments as:

America totally kicks ass. Strongest nation on Earth. Nobody can kick our ass.... And we're not really criminals, because there's no international law. No international law, because there's no international courts. And there are no international courts because we refuse to recognize any court that might ever try to stop us from doing whatever the fuck we want.... We don't have to justify ourselves. We don't have to tell the rest of the world shit. We do whatever the fuck we want for one reason, and one reason only: because we can.

The lyrics satirize this jingoistic mindset.

== Reception ==
Music critic Robert Christgau named "America Kicks Ass" a "Choice Cut" in his August 3, 2004 Consumer Guide.
