= My Heart Is a Flower =

Single by King Missile

from the album The Way to Salvation
- B-side: "Various Remixes of the track"
- Released: 1991
- Genre: Avant-garde, pop rock, psychedelic rock
- Length: 2:36
- Label: Atlantic
- Songwriter(s): John S. Hall, Dave Rick
- Producer(s): King Missile, Lou Giordano

King Missile singles chronology
"Jesus Was Way Cool" (1990)	"My Heart Is a Flower" (1991)	"Detachable Penis" (1992)

"My Heart Is a Flower" is a song by avant-garde band King Missile. It was the only single from the band's 1991 album The Way to Salvation.

== Content ==
In "My Heart Is a Flower," a pop rock track with elements of psychedelic rock, frontman John S. Hall repeatedly sings the titular phrase, recites a short monologue expanding on the heart-as-flower metaphor, then returns to singing the titular phrase as the music crescendoes.

In an interview circa 1992, Hall explained his inspiration for the song as follows:

...[W]hen I really, really feel very bad, what I want to do is make myself feel better, so I'll write something happier. 'My Heart Is a Flower' is really a funny song. I was very, very sad when I wrote that one and a lot of people find that surprising. But I felt really, really trampled on, like a flower that's been thrown down in the dirt, when I wrote that.

== Music video ==
The video for "My Heart Is a Flower" was directed by Phil Morrison. During the parts of the video that accompany the sung sections of the song, the band performs in a large, colorful garden, with multi-instrumentalist Chris Xefos often playing in a bear costume. During the part of the video that accompanies the spoken section, Hall plays chutes and ladders in a dimly lit room with a woman played by Juliana Hatfield. The woman flosses her teeth before narrowly avoiding a kiss from Hall.
