= Martin Scorsese (song) =

Single by King Missile

from the album Happy Hour
- Released: 1993
- Genre: Avant-garde, noise rock
- Length: 1:57
- Label: Atlantic
- Songwriters: John S. Hall, Roger Murdock, Dave Rick, Chris Xefos
- Producers: Kramer, Steve Watson, King Missile

King Missile singles chronology
"(Why Are We) Trapped?" (1993)	"Martin Scorsese" (1993)	"Love Is..." (1994)

"Martin Scorsese" is a song by avant-garde band King Missile, about the film director of the same name. It was the third and final single from the band's 1992 album Happy Hour.

== Content ==
=== "Clean" version ===
A "clean" version of the song, dubbed "Martin Scorsese (PG-13)," was made for radio and video play. In the "PG-13" version, Hall omits the original's thirteen instances of the expletive fuck but does not edit the original's hyperbolically violent content. This version is available on the Happy 14½ EP.

== Music video ==
The video for "Martin Scorsese (PG-13)" was directed by George Seminara, and shot exclusively in black-and-white. In the video, Hall, dressed like a prototypical Scorsese criminal character, frantically yells the lyrics into a microphone while the other band members sit or stand at their instruments but do not play them. Throughout the video, photographs of Scorsese and ransom note–style titles of his films appear.

The video was featured in an episode of the television series Beavis and Butt-head.

== Interpretations ==
"Martin Scorsese" has been subject to a wide array of interpretations. Some people think that Hall is paying tribute to Scorsese by using the copious violence and profanity that are trademarks of the director. Others take Hall's use of these tools as a statement that Scorsese lacks creativity. Still others see the song as a message that exposure to profuse violence and profanity in films such as Scorsese's may lead viewers to become violent and profane themselves.
