= The Box (King Missile song) =

Single by King Missile

from the album They
- Released: 1988
- Recorded: 1988
- Genre: Avant-garde
- Length: 2:50
- Label: Shimmy Disc
- Songwriter(s): Dogbowl, John S. Hall
- Producer(s): Kramer

King Missile singles chronology
"Take Stuff from Work" (1987)	"The Box" (1988)	"No Point" (1990)

"The Box" is a song by avant-garde band King Missile. It appears on the band's 1988 album They.

== Content ==
In "The Box," frontman John S. Hall sings a story in which a male subject is placed in a box, given various toys to play with, instructed to be creative, and told that he will be let out of the box if he follows his instructions. Although the subject performs his assigned tasks "incredibly well," his captors do not let him out of the box. As the music crescendoes, Hall repeatedly screams, "They lie!"

The lyrics may be an allegory for the way some children are cheated by the American educational system.

== Music video ==
The video for "The Box" was directed for $100 by Winchester Chimes.
