= Mystical Shit =

Studio album by King Missile
- Released: 1990
- Studio: Noise New York (New York City, New York)
- Genre: Alternative rock; comedy rock
- Length: 46:51
- Label: Shimmy Disc
- Producer: Mark Kramer

King Missile chronology
They (1988)	Mystical Shit (1990)	The Way to Salvation (1991)

Mystical Shit is the third studio album by experimental music band King Missile, released in 1990 by Shimmy Disc. It is the first of their albums to be recorded after guitarist Dave Rick and bassist Chris Xefos had joined and composer Stephen Tunney had departed the group to form Dogbowl. The album was first issued on vinyl record in 1990 and was later included on the compilation album Mystical Shit & Fluting on the Hump.

== Reception ==
Professional ratings
Review scores
Source	Rating
AllMusic	3.5/5 stars
The Village Voice	B

Stewart Mason of AllMusic called Mystical Shit "a transitional album" and said "Dogbowl had decamped for a solo career and King Missile was firmly in Hall's hands; as a result, the album is much less musically interesting, the songs consisting of little more than noodly jams underneath Hall's surreal, often funny monologues. Mason said the album was "weaker than both its predecessors and King Missile's later career high point, Happy Hour, where Hall would finally regain the proper balance between music and lyrics." Richard Gehr commended Hall for "spearheading New York's electric poetry movement" and said "the revamped King Missile sounds more focused than before, with the humor coming off as conceptual rather than jokey. Robert Christgau chose the track "Jesus Was Way Cool", by Hall and bassist Chris Xefos, as the album's "choice cut".

== Track listing ==
All lyrics are written by John S. Hall, except "Love You More" by Pete Shelley.

Side one
No.	Title	Music	Length
1.	"Title Track"	John S. Hall; Dave Rick; traditional	3:09
2.	"Rock-n-roll Will Never Die"	Hall; Chris Xefos	1:55
3.	"No Point"	Hall; Rick	3:35
4.	"Gary & Melissa"	Hall; Rick	2:18
5.	"Frightened & Freezing"	Hall; Xefos	2:09
6.	"How to Remember Your Dreams"	Hall; Stephen Tunney	3:07
7.	"The Fish That Played the Ponies"	Hall; Rick	2:36
8.	"Jesus Was Way Cool"	Hall; Xefos	2:42

Side two
No.	Title	Music	Length
1.	"Open"	Freeman; Hall; traditional	4:36
2.	"The Sandbox"	Hall; Rick	1:45
3.	"The Neither World"	Hall; Tunney	3:36
4.	"She Didn't Want"	Hall; Rick	2:48
5.	"Cheesecake Truck"	Hall; Rick	1:11
6.	"Equivalencies"	Hall; Rick	3:14
7.	"Love You More" (Buzzcocks cover)	Pete Shelley	1:46
8.	"Forthly"	Hall; Xefos	3:24

== Personnel ==
Adapted from the Mystical Shit liner notes.

King Missile

- Steve Dansiger – drums, percussion
- John S. Hall – lead vocals, flute (A4), harmonica (B3)
- Dave Rick – guitar, backing vocals
- Chris Xefos – bass guitar, piano, organ, synthesizer, accordion, tuba, backing vocals

Production and design

- Mark Kramer – production, engineering, mixing

== Release history ==
Region	Date	Label	Format	Catalog
United States	1990	Shimmy Disc	CS, LP	shimmy 029
Netherlands	1990	Shimmy Disc	LP	SDE 9016
