= This Fuckin' Guy =

EP by King Missile IV
- Released: March 15, 2015
- Studio: Victory Way Studios (Burbank, California)
- Genre: Electronic
- Length: 18:43
- Label: Powertool
- Producer: Dan West

King Missile IV chronology
Royal Lunch (2004)	This Fuckin' Guy (2015)

This Fuckin' Guy is a concept EP by King Missile IV, released by Powertool Records on March 10, 2015. The album came to be after King Missile had toured with American band LoveyDove whose two members, Azalia Snail and Dan West, joined vocalist John S. Hall in the making of the album.

== Concept ==
The album is a collection of poetic texts about the beauty of the world's landscapes narrated by a character known as The Fuckin' Guy. He comments what he sees and how he feels about it while swearing and cursing non-stop. There are barely any lines in the EP without a curse word. The settings are mostly in the New York area.

== Blog ==
The character of The Fuckin' Guy was created by John S. Hall in 2014 in a blogspot account named This Fckin' Blog. It contains other texts on other subjects in the same style. The blog went on hiatus a couple of months after the release of the EP, and resumed shortly after Donald Trump assumed the presidency.

== Track listing ==
All lyrics are written by John S. Hall; all music is composed by Azalia Snail and Dan West.

No.	Title	Length
1.	"Closet"	4:15
2.	"Bike"	3:13
3.	"Sunset"	2:37
4.	"Stars"	3:05
5.	"Moon"	1:58
6.	"River"	3:35

== Personnel ==
Adapted from the This Fuckin' Guy liner notes.

King Missile

- John S. Hall – lead vocals
- Azalia Snail – omnichord, percussion, backing vocals
- Dan West – bass guitar, guitar, effects, backing vocals

Production and design

- Mark Chalecki – mastering

== Release history ==
Region	Date	Label	Format	Catalog
United States	2015	Powertool	CD	PT156
