= No Point =

Single by King Missile

from the album Mystical Shit
- Released: 1990
- Genre: Avant-garde, psychedelic rock
- Length: 3:35
- Label: Shimmy Disc
- Songwriters: John S. Hall, Dave Rick
- Producer: Kramer

King Missile singles chronology
"The Box" (1988)	"No Point" (1990)	"Jesus Was Way Cool" (1990)

"No Point" is a song by avant-garde band King Missile. It appears on the band's 1990 album Mystical Shit.

== Content ==
In "No Point," a psychedelic rock track with prominent lead guitar, frontman John S. Hall sings a list of states and activities to which "there is no point." The list includes answering the telephone, opening the mail, using drugs, not using drugs, and life and death themselves.

In the liner notes of the compilation Mystical Shit & Fluting on the Hump, Hall writes of "No Point":

These lyrics were taken from a novel I started writing but never finished, about a guy who decides to never leave his apartment due to extreme depression. In the novel Elliot, the protagonist, writes a quasi-suicide note to Eliot, the narrator. That letter is the words to this song.

== Music video ==
The video for "No Point" was directed for $1200 by Benton Bainbridge. In the video, Hall plays a "seeker" who is repeatedly visited in his bedroom by an enigmatic "seer," played by Andrea Cook. The seer presents the seeker with an assortment of objects, such as an alarm clock, a jacket, and a wind-up toy, which he invariably throws out his window and onto the sidewalk below, on which the other members of King Missile are playing. In between visits from the seer, the seeker uses a crystal ball to view various mystical and/or psychedelic images. At the end of the video, the seer appears to have achieved some form of enlightenment.

Hall thinks the video "sucked."
