= The Way to Salvation =

Studio album by King Missile
- Released: April 16, 1991
- Recorded: January 1991
- Studio: Fort Apache Studios (Cambridge, New York)
- Genre: Alternative rock; comedy rock
- Length: 46:44
- Label: Atlantic
- Producer: Lou Giordano; John S. Hall; David Ramirez; Dave Rick; Chris Xefos

King Missile chronology
Mystical Shit (1990)	The Way to Salvation (1991)	Happy Hour (1992)

The Way to Salvation is the fourth studio album by experimental music band King Missile, released on April 16, 1991, by Atlantic Records. The band's previous drummer Steve Dansiger parted from the band before recording began and his position was filled by Hypnolovewheel drummer David Ramirez.

== Reception ==
Professional ratings
Review scores
Source	Rating
AllMusic	3/5 stars
The Village Voice	A−

Ned Raggett of AllMusic said "The Way to Salvation is enjoyable enough but lacks a final killer touch and "having Lou Giordano on production instead of Kramer is also a bit disconcerting -- he's a great producer, of course, but the crisp focus that he brings takes away from the warmer feel of Kramer's work on the earlier records." However, the critic said "much of the core fun that King Missile brings to the table stays intact: Hall's blissfully funny lyrics and shaggy-dog stories, the group's collective hops and skips through a variety of musical styles, and a generally upbeat vibe." Trouser Press commended the "strong musical ideas caroming between Rick and Xefos" as "loosely structured soundtrackery as verse/chorus song form — are custom built for Hall." Robert Christgau commended the production and spoken word performances, saying "it isn't just the consistency of the sarcasm that distinguishes this one from Mystical Shit", "it's the way he's putting his hard-rock comedy, shaggy dog fables, and sophistical shit across."

== Track listing ==
All lyrics are written by John S. Hall, except "Betrayal Takes Two" by Richard Hell.

No.	Title	Music	Length
1.	"The Way to Salvation"	John S. Hall; Dave Rick	2:07
2.	"Life"	Hall; David Ramirez; Rick; Chris Xefos	4:04
3.	"The Boy Who Ate Lasagna and Could Jump Over a Church"	Hall; Rick	1:34
4.	"The Story of Willy"	Hall; Ramirez; Xefos	2:25
5.	"Dinosaurs"	Hall; Rick; Xefos	3:26
6.	"I Wish"	Hall; Rick	2:33
7.	"The Indians"	Hall	1:41
8.	"It's"	Hall; Ramirez; Rick; Xefos	5:07
9.	"My Heart Is a Flower"	Hall; Rick	2:38
10.	"Pickaxe"	Ramirez; Rick; Xefos	2:30
11.	"Sex With You"	Hall; Rick	3:37
12.	"Part Two"	Hall; Rick	2:13
13.	"Betrayal Takes Two" (Richard Hell cover)	Ivan Julian; Richard Meyers	3:11
14.	"Listen to Me"	Hall; Ramirez; Rick	2:30
15.	"Come Closer"	Hall; Xefos	3:01
16.	"Scotland"	Hall	1:10
17.	"To Walk Among the Pigs"	Hall; Rick	2:55

== Personnel ==
Adapted from the liner notes of The Way to Salvation.

King Missile

- John S. Hall – lead vocals, production, percussion (16)
- David Ramirez – drums, percussion, production
- Dave Rick – guitar, production
- Chris Xefos – bass guitar, keyboards, percussion, production, production coordinator, mixing

Additional performers

- Toaz Junior High School Boys' Choir – backing vocals (1, 6)

Production and design

- Greg Calbi – mastering
- Lou Giordano – production, engineering, mixing
- G.B. Irmiger – illustrations
- Matt Lane – assistant mixing
- Macioce – photography
- Mighty Management – management
- Marc Nathan – executive-producer
- Carl Plaster – assistant engineering
- Jodi Rovin – art direction

== Release history ==
Region	Date	Label	Format	Catalog
United States	1991	Atlantic	CD, LP	7567-82208
Germany	1991	Atlantic	CD, LP	7567-82208
