= The Psychopathology of Everyday Life (album) =

Studio album by King Missile
- Released: January 21, 2003
- Recorded: Ft. Lb. Studio
- Genre: Art rock; alternative rock
- Length: 43:26
- Label: Instinct Records
- Producer: Bradford Reed

King Missile chronology
Failure (1998)	The Psychopathology of Everyday Life (2003)	Royal Lunch (2004)

The Psychopathology of Everyday Life is the eighth album by avant-garde band King Missile. It was released on January 21, 2003 by Instinct Records. The album is named after a 1901 book by Sigmund Freud. The album cover features a mock Parental Advisory label that reads, "Warning: Contains lots of curses: Do not buy!"

== Reception ==
Professional ratings
Review scores
Source	Rating
Allmusic	4/5 stars

Johnny Loftus of AllMusic awarded The Psychopathology of Everyday Life four out of five stars and said, "Highlights include 'JLH,' in which Hall commends Jennifer Love Hewitt for not speaking out against war, politics, or 9/11" and "'Eating People' sets up the classic King Missile paradox, in which the listener is at once repulsed with Hall's logic, while being impressed that he's so convincing."

== Track listing ==
All lyrics are written by John S. Hall; all music is composed by Bradford Reed, Charles Curtis, Sasha Forte and John S. Hall, except "Jesus Was Way Cool" by Chris Xefos.

No.	Title	Length
1.	"My Father"	3:25
2.	"Pain Series (1): Hot Coffee"	0:44
3.	"Damned If I Know"	3:05
4.	"JLH"	1:07
5.	"Pain Series (2): Hammer Thumb"	0:23
6.	"The President"	2:57
7.	"The Miracle of Childbirth"	4:20
8.	"Chickens"	2:31
9.	"Pain Series (3): Paper Cut"	0:24
10.	"Domestic Life"	4:25
11.	"Ennui"	1:23
12.	"Eating People"	4:08
13.	"Pain Series (4): Cold Pool"	0:25
14.	"Hamsters"	2:44
15.	"Give Me a Dollar"	3:52
16.	"Pain Series (5): Stomach Cramps"	0:31
17.	"Jim"	4:04
18.	"Jesus Was Way Cool" (Millennium Edition)	2:58

== Personnel ==
Adapted from the liner notes of The Psychopathology of Everyday Life.

King Missile

- Bradford Reed – drums, synthesizers, samples, piano, pencilina, percussion, backing vocals, production, recording, mixing
- Sasha Forte – bass guitar, violin, guitar, keyboards, backing vocals
- John S. Hall – lead vocals

Production and design

- Fly – cover art, illustrations
- Miguel Mateus – mastering

== Release history ==
Region	Date	Label	Format	Catalog
United States	2003	Instinct	CD	INS614
