= R. B. Korbet =

American musician

R.B. Korbet
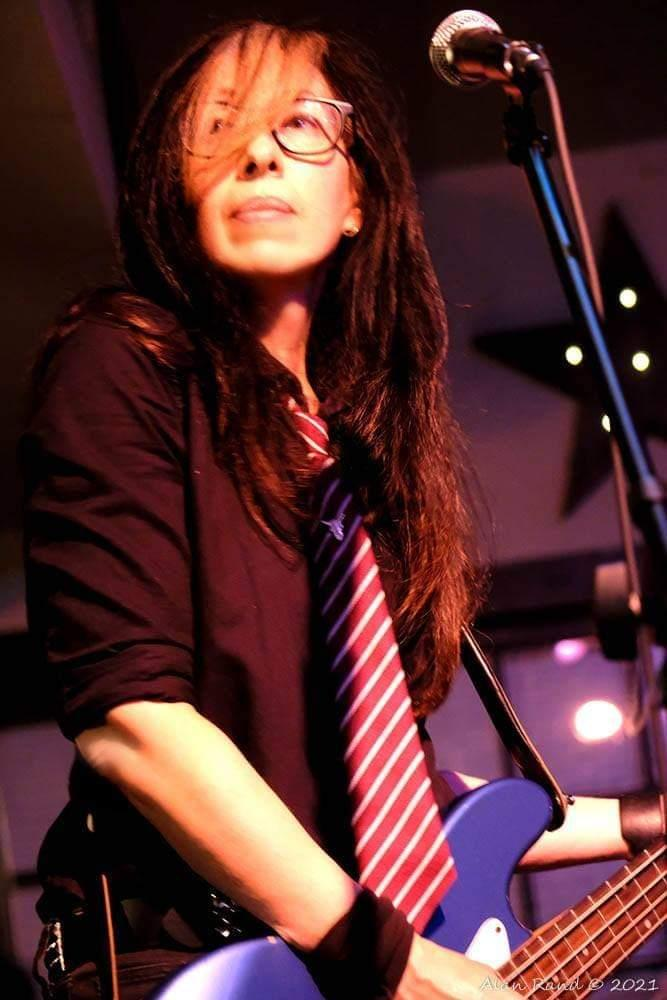

Background information
- Born: Rebecca Korbet; Manhattan, New York City, USA
- Genres: Punk rock, hardcore punk, industrial, garage rock, noise rock, art rock, experimental
- Instruments: Bass guitar, drums, guitar, percussion, vocals
- Years active: 1981–present
- Label: Shimmy Disc
- Member of: Highly Effective People, Silk Cut, King Missile (Dog Fly Religion),
- Formerly of: Big Stick, Bush Tetras, The Carvels NYC, Even Worse, Missing Foundation, Pussy Galore, The Wharton Tiers Ensemble

R.B. Korbet (born Rebecca Bronwyn Korbet) is an American musician. She is perhaps most well known for her contributing drumming and vocals to the first incarnation of art rock band King Missile, and was a member of Bush Tetras, having joined them on bass guitar in 2020.

After first joining Even Worse as lead vocalist in 1981, Korbet would go on to play guitar or bass and sing in bands such as Chop Shop, Hit by a Truck, Missing Foundation, Pussy Galore, Big Stick, Navigator, Madgodz, Bubba Zanetti, Sloth, Hellvis, the Floyds of Flatbush, The Wharton Tiers Ensemble, Judas Livingston Seagull, Verona Downs, and Um.

From 2019 to 2022, she played bass and sang backups with the Carvels NYC. In the duo Silk Cut, with King Missile's John S. Hall, she plays all instruments (except ukulele) and produces their recordings.

In 2020, Korbet contributed the track "The Power Broker" to Marc Sloan's compilation project Reel to Real Vol. 1. She also joined Bush Tetras the same year, brought in by the late Dee Pop. Several months after Pop's death in October 2021, she rallied for Sonic Youth drummer Steve Shelley to join the band, and subsequently appeared on their 2023 album They Live in My Head. In 2021, Korbet started another project, a trio called Highly Effective People, in which she writes all of the music, plays bass and sings, as well as creates their videos and other artwork. In 2024 Korbet was interviewed by music historian Jesse Rifkin for Walk on the Wild Side NYC.

== Personal life ==
Korbet was born in Manhattan to two artist parents, but was raised by her grandparents, who moved her to the suburbs of Detroit in 1972. Upon returning to New York in 1980, she became involved with the punk and hardcore scenes and later joined (what would become) the most well-known lineup of Even Worse, which was documented on the compilation album New York Thrash.

After nearly two decades in New York City, Korbet relocated to Berkeley, California in early 1998, following the death of a close friend and fellow musician. Afterwards she spent three years in San Francisco, then LA, then Boston/Cambridge. After moving to the UK in 2003, she took a complete break from music in 2008 to focus on academic pursuits in the field of politics and history, and has since completed a BA at University of Westminster and a PhD through the Institute of Contemporary British History at King's College London.

== Selected discography ==
Artist	Release	Record label	Release year
Even Worse	New York Thrash (compilation)	ROIR	1982
King Missile (Dog Fly Religion)	Fluting on the Hump	Shimmy Disc	1987
King Missile (Dog Fly Religion)	They	Shimmy Disc	1988
Hellvis	The Frog E.P.	Fat Bastard	1994
Wharton Tiers	Brighter than Life	Atavistic Records	1996
The Wharton Tiers Ensemble	Twilight of the Computer Age	Atavistic Records	1999
Even Worse	You've Ruined Everything (archival release)	Grand Theft Audio	2002
Bush Tetras	They Live in My Head	Wharf Cat Records	2023
