= Jesus Was Way Cool =

Single by King Missile

from the album Mystical Shit
- Released: 1990
- Genre: Avant-garde; spoken word; pop
- Length: 2:42
- Label: Shimmy Disc
- Songwriter(s): John S. Hall, Chris Xefos
- Producer(s): Kramer

King Missile singles chronology
"No Point" (1990)	"Jesus Was Way Cool" (1990)	"My Heart Is a Flower" (1991)

"Jesus Was Way Cool" is a song by avant-garde band King Missile. It appears on the band's 1990 album Mystical Shit.

== Content ==
In "Jesus Was Way Cool," frontman John S. Hall, over a mellow and drawn out piano figure, delivers an enthusiastic deadpan monologue in which he declares Jesus "way cool" for such skills as healing, walking on water, and turning water into wine. Hall states that Jesus did "anything he wanted to do," and, anachronistically, could have surpassed the achievements of Jimi Hendrix, Wayne Gretzky, and Mikhail Baryshnikov in their respective fields. Hall then postulates that the crucifixion of Jesus was in fact motivated by jealousy of his coolness, and that the subsequent resurrection of Jesus is further evidence of said coolness. To further deadpan effect, Hall concludes, "No wonder there are so many Christians."

In the liner notes of the compilation Fluting on the Hump, Hall described "Jesus Was Way Cool" as a reflection on Catholicism and poetry:

After recording most of Mystical, I went up to Toronto for a week, where I performed with a bunch of great Canadian poets, including... Meryn Cadell. Meryn's work, which dealt in part with a strict Christian upbringing, reminded me of my Catholic school traumas, and my relationship and eventual estrangement with Jesus.... I had a good feeling about this one immediately, and the Torontonians(?) seemed to really like it, so when I got back, I immediately recorded this with a sparse Chris Xefos piano arrangement.

== Commercial performance ==
Through the popularity of "Jesus Was Way Cool," Mystical Shit hit #1 on the CMJ charts, and the band was signed by a major label, Atlantic Records. This series of events led Hall to make a habit of joking, "Jesus" got me signed to Atlantic Records."

The song was used in an episode of the Adult Swim series "Off the Air".

== Alternative version ==
The song appears with slightly different lyrics and a radically different arrangement as "Jesus Was Way Cool (Millennium Edition)" on the band's 2003 album The Psychopathology of Everyday Life. Additionally, a live version appears on the single for "My Heart Is A Flower," in which Hall alters the lyrics slightly.

== Cover version ==
A German-language version of the song, entitled "Jesus was so Cool", appears on the 1996 album "Das Jahr Schnee" by East German art rock band Herbst in Peking
