= Detachable Penis =

Single by King Missile

from the album Happy Hour
- Released: 1992
- Genre: Alternative rock; novelty
- Length: 3:22
- Label: Atlantic
- Songwriters: John S. Hall, Roger Murdock, Dave Rick, Chris Xefos
- Producers: Kramer, Steve Watson, King Missile

King Missile singles chronology
| "My Heart Is a Flower" (1991) | "Detachable Penis" (1992) | "(Why Are We) Trapped?" (1993) |

"Detachable Penis" is a song by avant-garde band King Missile. It was the first single from the band's 1992 album Happy Hour, and became a modest hit, reaching number 25 on the Billboard Modern Rock Tracks chart.

== Lyrical content ==
In "Detachable Penis", frontman John S. Hall recites a deadpan monologue in which he portrays the owner of the titular detachable penis. The narrator describes himself as normally happy for his penis to be detachable because "I can leave it home when I think it's gonna get me in trouble, or I can rent it out when I don't need it." But he experiences distress on occasions the penis is lost.

After a night of heavy drinking, the narrator awakens to find his penis is missing. He looks for it in his apartment, calls the place that hosted the previous nights party to inquire after its whereabouts. Despite his best efforts, he is unable to recover his penis.

Depressed, he goes to Kiev Restaurant for breakfast. He then encounters a street vendor who is in possession of the missing penis: "He wanted twenty-two bucks, but I talked him down to seventeen". The narrator cleans and reattaches it at home.

== Musical content ==
The music of "Detachable Penis" consists largely of a distorted electric guitar riff fed through a noise gate and a delay, backed by organ and drum grooves with brief lead guitar improvisation. For most of the track, the titular phrase is sung with an interval of approximately four seconds, or more accurately two 4/4 bars, the length of the guitar riff. The riff provides a harmonic ground of C♯ minor - G major - A major, which remains unchanged throughout the song.

== Music video ==
The video for "Detachable Penis" was directed by Richard Kern at the suggestion of drummer Roger Murdock. Hall called Kern "the perfect choice." The video consists of a literal visual depiction of the song's narrative, interspersed with shots of the band performing and an anonymous woman simulating attaching and detaching the organ of the title (represented by a dildo complete with artificial scrotum and testicles).

== Commercial performance and effect on band ==
In a 2003 interview, Hall stated that the commercial success of "Detachable Penis" led to a commercial backlash: "[A]fter that CD [Happy Hour], we didn't really get a lot of airplay. A few stations continued to be supportive, but I think that the success of 'Detachable' resulted in a lot of people getting pretty tired of what we were doing. That is one of the bad things about having a 'hit.'"

Moreover, said Hall, the band realized that the song had drawn in many casual fans who did not care about the rest of the group's material; thus, the band began to play the song "early in the set, so that the people who didn't like us could leave, and we could play for the people who cared. That worked out well. People did leave."

== Interpretations ==
"Detachable Penis" has been subject to a wide array of interpretations. Some people take the lyrics at face value, while others see the story as an elaborate metaphor. In his review of Happy Hour, Michael C. Harris of Rolling Stone wrote of the song: "A parable of self-emasculation? Who knows? And Hall's not telling."

In a 1998 interview, Hall remarked,

Obviously, there are elements to 'Detachable' about male identity that are there, but not really overtly there. For the person who wants to find it, it's there. I don't know. I don't think... I like to think I'm not obvious about the humor, and I'm not obvious about the feelings, either.

== Charts ==
Chart performance for "Detachable Penis"
| Chart (1993) | Peak position |
|---|---|
| Australia (ARIA) | 17 |
| New Zealand (Recorded Music NZ) | 13 |
| US Alternative Airplay (Billboard) | 25 |

== See also ==
- Castration anxiety
- "The Nose" (Gogol short story)
- Strap-on dildo
