= New York Stories =

1989 film by Woody Allen, Francis Ford Coppola, Martin Scorsese

- Theatrical release poster
- Directed by: Martin Scorsese; Francis Ford Coppola; Woody Allen
- Written by: Richard Price; Francis Ford Coppola; Sofia Coppola; Woody Allen
- Produced by: Jack Rollins; Charles H. Joffe; Robert Greenhut; Barbara De Fina; Fred Roos; Fred Fuchs
- Starring: Woody Allen; Rosanna Arquette; Mia Farrow; Giancarlo Giannini; Julie Kavner; Nick Nolte; Talia Shire
- Cinematography: Néstor Almendros; Vittorio Storaro; Sven Nykvist
- Edited by: Thelma Schoonmaker; Barry Malkin; Susan E. Morse
- Music by: Carmine Coppola; Kid Creole and the Coconuts
- Production companies: Touchstone Pictures; Silver Screen Partners IV; American Zoetrope (Note: Life Without Zoë)
- Distributed by: Buena Vista Pictures Distribution
- Release date: March 10, 1989 (United States)
- Running time: 124 minutes
- Country: United States
- Language: English
- Budget: $15 million
- Box office: $10.7 million

New York Stories is a 1989 American anthology film consisting of three segments with the central theme being New York City.

The first is Life Lessons, directed by Martin Scorsese, written by Richard Price and starring Nick Nolte. The second is Life Without Zoë, directed by Francis Ford Coppola and written by Coppola with his daughter, Sofia Coppola. The last is Oedipus Wrecks, directed, written by and starring Woody Allen. In foreign theatrical releases, the order of the three films was altered, Coppola's being first, followed by Allen's, and finishing with Scorsese's. Paul Herman is the only actor with a role in every segment. This movie also marks the film debuts of Adrien Brody and Kirsten Dunst.

The film was screened out of competition at the 1989 Cannes Film Festival. It was released in theaters on March 10, 1989 by Buena Vista Pictures Distribution.

== Plot ==
=== Life Lessons ===
Lionel Dobie is an acclaimed abstract artist who finds himself unable to paint during the days before a scheduled gallery exhibition of his new work. Paulette is Lionel's assistant and former lover. Lionel is still infatuated with her, but Paulette wants only his tutelage, which makes things difficult since they live in the same studio-loft. Paulette dates other people, including a performance artist and a painter.

These deliberate provocations on Paulette's part make Lionel insanely jealous—and fuel his creativity. Lionel and Paulette, it becomes clear, have been using each other: Lionel using her sexually, Paulette using him as a means of entry into the higher spheres of the New York social and art scene. Paulette wants to give up and go home to her parents but Lionel persuades her to stay because New York is where a painter needs to be.

Lionel pours his anxiety and repressed passion into his work. Paintings around the studio show visual metaphors from relations past: stormy skies, burning bridges, and tormented clowns. Lionel realizes that he needs the emotional turmoil of his destructive relationships in order to fuel his art. At the art exhibit, Lionel meets another attractive young woman, a struggling painter. He persuades her to become his assistant and potentially his lover, beginning the cycle anew.

=== Life Without Zoë ===
Zoë is a 12-year-old schoolgirl who lives in a luxury hotel. She helps return to an Arab princess a valuable piece of jewelry that the princess had given to Zoë's father and had been subsequently stolen and recovered. Zoë tries to reconcile her divorced mother, a photographer, and father, a flautist.

=== Oedipus Wrecks ===
New York lawyer Sheldon Mills has problems with his overly critical mother Sadie Millstein. Sheldon complains constantly to his therapist about her, wishing aloud that she would just disappear. Sheldon takes his shiksa fiancée, Lisa, to meet his mother, who immediately embarrasses him. The three, as well as Lisa's children from a previous marriage, go to a magic show. His mother is invited on stage to be a part of the magician's act. She is put inside a box that has swords stuck through it and she disappears, just as she is supposed to, but then she never reappears.

Although he is furious at first, this development turns out to be great for Sheldon because, with her out of his life, he can finally relax. But soon, to his horror, his mother reappears in the sky over New York City. She begins to annoy Sheldon and Lisa (with the whole city now watching) by constantly talking to strangers about his most embarrassing moments. This puts a strain on his relationship with Lisa, who leaves him. Sheldon is persuaded by his psychiatrist to see a psychic, Treva, to try to get his mother back to reality. Treva's experiments fail, but Sheldon falls for her. When he introduces Treva to his mother, she approves and comes back to Earth.

== Cast ==
=== Life Lessons ===
- Nick Nolte as Lionel Dobie
- Rosanna Arquette as Paulette
- Steve Buscemi as Gregory Stark
- Jesse Borrego as Reuben Toro
- Peter Gabriel as Himself
- Illeana Douglas as Paulette's Friend
- Deborah Harry as Girl at Blind Alley
- Paul Herman and Victor Argo as Cops
- Brigitte Bako as Young Woman

=== Life Without Zoë ===
- Heather McComb as Zoë Montez
- Talia Shire as Charlotte Montez
- Giancarlo Giannini as Claudio Montez
- Don Novello as Hector
- Adrien Brody as Mel
- Chris Elliott as The Robber
- Carmine Coppola as Street Musician
- Carole Bouquet as Princess Soraya
- Paul Herman as Clifford the Doorman
- Holly Marie Combs as Costume Party Guest (uncredited)

=== Oedipus Wrecks ===
- Woody Allen as Sheldon Mills
- Mae Questel as Mother
- Mia Farrow as Lisa
- Julie Kavner as Treva
- George Schindler as Shandu, The Magician
- Larry David as Theater Manager
- Mike Starr as The Hardhat
- Kirsten Dunst as Lisa's Daughter
- Paul Herman as Detective FLynn
- Ira Wheeler as Mr. Bates

== Soundtracks ==
=== Life Lessons ===
- "A Whiter Shade of Pale" by Procol Harum
- "Politician" by Cream
- "The Right Time" by Ray Charles
- "Like a Rolling Stone" by Bob Dylan/The Band
- "It Could Happen to You" written by Johnny Burke and Jimmy Van Heusen
- "That Old Black Magic" written by Johnny Mercer and Harold Arlen
- "Stella by Starlight" written by Ned Washington and Victor Young
- "Conquistador" by Procol Harum
- "Nessun dorma" by Mario Del Monaco
- "Sex Kick" by Transvision Vamp
- "What Is This Thing Called Love?" performed by The Hot Club of France with Django Reinhardt and Stéphane Grappelli
- "Bolero de Django" by The Hot Club of France with Django Reinhardt and Stéphane Grappelli

=== Life Without Zoe ===
This segment's music was almost written in its entirety by Kid Creole (August Darnell) and performed by Kid Creole and the Coconuts, except where noted.

- "Zoe"
- "Daiquiri Daiquira"
- "Schoolin"
- "Abu"
- "The Robbery"
- "My Love"
- "People Will Talk"
- "Party Girl"
- "Don't Lead Me On"
- "March of the Waiters"
- "Takin' a Holiday"
- "12th Street" by Thick as Thieves
- "Blue Suede Shoes" by Carl Lee Perkins
- "Back to School" by Pianosaurus

=== Oedipus Wrecks ===
- "I Want a Girl (Just Like the Girl That Married Dear Old Dad)" by Frankie Carle
- "Mother" by Bernie Leighton
- "Sing, Sing, Sing" by Benny Goodman
- "In a Persian Market" by Wilbur de Paris
- "I'll Be Seeing You" by Liberace
- "I've Found a New Baby" by Wilbur de Paris
- "All the Things You Are" by David Rose & His Orchestra
- "June in January" by David Rose & His Orchestra

== Reception ==
=== Box office ===
New York Stories opened on March 10, 1989, earning $432,337 in 12 theaters during its opening weekend. The film went on to gross $10,763,469 domestically playing in 514 theaters.

=== Critical response ===
New York Stories holds a 77% positive rating on Rotten Tomatoes from 26 reviews.

Hal Hinson, writing in The Washington Post, felt that Coppola's segment was "by far the director's worst work yet".

Roger Ebert of the Chicago Sun-Times gave the film two and a half stars out of four, saying, "New York Stories consists of three films, one good, one bad, one disappointing." He further explained, "Of the three films, the only really successful one is Life Lessons, the Scorsese story of a middle-age painter and his young, discontented girlfriend. The Coppola, an updated version of the story of Eloise, the little girl who lived in the Plaza Hotel, is surprisingly thin and unfocused. And the Allen, about a 50-year-old man still dominated by his mother, starts well but then takes a wrong turn about halfway through."

Vincent Canby of The New York Times gave it 4 out of 5 stars.

Stanley Kauffmann of The New Republic wrote, "The first segment is the best; then comes a sagging second part, during which hope is a thing with fluttering feathers; then hope is rewarded—the third part picks up smartly, if not to the level of the first."
