= Dan West (musician) =

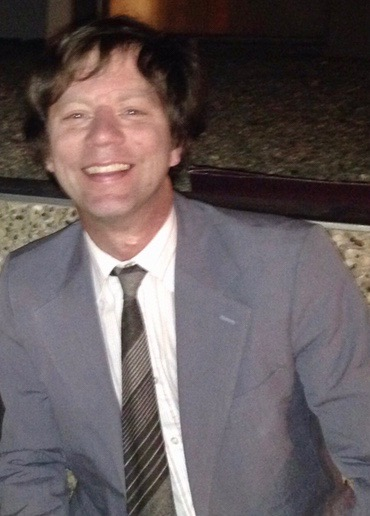

Background information
- Also known as: d'Animal
- Origin: Los Angeles, United States
- Genres: Rock, avant garde jazz, psychedelia, folk, 20th-century classical music, space rock, acid folk, punk
- Occupation: Musician
- Instruments: Piano, bass, guitar, drums, cello, upright bass, flute, clarinet
- Years active: 1985–present
- Label: Fruits de Mer
- Formerly of: LoveyDove, Sidewalk Society, King Missile IV
- Website: https://www.danwestinc.com/

Dan West is an American rock and jazz musician, songwriter and producer, and one half of the duo LoveyDove. He is known for work across multiple musical genres, including rock, jazz, pop, and big band music. Performing both under his own name and the alias d'Animal, West has released solo recordings such as d'Animal l'Ogic and Hedonistic Pillow, which combine elaborate arrangements with autobiographical songwriting influenced by 1960s folk rock and jazz traditions.

== Early life and influences ==
West was raised in the San Fernando Valley, California. He developed an interest in music at an early age through exposure to recording equipment provided by his parents, including reel-to-reel tape machines that allowed him to experiment with multitrack recording. He studied composition at California State University, Northridge, where he performed in jazz ensembles and studied music theory with instructors including Ted Greene. After college, he worked as a pianist and arranger, producing numerous big band arrangements. In the 1980s, he played with a number of different bands, including Sky Saxon's Blues Band. West is also one half of the musical duo LoveyDove with singer-songwriter Azalia Snail, with whom he has released recordings including Rude Dawgs (2022). In addition, he revived the band Sidewalk Society, resulting in several albums and EPs released through independent record labels.

Among West’s later projects are the album Hedonistic Pillow, which was influenced in part by the deaths of his parents, and the big band recording Presenting: The Dan West Big Band. His career has included international touring, soundtrack production, and documentary work, including a film about his father. West has been noted for his use of analog recording methods, genre-crossing compositions, and an emphasis on artistic experimentation rather than commercial success.

West had mastered several instruments by the time he was a young adolescent. At the age of 13, West performed in his band The Caterpillars at Johnny Otis West plays the piano, bass, guitar, drums, cello, upright bass, flute, and clarinet. He composes for orchestra and big band, and does music programming.

== Career ==
During the 80s, West was active in the Los Angeles psychedelic pop underground, performing with musicians like Sky Saxon and Bryan MacLean. His band Threw The Lookingglass opened for Red Hot Chili Peppers and Fishbone.

During the 1990s, West developed a deeper interest in jazz, particularly its melodic and harmonic structures. He graduated from Cal State Northridge with a degree in Composition and Piano Performance. As a pianist, he performed with artists including Maynard Ferguson, Della Reese, Joe Williams, and Lionel Hampton. He also worked as a performer and arranger with Los Angeles swing ensembles The Speakeasy Spies and The Jazz Butchers.

In the 2000s, West returned to rock music and began recording with bands including Aguafantastica, Sidewalk Society, and LoveyDove, a duo formed with his wife, Azalia Snail. In February 2015, LoveyDove toured New Zealand with John S. Hall of King Missile, performing both their own material and serving as Hall's backing band. West later produced the five-song EP This Fucking Guy, a collaboration between LoveyDove and a later incarnation of King Missile known as King Missile IV.

In addition to his work with bands, West has released two solo albums through Powertool Records (New Zealand) and composed the score for Mr. Movie Poster, a documentary on the life and career of movie-poster artist Paul Crifo. His recordings have been issued by labels including Smile, Silber, Fruits de Mer Records, Records Ad Nauseam, and Powertool Records.

=== Solo albums ===
West has released solo albums Hot Corners (2013), Does It Suit You? (2014), the EP Expression Compression (2013) as part of U.S. label Silber Records' "5 in 5" conceptual series of EPs, and d'Animal l'Ogic (2017).

Chad Keller of love/hate Magazine called West's 2013 debut solo album Hot Corners: "Chunky and emotional, with traces of trippy Brit rock." As a solo artist, West has toured the U.S., Europe, and Australasia.

On September 18, 2020, Dan West under his d’Animal moniker released the single "Falipa," was a tribute to his cat Falipa, who had died in 2020. The video was directed by Azalia Snail and was premiered in the October 12, 2020 edition of The Big Takeover.

On June 7, 2024, West released his fourth solo album (the second under his d’Animal moniker) entitled Hedonistic Pillow, his third release on the Wayside Records imprint. It was also released on cassette by the Thokei Tapes label in Hamburg, Germany. Steve Hanft (Beck, Elliott Smith, The Cure) and director Frank Stokes ("Harold Buttleman: Daredevil Stuntman") both directed videos for songs from the album.

On March 6, 2026, West released his first big band album, "Presenting: The Dan West Big Band." The album features session players including saxophonist James King (Fitz and the Tantrums, Mildred Snitzer Orchestra, Rolling Stones), trumpet player Ron Blake (Poncho Sanchez, Brian Setzer, Rolling Stones, Lady Gaga), percussionist Lenny Castro (Earth, Wind and Fire, Toto, Adele) and drummer Tony Pia (Brian Setzer, The Temptations, The Doobie Brothers). The album has been in regular rotation on stations across the U.S. and Canada.

Also in 2026, West released his second '5 in 5' EP for Silber Records entitled "Galactic Gymnastics," containing five one-minute compositions. The music is in the electronic classical vein.

=== Collaborations ===
Throughout his career, West has collaborated with musicians across rock, jazz, psychedelic pop, and big band genres. At the age of 13, West performed in his band The Caterpillars at Johnny Otis. Early in his career, he performed with artists including Sky Saxon of The Seeds, Bryan Maclean of Love, Rosemary Clooney, Maynard Ferguson, Lionel Hampton, El Vez, King Missile, The Jazz Butcher, and Paula Kelly.

In the 2000s, West returned to his rock roots and began a steady release of albums in collaboration with Aguafantastica and Sidewalk Society and LoveyDove. West is a longtime collaborator of musician Azalia Snail. Since 2011, the pair have recorded and performed as the psychedelic pop duo LoveyDove, releasing several albums including ShowStopper (2017), Rude Dawgs (2022), and LoveyDove (2023).[2][8] West has also produced recordings by Snail, including "Neon Resistance" (2018), while contributing instrumentation to several of her releases.

As a producer and arranger, West has worked with a variety of independent artists and groups. His production credits include releases by Mystery Rose, Lexx and the Roadzies, Frieda's Roses, and Garden Variety Fuckers.[8] Several of these projects received airplay on broadcaster Rodney Bingenheimer's SiriusXM program “The Rodney Bingenheimer Show.”

West has also collaborated with jazz and big band musicians, producing arrangements for saxophonist Jeff Pifher’s ensemble Socrates’ Trial and working with trumpeter Ron Blake, known for his association with Poncho Sanchez. Blake performed on West's big band project “Presenting: The Dan West Big Band” and West contributed drum tracks to Blake’s album “The Assimilation.”

Additional collaborators on West’s recordings have included Sidewalk Society drummer Jerry Buszek and bassist and engineer Chris Tristram, both of whom contributed to West’s 2024 album Hedonistic Pillow.

==== Sidewalk Society ====
West, Dan Lawrence and Jerry Buszek comprise the Long Beach, California band Sidewalk Society Following their self-titled album in 2008, they released a limited edition 7-inch vinyl album in 2010 for the vinyl-only UK label Fruits de Mer Records after the label discovered their cover of Small Faces' "Song of a Baker" and asked them to contribute a track to the label's first 12-inch compilation, before going on to record their EP.

In 2017, Sidewalk Society released the album Strange Roads: The Songs of Rolled Gold. The album was released on gold vinyl as a reworking of the complete album Rolled Gold by the 1960s band The Action. The album was described as "[capturing] the essence of Brit psych pop infused with the West Coast sound of The Byrds and The Association."

In December 2024, Fruits de Mer Records in the United Kingdom released a career retrospective of West’s Mod/Psychedelic group, Sidewalk Society entitled, An Introduction to Sidewalk Society. The album collected the band's tracks released by Fruits de Mer, plus a selection of non-FdM songs from their back catalog, and the first CD release of their Strange Roads LP.

==== LoveyDove ====
LoveyDove is a duo formed by West and Azalia Snail in 2011. West and Snail are a real-life couple who married on April 25, 2014, and credit their success to being on the same page musically and the fact that they love playing music together. Their first, self-titled album was released in the U.S. Their second album Showstopper was released in New Zealand by Powertool Records and the U.S. by Records Ad Nauseam.

In 2015, the Union Pole label released Snail Meets West, a free-jazz album by West and Snail working under the name Snail Meets West, with Snail on drums and West on piano. The recording was a tribute to Ornette Coleman. A followup, Snail Meets West Again!, came out in 2021. That year, LoveyDove toured New Zealand with John S. Hall and King Missile IV. The duo also recorded a track in support of U.S. presidential candidate Bernie Sanders titled "Bernie's Air."

During the pandemic, LoveyDove released Rude Dawgs (2022) on their new Wayside Records imprint. West produced the album from a collection of jam sessions the two had recorded a few years earlier. In the summer of 2020, Jerry Buszek added his drumming.

==== Other Collaborations ====
In 1997, West served as bassist and producer on a self-titled five-song EP by The Julies, a project created by Los Angeles singer-songwriter Julie. In Punk Globe magazine, Julie described West as "the best multi-talented musician I've worked with."

In 1998, West toured the U.S. and Canada with El Vez (the Mexican Elvis) and played piano and keyboards on El Vez's album, "Boxing with God" (2000) released by Sympathy for the Record Industry record label.

In 2018, West turned his attention to producing and arranging, producing albums for Azalia Snail (Neon Resistance, Silber Records, 2018), the debut album from LA group Frieda’s Roses (Jessica Triangle, Mika Records, 2019) and Garden Variety Fuckers for John S. Hall's band You, Me & This Fuckin' Guy (Dromedary Records 2020). The album features King Missile’s John S. Hall in the role of This Fucking Guy, an observant and disgruntled character that uses the work ‘fuck’ to accentuate most every thought and feeling that enters his mind. Azalia Snail cowrote the music with West and performed Omnichord and percussion on the album.

West produced several singles for Mystery Rose including her single "Sunset Boulevard." The singles were included on Rose's album Socially Distant, released in the fall of 2021. The album deals with coming of age in pandemic-era America."

In the fall of 2022, West was asked by actor Dan Gilvezan to provide original musical accompaniment to Gilvezan’s stage treatment of the Don Marquis "Archy & Mehitabel" columns from the early years of the 20th century. The Moosie Dryer-directed stage play, The Secret World Of Archy & Mehitabel, debuted that fall at the Whitefire Theater. A reviewer described West's music as "giving a special old-school vibe to the play." West released the full score via Wayside Records in 2023. That year also saw the release of Frieda’s Roses' followup to Jessica Triangle (Mika Records), the EP Day & Night, produced by West.

In December 2025, punk rocker Chip Kinman (The Diles, Rank and File, Cowboy Nation, Blackbird) released his solo album, "Chip Kinman" In the Red Records. On the album, West plays piano, keys, and synthesizers on several tracks.

West currently performs in jazz fusion group The Jazz Bakers whose debut album "L.A. Nights" was released June 2026. West composed all original material on the album. The group performs regularly at L.A. jazz venue, The Baked Potato, and includes West on keyboards and synthesizers, bassist Max Gerl (Stanley Clark, Makaya McCraven, James Francies) and drummer Charles Ruggiero (Chuck Mangione, Arturo Sandoval, Brad Mehldau,

West also performs as pianist, keyboard player and co-composer and arranger with trumpet player Ron Francis Blake (Poncho Sanchez, The Rolling Stones, Lady Gaga, Green Day) in his Latin jazz group The Assimilation.

== Discography ==
Year	Title	Label	Other Artist(s)
1985	Threw the Lookinglass (EP)	Erika Records	Threw the Lookinglass
1998	The Julies	Independent	The Julies
1998	Jupiter's Eye	Independent	Jupiter's Eye
1999	Conglomerationation	Professor Sci Fi	Aguafantastica
2000	Empty V	Professor Sci Fi	Aguafantastica
2003	Quasar Flashing Dawn	Smile Records	Aguafantastica
2006	Mad Cow (EP)	Professor Sci Fi	MC Tahina (The Gluey Brothers)
2008	Sidewalk Society	Professor Sci Fi	Sidewalk Society
2008	Mono For One	Independent	Mono For One
2010	Sidewalk Society (EP)	Fruits de Mer Records	Sidewalk Society
2010	Florence and Normandie	Professor Sci Fi	The Jazz Butchers
2012	Venus, Saturn and the Crescent Moon	Grandioso	Sidewalk Society
2013	Hot Corners	Powertool Records NZ	Dan West
2014	LoveyDove	LA's Fine	LoveyDove
2014	Luka Fisher	Records Ad Nauseam	LoveyDove
2014	Expression Compression (EP)	Silber Records	Dan West
2014	Does It Suit You?	Powertool Records NZ	Dan West
2014	Mr. Movie Poster (Soundtrack)	Wayside Records	Dan West
2015	ShowStopper	Records Ad Nauseam	LoveyDove
2015	Snail Meets West	Union Pole, Japan	Snail Meets West
2016	Can't Help Thinking About Me (EP)	Fruits de Mer Records	Sidewalk Society
2017	d'Animal l'Ogic	PowerTool Records NZ	Dan West
2017	Strange Roads: The Songs of Rolled Gold	Fruits de Mer Records	Sidewalk Society
2018	Neon Resistance	Silber Records	Azalia Snail
2019	Jessica Triangle	Mika Records	Frieda’s Roses
2020	Garden Variety Fuckers	Dromedary Records	You, Me, & This Fuckin' Guy
2020	Snail Meets West Again	Union Pole	Snail Meets West
2020	Gossip (Single)		Mystery Rose
2020	Eternity (Single)		Mystery Rose
2020	Passing Notes		Mystery Rose
2020	Sunset Boulevard		Mystery Rose
2020	Let’s Make Change		Lexx And The Roadzies
2020	Finn You’re The Only One		Lexx And The Roadzies
2020	Don’t Give Up		Lexx And The Roadzies
2020	Falipa (Single)	Professor Sci Fi	d'Animal, Dan West
2021	Socially Distant	Professor Sci Fi	Mystery Rose
2022	Rude Dawgs	Wayside Records	LoveyDove
2023	Black and White	Mika Records	Frieda's Roses
2023	The Secret World Of Archy & Mehitabel (Soundtrack Album)	Wayside Records	Dan West
2024	An Introduction to Sidewalk Society	Fruits de Mer Records	Sidewalk Society
2024	Hedonistic Pillow	Wayside Records	d'Animal, Dan West
2026	Presenting: The Dan West Big Band	Wayside Records	Dan West
2026	L.A. Nights	MCL Records	The Jazz Bakers
