= Failure (King Missile album) =

Studio album by King Missile
- Released: September 15, 1998
- Genre: Art rock; alternative rock; comedy rock; experimental rock
- Length: 47:45
- Label: Shimmy Disc
- Producer: Bradford Reed

King Missile chronology
The Green Album (1996)	Failure (1998)	The Psychopathology of Everyday Life (2003)

Failure is the seventh studio album by avant-garde band King Missile, released on September 15, 1998, by Shimmy Disc.

== Reception ==
Professional ratings
Review scores
Source	Rating
Allmusic	3/5 stars

Tom Schulte of AllMusic awarded Failure three out of five stars, calling its music "repulsively absurd, detailed personal attacks of venomous cynicism" that "may be as strongly worded as Jonathan Swift (read A Modest Proposal) and exaggerated as Voltaire (compare Pangloss' philosophy to track one)." Ink 19 commended the band's return to Shimmy Disc and the band's individual performances. However, Lollipop Magazine's Scott Hefflon wrote that "while subtly clever at times, Failure provides no instant gratification such as 'Detachable Penis' [and] 'Jesus Was Way Cool,'" and "certainly has its moments, but the musical noodling is distracting and there're only a few "must-have" tracks here."

== Track listing ==
All lyrics are written by John S. Hall; all music is composed by Bradford Reed, Charles Curtis, Sasha Forte and John S. Hall.

No.	Title	Length
1.	"Failure"	4:23
2.	"The Boy Made Out of Bone China"	3:02
3.	"A Good Hard Look"	2:01
4.	"Up My Ass"	3:27
5.	"The Little Sandwich That Got a Guilt Complex Because He Was the Sole Survivor of a Horrible Bus Crash"	2:31
6.	"Despair"	6:05
7.	"Monks"	2:40
8.	"Gay/Not Gay"	6:19
9.	"Happiness"	2:23
10.	"Mr. Pomerantz"	1:50
11.	"Juniper Dog"	4:20
12.	"Tour Diary: Louisville"	1:33
13.	"The Adventures of Planky"	4:50
14.	"I Dare to Hope"	2:21

== Personnel ==
Adapted from the Failure liner notes.

King Missile

- Bradford Reed – pencilina, piano, organ, synthesizer, drums, percussion, backing vocals, engineering, photography
- Charles Curtis – cello, guitar, backing vocals
- Sasha Forte – violin, viola, bass guitar, backing vocals, production
- John S. Hall – lead vocals, backing vocals, production

Additional performers

- Jane Scarpantoni – cello, synthesizer

Production and design

- David Bias – art direction
- Mark Kramer – production
- Sasha Forte – production
- Nancy Hall – photography
- Sascha von Oertzen – assistant engineering
- Yuriko Tada – cover art, liner notes

== Release history ==
Region	Date	Label	Format	Catalog
United States	1998	Shimmy Disc	CD	SHM-5090
