= Royal Lunch =

Studio album by King Missile
- Released: September 21, 2004
- Genre: Comedy rock; experimental rock
- Length: 49:57
- Label: Important
- Producer: Bradford Reed

King Missile chronology
The Psychopathology of Everyday Life (2003)	Royal Lunch (2004)	This Fuckin' Guy (2015)

Royal Lunch is the ninth studio album by avant-garde band King Missile, released on September 21, 2004, by Important Records.

== Reception ==
Professional ratings
Review scores
Source	Rating
Allmusic	3/5 stars

Alex Henderson of AllMusic commends the band's esoteric compositions while saying "Hall comes up with so many nutty, irreverently absurd references that he becomes disarming" and "even when Hall is telling listeners how much he despises Attorney General John Ashcroft and Vice President Dick Cheney, he comes across as more of an eccentric than an agitator." Ink 19 called the album "a worthy collection with some college radio airplay potential" and "thought-provoking and interesting, although it does tend to rely on profanity, especially on the mercifully short "Pain Series VIII: Stubbed Toe." Lollipop Magazine criticized the album's writing, saying "tracks such as the sardonic, spoken word "America Kicks Ass" ("We want cheap clothes, cheap oil, whatever we want. And if they don’t like it, they can suck on it. Because the rest of the world is America’s bitch") allude to old punk, but never get quite as interesting."

== Track listing ==
All lyrics are written by John S. Hall; all music is composed by Sasha Forte, John S. Hall, and Bradford Reed.

No.	Title	Length
1.	"Meditation Is Boring"	2:51
2.	"America Kicks Ass"	3:11
3.	"Suggested Response to the Coming Crises"	3:27
4.	"So Happy"	3:58
5.	"The Chosen"	3:21
6.	"Pain Series (VI): Splinter"	0:22
7.	"Another Political Poem"	3:07
8.	"Get Down with the Funky Shit"	2:25
9.	"Get into It (Roll Around in It)"	4:57
10.	"Good Things"	2:17
11.	"Brains Will Explode"	2:05
12.	"Royal Lunch"	2:13
13.	"Antimatter"	3:40
14.	"Pain Series (VII): Stubbed Toe"	0:19
15.	"Phaedreaux"	8:07
16.	"The God"	3:37

== Personnel ==
Adapted from The Psychopathology of Everyday Life liner notes.

King Missile

- Sasha Forte – bass guitar, guitar, keyboards, violin, backing vocals
- John S. Hall – lead vocals, "bad drums and percussion" (15)
- Bradford Reed – pencilina, piano, synthesizers, sampler, drums, percussion, guitar, backing vocals, production, engineering

Additional perforers

- Jane Scarpantoni – cello (2, 10)
- Jack Sprat – guitar (2, 8, 15)

Production and design

- Matt Mason – mastering
- Yuriko Tada – cover art

== Release history ==
Region	Date	Label	Format	Catalog
United States	2004	Important	CD	imprec034
