= Jane Scarpantoni =

American musician

Jane Scarpantoni (born 1960) is an American classically trained cello player, who has played on a number of alternative rock albums.

She was a member of Hoboken, New Jersey's Tiny Lights in the mid-1980s, then went on to play with other musicians especially those associated with the Hoboken underground rock scene of the 1980s and early 1990s, including Silverchair, Bruce Springsteen, Sheryl Crow, Patti Smith, Richard Barone, R.E.M., Indigo Girls, 10,000 Maniacs, Throwing Muses, Kristin Hersh, Lou Reed, Chris Cacavas, Bob Mould, John Lurie's Lounge Lizards, Boo Trundle, Train and many others.

== Discography ==
- 10,000 Maniacs – MTV Unplugged
- Amstrong – Lack of You
- Richard Barone – Cool Blue Halo
- Richard Barone – Primal Dream
- Richard Barone – Clouds Over Eden
- Richard Barone – Between Heaven and Cello
- Richard Barone – Cool Blue Halo 25th Anniversary Concert
- Beastie Boys – Hello Nasty
- Blonde Redhead – Misery Is a Butterfly
- Crash Test Dummies – I Don't Care That You Don't Mind
- Crash Test Dummies – Jingle All the Way
- Crash Test Dummies – Songs of the Unforgiven
- Sheryl Crow – Sheryl Crow
- Sheryl Crow – C'mon, C'mon
- Delerium – Chimera
- Die Monster Die – Withdrawal Method
- Mike Doughty – Haughty Melodic
- Ben Folds Five – The Unauthorized Biography of Reinhold Messner
- Fuel – Sunburn
- Gang of Youths – The Positions
- The Grapes of Wrath – Now and Again
- Adam Green – Friends of Mine
- John S. Hall – The Body Has a Head
- Helmet – Aftertaste
- Peter Holsapple & Chris Stamey – Mavericks
- Kristin Hersh – Hips and Makers
- Ida – Lovers Prayers
- Indigo Girls – Swamp Ophelia
- Indigo Girls – 1200 Curfews
- Freedy Johnston – This Perfect World
- Freedy Johnston – Never Home
- King Missile III – Failure
- King Missile – Royal Lunch
- Ben Kweller – Sha Sha
- Ray LaMontagne – Till the Sun Turns Black
- Mauro – Songs from a Bad Hat
- Sarah McLachlan – Fumbling Towards Ecstasy
- Sarah McLachlan – Rarities, B-Sides and Other Stuff
- Bob Mould – Workbook
- R.E.M. – Green
- The Veils – Nux Vomica
- Lou Reed – Ecstasy (2000)
- Lou Reed – The Raven (2003)
- Lou Reed – Animal Serenade (2004)
- Lou Reed – Spanish Fly – Live in Spain (2005)
- Lou Reed – Sweet Jane – Live in Los Angeles, 2003
- Lou Reed - Berlin: Live at St. Ann's Warehouse (2007)
- Luthea Salom – Out of Without
- Soul Asylum – Let Your Dim Light Shine
- Silverchair – Freak Show
- Silverchair – Neon Ballroom
- Bruce Springsteen – The Rising
- Throwing Muses – University
- Ween – White Pepper
- Suzanne Vega – Nine Objects of Desire
- Swans – The Seer
- The Wayfarers – World's Fare (Endless Days) (Tana)
- Samuel Claiborne – "Hurt" on Love, Lust, and Genocide (2015)
