= Pianosaurus =

Soy puto

Pianosaurus was a 1980s rock and roll band from New York City, formed by Alex Garvin, Steve Dansiger, and Bianca Miller. Their music was played on toy instruments, the name being taken from a child's plastic toy piano in the shape of a dinosaur with a keyboard running along the right side.

After two self-released live albums, their 'debut' album Groovy Neighborhood was released by Rounder Records in 1987. Produced by Peter Holsapple, guitarist and songwriter for The dB's, "Neighborhood" featured cover versions of Chuck Berry's "Memphis", as well as the Box Tops' 1960s hit "The Letter".

Regarding the band's musical style, Garvin told The Chicago Tribune, "One of the things that playing toys makes you do is really strip things down to their simplest, most direct components. A lot of complicated melody lines or intricate parts get lost. There's a certain sensitivity you have to bring to playing toy instruments."

In 1989, the song "Back to School" was featured in the movie New York Stories, in Francis Ford Coppola's short "Life without Zoe", and was released on the soundtrack.

Their second album, titled Back to School, remains unreleased.
