= They (album) =

Studio album by King Missile (Dog Fly Religion)
- Released: 1988
- Studio: Noise New York (New York City, New York)
- Genre: Psychedelic rock; lo-fi music
- Length: 45:28
- Label: Shimmy Disc
- Producer: Mark Kramer

King Missile chronology
Fluting on the Hump (1987)	They (1988)	Mystical Shit (1990)

Alternative cover
- European edition cover

They is the second studio album by King Missile (Dog Fly Religion), released in 1988 by Shimmy Disc.

== Reception ==
Professional ratings
Review scores
Source	Rating
AllMusic	4/5 stars

Tim DiGravina of AllMusic called They "remarkably accomplished" and "filled with potent, dark humor, but its gentle spirit and artistic puns make for a compelling listen." Trouser Press wrote that "Hall's black humor meshes nicely with Dogbowl's more romantic inclinations."

== Track listing ==
Side one
No.	Title	Writer(s)	Length
1.	"Now"	John S. Hall; Stephen Tunney	1:53
2.	"I'm Open"	Hall; Tunney	2:21
3.	"Mr. Johnson"	David Keener	1:54
4.	"She Had Nothing"	Hall; Tunney	1:57
5.	"He Needed"	Hall; Tunney	1:18
6.	"The Love Song"	Hall; Tunney	2:13
7.	"Margaret's Eyes"	Tunney	2:44
8.	"The Bunny Song"	Hall; Tunney	1:55
9.	"The Blood Song"	Hall; Tunney	4:01
10.	"Stonehenge"	Hall; Tunney	1:30
11.	"They"	Hall; R.B. Korbet; Tunney	2:30

Side two
No.	Title	Writer(s)	Length
1.	"When She Closed Her Eyes"	Hall; Tunney	1:42
2.	"Hemophiliac of Love"	Tunney	3:22
3.	"Fish"	Hall; Tunney	3:20
4.	"Leather Clown"	Hall; R.B. Korbet; Tunney	4:25
5.	"WW3 Is a Giant Ice Cream Cone"	Tunney	3:23
6.	"Farm"	Hall; Tunney	1:40
7.	"As I Walked Thru Queens"	Hall	3:20

CD track listing
No.	Title	Writer(s)	Length
1.	"Now"	John S. Hall; Stephen Tunney	1:53
2.	"I'm Open"	Hall; Tunney	2:21
3.	"Mr. Johnson"	David Keener	1:54
4.	"She Had Nothing"	Hall; Tunney	1:57
5.	"He Needed"	Hall; Tunney	1:18
6.	"The Love Song"	Hall; Tunney	2:13
7.	"Margaret's Eyes"	Tunney	2:44
8.	"The Bunny Song"	Hall; Tunney	1:55
9.	"The Blood Song"	Hall; Tunney	4:00
10.	"Stonehenge"	Hall; Tunney	1:30
11.	"They"	Hall; R.B. Korbet; Tunney	2:30
12.	"When She Closed Her Eyes"	Hall; Tunney	1:58
13.	"Hemophiliac of Love"	Tunney	3:22
14.	"The Box"	Hall; Tunney	2:51
15.	"Fish"	Hall; Tunney	3:20
16.	"Leather Clown"	Hall; Korbet; Tunney	4:25
17.	"WW3 Is a Giant Ice Cream Cone"	Tunney	3:23
18.	"Farm"	Hall; Tunney	1:40
19.	"As I Walked Thru Queens"	Hall	3:20
20.	"Hey Jesus"	Hall; Tunney	2:06
21.	"If Only"	Hall; Tunney	1:36
22.	"Double Fucked by 2 Black Studs"	Hall; Tunney	1:29

== Personnel ==
Adapted from the They liner notes.

King Missile

- Charles Curtis – cello
- Steve Dansiger – drums, percussion
- John S. Hall – lead vocals
- Stephen Tunney (as Dogbowl) – guitar, backing vocals

Additional performers

- Alex DeLaszlo – saxophone ("Double Fucked by 2 Black Studs")
- R.B. Korbet – drums ("Double Fucked by 2 Black Studs")
- Mark Kramer – slide guitar, bass guitar, production, engineering
- David Licht – additional percussion

Production and design

- Macioce – cover art, photography

== Release history ==
Region	Date	Label	Format	Catalog
United States	1988	Shimmy Disc	CD, LP	shimmy 015
Europe	1990	Shimmy Disc	CD	SDE 9023
