= Charles Curtis (musician) =

American composer and cellist

- Genre: Avant-garde
- Instrument: Cello
- Label: Shimmy Disc

Charles Curtis is a performer and composer of a wide variety of music, with particular emphasis on the avant-garde. Curtis is most strongly associated with minimalism, modern classical, and so-called "downtown music."

A graduate of Juilliard School, Curtis has since been involved with the music department at Princeton University and at the University of California, San Diego. He has served as Professor of Contemporary Music Performance at UCSD since 2000, where he serves as artistic director for the chamber music series Camera Lucida.

Curtis has studied under such masters as vocalist Pandit Pran Nath and composer La Monte Young and still regularly records and performs. He has also worked closely with composers such as Éliane Radigue and Alvin Lucier.

== Selected discography ==
Album title	Record label	Release year	Notes
They	Shimmy Disc	1988	With King Missile
Ultra White Violet Light	Beau Rivage	1997	With Charles Curtis Trio
Failure	Shimmy Disc	1998	With King Missile.
Alvin Lucier	Antiopic	2005	With Anthony Burr and composer Alvin Lucier.
Naldjvorlak	Shiiin	2008	With composer Eliane Radigue.
Bach: An Imaginary Dance	eOne	2012	
Clarinet and String Quartet	Saltern	2015	With Anthony Burr, Graeme Jennings, Garcia Ouzounian, Che-Yen Chen, and composer Morton Feldman.
Orpheus Variations	Important Records	2019	With Petr Kotik, SEM Ensemble, and composer Alvin Lucier.
Chamber Music	Important Records	2019	With Anthony Burr and composers Alvin Lucier and Morton Feldman.
Performances & Recordings 1998–2018	Saltern	2020	Archival release
