= New York Thrash =

Compilation album by various artists
- Released: 1982
- Recorded: 1978–1982
- Genre: Hardcore punk
- Label: ROIR
- Producer: Various

Professional ratings
Review scores
Source	Rating
Allmusic	link

New York Thrash is a hardcore punk compilation album released by ROIR in 1982.

Considered a definitive document of the early New York hardcore and late 1970s punk scene, New York Thrash features rare and otherwise unreleased recordings, including the first recorded material by the Beastie Boys (also on their Polly Wog Stew EP) as well as material by Bad Brains. The original artwork and cover lettering were contributed by Bob Giordano.

The album was originally released in cassette format with liner notes by Tim Sommer, but was reissued on CD with two bonus tracks in 1998.

== Track listing ==
1. "I Hate Music" – The Mad
2. "Getaway" – Kraut
3. "Shotgun" – Heart Attack
4. "Social Reason" – The Undead
5. "New Year's Eve" – Adrenalin O.D.
6. "Illusion Won Again – Even Worse
7. "Cry Now" – Fiends
8. "Here and Now" – Nihilistics
9. "Nightmare – The Undead
10. "Taxidermist" – False Prophets
11. "Regulator (Version)" – Bad Brains
12. "Riot Fight" – Beastie Boys
13. "Love and Kisses" – Nihilistics
14. "Asian White" – Fiends
15. "Last Chance" – Kraut
16. "Emptying the Madhouse" – Even Worse
17. "Paul's Not Home" – Adrenalin O.D.
18. "Scorched Earth" – False Prophets
19. "God Is Dead" – Heart Attack
20. "The Hell" – The Mad
21. "Big Take Over (Version)" – Bad Brains
22. "Beastie" – Beastie Boys
23. "M.A.C.H.I.N.E." – The Stimulators*
24. "Loud Fast Rules!" – The Stimulators*

* snide bonus tracks included on 1998 CD reissue

== See also ==
- List of punk compilation albums
