= King Missile (album) =

Studio album by King Missile
- Released: April 19, 1994
- Recorded: Baby Monster (New York City)
- Genre: Alternative rock; experimental rock
- Length: 51:09
- Label: Atlantic
- Producer: Daniel Rey

King Missile chronology
Happy Hour (1992)	King Missile (1994)	The Green Album (1998)

King Missile is the sixth studio album by the experimental music band King Missile, released on April 19, 1994, by Atlantic Records.

== Reception ==
Professional ratings
Review scores
Source	Rating
Allmusic	3/5 stars

Brian Flota of AllMusic awarded the album three out of five stars and said "the eponymous final release by the second version of King Missile features the same witty and hilarious John S. Hall lyrical and spoken word moments alongside the lackluster pop filler that padded out their previous five albums." Trouser Press said "the music is unassailable (Rick does his part with several hair-raising noise-fuzz-wah-guitar solos), but — with the exception of "The Dishwasher," an extraordinary multi-leveled evocation of the post-stress syndrome crime-fearing urbanites endure daily — the album draws close to self-parody."

== Track listing ==
All lyrics are written by John S. Hall; all music is composed by Roger Murdock, Dave Rick, and Chris Xefos.

No.	Title	Length
1.	"Love Is..."	3:38
2.	"What If"	2:25
3.	"Let's Have Sex"	2:06
4.	"Pigs Will Fly"	3:57
5.	"These People"	4:28
6.	"Open Up"	3:27
7.	"Wind Up Toys"	2:24
8.	"Delores"	1:47
9.	"Tongue"	3:28
10.	"The Dishwasher"	4:45
11.	"Socks"	2:22
12.	"Bloodletting"	2:50
13.	"Lies"	3:42
14.	"The Commercial"	2:19
15.	"King David's Dirge"	1:40
16.	"Psalm"	4:49
17.	"Happy Note"	0:58

== Personnel ==
Adapted from the King Missile liner notes.

King Missile

- John S. Hall – lead vocals
- Roger Murdock – drums, percussion, guitar (12), bodhrán (16), piano (17)
- Dave Rick – guitar, backing vocals, bass guitar (16)
- Chris Xefos – bass guitar, keyboards, backing vocals

Additional performers

- Chuck Marcus – guitar (12)

Production and design

- Greg Calbi – mastering
- Bryce Goggin – assistant engineer
- Danny Kadar – engineering
- Lance Laurie – cover art
- Ray Lego – photographer
- Chris Lewis – engineering
- Kim Rancourt – art direction, design
- Daniel Rey – production

== Release history ==
Region	Date	Label	Format	Catalog
United States	1994	Atlantic	CD, CS, LP	7567-82589
Canada	1994	Atlantic	CD, CS, LP	78 25894
