= Bradford Reed =

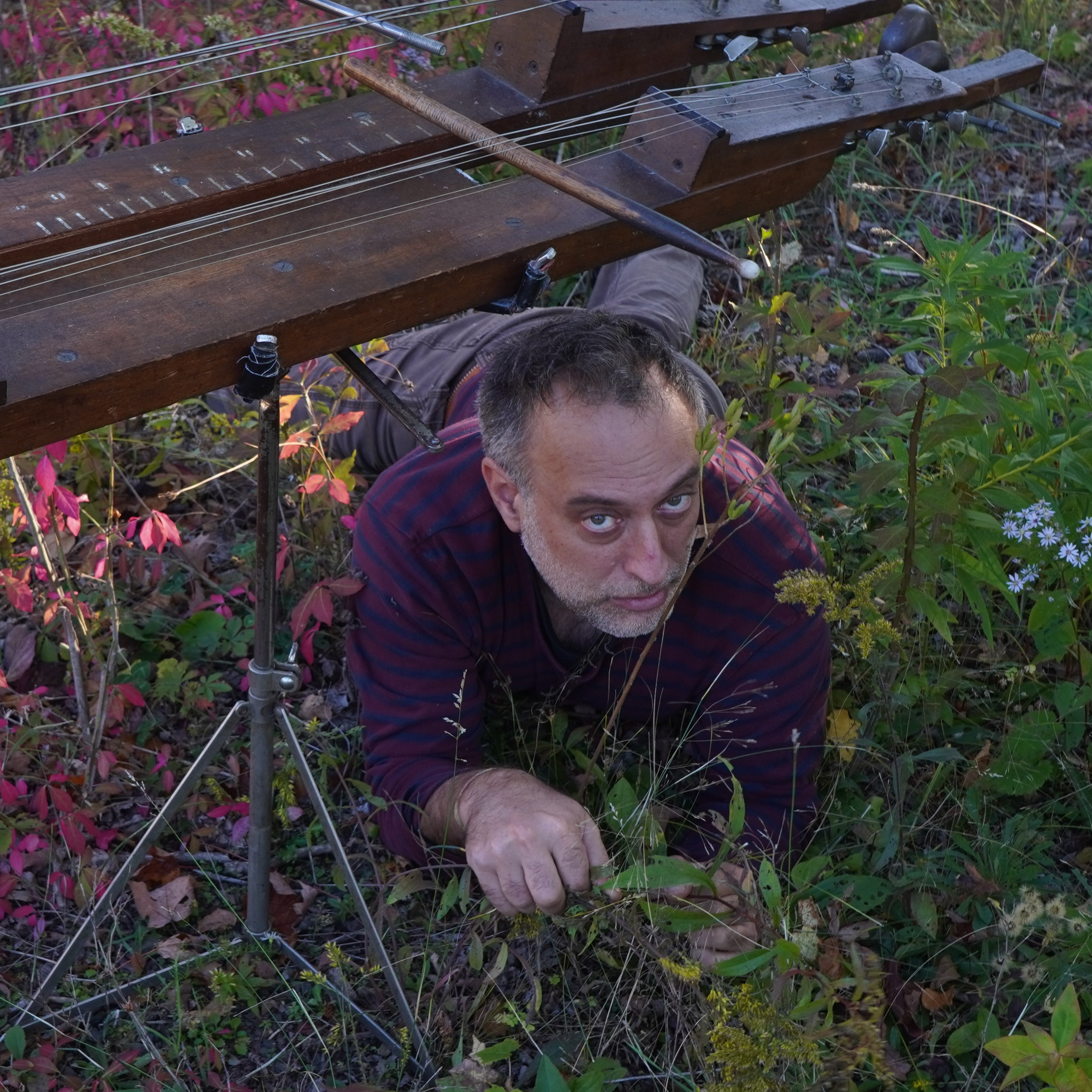

Background information
- Born: April 14, 1969 (age 56); New York
- Genres: Experimental
- Occupation(s): Musician, Composer, Songwriter, Producer
- Instrument(s): Bells, drums, drum programming, guitar, kranton, melodica, organ, pencilina, percussion, piano, sampler, synthesizer, vocals
- Years active: 30
- Labels: Manifatture Criminali, Shimmy Disc, Instinct

Bradford Reed is an American multi-instrumentalist, experimental luthier, and member of the avant-garde band King Missile III. In the 1980s he invented the pencilina, a custom made string instrument.

== Discography ==
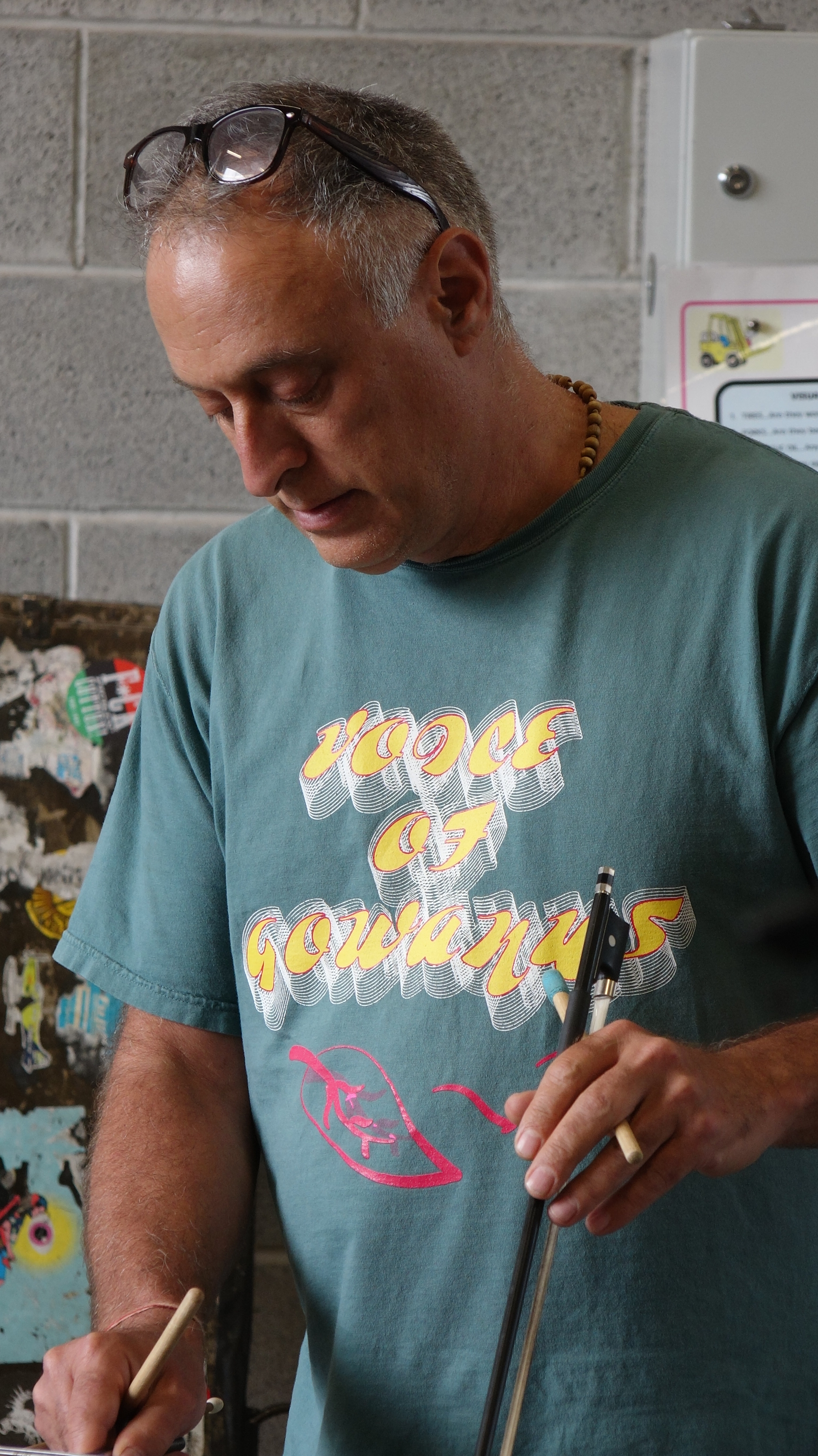
Reed at the unveiling of the Mucky statue in Gowanus

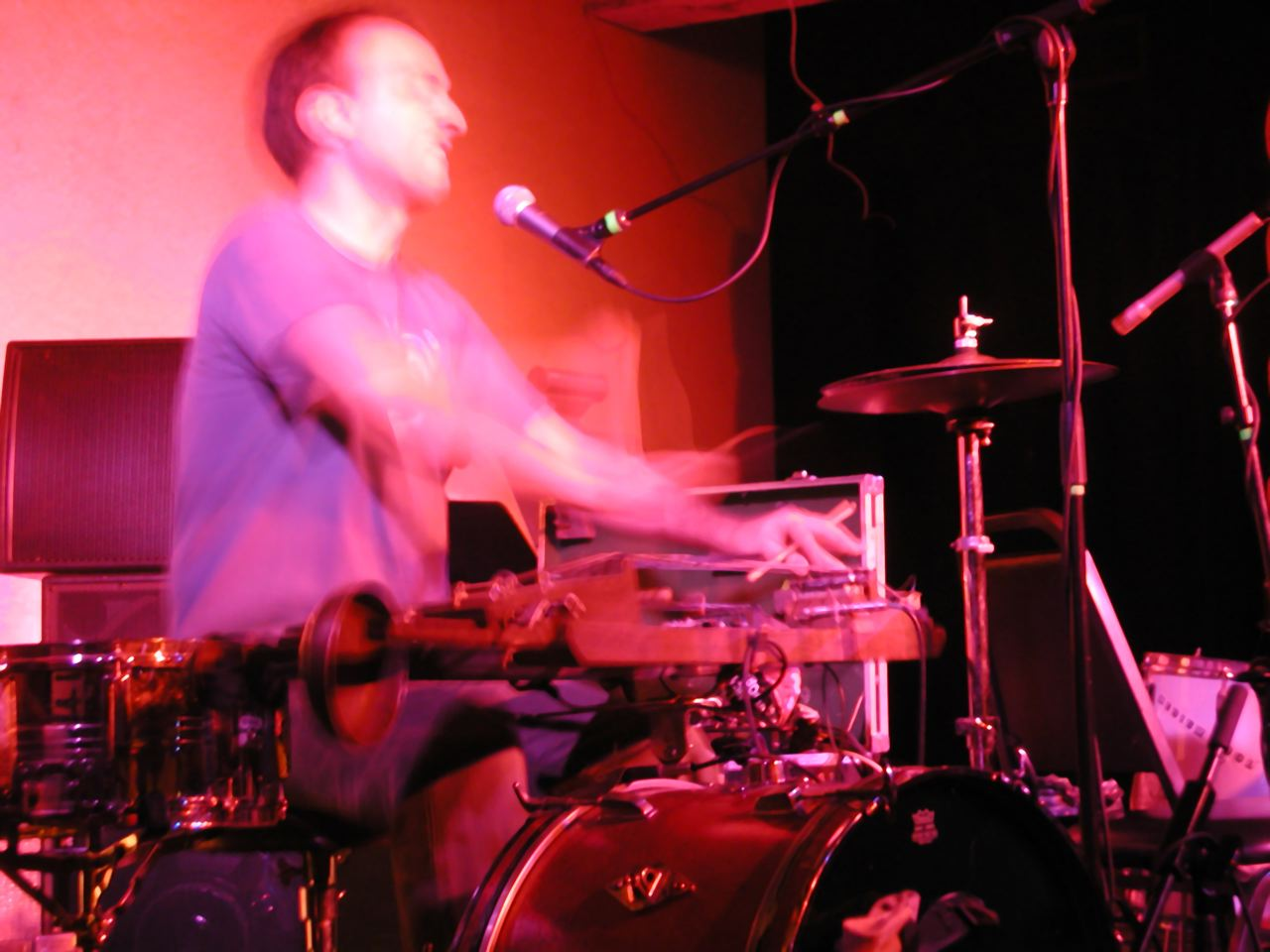
Inventor Bradford Reed playing his pencilina

| Artist | Album | Record label | Release year |
|---|---|---|---|
| Bradford Reed | Ultra Fresh Super Vibe | Ft.Lb. Records | 1992 |
| Bradford Reed | Live! At Home | Ft.Lb. Records | 1996 |
| John S. Hall | The Body Has a Head | Manifatture Criminali | 1996 |
| King Missile III | Failure | Shimmy Disc | 1998 |
| Bradford Reed and Hoppy Kamiyama | The Bubbleman | Horen | 1999 |
| Bradford Reed and Hoppy Kamiyama | The Bubbleman 2 (A Day of the Iron Sausage) | Consipio/God Ocean | 2000 |
| Bradford Reed | The Stars My Destination | Ft.Lb. Records | 2001 |
| Bradford Reed | Solo Live Songs | Ft.Lb. Records | 2003 |
| King Missile III | The Psychopathology of Everyday Life | Instinct Records | 2003 |
| King Missile III | Royal Lunch | Important Records | 2004 |
| OHMSLICE | Conduit | Imaginator Records | 2017 |
| Bradford Reed | What's Good for the Goose Is Good | Youngbloods | 2019 |
| Satellite and the Harpoonist | Satellite Man | Tonic Records | 2020 |
| The Dirt Whisperers | The Dirt Whisperers | Tonic Records | 2023 |
| Bradford Reed | Petal Tones | Ft. Lb, Recordings | 2026 |

== Pencilina ==
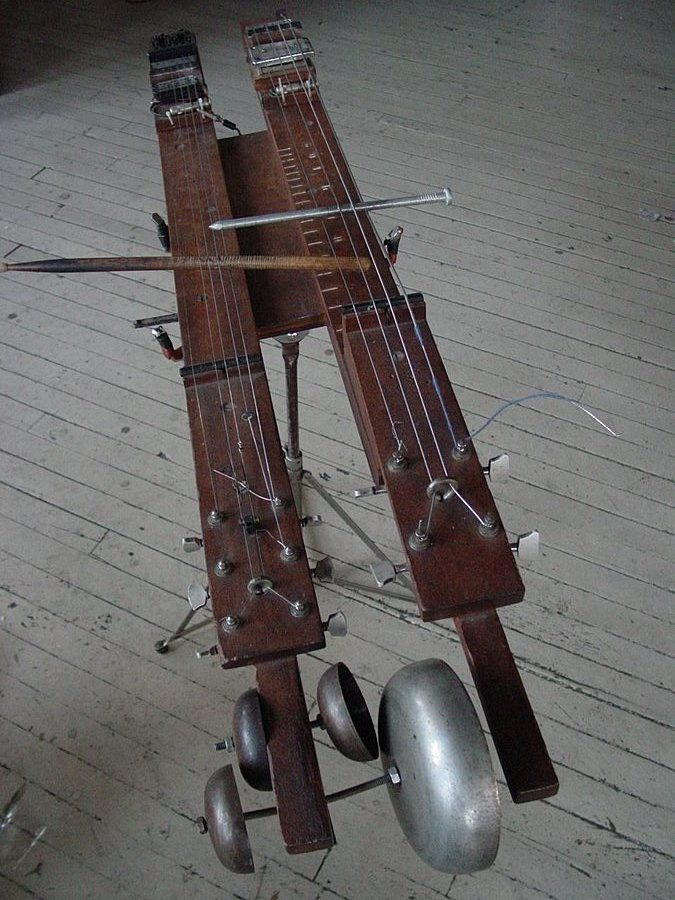
the pencilina

The pencilina is a custom-made string instrument that Reed invented in the 1980s. The instrument is a double neck 3rd bridge guitar.

The pencilina is similar in construction to two long connected thin zithers. Its two "necks" each have a bridge, tuning pegs, and a set of strings; six strings on one neck and four on the other. Both are open tuned. The treble tuning is adjustable via a multiple tuning bridge. Wedged over and under the strings is a wooden drum stick for the treble/alto/tenor strings and a metal rod for the bass strings, which divide each string into two segments with different pitches. The divided strings can be then played separately, resulting in various harmonic overtones. There are four built-in pickups: two are contact mics mounted in the bridges at one end of each neck, and two are guitar-style electromagnetic pickups which are placed under the strings toward the opposite end. It's played by striking its strings with sticks and may also be plucked or bowed.

The Pencilina was featured on the book/album Orbitones, Spoonharps and Bellowphones (Elipsis Arts) and is described in Nice Noise by Bart Hopkin and Yuri Landman.
