= Fluting on the Hump =

Studio album by King Missile (Dog Fly Religion)
- Released: 1987
- Recorded: Noise New York (New York City, New York)
- Genre: Alternative rock; experimental rock
- Length: 22:35
- Label: Shimmy Disc
- Producer: Kramer

King Missile chronology
Fluting on the Hump (1987)	They (1988)

Fluting on the Hump is the first album by avant-garde band King Missile (Dog Fly Religion), first released exclusively in LP format in 1987 and later included on the CD compilation Mystical Shit & Fluting on the Hump.

== Reception ==
Professional ratings
Review scores
Source	Rating
AllMusic	2/5 stars

AllMusic awarded Fluting on the Hump two out of five stars.

== Track listing ==
Side one
No.	Title	Length
1.	"Lou"	1:54
2.	"At Dave's"	2:01
3.	"Muffy"	2:29
4.	"Take Stuff From Work"	2:13
5.	"Sensitive Artist"	2:39

Side one
No.	Title	Length
1.	"Wuss"	1:42
2.	"Heavy Holy Man"	2:13
3.	"Pygmies & Drums"	0:27
4.	"Fluting on the Hump"	2:26
5.	"Dick"	2:19
6.	"That Old Dog"	2:12

== Personnel ==
Adapted from the Fluting on the Hump liner notes.

King Missile

- John S. Hall – lead vocals
- Dogbowl – guitar, backing vocals
- Alex DeLaszlo – bass, harmonica, saxophone, backing vocals
- R.B. Korbet – drums, backing vocals; lead vocals on "Heavy Holy Man"

Additional performers

- George O'Malley – xylophone, chimes, shouting

Production and design

- Mark Kramer – mixing, engineering

== Release history ==
Region	Date	Label	Format	Catalog
United States	1987	Shimmy Disc	LP	SHIMMY-00003
Netherlands	1987	Shadowline	LP	SR 6987
