= John S. Hall =

American poet, author, singer and lawyer (born 1960)

- Born: John Charles Hall; September 2, 1960 (age 66); Brooklyn, New York, U.S.
- Occupations: Poet, author, singer, lawyer
- Writing career
- Years active: 1981–present
- Genres: Performance poetry, spoken word, free verse
- Movements: Avant-garde, absurdist, postmodernist, comedy rock
- Website: kingmissile.com

John S. Hall (born John Charles Hall, September 2, 1960) is an American poet, author, singer and lawyer perhaps best known for his work with King Missile, an avant-garde band that he co-founded in 1986 and has since led in various incarnations.

== Biography ==
=== Early life ===
John S. Hall was born in Brooklyn, New York and grew up in Manhattan's West Village. He recalls being "very quiet and shy" as a child and a social outcast as an adolescent. In 1978 he graduated from Stuyvesant High School.

=== Participation in poetry scene ===
In the early 1980s, Hall began participating in the Lower East Side poetry scene. He read his poems at such venues as Speakeasy and ABC No Rio. According to performance poet Cristin O'Keefe Aptowicz, Hall "became an easily recognizable figure in the scene: pale, bald, dressed mostly in black and white, with wire-rimmed glasses and a porkpie hat."

Hall has long been a vocal opponent of slam poetry, taking issue with its competitive nature and what he considers its lack of stylistic diversity. In a 2005 interview, he recalled seeing his first slam, at the Nuyorican Poets Café:

I hated it. And it made me really uncomfortable and... it was very much like a sporting event, and I was interested in poetry in large part because it was like the antithesis of sports.... [I]t seemed to me like a very macho, masculine form of poetry and not at all what I was interested in.

Despite his reservations about slam poetry, Hall has performed alongside slam poets on such television programs as PBS's The United States of Poetry, MTV's Spoken Word Unplugged, and HBO's Russell Simmons Presents Def Poetry.

=== Early bands ===
Hall performed in at least two musical groups before co-founding King Missile. One was Purple Sunshine, a "hippie band" Hall started because he "was really into hippies and LSD, and tuning in and dropping out, and all that stuff." The other was You Suck, which Hall says was inspired by a band led by punk musician Mykel Board:

[Board]'s band blew my mind. The idea of having someone in the band that didn't sing or play an instrument was a revelation to me. Within a year, I had, with some friends, developed a band called You Suck, where most of the people on stage didn't play an instrument. Like there was a guy who did a Rubik's Cube, or a couple of people playing chess, or a guy with a dead fish on the end of a fishing line which he waved around the audience, or whatever. If you had some visual idea and cared to join us, we would let you. Over the course of a little over a year, over 100 people performed in You Suck. Mykel came to our first show and said that his face hurt from laughing so much. He ended up producing our only single and releasing it on his label: "The You Suck Chant" [backed with] "Get the Fuck off the Stage." It was weird, because those were practically our only original songs: we were a cover band. We would do any bad song we could think of...

Over the band's objections, Board released the You Suck single with a pornographic album cover. The single was not a commercial success, and the band broke up shortly after its release.

=== King Missile ===
In 1985, Hall began presenting his work at open mic poetry readings. After three shows, he became a "featured" poet at the Backfence, a performance space just west of LaQuardia on Bleeker Street in Manhattan's West Village. In 1986, feeling that "20 minutes of me reading poetry would be totally boring", Hall asked his guitarist friend Dogbowl to augment his performances with original music. Dogbowl agreed, and, with the addition of bassist Alex DeLaszlo, drummer R. B. Korbet, and xylophonist George O'Malley, King Missile (Dog Fly Religion) was born. The band released two albums on the Shimmy Disc label, 1987's Fluting on the Hump and 1988's They, and then dissolved because Dogbowl wanted to pursue a solo career.

After Dogbowl's departure, Hall asked Bongwater guitarist Dave Rick to help him put together a new band. Rick recruited multi-instrumentalist Chris Xefos, and Hall retained They drummer Steve Dansiger. Hall dubbed the new lineup King Missile, dropping the parenthetical "Dog Fly Religion" subtitle "since that was [Dogbowl's] idea." The band recorded the album Mystical Shit in late 1989 and early 1990 and released it in 1990 on Shimmy Disc. On the strength of the single "Jesus Was Way Cool", the album hit #1 on the CMJ charts, and the band was signed by a major label, Atlantic Records. This series of events led Hall to make a habit of joking, "'Jesus' got me signed to Atlantic Records." Shortly after getting signed, Hall released an album on Shimmy Disc with Atlantic's permission: Real Men, a side project recorded with producer and Shimmy Disc founder Mark Kramer. King Missile is featured in the 1990 documentary CutTime, which chronicles the East Village music scene at the time.

King Missile recorded three albums for Atlantic: 1991's The Way to Salvation, 1992's Happy Hour, and 1994's King Missile. Happy Hour spawned a modest hit in "Detachable Penis," which reached No. 25 on the Billboard Modern Rock Tracks chart. Nonetheless, after the commercial failure of King Missile, the band was dropped from Atlantic, and they broke up shortly thereafter because, according to Hall, "there was no reason to stay together."

In 1996, Hall released a "solo album", The Body Has a Head, on the German label Manifatture Criminali. The album featured considerable input from multi-instrumentalists Sasha Forte, Bradford Reed, and Jane Scarpantoni. With them, as well as They cellist Charles Curtis, Hall formed a new band, King Missile III (pronounced "the third"). In 1998, the new lineup released its "debut" album, Failure, on Shimmy Disc. Curtis and Scarpantoni left the band after its release, and King Missile III continued as a trio, releasing two more albums, 2003's The Psychopathology of Everyday Life and 2004's Royal Lunch.

In 2015, Hall formed a new lineup of King Missile, King Missile IV, with the band LoveyDove. They toured New Zealand and released an EP, This Fuckin' Guy, on Powertool Records. King Missile's classic lineup also reunited for live shows in 2015, continuing through 2016 and 2017.

In 2016, Hall started two new bands: Unusual Squirrel and Sensation Play. Unusual Squirrel released its debut album, Fuck Sandwich, on Bandcamp.

In 2019, King Missile IV changed their name to You, Me and This Fuckin’ Guy and recorded its debut LP, Garden Variety Fuckers, released by Dromedary Records on April 17, 2020.

In 2023, King Missile (Dog Fly Religion) began performing again. A new album, Quest For Fire, is forthcoming. The band is Hall, Dogbowl, Korbet (playing bass instead of drums), and percussionists Marlon Cherry and Susan Hwang.

=== Books ===
Hall has released two books, both on Soft Skull Press. The first, 1997's Jesus Was Way Cool, is a collection of 40 poems recorded on King Missile and Hall solo albums, plus a never-recorded poem, "Hope."

The second, 2007's Daily Negations, is a dark-humored satire of self-help books. In it, Hall presents a negative thought for each day of the year (including Leap Day). He posts daily readings of these thoughts on his Facebook and Instagram pages.

Beginning in October of 2020, Hall has published at least one new poem a day on social media. Beginning in 2022, He has published monthly books of these poems, all of which are available on Amazon.

=== Dominant themes of work ===
Asked in a 2003 interview to speak about the common themes of his work, Hall replied:

I think these are some of the common themes: (a) life is hard, brutal, capricious and unfair, (b) sometimes there is a benefit to seeing it clearly, and acknowledging it truthfully..., and c) other times it is best to find something to laugh about, lest despair crush one completely. I find a lot of humor in shocking or so-called taboo things: castration, excrement, violence (usually self-inflicted or inflicted on the narrator, "[Martin] Scorsese" being an exception), sex and sexual perversions... etc.

Other recurring subjects of Hall's work include religion and spirituality (e.g., "The Fish That Played the Ponies", "Jesus Was Way Cool," "The God"), nihilism (e.g., "No Point", "Ed," "Jim"), and masochism (e.g., "Pickaxe", "Take Me Home," "My Lover").

=== Writing and performance styles ===
Hall's writing varies in format from straightforward narrative to abstract, disjointed free verse. The writing frequently contains absurdist imagery (e.g., "A giant testicle rolled over a Waffle House, killing several clowns") and/or adynata (e.g., "Pigeons came along and ate his eyes, and seagulls ripped his stomach out, and pelicans ate his liver, and his spleen popped out all on its own and turned into a harmonica and played a pleasant little tune. Then out came his pancreas, which turned into the dog that bit him last week, and it bit him again and again and again many times").

Hall's performance style is also eclectic, his delivery ranging from a deadpan monotone to melodic tenor singing to overwrought screaming. In a 1998 interview, Hall expressed a preference for his spoken material over his sung: "Most of my work that I prefer is this type, and in most cases, the singing stuff [on albums] is filler, with the exception of songs here and there... [F]or the most part, I'm better at the spoken shit."

=== Stage name ===
In a 2003 missive to his electronic mailing list, Hall explained how he chose his stage name:

[M]y stage name is John S. Hall, my original born name is John Charles Hall, but my friends, enemies, and stalkers call me John Hall. What's the deal with the S? Well, when I was 15, I didn't like the way John C. Hall looked, so I wanted to change it. I was named after my grandfather, Charles Syjefroi Boileau, so I was given the choice of John B. Hall (which looked odd to me when I was 15, but now looks kind of fresh) or John S. Hall, which looked a lot better, so that's what I chose. It was several years before I realized that some people would think it was a deliberate pun on the word "asshole." It wasn't.

=== Legal career ===
After the collapse of the second incarnation of King Missile, Hall attended law school. He graduated cum laude from the Benjamin N. Cardozo School of Law at Yeshiva University, and after graduation co-founded Heraty Hall, a law firm specializing in entertainment law. Hall later left the firm to go into solo practice until 2006, when he took a position as a corporate analyst at a law firm.

Asked whether he became a lawyer out of disillusionment with the contemporary poetry scene, Hall laughed and said, "I became a lawyer to make money."

=== Political and personal beliefs ===
Hall used his vehement dislike of President George W. Bush and his administration as subject matter for several King Missile III songs, including "The President", "Suggested Response to the Coming Crises", and "Another Political Poem". He campaigned for Democratic nominee John Kerry in the 2004 United States presidential election.

Hall considers himself both Buddhist and agnostic. On his MySpace page, he summarized his faith as follows: "I don't believe in God, but I do believe in something. I'm just not sure what."

Hall is also a vegan.

=== Family ===
Hall is the older brother of Francis Hall, better known as Faceboy, an actor, producer, and activist in New York City.

=== References in popular culture ===
American rapper MC Lars acknowledges Hall in his song "My Rhymes Rhyme": "Shout-outs to Wesley Willis, Adam G. and John Hall / Word to MC Paul Barman; hey, return my call!" Lars also praises King Missile in his song "The Dialogue": "Nine Inch Nails, Primus, "Weird Al" and King Missile / Influenced me like a postmodern epistle."

== Discography ==
=== With King Missile (Dog Fly Religion) ===
Album	Record Label	Release year
Fluting on the Hump	Shimmy Disc	1987
They	Shimmy Disc	1988

=== With King Missile ===
Album	Record Label	Release year
Mystical Shit	Shimmy Disc	1990
The Way to Salvation	Atlantic Records	1991
Happy 14½ (EP)	Atlantic	1992
Happy Hour	Atlantic	1992
King Missile	Atlantic	1994

=== With King Missile III ===
Album	Record Label	Release year
Failure	Shimmy Disc	1998
The Psychopathology of Everyday Life	Instinct Records	2003
Royal Lunch	Important Records	2004

=== With King Missile IV ===
Album	Record Label	Release year
This Fuckin' Guy	Powertool Records	2015

=== With Unusual Squirrel ===
Album	Record Label	Release year
Fuck Sandwich	Self-Released	2016

=== With Kramer ===
Album	Record Label	Release year
Real Men	Shimmy Disc	1991

=== Solo ===
Album	Record Label	Release year
The Body Has a Head	Manifatture Criminali	1996

== Bibliography ==
- Jesus Was Way Cool (Soft Skull Press, 1997)
- Daily Negations (Soft Skull Press, 2007)
