= LoveyDove =

American musical duo

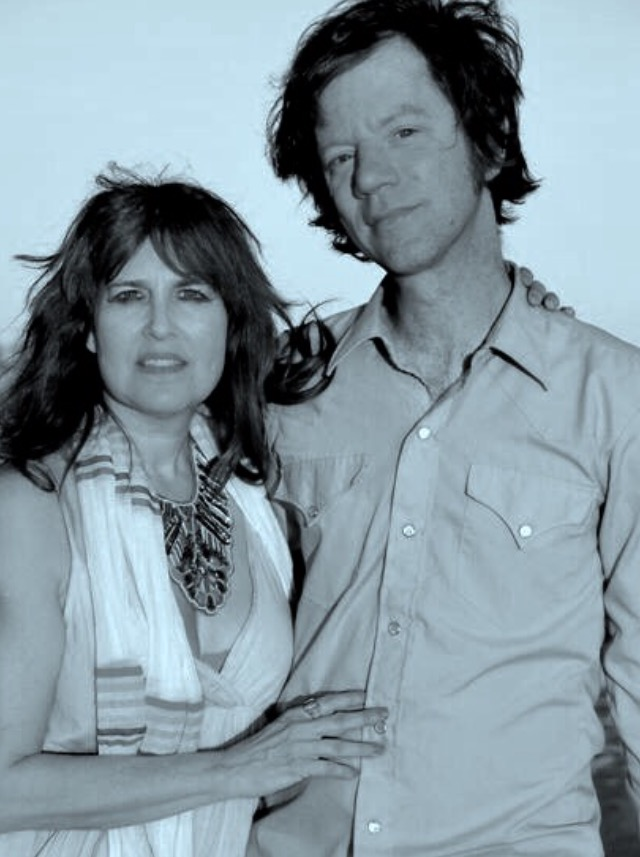
- LoveyDove

Background information
- Origin: Los Angeles, California, United States
- Genres: Pop rock
- Instruments: Piano, bass, guitar, drums, cello, upright bass, flute, clarinet, keyboards, percussion
- Years active: 2011-present
- Labels: LA's Fine, Records Ad Nauseam
- Members: Dan West; Azalia Snail

LoveyDove is an American pop rock band that formed in February 2011 by Philadelphia-born Azalia Snail and California native Dan West.

== History and style ==
LoveyDove is a musical duo of Dan West, guitars, keys and vocals, and Azalia Snail, keys, vocals and percussion. Their songs also feature drummer Jerry Buscek.

Azalia Snail is a solo psychedelic rock and roll artist whose career spans over 20 albums and singles. Dan West is an LA-based recording artist and studio musician. West and Snail met in Los Angeles and are a married couple. They chose the name LoveyDove after Snail wrote a song for West called "LoveyDove." He followed up with a song for her titled "Azalia's in Bloom."

LoveyDove has toured the United States, Europe and Australasia. They have also performed at multiple live venues in Los Angeles.

LoveyDove's first self-titled album was released in the U.S. in by LA's Fine. The album references Shakespeare, Brian Wilson, Sergio Mendes, and Burt Bacharach.

Their second album Showstopper was released in New Zealand by Powertool Records and in the U.S. by Records Ad Nauseam.

In the fall of 2021, Union Pole Records released the follow up to 2015’s Snail Meets West entitled, Snail Meets West, Again!

LoveyDove released their third album May 27, 2022 entitled, Rude Dawgs.

LoveyDove recorded the track Bernie's Air in support of U.S. presidential candidate Bernie Sanders.

=== Dick Van Dyke ===
In 2023, LoveyDove befriended entertainer Dick Van Dyke and his wife, Arlene. Since then, Azalia Snail has become the resident DJ at their Vandy Camp events, both at their home in Malibu, and at the Dick and Arlene Van Dyke Theatre and Dreamland in Malibu. West has accompanied Van Dyke and his band The Vantastix on piano at many of these same events.

== Discography ==
Year	Title	Label	Other Artist(s)
2013	Backward Bully	Independent	
2014	LoveyDove	LA's Fine (US)	
2014	Luka Fisher	Records Ad Nauseam (US)	
2015	ShowStopper	Records Ad Nauseam (US) Powertool Records (NZ)	King Missile, John S. Hall, Cellars
2015	Snail Meets West	Union Pole	
2015	Bernie's Air (Single)	Independent	
2015	Lou Reed (Don't Leave)	Chute Records	
2000	Snail Meets West	Union Pole Records	
2022	Rude Dawgs	Wayside Records	
