= Hypnolovewheel =

Hypnolovewheel was an American indie rock band from Long Island. Despite positive critical reviews, the band's albums were never particularly successful, and they split in 1993. Band's members include Stephen Hunking (guitar and vocals) Dan Cuddy (bass and vocals), Peter Walsh (drums and vocals) Dave Ramirez (guitar and vocals). Dave Ramirez occasionally played with King Missile and later played with Dump.

Current bands featuring members of Hypnolovewheel include The Special Pillow, Dew-Claw, Electrostim and XL Kings. Pre Hypnolovewheel bands include The Plastic Device, Wayne Manor, The Snackmates and It.

== Discography ==
- Next Week (EP) (1987, Snatch-O-Matic Records)
- Turn! Turn! Burn! (1988, Fabian Aural Products)
- Candy Mantra (1990, Fabian Aural Products)
- Space Mountain (1991, Alias Records)
- Angel Food (1992, Alias Records)
- Altered States (1993, Alias Records)
- Peace of Mind (EP) (1993, Alias Records)
