= Stephen Tunney =

American artist (born 1959)

Stephen Tunney (born December 1959 in Bronx, New York) is an American artist who is a novelist, a painter and a musician.

== Education ==
Stephen Tunney graduated from Parsons School of Design with a BFA in 1982. He received an MFA from the City College of New York in 1991.

== Writer ==
Stephen Tunney's last novel One Hundred Percent Lunar Boy, was published by the American publisher MacAdam/Cage in 2010. It received the Barnes and Noble "Discover Great New Writers Series" for 2010–2011. One Hundred Percent Lunar Boy was translated into French and published in France by les Éditions Albin Michel (WIZ Collection) under the title "Quand on s'embrasse sur la Lune" in 2012. It has also been translated into Japanese and will be published in Japan by Tokyo Sogensha in 2013. A Russian translation will be available in 2013 from Azbooka-Atticus This novel is currently under film option by Timur Bekmambetov's production company Bazelevs. In 1992, came out his first novel Flan published by Four Walls Eight Windows. In 2008 Flan was re-published by Running Press. Flan was widely reviewed and appraised by magazines and newspapers such as New York Press, Boston Phoenix Literary Section, Review of Contemporary Fiction, Option, the San Francisco Chronicle, and Les Inrockuptibles among others.

== Painter ==
Tunney has exhibited widely in the United States as well as in Europe, France, Switzerland, England, Belgium and Spain. His artworks are primarily on two medium, canvas and paper, as well as on musical instruments such as guitars, cello, violin. His paintings and works on paper are either very colorful or black and white. They are very surreal, with many references to Renaissance masters as well modern cartoons and Japanese calligraphy.

His last show was in the : Kamarama Exhibition, Brugge Plus Group Show, Garemijn Hall (City Halls), Market Square, Brugge, Belgium, May–August 2012. Other artists included in this show were : David Bade, Fred Bervoetz, Capitaine Longchamps, Georges Condo, René Daniels, Wim Delvoye, Otto Dix, Marcel Duchamp, James Ensor, Max Ernst, Jan Fabre, J.J. Granville, George Groz, Kati Heck, Jeroen Henneman, Herr Seele, Paul Joostens, Kamagurka, Lucebert, Markus Lüpertz, René Magritte, Werner Mannaers, Muzo, Yves Obyn, Jeff Olsson, Francis Picabia, Pablo Picasso, Georges Ribemont-Dessaignes, Emile Salkin, Wim T. Schippers, Roland Topor, Luc Tuymas, Rinus Van de Velde, Don Van Vliet.

Other shows:

- Cinema Nova Gallery Solo Show, Solo Show, paintings and videos, Brussels, Belgium, October–November 2009.
- La Cartonnerie, Vortex #1, Group Show, painted guitar, and performance, Reims, France, February 2009.
- Society Of Illustrators 50th Anniversary Exhibition, Group Show, NYC, USA, March–April 2008.
- Rubulad At CSV Cultural Center, Group Show, NYC, September–October 2006
- Theater For The New City L.E.S. Visual Arts Show, Group Show, May–June 2006. Works on Paper.
- Centro Andaluz De Arte Contemporaneo, Andalusian Contemporary Art Centre supported by the Spanish Ministry of Culture, Seville, Spain. Group Show, Works on Paper and performance. July 2006
- Theater For The New City L.E.S. Visual Arts Show Group Show, New York City, May–June 2005, Works on paper.
- Coleman Project Space, Group Show, supported by the British Arts Council, London, UK, May 2005. Works on paper and performance.
- Confort Moderne, Solo Show, Paintings, Poitiers, France, March 2005.
- Open Walls Experiment—ISSUE Project Room, Group Show, NYC, May–June 2004
- Small Works 27th Exhibition, NYU Washington Square East Galleries, Group Show, Paintings, NYC, May–June 2004
- Galerie 7M3, Solo Show, in association with the Museum of Fine Arts, La Médiathèque, Mons, Belgium, April 2002. "First personn Shooters", Works on paper.
- Mégahertz Group Show, Attitudes Espace d'Arts Contemporains, Supported by the Swiss Ministry of Culture, Genève, Switzerland, May 2001. Works on paper.
- The Apartment Gallery, Group Show, NYC, July–August, 2000. Paintings.
- Studio 5 Beekman, Solo Show, Multimedia Installation, NYC, April 1997.
- The Wall Gallery, Solo Show, NYU Stern School of Business, May 1996, Paintings.
- Limner Gallery, "Salon Show", NYC, May 1992, Paintings.
- Limner Gallery, Emerging Artists Group Show, NYC, January 1992, Paintings.
- MFA Thesis Show, City College of New York, NYC, January 1991, Paintings.

Permanent Collections: He has several pieces in the Confort Modern Permanent collection in Poitiers, France and in the Kamagurka's private collection in Brugges, Belgium. His artwork has been sold to private customers in France, and the United States.

== Musician ==
Stephen Tunney is also a musician and a songwriter who under the name Dogbowl has released 12 albums in the United States, France and Belgium.

- Zone of Blue (62 TV Records, 2015)
- Dogbowl Live At CBGB 1985-1986 (Eyeball Planet, NYC, 2007)
- Songs For Narcisse (Eyeball Planet, NYC, 2005)
- Chien Lunatic (Eyeball Planet, NYC, 2003)
- The Best of Dogbowl (62TV Records, 2001, Brussels)
- Fantastic Carburetor Man (Eyeball Planet, NYC, 2001)
- The Zeppelin Record (Lithium/Labels-Virgin France 1998)
- Live on WFMU (Lithium/Labels-Virgin France 1995)
- Gunsmoke (Dogbowl & Kramer)(Shimmy-Disc, NYC 1995)
- Hot Day in Waco (Dogbowl & Kramer)(Shimmy-Disc, NYC 1994)
- Dogbowl and The Peter Parker Experience: Nuage, Nuage (Lithium/Labels-Virgin France, 1994)
- Project Success (Shimmy-Disc, NYC, 1993)
- Flan - Songs from the Novel by Stephen Tunney (Shimmy-Disc, NYC, 1992)
- Cyclops Nuclear Submarine Captain (Shimmy-Disc, NYC, 1991)
- Tit! (An Opera) (Shimmy-Disc, NYC, 1989)

Numerous articles have been written about the music of Stephen Tunney aka Dogbowl, in magazines and newspapers such as Les Inrockuptibles (Paris, Feature article), The Village Voice (NYC), Le Matin (Brussels), Melody Maker (London), Philadelphia City Paper, L.A. Weekly, Liberation (Paris), Q Magazine (U.K.), MOFO (Brussels), VOX Magazine (U.K.), Event (U.K.), etc.

== Other Links ==
www.stephentunney.org
