= Steve Dansiger =

American drummer

- Genres: Avant-garde
- Instruments: Drums, percussion
- Labels: Shimmy Disc
- Website: www.drdansiger.com

Steve Dansiger is an American drummer and member of the first two incarnations of avant-garde band King Missile and of the band Pianosaurus.

Dansiger is now a therapist and author with a doctorate in clinical psychology. Dansiger has appeared on comedian Marc Maron's WTF podcasts multiple times.

== Publications ==
• Dansiger, S (2016) Clinical Dharma - A Path for Healers and Helpers. StartAgain Media. ISBN 978-0692756522

• Dansiger, S, Marich J (2017) EMDR Therapy and Mindfulness for Trauma-Focused Care. Springer. ISBN 978-0826149145

• Dansiger, S, (2019) Mindfulness for Anger Management. Althea Press. ISBN 978-1641521673

== Discography ==
Artist	Album	Record label	Release year
Pianosaurus	Groovy Neighborhood	Rounder	1986
King Missile (Dog Fly Religion)	They	Shimmy Disc	1988
King Missile	Mystical Shit	Shimmy Disc	1990
Steve Dansiger	Sensation Days	Akeldama Records	1996
