= Happy Hour (King Missile album) =

Studio album by King Missile
- Released: December 15, 1992
- Genre: Alternative rock; experimental rock; noise rock; avant-garde
- Length: 60:00
- Label: Atlantic
- Producer: John S. Hall; Mark Kramer; Roger Murdock; Dave Rick; Steve Watson; Chris Xefos

King Missile chronology
The Way to Salvation (1991)	Happy Hour (1992)	King Missile (1994)

Singles from Happy Hour
- 1. "Detachable Penis" Released: 1992; 2. "Martin Scorsese" Released: 1992; 3. "(Why Are We) Trapped?" Released: 1993

Happy Hour is the fifth studio album by experimental music band King Missile, and released on December 15, 1992, by Atlantic Records. The album is exactly one hour long, hence its title.

== Reception ==
Professional ratings
Review scores
Source	Rating
AllMusic	4/5 stars
Entertainment Weekly	A
Rolling Stone	3/5 stars
Spin Alternative Record Guide	8/10
The Village Voice	(choice cut)

Ned Raggett of AllMusic wrote that "due in part to the return of Kramer to production – or in this case co-production – duties, along with a slew of more immediately memorable songs, Happy Hour trumps The Way to Salvation as the peak of the band's high-profile days, an inspired collection of tunes ranging from deranged pop to full-on epic metal stomp." The critic also said "thanks to a catchy arrangement via Rick's clipped, stuttered guitar riff and the sweetly sung title phrase in the background, the result is giddy left-field nonsense." and "it's the blessed liveliness of the whole album – at a premium in the days of full-on grunge when it came out, still rare enough years later – that makes it stand up so well." Trouser Press said "Hall's surreal accounts have the vivid sense of purpose previously absent; he’s not aiming at eliciting wan smiles, he’s trying to provoke intelligent thought" and "meanwhile, the band (drummer Roger Murdock is that new face in the booklet photo) locks into diverse rock grooves that would be worth hearing even without the vocals." Robert Christgau chose the band's hit single "Detachable Penis" as the album's "choice cut".

== Track listing ==
All lyrics are written by John S. Hall.

No.	Title	Music	Length
1.	"Intro"	John S. Hall; Roger Murdock; Dave Rick; Chris Xefos	0:11
2.	"Sink"	Hall; Murdock; Rick	3:00
3.	"Martin Scorsese"	Hall; Murdock; Rick	1:57
4.	"(Why Are We) Trapped?"	Murdock	4:30
5.	"It's Saturday"	Hall; Murdock; Rick; Xefos	2:33
6.	"VvV (VulvaVoid)"	Hall; Murdock; Rick; Xefos	3:24
7.	"Metanoia"	Hall; Murdock; Rick; Xefos	3:20
8.	"Detachable Penis"	Hall; Murdock; Rick; Xefos	3:22
9.	"Take Me Home"	Murdock; Rick; Xefos	6:16
10.	"Ed"	Murdock; Rick; Xefos	6:01
11.	"Anywhere"	Rick	3:33
12.	"The Evil Children"	Murdock; Rick; Xefos	5:47
13.	"Glass"	Hall	0:23
14.	"And"	Hall; Murdock; Rick; Xefos	2:49
15.	"King Murdock"	Hall; Murdock	0:54
16.	"I'm Sorry"	Murdock; Rick; Xefos	3:03
17.	"Heaven"	Murdock	3:14
18.	"Happy Hour"	Murdock; Rick; Xefos	5:39

== Personnel ==
Adapted from the Happy Hour liner notes.

King Missile

- John S. Hall – lead vocals, production
- Dave Rick – guitar, production
- Roger Murdock – drums, percussion, keyboards, Emulator, production, guitar (17)
- Chris Xefos – bass guitar, keyboards, percussion, backing vocals, production

Additional performers

- Mal Rick – clarinet (17)

Production and design

- Annalisa – photography
- Tom Bouman – design
- Jola Hesselberth – cover art
- Ron Jaramillo – design
- Mark Kramer – production, Mellotron (9), bass guitar (17)
- Inge Schaap – art direction
- Steve Watson – production, assistant engineering

== Charts ==
Chart performance for Happy Hour
Chart (1993)	Peak position
Australian Albums (ARIA)	93

== Release history ==
Region	Date	Label	Format	Catalog
United States	1992	Atlantic	CD, CS	7567-82459
Canada	1992	Atlantic	CD	7567-82459
Germany	1992	Atlantic	CD	7567-82459
Japan	1993	Atlantic	CD	AMCY-549
