= King Missile =

American rock band

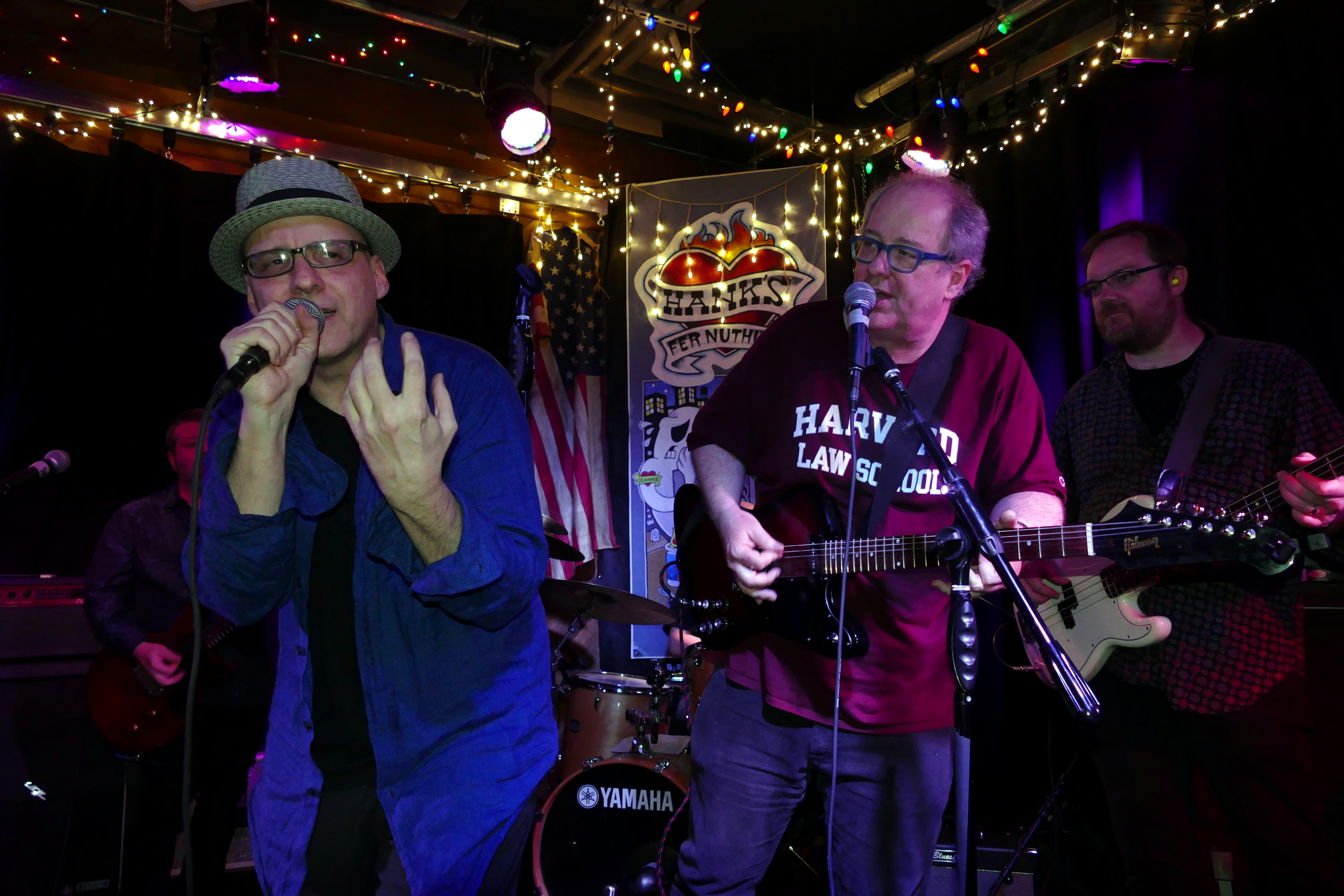
- King Missile performing in 2019

Background information
- Also known as: King Missile (Dog Fly Religion), King Missile III, King Missile IV
- Origin: New York City, United States
- Genres: Art rock; avant-garde
- Years active: 1986–present
- Labels: Shimmy, Atlantic, Instinct, Important, Needlejuice
- Spinoffs: Bongwater; Hypnolovewheel
- Members: John S. Hall; Dogbowl; R. B. Korbet; Susan Hwang; Marlon Cherry
- Past members: Alex DeLaszlo; George O'Malley; Steve Dansiger; Charles Curtis; Dave Rick; Chris Xefos; David Ramirez; Roger Murdock; Jane Scarpantoni; Sasha Forte; Bradford Reed; Dan West; Azalia Snail; Brent Cordero

King Missile is an American avant-garde art rock band best known for its 1992 humorous single "Detachable Penis". Vocalist John S. Hall has fronted several disparate incarnations of the group since founding it in 1986.

== History ==
=== King Missile (Dog Fly Religion) ===
In 1985, writer John S. Hall began presenting his work at open mic poetry readings. After three shows, Hall became a "featured" poet at the Backfence, a performance venue in Manhattan's Greenwich Village. In 1986, feeling that "20 minutes of me reading poetry would be totally boring", Hall asked his guitarist friend Dogbowl (Stephen Tunney) to augment his performances with original music. Dogbowl agreed, and with the addition of bassist Alex DeLaszlo, drummer R. B. Korbet, and xylophonist George O'Malley, King Missile (Dog Fly Religion) was born.

In 1987, the band went to the Noise New York studio and in just ten hours recorded and mixed its debut album, Fluting on the Hump. The producer/engineer, Kramer, released the album on his then-fledgling label, Shimmy Disc. The label sent the album to every college radio station that reported to College Media Journal, and the album subsequently performed well on the CMJ charts.

In 1988, Hall and Dogbowl, along with cellist Charles Curtis and new drummer Steve Dansiger, recorded the second King Missile (Dog Fly Religion) album, the longer, more experimental, less "jokey" They. Like its predecessor, the album was produced by Kramer and released on Shimmy Disc. According to Hall, "[the album] wasn't well received. Dogbowl was itching to make his own records, so we went our separate ways." Dogbowl went on to record several albums for Shimmy Disc.

In September 2023, Hall, Dogbowl, Korbet (now on bass), and DeLaszlo were joined by percussionists Susan Hwang and Marlon Cherry for a performance, at the City Winery Loft in New York City. The following year, Hall, Dogbowl, Korbet, Hwang, and Cherry began work on a new King Missile (Dog Fly Religion) album, to be released in 2026.

=== King Missile ===
After Dogbowl's departure, Hall asked Bongwater guitarist Dave Rick to help him put together a new band. Rick recruited multi-instrumentalist Chris Xefos, and Hall retained Dansiger on drums. Hall dubbed the new lineup King Missile, dropping the parenthetical "Dog Fly Religion" subtitle "since that was [Dogbowl's] idea." In late 1989 and early 1990, the band recorded the album Mystical Shit, and in 1990 released it on Shimmy Disc. On the strength of the single "Jesus Was Way Cool", the album hit No. 1 on the CMJ charts, and the band was signed by a major label, Atlantic Records. This series of events led Hall to make a habit of joking, "'Jesus' got me signed to Atlantic Records." Around this time, King Missile was featured in the 1990 documentary CutTime, which chronicled the East Village music scene of the late 1980s.

Another lineup change occurred before the recording of King Missile's major-label debut, as Dansiger left the band and was replaced on drums by Hypnolovewheel member David Ramirez. The subsequent album, The Way to Salvation, was released on April 16, 1991, and reached No. 2 on the CMJ charts. Atlantic promoted the album with the release of a single, "My Heart Is a Flower", and accompanying video.

After Ramirez left the group and was replaced by yet another drummer, Roger Murdock, the band recorded a cover of R.E.M.'s song "Get Up" for the album, Surprise Your Pig: A Tribute to R.E.M., released on June 22, 1992. This was followed by the band's second major-label album, Happy Hour, released on December 15, 1992. The album debuted at No. 1 on the CMJ charts, and its accompanying first single, "Detachable Penis", became a modest hit, reaching No. 25 on the Billboard Modern Rock Tracks chart. Atlantic released videos for "Detachable Penis" and the subsequent singles "(Why Are We) Trapped?" and "Martin Scorsese", but neither follow-up single achieved the chart success of "Detachable Penis." According to Hall, the band realized that its hit song had drawn in many casual fans who didn't care about the rest of the group's material; thus, the band began to play the song "early in the set, so that the people who didn't like us could leave, and we could play for the people who cared. That worked out well. People did leave."

In 1993, the band contributed a song titled "Our Jungle" to the soundtrack of the film Surf Ninjas starring Ernie Reyes, Jr., Rob Schneider, Nicolas Cowan and Leslie Nielsen.

The band's third and final album for Atlantic was the eponymous King Missile, released April 19, 1994. Neither the album nor its lead single, "Love Is...", was a commercial success; consequently, the band was dropped from Atlantic, and broke up shortly thereafter because, according to Hall, "there was no reason to stay together."

=== King Missile III ===
After the collapse of the second incarnation of King Missile, Hall decided to attend law school. He graduated cum laude from the Benjamin N. Cardozo School of Law in Manhattan, and after graduation co-founded Heraty Hall, a firm specializing in entertainment law.

In 1996, Hall released a "solo album", The Body Has a Head, on the German label Manifatture Criminali. The album featured considerable input from multi-instrumentalists Sasha Forte, Bradford Reed, and Jane Scarpantoni. With these musicians, as well as They cellist Curtis, Hall formed a new band, King Missile III. On September 15, 1998, the new lineup released its "debut" album, Failure, on Shimmy Disc.

Curtis and Scarpantoni left the band after the release of Failure, and King Missile III continued as a trio, releasing two more albums: The Psychopathology of Everyday Life (Instinct Records, January 21, 2003) and Royal Lunch (Important Records, September 21, 2004).

=== King Missile IV ===
In September 2014, John S. Hall performed four shows with the band LoveyDove in Los Angeles. It was later decided that this was, in fact, a new incarnation of King Missile, and they settled on the name King Missile IV. This version of the group toured New Zealand in February 2015, and recorded a six-song EP, This Fuckin' Guy, released on Powertool Records. In 2019, King Missile IV changed their name to You, Me and This Fuckin’ Guy and recorded their debut LP, Garden Variety Fuckers, released by Dromedary Records on April 17, 2020.

=== Reunions ===
Hall reunited with Dogbowl in 1995 for a tour as King Missile (Dog Fly Religion) for most of October and November of that year. The tour featured Hall performing spoken word with Sasha Forte on violin, followed by performance by Dogbowl and his band, and featuring Hall, Forte, Dogbowl and his band all performing together as King Missile (Dog Fly Religion) to headline the shows. On March 18, 2010, Hall reunited with Dogbowl as King Missile (Dog-Fly Religion) for a one-time performance at Le Poisson Rouge in New York City. Multi-instrumentalist John Kruth, bassist Dave Dreiwitz of Ween, and drummer Billy Ficca of Television joined the duo to round out the lineup.

On June 25, 2015, Hall, Rick, and Murdock reunited for the first time in over twenty years for a performance at Shea Stadium in Bushwick, Brooklyn. They were joined by Rachel Swaner on keyboards and accordion. The set consisted of songs from throughout the various King Missile incarnations. Hall, Rick, and Murdock played several more shows along with keyboardist Brent Cordero between 2015 and 2019. On February 18, 2017, keyboardist and bassist Chris Xefos rejoined the group for a performance at The Gutter Bar in Brooklyn. On February 10, 2018, King Missile, featuring the lineup of Hall, Rick, Murdock, Cordero and Korbet performed at a benefit for radio station, WFDU at Rose Gold in Brooklyn. A show at Bowery Electric in New York City followed on June 21, 2018, featuring the lineup of Hall, Rick, Murdock, Cordero, and Korbet. On May 11, 2019, King Missile performed with Hall, Rick, Murdock, Cordero, and Matt Hunter at Hank's Saloon in Brooklyn. Dogbowl performed an opening set and also joined King Missile on stage for several songs.

On July 11, 2025 the lineup of RB Korbet, Marlon Cherry, and Susan Hwang performed as King Missile (Dog Fly Religion) at Main Drag in Brooklyn, New York. The following September and October, Hall and Dogbowl, under the name King Missile (Dog Fly Religion), performed shows in Australia and New Zealand.

== Band members ==
=== King Missile (Dog Fly Religion) ===
1986-1988

- John S. Hall – lead vocals (1986-1988)
- Stephen Tunney (Dogbowl) – guitar, backing vocals (1986-1988)
- Alex DeLaszlo – bass guitar, woodwinds, backing vocals (1986-1987)
- R.B. Korbet – drums, vocals (1986-1987)
- George O'Malley – percussion, shouting (1986-1987)
- Charles Curtis – cello (1988)
- Steve Dansiger – drums, percussion (1988)

=== King Missile ===
1989-1994

- John S. Hall – lead vocals, occasional percussion (1989-1994), woodwinds (1990)
- Steve Dansiger – drums, percussion (1989-1991)
- Dave Rick – guitar, backing vocals (1989-1994)
- Chris Xefos – bass guitar, keyboards, percussion, backing vocals (1989-1994), woodwinds (1990)
- David Ramirez – drums, percussion (1991-1992)
- Roger Murdock - drums, percussion, keyboard, guitar (1992-1994)

=== King Missile III ===
1998-2004

- John S. Hall – lead vocals (1998-2004), percussion (2004)
- Charles Curtis – cello, guitar, backing vocals (1998)
- Jane Scarpantoni – cello, synthesizer (1998, 2004)
- Bradford Reed – pencilina, drums, percussion, keyboards, backing vocals (1998-2004), guitar (2004)
- Sasha Forte – violin, viola, bass guitar, backing vocals (1998-2004), keyboards (2003-2004)

=== King Missile IV/You, Me and This Fuckin’ Guy ===
2014-2020

- John S. Hall – lead vocals (2014-2020)
- Azalia Snail – omnichord, percussion, backing vocals (2014-2020)
- Dan West – bass guitar, guitar, effects, backing vocals (2014-2020)

== Studio discography ==
=== King Missile (Dog Fly Religion) ===
| Album | Record label | Release year |
|---|---|---|
| Fluting on the Hump | Shimmy Disc | 1987 |
| They | Shimmy Disc | 1988 |

=== King Missile ===
| Album | Record label | Release year |
|---|---|---|
| Mystical Shit | Shimmy Disc | 1990 |
| The Way to Salvation | Atlantic Records | 1991 |
| Happy 14½ (EP) | Atlantic | 1992 |
| Happy Hour | Atlantic | 1992 |
| King Missile | Atlantic | 1994 |

==== Compilation and soundtrack contributions ====
| Track | Album | Record label | Release year |
|---|---|---|---|
| "Doubleback Alley" (Rutles cover) | Rutles Highway Revisited | Shimmy Disc | 1990 |
| "We Can Work It Out" (Beatles cover) | Downtown Does the Beatles: Live at the Knitting Factory | Knitting Factory Works | 1992 |
| "Get Up" (R.E.M. cover) | Surprise Your Pig: A Tribute to R.E.M. | Staple Gun Records | 1992 |
| "Our Jungle" | Surf Ninjas: Original Soundtrack Album | Atlantic | 1993 |
| "Still the One" (Orleans cover) | 20 More Explosive Fantastic Rockin' Mega Smash Hit Explosions! | Pravda Records | 1994 |

=== King Missile III ===
| Album | Record label | Release year |
|---|---|---|
| Failure | Shimmy Disc | 1998 |
| The Psychopathology of Everyday Life | Instinct Records | 2003 |
| Royal Lunch | Important Records | 2004 |

=== King Missile IV/You, Me, and This Fuckin' Guy ===
| Album | Record label | Release year |
|---|---|---|
| This Fuckin' Guy (EP) | Dromedary Records | 2015 |
| Garden Variety Fuckers (album) | Powertool Records | 2020 |

=== Singles ===
| Title | Year | Peak chart positions | | | Album |
| Title | Year | US Alt. | AUS | NZ | Album |
|---|---|---|---|---|---|
| "My Heart Is a Flower" | 1991 | — | — | — | The Way to Salvation |
| "Detachable Penis" | 1992 | 25 | 17 | 13 | Happy Hour |
| "Martin Scorsese" | 1992 | — | — | — | Happy Hour |
| "(Why Are We) Trapped?" | 1993 | — | — | — | Happy Hour |
| "Love Is..." | 1994 | — | — | — | King Missile |
