= Chris Xefos =

American musician (born 1964)

- Born: January 5, 1964 (age 62)
- Genres: Avant-garde rock
- Instruments: Accordion, bass, keyboards, organ, percussion, piano, synthesizer, vocals
- Labels: Shimmy Disc; Atlantic Records
- Member of: Moth Wranglers
- Formerly of: King Missile, When People Were Shorter and Lived Near the Water
- Website: Xefos.com

Christopher Xefos (born January 5, 1964) is an American multi-instrumentalist musician/engineer/producer and former member of band King Missile. He plays various instruments such as accordion, bass, piano, and synthesizer, among others. He began recording/producing various groups in New York City during the 1980s, including indie-rock legends Phantom Tollbooth. In 1989, he joined the New York City avant-garde spoken word/art rock group King Missile. Five years, four albums and a number of alternative rock "hits" (including "Jesus Was Way Cool" and "Detachable Penis") later, King Missile disbanded (this version). Xefos also played with the group When People Were Shorter and Lived Near the Water during this time. Following this period, he relocated to San Francisco.

He then went on to work, in various capacities, with a number of local San Francisco singer/songwriters and groups, including Victor Krummenacher, Jonathan Segel, Greg Lisher (Camper Van Beethoven), Alison Faith Levy (The Loud Family/The Sippy Cups), Pansy Division, and Doug Hilsinger (Bomb/Enorchestra). He has also kept up on songwriting and recording with two different projects: Moth Wranglers, a duo featuring himself and LD Beghtol (Flare/The New Criticism/guest vocalist on The Magnetic Fields' 69 Love Songs) as well as his solo project, Drop Quarters.

Xefos lives in San Francisco, California. He is openly gay. Between 1998 and 2008, he owned/operated his own project-recording studio, Magnetic Recording. In 2008, he became co-owner/operator of a new recording facility, Dogpatch Recording. He does production/engineer work from this studio, as well as other studios in the San Francisco Bay Area. He continues to perform in local San Francisco music groups, including the Fat Bottom Girls, among others.

== Selected discography ==
Artist	Album	Record label	Release year
King Missile	Mystical Shit	Shimmy Disc	1990
King Missile	The Way to Salvation	Atlantic Records	1991
King Missile	Happy 14½ (EP)	Atlantic	1992
King Missile	Happy Hour	Atlantic	1992
King Missile	King Missile	Atlantic	1994
