= Dave Rick =

American musician

- Genres: Alternative rock, krautrock, noise rock, underground music
- Instruments: Guitar, bass, vocals
- Labels: Homestead Records; Shimmy Disc; Atlantic Records

David Matthew Rick is an American guitarist and former member of underground rock bands B.A.L.L., Bongwater, King Missile, Phantom Tollbooth, When People Were Shorter and Lived Near the Water, Wonderama, and Yo La Tengo. He is a member of Atlantic Drone, The Martinets, McLoud, Overcat, Stress Test and Wide Right. His latest band is Bob Carol Ted, which features artist/drummer Steve DiBenedetto

== Selected discography ==
Artist	Inst.	Release	Format	Label	Year
Atlantic Drone	g	Atlantic Drone	CD, MP3	Noiseville	2007
Atlantic Drone	g	A Vivified Sugar Cube Explains the Universe	LP	Circadia	2009
B.A.L.L	g	Trouble Doll	CD, CS, LP	Shimmy Disc	1989
Bongwater	g	Double Bummer	2xCD, 2xLP	Shimmy Disc	1988
Bongwater	g	"You Don't Love Me Yet"	7"	Shimmy Disc	1988
Bongwater	g	Too Much Sleep	CD, CS, LP	Shimmy Disc	1989
Bongwater	g	The Power of Pussy	CD, CS, LP	Shimmy Disc	1990
Bongwater	g	Box of Bongwater	4xCD	Shimmy Disc	1990
Dew-Claw	g	Natural Causes	MP3	Geodesic	2010
Galaxie 500	g	"Rain"	7"	Caff Records	1989
Jad Fair & The Shapir-O'Rama	b	We Are the Rage	CD	Avant	1996
Jad Fair & The Shapir-O'Rama	b, g	I Like Your Face	CD	Wire Monkey	1999
King Missile	g	Mystical Shit	CD, CS, LP	Shimmy Disc	1990
King Missile	g	The Way to Salvation	CD, CS, LP	Atlantic Records	1991
King Missile	g	Happy Hour	CD, CS	Atlantic	1992
King Missile	g	"Martin Scorsese"	7"	Staple Gun	1992
King Missile	g, b	King Missile	CD, LP	Atlantic	1994
The Martinets	b	Love! Hate!	CD	Scooch Pooch	2000
The Martinets	b	New Stories for Men	CD, MP3	Scooch Pooch	2002
The Martinets	b	Comeback Tour	CD, MP3	Tornado Ride	2010
Overcat	g	The Great Red Spot	CDR, MP3	Geodesic	2008
Overcat	g, b	For a Better Today, Tomorrrow	MP3	Green Type of Tube	2010
Overcat	g	Overcat/Electro-mud Split	LP	100% Zero Records	2012
Phantom Tollbooth	g, v	"Valley of the Gwangi"	7"	Homestead Records	1986
Phantom Tollbooth	g, v	Phantom Tollbooth	EP	Homestead	1986
Phantom Tollbooth	g, v	One Way Conversation	CS, LP	Homestead	1987
Phantom Tollbooth	g, v	Power Toy	CD, LP	Homestead	1988
Phantom Tollbooth	g, v	Daylight in the Quiet Zone	CD, CS, EP	Homestead	1990
Phantom Tollbooth	g	Beard of Lightning	CD, LP	Off	2003
Phantom Tollbooth	g, v	Power Toy	MP3	PT5speed	2010
Shapir-O'Rama	b	El Mundo de Vapor y Valentia	CD	Mind of a Child	1995
Stress Test	b, g	The Rocket Thing	MP3	Green Type of Tube	2010
When People...	b	Uncle Ben	7"	Shimmy Disc	1988
When People...	b	Bobby	CD, CS, LP	Shimmy Disc	1989
When People...	b	Porgy	CD, CS, LP	Shimmy Disc	1991
When People...	b, g	Bill Kennedy's Showtime	CD, CS, LP	Shimmy Disc	1994
Wide Right	g, b	Wide Right	CD, MP3	Pop Top	2004
Wide Right	g, b	Sleeping On the Couch	CD, MP3	Pop Top	2005
Wonderama	b	"Everyday Should Be My Birthday"	7"	Ajax	1989
Wonderama	b	"Padre Pio: The Stigmatist"	7"	Ajax	1990
Wonderama	b	Chaostrophy	CD, LP	Resonance US	1991
Yo La Tengo	b	"The River of Water"	7"	Egon	1985
Yo La Tengo	g	"For the Turnstiles"	7"	Coyote	1987
Yo La Tengo	b, g	Prisoners of Love	3xCD	Matador Records	2005
