= Vietnam (Shockabilly album) =

Studio album by Shockabilly
- Released: 1984
- Recorded: Noise New York, NYC; Grog Kill Studio, Woodstock, NY
- Genre: Folk; country; lo-fi; psychedelic; sound collage
- Length: 30:15
- Label: Fundamental
- Producer: Kramer

Shockabilly chronology
Colosseum (1984)	Vietnam (1984)	Heaven (1985)

Professional ratings
Review scores
Source	Rating
Allmusic	3/5 stars

Vietnam is the third studio album by American rock band Shockabilly, released in 1984 by Fundamental Records. It released on CD as Vietnam/Heaven in 1990.

== Track listing ==
Side one
No.	Title	Writer(s)	Length
1.	"Pile Up All Architecture"	Eugene Chadbourne, Kramer	2:10
2.	"Born on the Bayou" (Creedence Clearwater Revival cover)	John Fogerty	2:27
3.	"Your U.S.A and My Face"	Eugene Chadbourne	3:21
4.	"Iran into Tulsa"	Eugene Chadbourne, Kramer	2:04
5.	"Vietnam" (John Lee Hooker cover)	John Lee Hooker	3:06
6.	"Flying" (The Beatles cover)	George Harrison, John Lennon, Paul McCartney, Ringo Starr	3:01

Side two
No.	Title	Writer(s)	Length
1.	"Paris"	Kramer	2:09
2.	"Georgia in a Jug" (Johnny Paycheck cover)	Bobby Braddock	2:56
3.	"Lucifer Sam" (Pink Floyd cover)	Syd Barrett	3:19
4.	"Signed D. C." (Love cover)	Arthur Lee	3:14
5.	"Nicaragua"	Kramer, Ed Sanders	2:29

== Personnel ==
Adapted from the Vietnam liner notes.

Shockabilly

- Eugene Chadbourne – vocals, electric guitar
- Kramer – vocals, bass guitar, tape, production
- David Licht – drums

Production and additional personnel

- Juan Maciel – recording
- Michael Macioce – cover art
- Tom Mark – recording
- Ed Sanders – vocals (B5)

== Release history ==
Region	Date	Label	Format	Catalog
United Kingdom	1984	Fundamental	LP	SAVE 1
