= Box of Bongwater =

Box set by Bongwater
- Released: October 20, 1998
- Recorded: 1987–1991
- Studio: Noise New York (New York City, NY)
- Genre: Experimental rock
- Length: 288:27
- Label: Shimmy Disc
- Producer: Kramer

Bongwater chronology
The Peel Session (1992)	Box of Bongwater (1998)

Professional ratings
Review scores
Source	Rating
Allmusic	4.5/5 stars

Box of Bongwater is a career-spanning four-disc box-set of the band Bongwater, released on October 20, 1998 through Shimmy Disc. It contains almost all of the band's recorded output, including four studio albums, an EP, a single, and an edit of a compilation track. The tracks were completely remastered by Alan Douches and Kramer for their inclusion in the set.

== Track listing ==
Disc one
No.	Title	Writer(s)	From the album	Length
1.	"Ride My See-Saw"	John Lodge	Breaking No New Ground!	3:53
2.	"Barely Coping"	Kramer, Ann Magnuson	Breaking No New Ground!	3:11
3.	"4 Sticks"	Jimmy Page, Robert Plant	Breaking No New Ground!	3:13
4.	"U.S.O."	Kramer, Ann Magnuson	Breaking No New Ground!	1:56
5.	"His New Look"	Kramer, Ann Magnuson	Breaking No New Ground!	2:55
6.	"Julia"	Lennon–McCartney	Breaking No New Ground!	3:25
7.	"Lesbians of Russia"	Kramer, David Licht, Ann Magnuson, Dave Rick	Double Bummer	1:30
8.	"Frank"	Kramer, Ann Magnuson	Double Bummer	1:51
9.	"We Did It Again"	Kevin Ayers	Double Bummer	2:16
10.	"Homer"	Kramer	Double Bummer	3:27
11.	"Joy Ride"	Kramer, Ann Magnuson, Dave Rick	Double Bummer	2:57
12.	"Decadent Iranian Country Club"	Kramer, Ann Magnuson, Dave Rick	Double Bummer	2:48
13.	"David Bowie Wants Ideas"	Kramer, Ann Magnuson	Double Bummer	2:13
14.	"Rock & Roll Part 2"	Gary Glitter	Double Bummer	3:19
15.	"Just May Be the One"	Michael Nesmith	Double Bummer	1:52
16.	"There You Go"	Johnny Cash	Double Bummer	2:50
17.	"Shark"	Kramer	Double Bummer	1:23
18.	"Jimmy"	Kramer, Ann Magnuson	Double Bummer	3:58
19.	"Crime"	Kramer	Double Bummer	2:59
20.	"Pornography"	Kramer, Dave Rick	Double Bummer	3:41
21.	"Pew"	Kramer	Double Bummer	3:10
22.	"Dazed & Chinese"	Jimmy Page	Double Bummer	3:46
23.	"Bullaby"	Kramer, Ann Magnuson	Double Bummer	3:10
24.	"So Help Me God"	Kramer, Dave Rick	Double Bummer	4:37

Disc two
No.	Title	Writer(s)	From the album	Length
1.	"His Old Look"	Kramer, Ann Magnuson	Double Bummer	2:58
2.	"Stone"	Coby Batty, Kramer	Double Bummer	2:25
3.	"Number"	Coby Batty, Kramer	Double Bummer	4:43
4.	"Love You To"	George Harrison	Double Bummer	2:15
5.	"Reaganation"	Tuli Kupferberg	Double Bummer	3:04
6.	"Double Birth"	Kramer	Double Bummer	3:18
7.	"Bruce"	Kramer, Ann Magnuson	Double Bummer	2:18
8.	"Pool"	Kramer	Double Bummer	4:40
9.	"Rain"	John Lennon	Double Bummer	5:45
10.	"Havana"	Kramer	Double Bummer (CD version)	3:31
11.	"Pentagon"	Kramer	Double Bummer (CD version)	2:49
12.	"Truth"	Coby Batty, Kramer	Double Bummer (CD version)	1:58
13.	"You Don't Love Me Yet"	Roky Erickson	You Don't Love Me Yet	5:13
14.	"The Porpoise Song"	Gerry Goffin, Carole King	You Don't Love Me Yet	4:49
15.	"The Living End"	Kramer, Ann Magnuson	Too Much Sleep	2:39
16.	"The Drum"	Peter Blegvad, Anthony Moore	Too Much Sleep	4:25
17.	"Mr. and Mrs. Hell"	Kramer, Ann Magnuson	Too Much Sleep	3:24
18.	"Too Much Sleep"	Kramer	Too Much Sleep	3:39
19.	"Talent Is a Vampire"	Kramer, Ann Magnuson, Dave Rick	Too Much Sleep	5:45
20.	"The Bad Review"	Kramer, Ann Magnuson, Dave Rick	Too Much Sleep	1:51
21.	"Ill Fated Lovers Go Time Tripping"	Kramer, Ann Magnuson, Dave Rick	Too Much Sleep	1:52

Disc three
No.	Title	Writer(s)	From the album	Length
1.	"Psychedelic Sewing Room"	Kramer, Ann Magnuson	Too Much Sleep	4:22
2.	"Splash 1"	Roky Erickson, Tommy Hall	Too Much Sleep	2:19
3.	"He Loved the Weather"	Kramer, Ann Magnuson	Too Much Sleep	4:06
4.	"Teena Stays the Same"	Kramer, Ann Magnuson	Too Much Sleep	2:33
5.	"One Hand on the Road"	Kramer, Ann Magnuson	Too Much Sleep	3:16
6.	"Then the Babies Return"	Kramer, Ann Magnuson	Too Much Sleep	3:29
7.	"Why Are We Sleeping?"	Kevin Ayers	Too Much Sleep	3:58
8.	"Khomeini Died Tonight"	Kramer, Ann Magnuson	Too Much Sleep	1:58
9.	"One So Black"	Dogbowl	Too Much Sleep	5:04
10.	"No Trespassing"	Kramer, Ann Magnuson	Too Much Sleep	4:23
11.	"The Power of Pussy"	Kramer, Ann Magnuson	The Power of Pussy	4:00
12.	"Great Radio"	Kramer, Ann Magnuson	The Power of Pussy	4:36
13.	"What If?"	Kramer, Ann Magnuson	The Power of Pussy	2:01
14.	"Kisses Sweeter Than Wine"	The Weavers	The Power of Pussy	3:58
15.	"Chicken Pussy"	Kramer, Ann Magnuson	The Power of Pussy	1:40
16.	"White Rental Car Blues"	Kramer, Ann Magnuson	The Power of Pussy	2:19
17.	"Nick Cave Dolls"	Kramer, Ann Magnuson	The Power of Pussy	4:20
18.	"Bedazzled"	Dudley Moore	The Power of Pussy	2:53
19.	"Obscene and Pornographic Art"	Kramer, Ann Magnuson	The Power of Pussy	3:19
20.	"Connie"	Kramer, Ann Magnuson, Dave Rick	The Power of Pussy	2:37
21.	"What Kind of Man Reads Playboy?"	Robert Fripp, Kramer, Ann Magnuson, Andy Summers	The Power of Pussy	2:23
22.	"I Need a New Tape"	Kramer, Ann Magnuson	The Power of Pussy	1:39
23.	"Women Tied Up in Knots"	Kramer, Ann Magnuson	The Power of Pussy	0:49

Disc four
No.	Title	Writer(s)	From the album	Length
1.	"Junior"	Kramer, Ann Magnuson, Dave Rick	The Power of Pussy	2:16
2.	"Mystery Hole"	Kramer, Ann Magnuson	The Power of Pussy	1:36
3.	"Time Is Coming"	Kramer, Ann Magnuson	The Power of Pussy	2:03
4.	"Folk Song"	Ann Magnuson	The Power of Pussy	9:23
5.	"Ye Olde Backlash"	Kramer, Ann Magnuson	The Big Sell-Out	2:40
6.	"The Real Thing"	Kramer, Ann Magnuson	The Big Sell-Out	3:09
7.	"Free Love Messes Up My Life"	Randolph A. Hudson III, Kramer, Ann Magnuson	The Big Sell-Out	2:17
8.	"You're Like Me Now"	Randolph A. Hudson III, Kramer, Ann Magnuson	The Big Sell-Out	4:31
9.	"I Wanna Talk About It Now"	Kramer	The Big Sell-Out	3:42
10.	"What's Big in England Now?"	Kramer, Ann Magnuson	The Big Sell-Out	1:44
11.	"Schmoozedance"	Kramer, Ann Magnuson	The Big Sell-Out	3:52
12.	"Celebrity Compass"	Randolph A. Hudson III, Kramer, Ann Magnuson	The Big Sell-Out	3:26
13.	"When Johnnie Dies"	Kramer, Ann Magnuson	The Big Sell-Out	3:49
14.	"The Big Sell-Out"	Kramer	The Big Sell-Out	3:50
15.	"Over the Credit Line"	Kramer, Ann Magnuson	The Big Sell-Out	3:09
16.	"Flop Sweats"	Kramer, Ann Magnuson	The Big Sell-Out	4:09
17.	"Holding Hands"	Kramer, Ann Magnuson	The Big Sell-Out	1:39
18.	"Flute of Shame"	Kramer, Ann Magnuson	The Big Sell-Out	1:55
19.	"On the Cusp of 1970"	Kramer, Ann Magnuson	The Big Sell-Out	2:57
20.	"Her Litigious Nature"	Kramer, Ann Magnuson	The Big Sell-Out	2:57
21.	"Love Song"	Ann Magnuson, Kurt Weill	The Big Sell-Out	3:50
22.	"Everybody's Talking"	Ann Magnuson, Fred Neil	The Big Sell-Out	3:16
23.	"Love Life"	Neil Innes	Rutles Highway Revisited	1:34

== Personnel ==
Adapted from the Box of Bongwater liner notes.

Bongwater

- Randolph A. Hudson III – guitar
- Kramer – vocals, instruments, engineering, production
- David Licht – drums, percussion
- Ann Magnuson – vocals
- Dave Rick – guitar

Production and additional personnel

- Dave Bias – art direction
- Alan Douches – remastering
- Laurie Henzel – art direction
- Michael Lavine – photography
- Michael Macioce – photography
- Jim Shaw – art direction

== Release history ==
Region	Date	Label	Format	Catalog
United States	1998	Shimmy Disc	CD	SHM-5555
