= Heaven (Shockabilly album) =

Studio album by Shockabilly
- Released: 1985
- Recorded: Noise New York, NYC
- Genre: Experimental; psychedelic
- Length: 33:47
- Label: Fundamental
- Producer: Kramer

Shockabilly chronology
Vietnam (1984)	Heaven (1985)	The Ghost of Shockabilly (1989)

Professional ratings
Review scores
Source	Rating
Allmusic	3/5 stars

Heaven is the fourth studio album by Shockabilly, released in 1985 by Fundamental Records. It released on CD as Vietnam/Heaven in 1990.

== Track listing ==
Side one
No.	Title	Writer(s)	Length
1.	"Instant Karma" (John Lennon and Yoko Ono cover)	John Lennon	1:50
2.	"She Was a Living Breathing Piece of Dirt"	Eugene Chadbourne	2:17
3.	"Red Headed Stranger" (Arthur "Guitar Boogie" Smith cover)	Edith Lindeman, Carl Stutz	3:00
4.	"When You Dream About Bleeding"	Eugene Chadbourne	2:46
5.	"Tau and the Soldier"	Kramer	2:18
6.	"Life's a Gas" (T. Rex cover)	Marc Bolan	2:50
7.	"Untitled"	Eugene Chadbourne, Kramer

Side two
No.	Title	Writer(s)	Length
1.	"Tray-Panning the Man"	Eugene Chadbourne, Kramer	2:33
2.	"Hendrix Buried in Tacoma"	Eugene Chadbourne	2:22
3.	"How Can You Kill Me, I'm Already Dead"	Eugene Chadbourne	2:26
4.	"Vampire Tiger Girl Strikes Again"	Eugene Chadbourne	1:43
5.	"Pity Me, Sheena"	Kramer	3:05
6.	"Happy New Year"	Eugene Chadbourne	4:20
7.	"Our Metempsychosis"	Kramer	2:27

== Personnel ==
Adapted from the Heaven liner notes.

Shockabilly

- Eugene Chadbourne – vocals, electric guitar
- Kramer – vocals, organ, tape, bass guitar, horn, production, mixing
- David Licht – percussion

Production and additional personnel

- Kevin Fullen – recording
- Michael Macioce – cover art

== Release history ==
Region	Date	Label	Format	Catalog
United Kingdom	1985	Fundamental	LP	SAVE 8
