= Greatest Hits (EP) =

EP by Shockabilly
- Released: 1983
- Recorded: July 1983
- Label: Red Music
- Producer: Kramer

Shockabilly chronology
Earth vs. Shockabilly (1983)	Greatest Hits (1983)	Colosseum (1984)

Professional ratings
Review scores
Source	Rating
Allmusic	4/5 stars

Greatest Hits is an EP by Shockabilly, released in 1983 by Red Music.

== Track listing ==
Side one
No.	Title	Writer(s)	Length
1.	"Bluegrass Breakdown"	Eugene Chadbourne, Kramer, David Licht
2.	"Burma Shave" (Roger Miller cover)	Roger Miller
3.	"Voodoo Vengeance"	Eugene Chadbourne

Side two
No.	Title	Writer(s)	Length
1.	"People Are Strange" (The Doors cover)	Robby Krieger, Jim Morrison
2.	"Wrestling Woman"	Eugene Chadbourne
3.	"Train"	Eugene Chadbourne, Kramer, David Licht

== Personnel ==
Adapted from the Greatest Hits liner notes.

Shockabilly

- Eugene Chadbourne – vocals, electric guitar
- Kramer – organ, tape, production
- David Licht – percussion

Production and additional personnel

- Michael Macioce – cover art
- Scott Piering – recording (A1–A3, B1)

== Release history ==
Region	Date	Label	Format	Catalog
Netherlands	1983	Red Music	LP	EP 006
