= Live: ...Just Beautiful =

Live album by Shockabilly
- Released: 1989
- Recorded: 1983 – 1985
- Length: 69:53
- Label: Shimmy Disc
- Producer: Kramer

Shockabilly chronology
The Ghost of Shockabilly (1989)	Live: ...Just Beautiful (1989)	Vietnam/Heaven (1990)

Professional ratings
Review scores
Source	Rating
Allmusic	4.5/5 stars

Live: ...Just Beautiful is a live performance album by Shockabilly, released in 1989 by Shimmy Disc. It includes live tracks recorded on tour between 1984 and 1985 in Austria, Germany and the United States in addition to remixed tracks taken from The Dawn of Shockabilly.

== Track listing ==
Side one
No.	Title	Writer(s)	Length
1.	"Intro"	Eugene Chadbourne, Kramer, David Licht	1:47
2.	"Georgia in a Jug" (Johnny Paycheck cover)	Bobby Braddock	2:39
3.	"Eight Miles High" (The Byrds cover)	Gene Clark, David Crosby, Jim McGuinn	4:10
4.	"Plunger Routine"	Eugene Chadbourne, Kramer, David Licht	5:32
5.	"Are You Experienced?" (The Jimi Hendrix Experience cover)	Jimi Hendrix	2:15
6.	"Burma Shave" (Roger Miller cover)	Roger Miller	2:13
7.	"Rake/Birdcage Routine"	Eugene Chadbourne, Kramer, David Licht	1:26
8.	"Outro"	Eugene Chadbourne, Kramer, David Licht	1:58

Side two
No.	Title	Writer(s)	Length
1.	"Oh Yoko!" (John Lennon cover)	John Lennon	2:19
2.	"Dang Me" (Roger Miller cover)	Roger Miller	1:52
3.	"Lucifer Sam" (Pink Floyd cover)	Syd Barrett	2:07
4.	"Nobody's Place"	Eugene Chadbourne, Kramer, David Licht	2:52
5.	"Heart Full of Soul" (The Yardbirds cover)	Graham Gouldman	2:41
6.	"Your Good Girl's Gonna Go Bad" (Tammy Wynette cover)	Billy Sherrill, Glenn Sutton	2:39
7.	"Psychotic Reaction" (Count Five cover)	Craig Atkinson, John Byrne, Roy Chaney, Ken Ellner, John Michalski	2:28
8.	"A Hard Day's Night" (The Beatles cover)	Lennon–McCartney	2:16
9.	"Train Kept A-Rollin'" (Tiny Bradshaw cover)	Tiny Bradshaw, Lois Mann	3:16

CD edition bonus tracks
No.	Title	Writer(s)	Length
18.	"Purple Haze" (The Jimi Hendrix Experience cover)	Jimi Hendrix	2:47
19.	"Big Money Broad"	Eugene Chadbourne	2:52
20.	"People Are Strange" (The Doors cover)	Robby Krieger, Jim Morrison	2:45
21.	"I'm the Only Hell (Mama Ever Raised)" (Johnny Paycheck cover)	Johnny Paycheck	2:38
22.	"West Virginia Special"		1:32
23.	"Heartfull of Soul" (The Yardbirds cover)	Graham Gouldman	2:17
24.	"Voodoo Vengeance"	Eugene Chadbourne	2:54
25.	"Homeward Bound" (Simon and Garfunkel cover)	Paul Simon	1:53
26.	"Cops vs. Guardian Angels"	Eugene Chadbourne	2:31
27.	"Train Kept A-Rollin'" (Tiny Bradshaw cover)	Tiny Bradshaw, Lois Mann	3:14

== Personnel ==
Adapted from the Live: ...Just Beautiful liner notes.

Shockabilly

- Eugene Chadbourne – vocals, electric guitar
- Kramer – vocals, organ, tape, bass guitar, production
- David Licht – percussion

Production and additional personnel

- Michael Macioce – cover art

== Release history ==
Region	Date	Label	Format	Catalog
United States	1989	Shimmy Disc	CS, LP	shimmy 027
Netherlands	1989	Shimmy Disc	CD, LP	SDE 8914
