= The Ghost of Shockabilly =

Compilation album by Shockabilly
- Released: 1989
- Length: 72:15
- Label: Shimmy Disc
- Producer: Kramer

Shockabilly chronology
Heaven (1985)	The Ghost of Shockabilly (1989)	Live: ...Just Beautiful (1989)

Professional ratings
Review scores
Source	Rating
Allmusic	2/5 stars

The Ghost of Shockabilly is a compilation album by Shockabilly, released in 1989 by Shimmy Disc. It comprises 1983's Earth vs. Shockabilly and 1984's Colosseum, both originally released by Rough Trade Records.

== Track listing ==
No.	Title	Writer(s)	Length
1.	"Day Tripper" (The Beatles cover)	Lennon–McCartney	3:43
2.	"Are You Experienced?" (The Jimi Hendrix Experience cover)	Jimi Hendrix	3:19
3.	"Burma Shave" (Roger Miller cover)	Roger Miller	1:43
4.	"City of Corruption"	Eugene Chadbourne	3:04
5.	"Bluegrass Breakdown"	Eugene Chadbourne, Kramer, David Licht	0:38
6.	"Party House Pt. III in 3-D"	Eugene Chadbourne	2:39
7.	"People Are Strange" (The Doors cover)	Robby Krieger, Jim Morrison	3:15
8.	"Psychedelic Basement"	Eugene Chadbourne	2:26
9.	"Purple Haze" (The Jimi Hendrix Experience cover)	Jimi Hendrix	2:44
10.	"19th Nervous Breakdown" (The Rolling Stones cover)	Jagger/Richards	3:47
11.	"Tennessee Flat Top Box" (Johnny Cash cover)	Johnny Cash	4:06
12.	"Oh Yoko!" (John Lennon cover)	John Lennon	1:16
13.	"Big Money Broad"	Eugene Chadbourne	3:07
14.	"Wrestling Woman"	Eugene Chadbourne	3:45
15.	"Our Daily Lead"	Eugene Chadbourne, Kramer	1:37
16.	"BYOB Club"	Eugene Chadbourne, Kramer	3:20
17.	"Roman Man"	Eugene Chadbourne	1:40
18.	"Too Big for Its Cage"	Eugene Chadbourne, Kramer	3:35
19.	"Eight Miles High" (The Byrds cover)	Gene Clark, David Crosby, Jim McGuinn	5:58
20.	"Dang Me" (Roger Miller cover)	Roger Miller	2:29
21.	"Secret of the Cooler"	Eugene Chadbourne	3:45
22.	"Hattiesburg, Miss"	Eugene Chadbourne	2:13
23.	"You Dungeon My Brain"	Eugene Chadbourne	3:05
24.	"Homeward Bound" (Simon and Garfunkel cover)	Paul Simon	1:48
25.	"National Bummer"	Eugene Chadbourne	3:14

== Release history ==
Region	Date	Label	Format	Catalog
United States	1989	Shimmy Disc	CD	Shimmy 017+
Netherlands	1989	Shimmy Disc	CD	SDE 8906
