= The Peel Session (Bongwater EP) =

EP by Bongwater
- Released: 1992
- Recorded: March 19, 1991
- Genre: Experimental rock
- Length: 16:45
- Label: Strange Fruit
- Producer: Mike Robinson

Bongwater chronology
| The Big Sell-Out (1992) | The Peel Session (1992) | Box of Bongwater (1998) |

Professional ratings
Review scores
| Source | Rating |
|---|---|
| Allmusic | 3/5 stars |

The Peel Session is an EP by Bongwater, recorded in 1991 from sessions with John Peel but not released until 1992 on Strange Fruit.

== Track listing ==
| No. | Title | Writer(s) | Length |
|---|---|---|---|
| 1. | "You Don't Love Me Yet" | Roky Erickson | 4:05 |
| 2. | "Kisses Sweeter Than Wine" | The Weavers | 5:25 |
| 3. | "The Power of Pussy" | Kramer, Ann Magnuson | 5:05 |
| 4. | "White Car Rental Blues" | Kramer, Ann Magnuson | 2:10 |

== Personnel ==
Adapted from The Peel Session liner notes.

Bongwater

- Randolph A. Hudson III – guitar
- Kramer – vocals, bass guitar
- David Licht – drums
- Ann Magnuson – vocals

Production and additional personnel

- Dogbowl – guitar
- Kevin Gaor – design
- Michael Macioce – photography
- Mike Robinson – production, engineering

== Release history ==
| Region | Date | Label | Format | Catalog |
|---|---|---|---|---|
| United States | 1992 | Strange Fruit | CD | DEI8354 |
