= Double Bummer =

Studio album by Bongwater
- Released: 1988
- Recorded: Noise New York (New York City, NY)
- Genre: Art rock
- Length: 91:50
- Label: Shimmy Disc
- Producer: Kramer

Bongwater chronology
Breaking No New Ground! (1987)	Double Bummer (1988)	Too Much Sleep (1989)

Double Bummer is a double-LP by Bongwater, released in 1988. The four-sided album contained songs about people ranging from Frank Sinatra, David Bowie, Ronald Reagan, and a Cantonese version of Led Zeppelin's "Dazed and Confused". In 1998, the album was remastered by Alan Douches and Kramer for its inclusion in Box of Bongwater set. Music videos for the songs "Lesbians of Russia" and "Jimmy" were directed by Jim Spring and Jens Jurgensen. The album is referenced in the lyrics to the song "Lariat" by Stephen Malkmus and the Jicks.

== Critical reception ==
Professional ratings
Review scores
Source	Rating
AllMusic	4.5/5 stars
Christgau's Record Guide	B

In 2009, Cincinnati CityBeat called the album "an exquisite and spastic evocation of the confused time that spawned it, and a testament to the state of art rock in the late '80s."

== Track listing ==
Side one (First Bummer)
No.	Title	Writer(s)	Length
1.	"Lesbians of Russia"	Kramer, David Licht, Ann Magnuson, Dave Rick	1:31
2.	"Frank"	Kramer, Ann Magnuson	1:51
3.	"We Did It Again" (Soft Machine cover)	Kevin Ayers	2:17
4.	"Homer"	Kramer	3:27
5.	"Joy Ride"	Kramer, Ann Magnuson, Dave Rick	2:57
6.	"Decadent Iranian Country Club"	Kramer, Ann Magnuson, Dave Rick	2:48
7.	"David Bowie Wants Ideas"	Kramer, Ann Magnuson	2:14
8.	"Rock & Roll Part 2" (Gary Glitter cover)	Gary Glitter	3:20

Side two (Second Bummer)
No.	Title	Writer(s)	Length
1.	"Just May Be the One" (The Monkees cover)	Michael Nesmith	1:53
2.	"There You Go" (Johnny Cash cover)	Johnny Cash	2:50
3.	"Shark"	Kramer	1:24
4.	"Jimmy"	Kramer, Ann Magnuson	3:58
5.	"Crime"	Kramer	3:00
6.	"Pornography"	Kramer, Dave Rick	3:42
7.	"Pew"	Kramer	3:11

Side three (Third Bummer)
No.	Title	Writer(s)	Length
1.	"Dazed & Chinese" (Led Zeppelin cover)	Jimmy Page	3:45
2.	"Bullaby"	Kramer, Ann Magnuson	3:12
3.	"So Help Me God"	Kramer, Dave Rick	4:37
4.	"His Old Look"	Kramer, Ann Magnuson	2:58
5.	"Stone"	Coby Batty, Kramer	2:26
6.	"Number"	Coby Batty, Kramer	4:44

Side four (Final Bummer)
No.	Title	Writer(s)	Length
1.	"Love You To" (The Beatles cover)	George Harrison	2:16
2.	"Reaganation"	Tuli Kupferberg	3:05
3.	"Double Birth"	Kramer	3:18
4.	"Bruce"	Kramer, Ann Magnuson	2:18
5.	"Pool"	Kramer	4:40
6.	"Rain" (The Beatles cover)	John Lennon	5:45

== Personnel ==
Adapted from the Double Bummer liner notes.

Bongwater

- Kramer – vocals, instruments, production, engineering
- David Licht – drums
- Ann Magnuson – vocals, instruments
- Dave Rick – guitar

Production and additional personnel

- Don Cherry – trumpet
- Michael Macioce – photography
- Gary Windo – tenor saxophone

== Release history ==
Region	Date	Label	Format	Catalog
United States	1988	Shimmy Disc	CD, CS, LP	shimmy 011
Netherlands	1990	Shimmy Disc	LP	SDE 8801
