= Too Much Sleep =

Studio album by Bongwater
- Released: 1989
- Recorded: Noise New York (New York City, NY)
- Genre: Experimental rock
- Length: 48:02
- Label: Shimmy Disc
- Producer: Kramer

Bongwater chronology
Double Bummer (1988)	Too Much Sleep (1989)	The Power of Pussy (1990)

Professional ratings
Review scores
Source	Rating
Allmusic	3/5 stars

Too Much Sleep is the second album by the experimental college rock/art rock band Bongwater. It was released in 1989. In 1998, the album was remastered by Alan Douches and Kramer for its inclusion in Box of Bongwater set.

Most of the songs are written by Mark Kramer and Ann Magnuson with some exceptions. "Talent Is a Vampire," "The Bad Review," and "Ill Fated Lovers Go Time Tripping" were written by Kramer, Magnuson, and Dave Rick. The title track was written strictly by Kramer, while "One So Black" was written by former King Missile member Dogbowl. Notable cover tunes include "The Drum" written by Peter Blegvad and Anthony Moore, "Why Are We Sleeping?" by Kevin Ayers, and "Splash 1" by the 13th Floor Elevators, one of two Roky Erickson covers with which Bongwater made themselves famous.

Bongwater's usual drummer David Licht did not appear on the album, which used a drum machine.

Music videos were created for the songs "The Drum", "Why Are We Sleeping" and "Psychedelic Sewing Room", all directed by Brad Dunning.

== Track listing ==
Side one
No.	Title	Writer(s)	Length
1.	"The Living End"	Kramer, Ann Magnuson	2:40
2.	"The Drum" (Slapp Happy cover)	Peter Blegvad, Anthony Moore	4:25
3.	"Mr. and Mrs. Hell"	Kramer, Ann Magnuson	3:24
4.	"Too Much Sleep"	Kramer	3:39
5.	"Talent Is a Vampire"	Kramer, Ann Magnuson, Dave Rick	5:45
6.	"Psychedelic Sewing Room"	Kramer, Ann Magnuson	4:22

Side two
No.	Title	Writer(s)	Length
1.	"Splash 1" (The 13th Floor Elevators cover)	Roky Erickson, Tommy Hall	2:19
2.	"He Loved the Weather"	Kramer, Ann Magnuson	4:07
3.	"Teena Stays the Same"	Kramer, Ann Magnuson	2:33
4.	"One Hand on the Road"	Kramer, Ann Magnuson	3:15
5.	"Khomeini Died Tonight"	Kramer, Ann Magnuson	1:58
6.	"One So Black"	Dogbowl	5:04
7.	"No Trespassing"	Kramer, Ann Magnuson	4:23

CD edition bonus tracks
No.	Title	Writer(s)	Length
1.	"The Living End"	Kramer, Ann Magnuson	2:40
2.	"The Drum" (Slapp Happy cover)	Peter Blegvad, Anthony Moore	4:25
3.	"Mr. and Mrs. Hell"	Kramer, Ann Magnuson	3:24
4.	"Too Much Sleep"	Kramer	3:39
5.	"Talent Is a Vampire"	Kramer, Ann Magnuson, Dave Rick	5:45
6.	"The Bad Review"	Kramer, Ann Magnuson, Dave Rick	1:50
7.	"Ill Fated Lovers Go Time Tripping"	Kramer, Ann Magnuson, Dave Rick	1:52
8.	"Psychedelic Sewing Room"	Kramer, Ann Magnuson	4:22
9.	"Splash 1" (The 13th Floor Elevators cover)	Roky Erickson, Tommy Hall	2:19
10.	"He Loved the Weather"	Kramer, Ann Magnuson	4:07
11.	"Teena Stays the Same"	Kramer, Ann Magnuson	2:33
12.	"One Hand on the Road"	Kramer, Ann Magnuson	3:15
13.	"Then the Babies Return"	Kramer, Ann Magnuson	3:29
14.	"Why Are We Sleeping?" (Soft Machine cover)	Kevin Ayers	3:58
15.	"Khomeini Died Tonight"	Kramer, Ann Magnuson	1:58
16.	"One So Black"	Dogbowl	5:04
17.	"No Trespassing"	Kramer, Ann Magnuson	4:23

== Personnel ==
Adapted from the Too Much Sleep liner notes.

Bongwater

- Kramer – vocals, instruments, engineering, production
- Ann Magnuson – vocals
- Dave Rick – guitar

Production and additional personnel

- Coby Batty – French horn
- Michael Macioce – photography
- Jim Shaw – art direction

== Release history ==
Region	Date	Label	Format	Catalog
United States	1989	Shimmy Disc	CD, CS, LP	shimmy 031
Netherlands	1990	Shimmy Disc	CD, LP	SDE 9017

== Legacy ==
Electric Six covered "The Living End". Their version was released as B-side on the single Gay Bar.
