= Breaking No New Ground! =

EP by Bongwater
- Released: 1987
- Recorded: Noise New York (New York City, NY)
- Genre: Experimental rock
- Length: 18:37
- Label: Shimmy Disc
- Producer: Kramer

Bongwater chronology
Breaking No New Ground! (1987)	Double Bummer (1988)

Professional ratings
Review scores
Source	Rating
Allmusic	3/5 stars

Breaking No New Ground! is the debut EP by Bongwater, released in 1987 through Shimmy Disc. In 1998, the album was remastered by Alan Douches and Kramer for their inclusion in Box of Bongwater set.

== Track listing ==
Side one
No.	Title	Writer(s)	Length
1.	"Ride My See-Saw" (The Moody Blues cover)	John Lodge	3:53
2.	"Barely Coping"	Kramer, Ann Magnuson	3:11
3.	"4 Sticks" (Led Zeppelin cover)	Jimmy Page, Robert Plant	3:13

Side two
No.	Title	Writer(s)	Length
1.	"U.S.O."	Kramer, Ann Magnuson	1:56
2.	"His New Look"	Kramer, Ann Magnuson	2:55
3.	"Julia" (The Beatles cover)	Lennon–McCartney	3:26

== Personnel ==
Adapted from the Breaking No New Ground! liner notes.

Bongwater

- Kramer – vocals, instruments, engineering, production
- David Licht – instruments
- Ann Magnuson – vocals, instruments

Production and additional personnel

- Axle Stone Lead – instruments
- Samm Bennett – instruments
- Chris Cochrane – instruments
- Fred Frith – instruments
- Davey Williams – instruments

== Release history ==
Region	Date	Label	Format	Catalog
United States	1987	Shimmy Disc	LP	shimmy 002
Netherlands	1987	Shadowline	LP	SR6887
