= Colosseum (album) =

Studio album by Shockabilly
- Released: 1984
- Recorded: Noise New York, NYC
- Genre: Folk-rock; psychedelia; lo-fi
- Length: 32:44
- Label: Rough Trade
- Producer: Kramer

Shockabilly chronology
Greatest Hits (1983)	Colosseum (1984)	Vietnam (1984)

Professional ratings
Review scores
Source	Rating
Allmusic	2/5 stars

Colosseum is the second studio album by Shockabilly, released in 1984 by Rough Trade Records. It released on CD as The Ghost of Shockabilly in 1989.

== Track listing ==
Side one
No.	Title	Writer(s)	Length
1.	"Our Daily Lead"	Eugene Chadbourne, Kramer	1:37
2.	"BYOB Club"	Eugene Chadbourne, Kramer	3:20
3.	"Roman Man"	Eugene Chadbourne	1:40
4.	"Too Big for Its Cage"	Eugene Chadbourne, Kramer	3:35
5.	"Eight Miles High" (The Byrds cover)	Gene Clark, David Crosby, Jim McGuinn	5:58

Side two
No.	Title	Writer(s)	Length
1.	"Dang Me" (Roger Miller cover)	Roger Miller	2:29
2.	"Secret of the Cooler"	Eugene Chadbourne	3:45
3.	"Hattiesburg, Miss"	Eugene Chadbourne	2:13
4.	"You Dungeon My Brain"	Kramer	3:05
5.	"Homeward Bound" (Simon and Garfunkel cover)	Paul Simon	1:48
6.	"National Bummer"	Eugene Chadbourne	3:14

== Personnel ==
Adapted from the Colosseum liner notes.

Shockabilly

- Eugene Chadbourne – vocals, electric guitar
- Kramer – vocals, organ, tape, production, engineering
- David Licht – percussion

Production and additional personnel

- Juan Maciel – recording

== Release history ==
Region	Date	Label	Format	Catalog
United Kingdom	1984	Rough Trade	LP	ROUGH 68
