= Earth vs. Shockabilly =

Studio album by Shockabilly
- Released: 1983
- Recorded: October 31, 1982
- Genre: Rock
- Length: 34:32
- Label: Rough Trade; Shimmy Disc (re-issue)
- Producer: Kramer

Shockabilly chronology
The Dawn of Shockabilly (1982)	Earth vs. Shockabilly (1983)	Greatest Hits (1983)

Professional ratings
Review scores
Source	Rating
Allmusic	3/5 stars

Earth vs. Shockabilly is the debut studio album of Shockabilly, released in 1983 by Rough Trade Records. It was re-issued in 1988 on Shimmy Disc with four additional tracks and again in 1989 on CD as The Ghost of Shockabilly.

== Track listing ==
Side one
No.	Title	Writer(s)	Length
1.	"19th Nervous Breakdown" (The Rolling Stones cover)	Jagger/Richards	3:47
2.	"Are You Experienced?" (The Jimi Hendrix Experience cover)	Jimi Hendrix	3:19
3.	"Psychedelic Basement"	Eugene Chadbourne	2:26
4.	"Big Money Broad"	Eugene Chadbourne	3:07
5.	"Tennessee Flat Top Box" (Johnny Cash cover)	Johnny Cash	4:06
6.	"City of Corruption"	Eugene Chadbourne	3:04

Side two
No.	Title	Writer(s)	Length
1.	"People Are Strange" (The Doors cover)	Robby Krieger, Jim Morrison	3:15
2.	"Day Tripper" (The Beatles cover)	Lennon–McCartney	3:43
3.	"Purple Haze" (The Jimi Hendrix Experience cover)	Jimi Hendrix	2:44
4.	"Wrestling Woman"	Eugene Chadbourne	3:45
5.	"Oh Yoko!" (John Lennon cover)	John Lennon	1:16

== Personnel ==
Adapted from the Earth vs. Shockabilly liner notes.

Shockabilly

- Eugene Chadbourne – vocals, electric guitar
- Kramer – vocals, organ, tape, production, engineering
- David Licht – percussion

Production and additional personnel

- Sheena Dupuis – design
- Michael Macioce – cover art
- George Peckham – mastering
- Geoff Travis – executive producer

== Charts ==
Chart (1983)	Peak position
UK Indie Chart	17

== Release history ==
Region	Date	Label	Format	Catalog
United Kingdom	1983	Rough Trade	LP	ROUGH 48
France	1984	Celluloid	LP	CEL 6645
United States	1988	Shimmy Disc	CS, LP	Shimmy 017
