= The Big Sell-Out =

Studio album by Bongwater
- Released: March 1992
- Recorded: Summer 1991
- Studio: Noise New York (New York City, NY)
- Genre: Alternative rock; art rock; experimental rock
- Length: 56:52
- Label: Shimmy Disc
- Producer: Kramer

Bongwater chronology
The Power of Pussy (1990)	The Big Sell-Out (1992)	The Peel Session (1992)

Professional ratings
Review scores
Source	Rating
Allmusic	4.5/5 stars

The Big Sell-Out is the fourth studio album by the experimental college rock/art-rock band Bongwater. It was recorded in 1991 and released in 1992. In 1998, the album was remastered by Alan Douches and Kramer for its inclusion in Box of Bongwater set.

The album is widely considered to be a representation of the growing rift between Magnuson and Kramer. The cover boasts of containing the singles "Celebrity Compass", "Schmoozedance", and "Free Love Messes Up My Life". "Celebrity Compass" was originally introduced during a performance of "You Don't Love Me Yet" by Roky Erickson on an episode of the variety show Night Music, which also featured Screamin' Jay Hawkins.

Maintaining their tradition of neo-psychedelia, "Ye Olde Backlash" contains a melody somewhat reminiscent of "For Your Love" by The Yardbirds. The band's habit of name-dropping also continues as Magnuson mentions a casual meeting with Lenny Kravitz in the song "What's Big in England Now?"

The title track ends with a sound file of the self-promotional audio tape by "J&H Productions", the talent agency of an unknown man living in Cincinnati, Ohio sent to the entertainment industry, claiming to represent "star after star after star". "Holding Hands" is actually a gruesome tale of young lovers trying to escape Nazi-occupation of some undetermined Eastern European country. The album ends with a cover of the Fred Neil song "Everybody's Talkin'" where Ann narrates, assisting one of her relatives in suicide prevention.

== Track listing ==
No.	Title	Writer(s)	Length
1.	"Ye Olde Backlash"	Kramer, Ann Magnuson	2:41
2.	"The Real Thing"	Kramer, Ann Magnuson	3:09
3.	"Free Love Messes Up My Life"	Randolph A. Hudson III, Kramer, Ann Magnuson	2:17
4.	"You're Like Me Now"	Randolph A. Hudson III, Kramer, Ann Magnuson	4:31
5.	"I Wanna Talk About It Now"	Kramer	3:42
6.	"What's Big in England Now?"	Kramer, Ann Magnuson	1:44
7.	"Schmoozedance"	Kramer, Ann Magnuson	3:53
8.	"Celebrity Compass"	Randolph A. Hudson III, Kramer, Ann Magnuson	3:26
9.	"When Johnnie Dies"	Kramer, Ann Magnuson	3:49
10.	"The Big Sell-Out"	Kramer	3:49
11.	"Over the Credit Line"	Kramer, Ann Magnuson	3:09
12.	"Flop Sweats"	Kramer, Ann Magnuson	4:08
13.	"Holding Hands"	Kramer, Ann Magnuson	1:40
14.	"Flute of Shame"	Kramer, Ann Magnuson	1:54
15.	"On the Cusp of 1970"	Kramer, Ann Magnuson	2:57
16.	"Her Litigious Nature"	Kramer, Ann Magnuson	2:57
17.	"Love Song"	Ann Magnuson, Kurt Weill	3:50
18.	"Everybody's Talking"	Ann Magnuson, Fred Neil	3:16

== Personnel ==
Adapted from the liner notes of The Power of Pussy.

Bongwater

- Randolph A. Hudson III – guitar
- Kramer – vocals, instruments, engineering, production
- David Licht – drums, percussion
- Ann Magnuson – vocals

Production and additional personnel

- Laurie Henzel – art direction
- Michael Lavine – photography
- Ron Paul – assistant engineer

== Release history ==
Region	Date	Label	Format	Catalog
United States	1992	Shimmy Disc	CD, LP	shimmy 050
Netherlands	1992	Shimmy Disc	CD, LP	SDE 9239
