= The Power of Pussy =

Studio album by Bongwater
- Released: 1990
- Recorded: Noise New York (New York City, NY)
- Genre: Experimental rock
- Length: 51:52
- Label: Shimmy Disc
- Producer: Kramer

Bongwater chronology
Too Much Sleep (1989)	The Power of Pussy (1990)	The Big Sell-Out (1992)

Professional ratings
Review scores
Source	Rating
Allmusic	3/5 stars
Mojo	3/5 stars
Uncut	4/5 stars

The Power of Pussy is the third studio album by Bongwater, released in 1990 by Shimmy Disc. The album contains major college radio hits such as the title track, as well as favorites such as "Nick Cave Dolls" and "Folk Song," with covers of Dudley Moore's "Bedazzled" and "Kisses Sweeter Than Wine" by The Weavers. In 1998, it was remastered by Alan Douches and Kramer for its inclusion in Box of Bongwater set.

== Track listing ==
Side one
No.	Title	Writer(s)	Length
1.	"The Power of Pussy"	Kramer, Ann Magnuson	4:00
2.	"Great Radio"	Kramer, Ann Magnuson	4:36
3.	"What If?"	Kramer, Ann Magnuson	2:01
4.	"Kisses Sweeter Than Wine" (The Weavers cover)	The Weavers	3:58
5.	"Chicken Pussy"	Kramer, Ann Magnuson	1:40
6.	"White Rental Car Blues"	Kramer, Ann Magnuson	2:19
7.	"Nick Cave Dolls"	Kramer, Ann Magnuson	4:20
8.	"Bedazzled" (Dudley Moore cover)	Dudley Moore	2:53

Side two
No.	Title	Writer(s)	Length
1.	"Obscene and Pornographic Art"	Kramer, Ann Magnuson	3:19
2.	"Connie"	Kramer, Ann Magnuson, Dave Rick	2:37
3.	"What Kind of Man Reads Playboy?"	Kramer, Ann Magnuson	2:23
4.	"I Need a New Tape"	Kramer, Ann Magnuson	1:39
5.	"Women Tied Up in Knots"	Kramer, Ann Magnuson	0:49
6.	"Junior"	Kramer, Ann Magnuson, Dave Rick	2:16
7.	"Mystery Hole"	Kramer, Ann Magnuson	1:37
8.	"Time Is Coming"	Kramer, Ann Magnuson	2:03
9.	"Folk Song" (contains a sample from Roundabout by Yes)	Ann Magnuson	9:22

== Personnel ==
Adapted from The Power of Pussy liner notes.

Bongwater

- Kramer – vocals, instruments, engineering, production
- David Licht – drums, percussion
- Ann Magnuson – vocals
- Dave Rick – guitar

Production and additional personnel

- Tseng Kwong Chi – photography
- Sheena Dupuis – design
- Michael Macioce – photography
- Ron Paul – assistant engineer
- Fred Schneider – vocals (A1)
- Peter Stampfel – banjo (A4)

== Release history ==
Region	Date	Label	Format	Catalog
United States	1990	Shimmy Disc	CD, CS, LP	shimmy 040
Netherlands	1991	Shimmy Disc	CD	SDE 9134
