= The Dawn of Shockabilly =

EP by Shockabilly
- Released: 1982
- Genre: Rockabilly; surf; psychedelic rock; avant-garde; noise rock; country; blues
- Length: 13:18
- Label: Rough Trade
- Producer: Kramer

Shockabilly chronology
The Dawn of Shockabilly (1982)	Earth vs. Shockabilly (1983)

Professional ratings
Review scores
Source	Rating
Allmusic	3/5 stars

The Dawn of Shockabilly is an EP by Shockabilly, released in 1982 by Rough Trade Records.

== Track listing ==
Side one
No.	Title	Writer(s)	Length
1.	"Psychotic Reaction" (Count Five cover)	Craig Atkinson, John Byrne, Roy Chaney, Ken Ellner, John Michalski	2:41
2.	"Heart Full of Soul" (The Yardbirds cover)	Graham Gouldman	2:39
3.	"Train Kept A-Rollin'" (Tiny Bradshaw cover)	Tiny Bradshaw, Lois Mann	2:27

Side two
No.	Title	Writer(s)	Length
1.	"A Hard Day's Night" (The Beatles cover)	Lennon–McCartney	2:16
2.	"Your Good Girl's Gonna Go Bad" (Tammy Wynette cover)	Billy Sherrill, Glenn Sutton	3:13

== Personnel ==
Adapted from The Dawn of Shockabilly liner notes.

Shockabilly

- Eugene Chadbourne – vocals, electric guitar
- Kramer – organ, tape, production
- David Licht – percussion

Production and additional personnel

- John Jordan – recording
- Michael Macioce – cover art
- George Peckham – mastering
- Shannon Scully – cover art

== Release history ==
Region	Date	Label	Format	Catalog
United Kingdom	1982	Rough Trade	LP	RT 120T
