= Manhattan Tango =

Live album by Joe McPhee and Jérôme Bourdellon
- Released: 2004
- Recorded: April 4, 2000 at Ariane Lopez-Huici & Alain Kirili's loft in Manhattan's Tribeca
- Genre: Jazz
- Length: 54:46
- Label: Label Usine 1008
- Producer: Craig Johnson

Joe McPhee chronology
Grand Marquis (1999)	Manhattan Tango (2004)	Port of Saints (2000)

Manhattan Tango is a live album by multi-instrumentalist Joe McPhee and flautist Jérôme Bourdellon recorded in New York in 2000 and first released on the French Label Usine.

== Reception ==
Professional ratings
Review scores
Source	Rating
Allmusic	4/5 stars
All About Jazz	3/5 stars
All About Jazz	4.5/5 stars

Allmusic reviewer Eugene Chadbourne states "For McPhee and Bourdellon's combination of instruments, however, the sound of the room is simply fantastic, creating a richness that would simply not be possible using any kind of reverb-recording equipment available, analog, digital or magical". On All About Jazz John Kelman states "Manhattan Tango is clearly not for the less adventurous listener. Still, with an almost telepathic connection that results in some startling coalescence of sound, rhythm and texture, it makes a strong case that free music can be more than just a cacophony of sound, that it can be the meeting point for daring and an investigation into interaction that, in some respects, is all the more compelling for its lack of traditional framework" while Rex Butters said "Manhattan Tango captures the intimacy of two friends playing in two friends' living room, materializing fire".

== Track listing ==
All compositions by Joe McPhee and Jérôme Bourdellon

1. "Business Hour" - 4:49
2. "Pearls for Swine" - 6:40
3. "White Street, 17A" - 5:24
4. "A.K.A.L.H." - 9:25
5. "In the Noiseless Loft" - 4:14
6. "Come Back Ella" - 3:26
7. "Mystery "J"" - 8:56
8. "Manhattan Tango" - 10:52

== Personnel ==
- Joe McPhee - pocket trumpet, voice
- Jérôme Bourdellon - flute, bass flute, piccolo flute
