= Camper Van Chadbourne =

Studio album by Eugene Chadbourne with Camper Van Beethoven
- Released: 1987
- Genre: Rock
- Label: Fundamental

Eugene Chadbourne chronology
Corpses of Foreign War (1986)	Camper Van Chadbourne (1987)	LSD C&W – The History of the Chadbournes in America (1987)

Camper Van Beethoven chronology
Vampire Can Mating Oven (1987)	Camper Van Chadbourne (1987)	Our Beloved Revolutionary Sweetheart (1988)

Camper Van Chadbourne is an album by the American musician Eugene Chadbourne and the American band Camper Van Beethoven, released in 1987. The musicians supported the album with North American live dates. Virgin Records, which had just signed Camper Van Beethoven, was unhappy with the album title. Camper Van Chadbourne was a success on North American and European college radio stations. It sold around 20,000 copies in its first year of release.

A live album, Revenge of Camper Van Chadbourne, recorded by Chadbourne and Camper Van Beethoven members Jonathan Segel and Victor Krummenacher, was released in 1999, as was the collection Used Record Pile.

== Production ==
The album's original songs were written by Chadbourne. "Reason to Believe" is a cover of the Tim Hardin song. "Games People Play" is a version of the Joe South song. "Careful with That Axe, Eugene" was originally written and recorded by Pink Floyd. The album cover art is by Chadbourne's daughter.

== Critical reception ==
Professional ratings
Review scores
Source	Rating
AllMusic	4/5 stars
Alternative Rock	5/10
Chicago Tribune	2/4 stars
The Encyclopedia of Popular Music	3/5 stars
MusicHound Rock: The Essential Album Guide	3.5/5 stars
Spin Alternative Record Guide	6/10

The Chicago Tribune labeled the album "screechy, crazed rock 'n' roll; mellow but demented guitar-noodling instrumentals; weird folk- and jazz-based material; and strange country ballads that are endearing in their not-quite-right way." The New York Times said that "Camper Van Beethoven backs the verbal witticisms with self-consciously mundane music, while Mr. Chadbourne is a musical anarchist who can match Mr. Van Beethoven joke for joke." The Daily Post called the album a "masterpiece" that encompasses "country and folknik styles as well as rock". The Boston Globe advised: "Envision Arlo Guthrie making punk records and you've got the idea."

Trouser Press opined that Chadbourne "almost comes off as a father-figure on the joint Camper Van Chadbourne, although he easily out-eccentrics the Santa Cruz eclecticians." AllMusic noted, "While Chadbourne still flies off on meandering guitar tangents and noise excursions, the instrumental talents of CVB provide a better anchor so that the individual tracks don't degenerate into chaos." The Spin Alternative Record Guide said that Chadbourne "brought out the best elements of [CVB's] (sometimes scattershot) eclecticism".

== Track listing ==
No.	Title	Length
1.	"Reason to Believe"
2.	"I Talk to the Wind"
3.	"Fayettenam"
4.	"Evil Filthy Preacher"
5.	"Games People Play"
6.	"Zappa Medley"
7.	"Ba-lue Bolivar Ba-Iues Are"
8.	"Boy with the Coins"
9.	"Ballad of Easy Rider"
10.	"Psychadelic Basement"
11.	"Hum-Allah Hum-Allah"
12.	"Careful with That Axe, Eugene"
13.	"Ba-Iue Bolivar (Slight Return)"
14.	"They Can Make It Rain Bombs"
