= Emancipation Proclamation: A Real Statement of Freedom =

Live album by Hamid Drake and Joe McPhee
- Released: 2000
- Recorded: June 25, 1999 at the Empty Bottle in Chicago.
- Genre: Jazz
- Length: 58:44
- Label: Okka Disk OD12036
- Producer: Bruno Johnson, Hamid Drake and Joe McPhee

Joe McPhee chronology
No Greater Love (1999)	Emancipation Proclamation: A Real Statement of Freedom (2000)	Grand Marquis (1999)

Emancipation Proclamation: A Real Statement of Freedom is an album by percussionist Hamid Drake and multi-instrumentalist and composer Joe McPhee recorded in 1999 and first released on the Okka Disk label.

== Reception ==
Professional ratings
Review scores
Source	Rating
Allmusic	4/5 stars
All About Jazz	4/5 stars
The Penguin Guide to Jazz Recordings	4/4 stars

Allmusic reviewer Thom Jurek states "Emancipation Proclamation: A Real Statement of Freedom is one of those avant jazz duet dates that puts everything else in perspective by revealing at its heart that anything is possible when conditions are right". On All About Jazz, Derek Taylor wrote "Taped at Chicago's Empty Bottle where monumental meetings of this caliber almost seem customary it's a union that many followers of creative improvised music have been dreaming about for some time".

== Track listing ==
All compositions by Joe McPhee and Hamid Drake except as indicated

1. "Cries and Whispers" - 18:37
2. "Mother Africa (For Miriam Makeba)" - 17:10
3. "God Bless the Child" (Billie Holiday, Arthur Herzog Jr.) - 4:17
4. "Emancipation Proclamation" - 14:30
5. "Hate Crime Cries" - 3:13

== Personnel ==
- Joe McPhee - pocket trumpet, tenor saxophone
- Hamid Drake - percussion, drums
