= Dee O'Hara =

First aerospace nurse to NASA's first astronauts

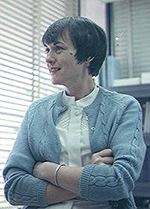
- Dee O'Hara
- Born: August 9, 1935 (age 90); Nampa, Idaho, U.S.
- Known for: First Nurse to NASA's First Astronauts

Dolores B. "Dee" O'Hara (born August 9, 1935, in Nampa, Idaho) is a retired nurse who was the first aerospace nurse to NASA's first astronauts, laying the foundation to the field of Space nursing. O'Hara was the official nurse to the Mercury Seven astronauts and their families, continuing to support the Gemini Program, Apollo astronauts and Skylab.

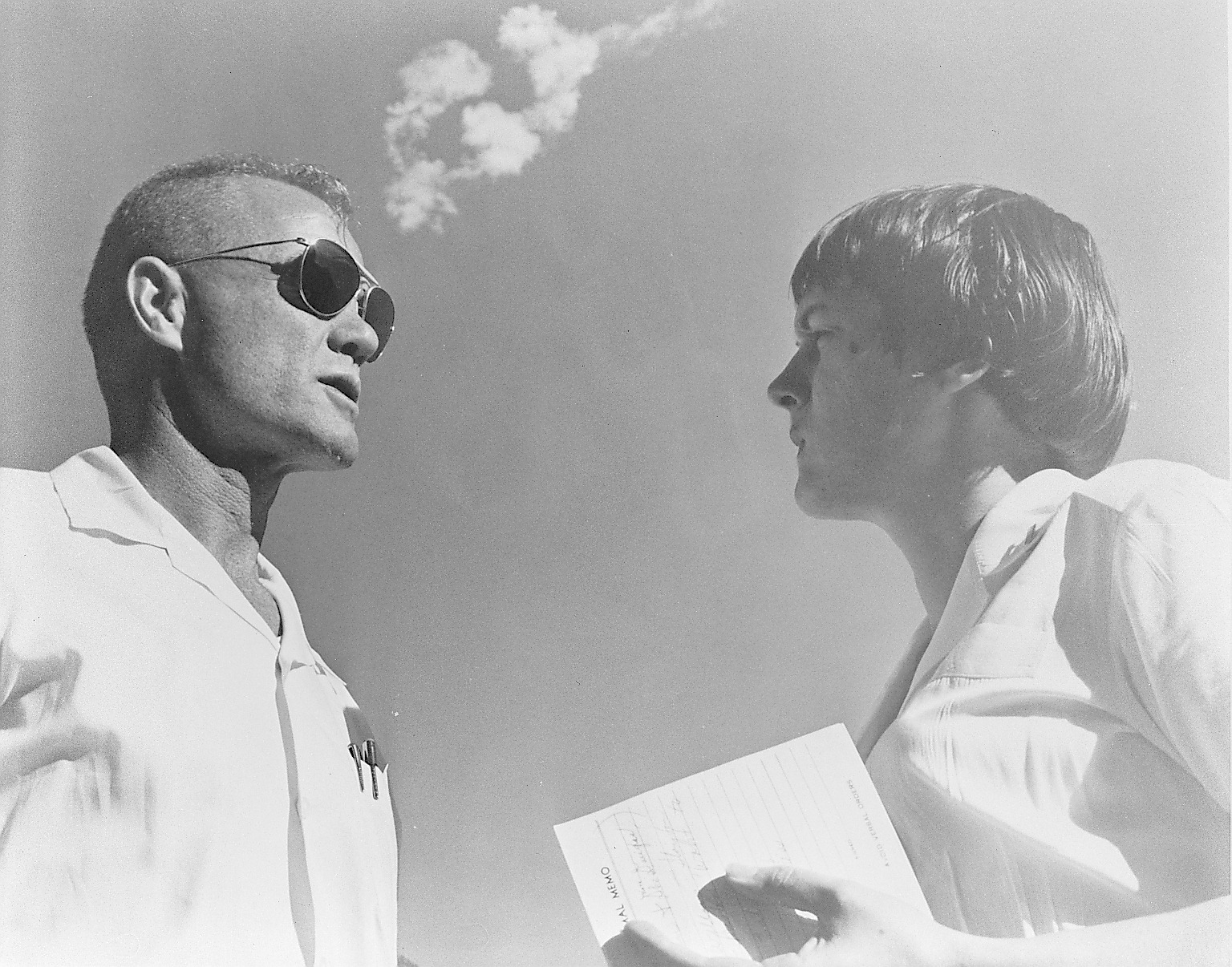
Astronaut John Glenn, pilot of the Mercury-Atlas 6 space mission, confers with Astronaut Nurse Dolores B. O'Hara, R.N., during MA-6 pre-launch preparations.

== Early life ==
O'Hara was born on August 9, 1935, in Nampa, Idaho. In 1956 graduated from the Providence Hospital School of Nursing in Portland, Oregon. After graduation, between 1956 - 1957 O'Hara completed coursework in Operating Room Technique in the University of Oregon. She worked as a surgical nurse at the University of Oregon Medical School. Because of back problems, she moved on to work with three diagnosticians in Portland, Oregon, and learned how to do lab work and X-rays.

== U.S. Air Force ==
Convinced by her roommate, she decided to join the Air Force, which was not common for women to do at the time. O'Hara completed officers' training at Maxwell Air Force Base Alabama at the rank of second lieutenant.

In May 1959, O'Hara was assigned to Patrick Air Force Base in Cape Canaveral, Florida, in support of the Mercury Program. In 1963 she was officially assigned as the Office Nurse in Cocoa Beach, Florida.

O'Hara resigned from the US Air Force in 1964, in order to move to the Manned Spacecraft Center (later the Johnson Space Center) to set up the Medicine Flight Clinic.

== Space nurse ==
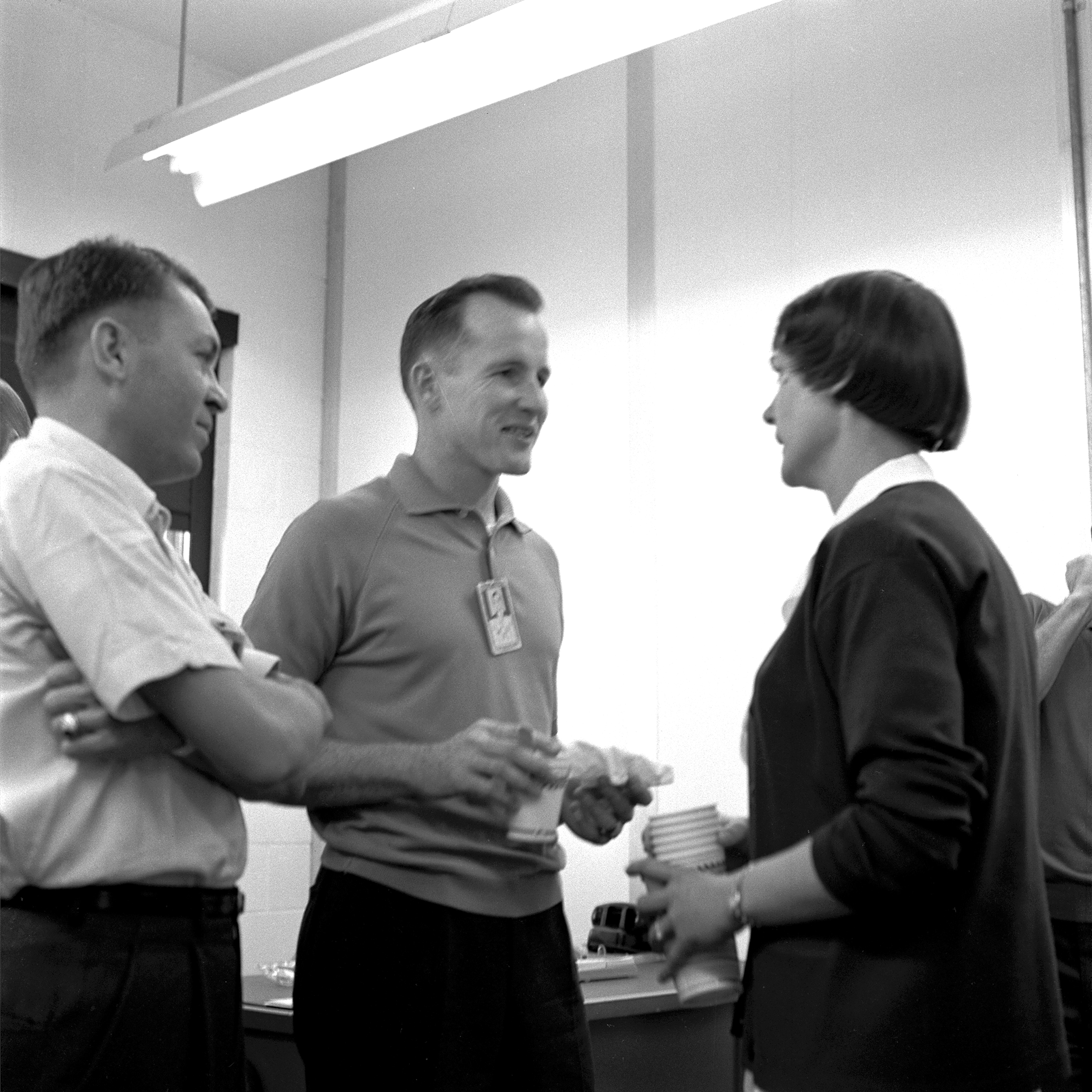
Nurse Dee O'Hara talking to astronaut Ed White and Elliot See in Aero Med, Hangar, 1962

In November 1959, O'Hara became the first Staff Nurse of the Mercury Program. Her job was to set up the Aeromed Lab, the crew sleeping quarters, the exam area for the astronauts in Hangar S, and be with them as their nurse. Colonel George Knauf, Center Commander of Patrick Air Force Base wanted to have a nurse in the Mercury program team because he thought the astronauts would be more likely to share information with the staff nurse than with the flight surgeon who could ground them. Also, the nurse would be around enough to identify when they are not feeling well.

O'Hara gained the confidence of the astronauts. She had made a deal with the astronauts that they would not hide information from her, and she would not betray their confidence, unless, she thought it may jeopardize them or the mission. She was the only nurse assigned to the astronauts. O'Hara became close to the astronauts and their families. Before every launch she performed the pre-flight physicals including height, weight, temperatures, blood pressure measurements. The astronauts would not agree to let anyone else but O'Hara draw blood before launch.

O'Hara also helped set up the portable hospital at the Grand Bahama Island to support post flight examination and, if needed, treat injured astronauts after landing (especially in the sub orbital flights). Additional Nurse, Lieutenant Shirley Sineath was assigned as a surgical nurse on the recovery team.

In 1964, she moved to Houston to set up the Flight Medicine Clinic at the Manned Spacecraft Center in Houston. She was the Occupational Health Nurse until 1967, and the manager of the Preventive Medicine Office between 1967 and 1971.

During the Gemini Program she worked with the astronauts and the families, while she was the only nurse along the five flight surgeons. O'Hara performed all the pre-flight checks, fly down to Cape Canaveral and stayed there until the crew was recovered and brought back to the Cape, to do the post-flight exams. In Houston she performed all the routine check ups and more detailed exams, along with all of the administrative tasks, and taking care of the astronaut families. In addition to taking care of the astronaut families, the clinic also took care of the NASA aircraft operations pilots and all the crew personnel. O'Hara supported the Apollo Program astronauts, through tragedies like the Apollo 1 fire and accomplishments such as the Moon landings.

Between 1971 and 1974 O'Hara was the manager of the Medical Operations Division in the Flight Medicine Branch until moving to Ames Research Center. She was involved in the decision to ground astronaut Ken Mattingly from Apollo 13 due to the concern he might have contracted German measles.

O'Hara participated in every launch in the Mercury, Gemini and Apollo programs. After Skylab, she was also invited to participate in the Apollo-Soyuz Test Program (ASTP) and the first shuttle flight in 1981. During her time as the Astronaut's Nurse, she received a large amount of fan mail.

== Ames Research Center ==
In 1974, O'Hara moved to the Ames Research Center where she managed the Human Research Facility until her retirement in 1997. Among her projects, she was in charge of bed rest studies which discovered physiological parallels between bed rest and spaceflight conditions, findings that were foundational for ground-based studies of astronaut orbital health.

After her retirement O'Hara continued to volunteer at the Ames Human Research Center. She is also an outside member of the Human Research Institutional Review Board.

== Portrayals ==
In the 1998 miniseries From the Earth to the Moon, O'Hara was portrayed by Ann Magnuson.

In the 2020 television series The Right Stuff, she was portrayed by Kaley Ronayne.
