= Space nursing =

One of the nursing specialties

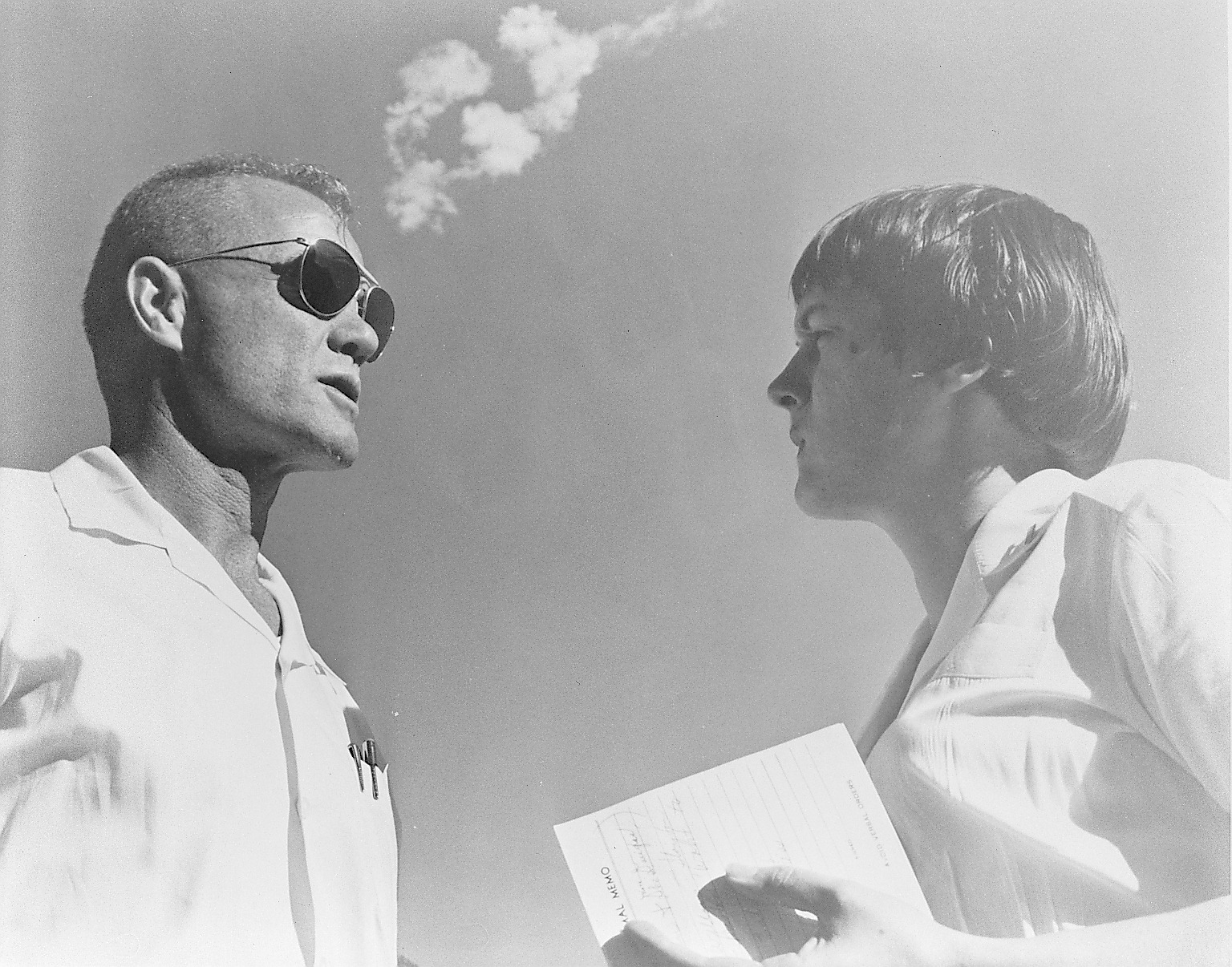
Astronaut John H. Glenn Jr., pilot of the Mercury-Atlas 6 earth-orbital space mission, confers with Astronaut Nurse Dolores O'Hara during prelaunch preparations.

Space nursing is a specialty that works with astronauts to determine medical fitness for their missions, equips NASA team members to handle emergencies in orbit and researches the effects of space travel on the human body. The career got its start during the space race of the 1960s and has grown—both in terms of number of people in the field and knowledge base—ever since. Research conducted by medical professionals in the aeronautics field has led to many breakthroughs in disease treatment of earthbound patients and the discipline continually develops new technology to make space medicine more effective.

== History ==
Since the beginning of commercial aviation in the 1920s, nurses have been part of aviation and flight. In 1958, President Eisenhower signed the National Aeronautics and Space Act to form NASA. Part of this act was to recruit nurses to work closely with medical teams to determine the health of astronauts prior to launch. Following their return, nurses assisted with performing medical assessments to determine the effects of space travel on the mission team.

=== First space nurses ===
Lt Dolores "Dee" O'Hara (born 1935) and Lt Shirley Sineath were the first nurses assigned to work with the seven Project Mercury astronauts. Lieutenant O'Hara was the official staff nurse while Lieutenant Sineath was assigned as a surgical nurse on the recovery team.[5] Before her career with NASA, O’Hara worked as a registered nurse in the labor and delivery ward of Patrick Air Force Base in Cape Canaveral, FL. In 1959, she was called into the office of Colonel Knauf (the commander of the hospital). Knauf offered her a job as a nurse for Project Mercury and she accepted. Part of the reason O'Hara was selected for the team was so that she could gain the trust of the astronauts. NASA figured if the astronauts trusted their nurses, they would inform them when they were feeling ill—something they wouldn't tell their flight surgeons for fear that their flight would be grounded. In an interview conducted in 2002, O’Hara described her job as being to "go aboard recovery ships…be available [to] set up little hospitals aboard ships, should there be a problem upon landing" and to "put together these medical kits and everything that people on board the ships would need to treat an injured astronaut." Additionally, it was O'Hara's responsibility to perform the pre-flight physicals, which included height, weight, temperatures and blood pressure measurements.[3] Following her career as a nurse to astronauts, O'Hara transferred to a role as manager of the Human Research Facility at Ames Research center in 1974, where she worked until her retirement in 1997.

== Present day space nursing ==
=== Career path and necessary qualifications ===
In 1962 NASA announced the Space Nursing Program, which required applicants to have a previous bachelor's degree in nursing, a requirement that has remained to the present day. There are 2 main categories of career paths to working in aerospace medicine at NASA. The military route involves enlistment in either the US Air Force—which offers a residency program for aerospace medicine at Wright-Patterson Air Force Base in Ohio—or US Navy (which offers a similar program at The Naval Aerospace Medical Institute in Pensacola, Florida). The civilian path entails courses at a university or institution, followed by a month-long clerkship at NASA, which they offer to medical students in their fourth year. Wright State University, the University of Texas Medical Branch at Galveston and Mayo Clinic are currently the only entities in the US with aerospace medicine programs.

=== Medical complications surrounding space travel ===
==== Problems emerging during or upon return from space flight ====
- Lightheadedness
- Deterioration of proprioception (ability to sense the movement and location of ones body)
- Slower wound healing
- Immune system suppression
- Muscle atrophy
- Reduction in bone density
- Facial swelling
- Height increase
- Low blood pressure
- Fainting
- Blurred vision
- Poor nutrition: weight loss, dehydration
- Disruption to sleep patterns
- Fatigue
- Poor coordination
- Possible decreased fertility

==== Complications that can develop years later ====
- Cancer due to radiation
- Hyperthyroidism
- Cataracts

== Future ==
=== Technology ===
There are many new devices and techniques, either in the process of research and development or already in use, to improve space medicine. A few examples are:

- Remote/telepresence surgery- a surgeon on earth controls robotic instruments that are physically performing the surgery in space
- Computer-Assisted Design and Computer Assisted Manipulation (CAD-CAM)- medical supplies assembled by technology using specification data contained on board or communicated from Earth
- Telemedicine- high quality pictures of injuries or symptoms experienced in orbit sent to a doctor on Earth who is then able to diagnose and recommend treatment without being physically present
- Devices that make medicine- the shelf life of many pharmaceuticals are not long enough to remain viable for long-term missions. Researchers are considering technology that manufactures drugs from stored substrates as they are needed by astronauts.

==== Implications on earthly medicine ====
In 2018, Dr. Serena Auñón-Chancellor completed a six-month space expedition to collect samples of her body fluids to be analyzed on earth. Her research has led to new knowledge and possible treatment breakthroughs for osteoporosis, Parkinson's, cancer and fertility.

== See also ==
- Space Nursing Society
- Space medicine
