= Space Nursing Society =

International space advocacy organization

- Formation: 1991
- Type: Professional organization
- Purpose: Scientific
- Headquarters: Palmdale, California, United States

The Space Nursing Society is an international space advocacy organization devoted to space nursing and space exploration by registered nurses. The society is an affiliated, non-profit special interest group associated with the National Space Society.

The society was founded in 1991 and has members from around the world including Australia, Canada, Czech Republic, England, Germany, Greece, Scotland and the United States.

The society serves as a forum for the discussion and study of issues related to nursing in space and the impact of these studies on nursing on Earth. Linda Plush, a nurse practitioner, is a co-founder.

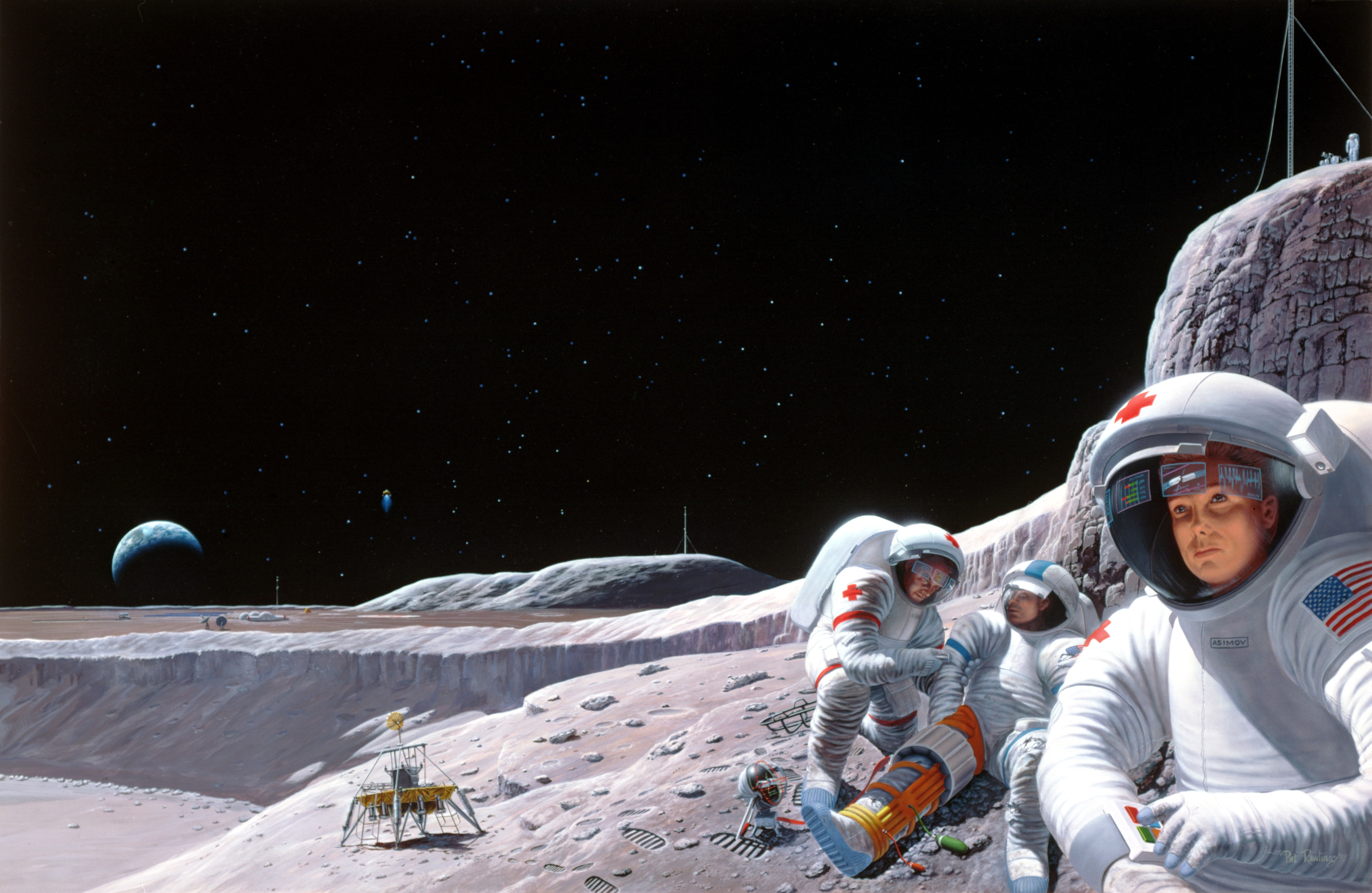
A NASA illustration of a medical emergency at a lunar colony

== See also ==
- Space colonization
- Vision for Space Exploration
