= Bongwater (band) =

American rock band

- Origin: New York City
- Genres: Experimental rock; art rock; psychedelic rock
- Years active: 1987–1992
- Label: Shimmy Disc
- Past members: Ann Magnuson; Mark Kramer; David Licht; Dave Rick; Randolph A. Hudson III aka Randy Hudson.

Bongwater was an American psychedelic rock band, which formed in 1987 and dissolved in 1992. The group was founded by Ann Magnuson and Mark Kramer (who was also the founder of the Shimmy Disc record label), who had worked together previously in Pulsallama. The group also featured drummer David Licht and guitarists Dave Rick and later Randolph A. Hudson III. Guests included Fred Frith, Peter Stampfel and Fred Schneider.

== Overview ==
Earlier recordings consisted of psychedelic-era cover songs, sound collages and originals in an abrasive and/or abstract, dense and sludgy experimental style with often dreamy and cacophonous vocals by Magnuson on the songs "Frank" (a sardonic "tribute" to Frank Sinatra) and "Dazed and Chinese" (Led Zeppelin's "Dazed and Confused", sung in Cantonese). The band's style ultimately evolved into a more poppy, sexy approach which still retained an experimental edge as well as retaining the surreal and wicked, often self-deprecating wit which had distinguished the group's earlier releases. Lengthy sound collages would often terminate or begin the songs and without warning, a spoken word monologue (often taken from Magnuson's dream journal excerpts) might cut into the music.

They distinguished themselves as interpreters of songs by other artists and in particular of 1960s psychedelic rock songs, although they also covered occasional oddities like "Bedazzled" by Dudley Moore. They made "Kisses Sweeter Than Wine" by The Weavers, "The Drum" by Slapp Happy and "You Don't Love Me Yet" by Roky Erickson into virtual signature tunes. The former was made into a tribute to Bobby, Magnuson's late brother, and others lost to AIDS. A number of their other songs made reference to this. This included their arguably biggest college radio hit "Folk Song".

The group created a number of arty low budget home movie-style music videos, three directed by Magnuson's then-boyfriend, Brad Dunning. However a more slick and polished example, "The Power of Pussy", strangely, aired on the Playboy Channel, which also financed its production.

Bongwater had two major college radio hits, "The Power of Pussy" and the nine-minute "Folk Song", and some college radio chart success. Personality clashes and money issues caused the duo to split up with much acrimony.

== Select discography ==
all on Shimmy Disc unless stated

Studio Albums

- Double Bummer (1988)
- Too Much Sleep (1989)
- The Power of Pussy (1990)
- The Big Sell-Out (1992)

Extended Plays

- Breaking No New Ground! (1987)
- The Peel Session (1992; Dutch East India Trading Records)

Singles

- "You Don't Love Me Yet" b/w "The Porpoise Song" (7" Vinyl) (1988)

Compilations

- Double Bummer/Breaking No New Ground
- Box of Bongwater (1998)
