= John Bertram (architect) =

American architect

John Bertram (born July 28, 1966) is an American architect. He is best known for restoring homes designed by midcentury modernist architect Richard Neutra. Bertram graduated from the Yale School of Architecture in 1994, where he was the recipient of the American Institute of Architects Henry Adams Certificate for Excellence in the Scholarly Pursuit of Architecture, the AIA's Scholarship for Academic Excellence, and the Gertraud A. Wood Traveling Fellowship. After working in Chicago and Arizona, Bertram moved to Los Angeles in 1997, where he joined Marmol Radziner + Associates as Project Architect/Project Manager on the restoration and remodeling of Richard Neutra's 1955 Brown House. He founded Bertram Architects in 1999. Bertram married actress/writer Ann Magnuson in 2002.
