= Grand Marquis (album) =

Studio album by Joe McPhee and Johnny McLellan
- Released: 2000
- Recorded: August 23, 1999 at Persona Sound Studio in Framingham, Massachusetts.
- Genre: Jazz
- Length: 59:57
- Label: Boxholder BHX004

Joe McPhee chronology
Emancipation Proclamation: A Real Statement of Freedom (1999)	Grand Marquis (2000)	Manhattan Tango (2000)

Grand Marquis is an album by multi-instrumentalist Joe McPhee and drummer Johnny McLellan recorded in 1999 and first released on the Boxholder label.

== Reception ==
Professional ratings
Review scores
Source	Rating
Allmusic	4/5 stars
The Penguin Guide to Jazz Recordings	3/4 stars

Allmusic reviewer Thom Jurek states "this duet between tenor saxophone improvisation giant Joe McPhee and vanguard drummer Johnny McClellan is a testament to the liberating nature of free jazz at its best. Here are two men who, on their respective instruments, experience their musical phrasing in entirely different ways, yet complement each other so wonderfully that it's hard to believe they never played together before this day. ...Anyway you slice it, anyway you hear it, it comes out as honest, emotionally compelling, intellectually stimulating, and musically strident free jazz. Awesome". On All About Jazz writer Derek Taylor said "This is creative improvised collaboration of the highest caliber- the kind of music that offers an escape route from the stressful and consuming concerns of everyday life if you open yourself to its embrace. As another indispensable addition to McPhee’s ever enlarging body of work it also gives notice that the Marquis has no intention of abdicating his reign any time soon". in JazzTimes Bill Shoemaker stated "McPhee is a fully matured artist who knows he has his audience's full attention from the outset. He certainly has McLellan listening; the drummer's ability to give even fragmentary statements a sure forward movement is an essential ingredient of the music. And just about everything Joe McPhee says on Grand Marquis is spellbinding".

== Track listing ==
All compositions by Johnny McLellan except as indicated

1. "Never the More" - 6:32
2. "Glommed" - 6:23
3. "Durt Kolphy" - 5:55
4. "The Legendary" - 5:11
5. "Never the Less" - 8:03
6. "ABL" - 6:49
7. "Grand Marquis" - 5:28
8. "Que Phenomena" - 11:37
9. "Odo's Return to the Link" (Johnny McLellan, Joe McPhee) - 3:59

== Personnel ==
- Joe McPhee - tenor saxophone
- Johnny McLellan - drums
