= The Luv Show =

Studio album by Ann Magnuson
- Released: November 1995
- Length: 51:45
- Label: Geffen
- Producer: Don Fleming

The Luv Show is an album by the American musician Ann Magnuson. It was released in 1995 on Geffen Records. Magnuson later developed a stage production based on the album.

== Critical reception ==
Professional ratings
Review scores
Source	Rating
AllMusic	3/5 stars
Calgary Herald	3.5/5 stars
Robert Christgau	(dud)

The Hamilton Spectator called the album "a hoot from start to finish, a hilariously horny musical about a small-town girl who gets the education of her life when she arrives in Hollywood." The New York Times deemed it "a quirky, 50's-styled concept album." The Calgary Herald wrote that "Magnuson plays the raving bimbo one moment and the poetic Jungian the next, crafting a hilarious song cycle that sways from lounge, surf punk and artsy East-side New York dope-rock without losing your attention."

== Track listing ==
1. "Dead Moth"
2. "This Nothing Life"
3. "Waterbeds of Hollywood"
4. "It's a Great Feeling (Tease)"
5. "Sex With the Devil"
6. "It's a Great Feeling"
7. "Miss Pussy Pants"
8. "Live, You Vixen!"
9. "Some Kind of a Swinger"
10. "L.A. Donut Day"
11. "M.K.C.F."
12. "Swinger (Reprise)"
13. "Man With No Face"
14. "I Remember You"

== Album credits ==
Songstress: Ann Magnuson
Producer: Don Fleming
Engineer: Adam Kaspar

In Los Angeles
Supersession band:
Guitar – Art Byington
Bass – Richie Lee
Drums, Percussion, Effects – Mike Kelley
L.A. Studio: Chéz Kelley
L.A. Remote: Your Place Or Mine
Assistant Engineer: Tom Nellen

In New York City
Keyboards and Accordion – Tom Judson
Guitars – Randolph A. Hudson III, Dave Rick, Dom Fleming, Ann Magnuson
Percussion – David Licht
Trombone – Christoper Washburne
Trumpet – John Walsh
Theremin – Walter Sear, Don Fleming
NYC Studio: Sear Sound
Engineer: Bil Emmons
Mastering: Greg Calbi at Masterdisk, NY, NY
Vibeology: Jim Dunbar

with special guest star Jim Thirlwell as "That Satan Guy"
