= Pretty Songs & Ugly Stories =

Studio album by Ann Magnuson
- Released: December 2006
- Label: Asphodel
- Producer: Kristian Hoffman

Pretty Songs & Ugly Stories is the second solo album by Ann Magnuson which was originally released in December 2006 on Asphodel Records. It was produced, co-written, and arranged by Ann's longtime collaborator and musical director, Kristian Hoffman. Some of the musical guests include Rufus Wainwright, David Weiss on musical saw, D. J. Bonebrake, and the Chapin Sisters.

== Track listing ==
1. "Falling For An Actor"
2. "Art Professor"
3. "Disassociation"
4. "I Met An Astronaut"
5. "Sky's a-Cryin'"
6. "The Picture on My Dentist's Wall"
7. "Hey There Little Miss Pussy Pants"
8. "Full of Fuck"
9. "Just A Guy"
10. "Whatever Happened to New York?"
11. "Old Enuf 2 B Yer Mom"
12. "Is This Heaven?"
13. "Cynical Girl"
14. "What is Pretty?"
