= Kisses Sweeter than Wine =

1951 song performed by the Weavers

"Kisses Sweeter Than Wine"
- 1951 45 rpm release by the Weavers, 9-27670

Single by the Weavers
- A-side: "When the Saints Go Marching In"
- Written: 1950
- Published: 1951
- Released: July 1951
- Recorded: June 12, 1951
- Genre: Folk; pop
- Label: Decca
- Composer: Traditional Irish (credited to "Joel Newman")
- Lyricists: Pete Seeger, Lee Hays (under pseudonym "Paul Campbell")

1951 sheet music, Folkways, New York.

"Kisses Sweeter Than Wine" is a popular song, with lyrics written and music adapted in 1950 by Pete Seeger and Lee Hays of the Weavers. It became a US hit in a version recorded by the Weavers in 1951, and an even bigger hit in 1957 when recorded by Jimmie Rodgers. Frankie Vaughan also had a top ten hit with the song in the UK in 1958.

The tune was adapted from Lead Belly's "If It Wasn't for Dicky" (1937), which in turn was adapted from the traditional Irish folk tune "Drimindown / Drumion Dubh". The Weavers first released the song in 1951 as a Decca single, which reached number 19 on the Billboard chart and number 20 on the Cashbox chart in 1951. Rodgers hit number 7 on the Billboard charts with the song in 1957, and Frankie Vaughan hit number 8 in the UK with it the following year.

== History ==
=== Irish folk song – "An droimfhionn donn dilís" / "Drimindown" ===
The song is based on a version of the traditional Irish song "An droimfhionn donn dilís" (Irish for "The whitebacked brown faithful cow/calf") about a farmer and his dead cow. It is of the type categorized as "aisling" (dream) where the country of Ireland is given form. Most times the form is that of a comely young woman but here it is the faithful handsome cow.

A retired Irish farmer named Tim Galvin was recorded in 1982 singing a version called "Droimeann Donn" which uses a very similar refrain melody to the one adapted by Leadbelly. Traditional recordings of the original Irish song, Anglicised as "Drimindown" or "Drimmin Doo", also survived in the oral tradition in North America, from Prince Edward Island in Canada, to the Ozark region of the United States.

=== Lead Belly – "If It Wasn't for Dicky" ===
In his 1993 book Where Have All the Flowers Gone, Pete Seeger described the long genesis of this song. The American folk and blues singer Lead Belly heard Irishman Sam Kennedy singing "Drimmin Down" in Greenwich Village. Lead Belly adapted the song into "If It Wasn't for Dicky", which retained the tune he heard and the farmer/cow theme. Lead Belly did not like the lack of rhythm, a common feature of Irish songs, so he made the piece more rhythmic, playing the chorus with a 12-string guitar. "If It Wasn't for Dicky" was first recorded by Lead Belly in 1937.

=== The Weavers – "Kisses Sweeter than Wine" ===
Seeger liked Lead Belly's version of the song. In 1950, the quartet the Weavers, to which Seeger belonged, had made a hit version of Lead Belly's "Goodnight, Irene", and they were looking for new material. Seeger and Lee Hays wrote new lyrics (Hays wrote all new verses, Seeger re-wrote Lead Belly's chorus), turning "If It Wasn't for Dicky" into a love song. "Kisses Sweeter Than Wine" was published in 1951 and recorded by the Weavers on June 12, 1951, in New York City for Decca Records (catalog number 27670), reaching number 19 on the US Billboard chart.

The music was credited to Joel Newman and the lyrics to Paul Campbell, both names being pseudonyms for Howie Richmond, the Weavers' publisher. The Weavers' music publisher was Folkways Publishing, one of the many subsidiaries (aliases) of TRO/The Richmond Organisation, founded by Howard Richmond. Others are Ludlow Music, Folkways Music, Essex, Hollis, Hampstead House, Worldwide Music, Melody Trails, and Cromwell.

In his 1993 book, Seeger wrote: "Now, who should one credit on this song? The Irish, certainly. Sam Kennedy, who taught it to us. Lead Belly, for adding rhythm and blues chords. Me, for two new words for the refrain. Lee, who wrote seven verses. Fred and Ronnie, for paring them down to five. I know the song publisher, The Richmond Organization, cares. I guess folks whom TRO allows to reprint the song, (like Sing Out!, the publisher of this book) care about this too."

== Chart performance ==
The Weavers' original 1951 single release spent six weeks on the Billboard chart, peaking at number 19, and reached number 20 on the Cashbox chart.

== Other recordings ==
- The song was also a hit for Jimmie Rodgers in 1957. Rodgers's version went to number 7 in the US, and was a gold record. In Canada it reached number 6.
- In 1958, a recording by Frankie Vaughan reached number 8 on the UK Singles Chart.
- In their Peel session version of the song, Bongwater's lead singer, Ann Magnuson, dedicated the song to friends who had died of AIDS. The band's cover also appeared on their album The Power of Pussy.
