= Vampire Can Mating Oven =

EP by Camper Van Beethoven
- Released: 1987
- Genre: Alternative rock
- Length: 21:48
- Label: Pitch-A-Tent
- Producer: Camper Van Beethoven, Wally Sound, Harry Parker

Camper Van Beethoven chronology
Camper Van Beethoven (1986)	Vampire Can Mating Oven (1987)	Our Beloved Revolutionary Sweetheart (1988)

Professional ratings
Review scores
Source	Rating
AllMusic	3/5 stars
Robert Christgau	A−
The Encyclopedia of Popular Music	3/5 stars
MusicHound Rock: The Essential Album Guide	2/5 stars
New Musical Express	2/10
The New Rolling Stone Album Guide	3/5 stars
Spin Alternative Record Guide	5/10

Vampire Can Mating Oven is an EP of rarities and unreleased songs by the alternative rock band Camper Van Beethoven, released in 1987 in the US on their own Pitch-A-Tent Records label.

The EP includes satirical liner notes relating false stories behind the songs. "Photograph" and "Never Go Back" were taken from a BBC Radio One session recorded in March 1987 for the Janice Long show. A re-recorded version of "Never Go Back" was included the following year on the band's major label debut, Our Beloved Revolutionary Sweetheart.

The UK edition on Rough Trade Records featured an extra track on Side 1 - "Good Guys & Bad Guys" from their self-titled 1986 album Camper Van Beethoven.

== Critical reception ==
Billboard called the EP "typically funny and provocative." Trouser Press deemed it "enjoyable odds and ends," and praised the "jolly" cover of "Photograph".

== US Track listing ==
1. "Heart" – 3:08
2. "Never Go Back" – 3:24
3. "Seven Languages" – 4:11
4. "Ice Cream Everyday" – 4:03
5. "Processional" – 3:48
6. "Photograph" – 3:14

== UK Track listing ==
1. "Good Guys & Bad Guys" - 3:55
2. "Heart" – 3:08
3. "Never Go Back" – 3:24
4. "Seven Languages" – 4:11
5. "Ice Cream Everyday" – 4:03
6. "Processional" – 3:48
7. "Photograph" – 3:14

== Charts ==
Chart (1987)	Peak position
UK Indie Chart	24
