= Vietnam/Heaven =

Compilation album by Shockabilly
- Released: January 1990
- Genre: Experimental; noise rock
- Label: Shimmy Disc
- Producer: Kramer

Shockabilly chronology
Live: ...Just Beautiful (1989)	Vietnam/Heaven (1990)

Professional ratings
Review scores
Source	Rating
AllMusic	4.5/5 stars

Vietnam/Heaven is a compilation album by the band Shockabilly. The album is a combination of two previously unavailable LPs, and was well received by critics. These recordings feature many sonic techniques that were later emulated by bands such as Primus and Sonic Youth.

== Track listing ==
=== Vietnam ===
1. "Pile Up All Architecture" (Chadbourne, Kramer)
2. "Born on the Bayou" (John Fogerty)
3. "Your U.S.A. and My Face" (Chadbourne)
4. "(I Don't Wanna Go To) Vietnam" (John Lee Hooker)
5. "Flying" (George Harrison, John Lennon, Paul McCartney, Ringo Starr)
6. "Nicaragua" (Kramer, Ed Sanders)
7. "Paris" (Kramer)
8. "Iran Into Tulsa" (Chadbourne, Kramer)
9. "Georgia In a Jug" (Bobby Braddock)
10. "Lucifer Sam" (Syd Barrett)
11. "Signed D.C." (Arthur Lee)

=== Heaven ===
1. "Instant Karma!" (John Lennon)
2. "She Was a Living, Breathing Piece of Dirt" (Chadbourne)
3. "Red Headed Stranger" (Edith Lindeman Calisch, Carl Stutz)
4. "When You Dream About Bleeding" (Chadbourne)
5. "Tau & The Soldier" (Kramer)
6. "Life's a Gas" (Marc Bolan)
7. "Tray-Panning the Man" (Kramer)
8. "Hendrix Buried in Tacoma" (Chadbourne)
9. "How Can You Kill Me, I'm Already Dead" (Chadbourne)
10. "Vampire Tiger Girl Strikes Again" (Chadbourne)
11. "Pity Me, Sheena" (Kramer)
12. "Happy New Year" (Chadbourne)
13. "Our Metempsychosis" (Kramer)

== Release history ==
Region	Date	Label	Format	Catalog
Netherlands	1990	Shimmy Disc	CD	SDE 9026
United States	1990	Shimmy Disc	CS	S 026 cs
United States	2001	Shimmy Disc	CD	SHM5026
