= Shockabilly =

American avant-rock band

- Origin: New York City, U.S.
- Genres: Avant-rock
- Years active: 1982–1985
- Labels: Shimmy Disc; Rough Trade; Red; Fundamental
- Past members: Eugene Chadbourne; Kramer; David Licht

Shockabilly was an American avant-rock band from New York City. Shockabilly released four studio albums between 1982 and 1985, displaying an experimental approach to music that encompassed influence from numerous genres. The band's line-up included Eugene Chadbourne on guitar and vocals, Mark Kramer on bass guitar and organ, and David Licht on drums.

== Style and influences ==
Although the name of the group suggested that Shockabilly were a rockabilly band, only one release by the group, The Dawn of Shockabilly, contained any rockabilly influence. Shockabilly was actually an avant-rock band, although the band's experimental approach to music saw their works encompassing many genres, including blues, country, folk, folk-rock, lo-fi, noise rock, psychedelic, rockabilly, rock and roll and surf, all of which would be explored in avant-garde arrangements, as the band performed covers of songs by other artists that were nearly unrecognizable from the original compositions. The band's music has been seen as a possible influence on the later works of future experimental rock bands such as Sonic Youth, and Primus, where the vocals of Les Claypool have been compared to the vocal style used by Eugene Chadbourne in Shockabilly.

== Discography ==
- The Dawn of Shockabilly (Rough Trade, 1982)
- Earth vs. Shockabilly (Rough Trade, 1983)
- Colosseum (Rough Trade, 1984)
- Vietnam (Fundamental Music, 1984)
- Heaven (Fundamental Music, 1985)
- Live: ...Just Beautiful (Shimmy Disc, 1990)
