= Eugene Chadbourne =

American banjoist, guitarist and music critic (born 1954)

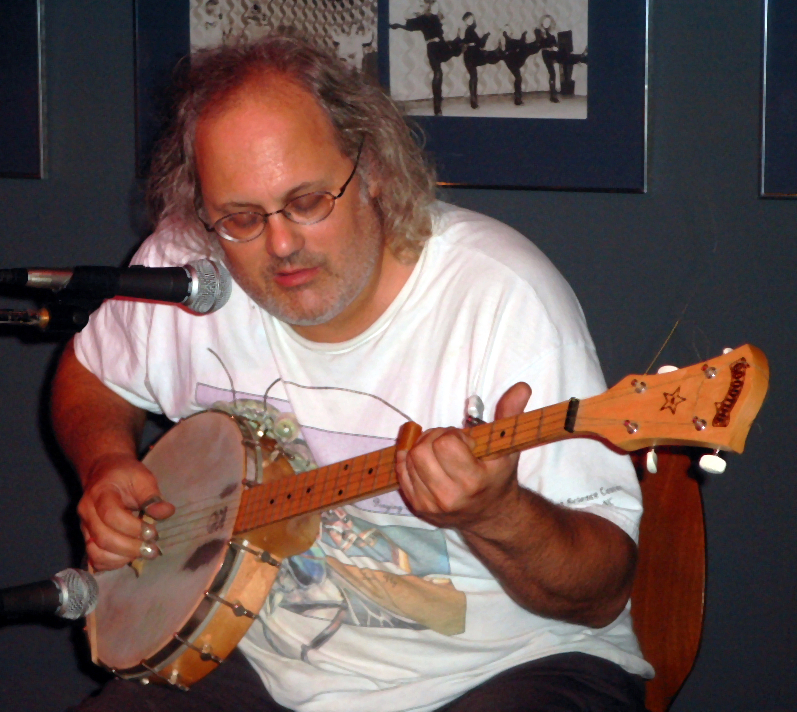
- Chadbourne performing in 2003

Background information
- Born: January 4, 1954 (age 72); Mount Vernon, New York, U.S.
- Genres: Avant-rock; avant-garde jazz; free jazz
- Occupations: Musician and music critic
- Instruments: Banjo, guitar
- Years active: 1976–present
- Website: eugenechadbourne.com

Eugene Chadbourne (born January 4, 1954) is an American banjoist, guitarist and music critic.

== Life and career ==
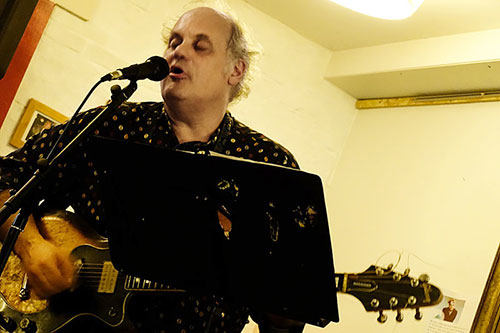
Chadbourne in Aarhus, Denmark, 2015

Chadbourne was born in Mount Vernon, New York, but grew up in Boulder, Colorado. He started playing guitar when he was 11 or 12 years old, inspired by the Beatles and hoping to get the attention of girls. Although he was drawn to Jimi Hendrix and played in a garage band, he found rock and pop music too conventional. He gravitated to the avant-garde jazz of Anthony Braxton and Derek Bailey. Braxton persuaded Chadbourne to abandon his intention to enter journalism and instead pursue music.

During the early 1970s, he lived in Canada to avoid military service in the Vietnam War. Returning to the United States, he moved to New York City in the mid-1970s and played free improvisation with Henry Kaiser and John Zorn. Around this time, he released his first album, Solo Acoustic Guitar. In the early 1980s, he led the avant-rock band Shockabilly with Mark Kramer and David Licht.

Chadbourne explored other genres, playing with a Cajun band and a Russian folk band at a festival in Winnipeg. He mixed country, Western, and improvisation in the band LSD C&W. For many years he was in a duo with Jimmy Carl Black, who played drums for Frank Zappa. He has also worked with Han Bennink, Fred Frith, Elliott Sharp, and Charles Tyler.

A solo album, Songs (Intakt, 1993), featured politically oriented originals, such as "Hello Ceausescu", and covers, such as Nick Drake's "Thoughts of Mary Jane", Phil Ochs' "Knock on the Door", and Floyd Tillman's "This Cold War With You".

Chadbourne invented an instrument known as the electric rake by attaching an electric guitar pickup to a rake. He played a duet of electric rake and classical piano with Bob Wiseman on Wiseman's 1991 album Presented by Lake Michigan Soda. He also played the instrument on a Sun Ra tribute album.

== Discography ==
NB: Eugene Chadbourne's complete discography totals over 400 album releases between 1976 and 2026.

- Volume One: Solo Acoustic Guitar (Parachute, 1976)
- Volume Two: Solo Acoustic Guitar (Parachute, 1976)
- Improvised Music from Acoustic Piano and Guitar with Casey Sokol (Music Gallery Editions, 1977)
- Volume Three: Guitar Trios (Parachute, 1977)
- Don't Punk Out with Frank Lowe (QED, 1979)
- 2000 Statues and the English Channel (Parachute, 1979)
- Possibilities of the Color Plastic with Toshinori Kondo (Bellows, 1979)
- There'll Be No Tears Tonight (Parachute, 1980)
- Torture Time! with Polly Bradfield Concert recorded at Logos Studio, Gent, Belgium on April 2, 1981 (Parachute, 1981)
- Blues (Parachute, 1984)
- Country Music of Southeastern Australia (RR, 1984)
- Dinosaur on the Way (self-released, 1984)
- The President; He Is Insane (Iridescence, 1984)
- Country Protest (Fundamental, 1985)
- Corpses of Foreign War (Fundamental, 1986)
- Camper Van Chadbourne with Camper Van Beethoven (Fundamental, 1987)
- LSD C&W – The History of the Chadbournes in America (Fundamental, 1987)
- Dear Eugene, What you did was not very nice, so... Kill Eugene (Placebo, 1987)
- Kultural Terrorism with Rosenberg (Dossier, 1987)
- I've Been Everywhere as The Doctor Eugene Chadbourne (Fundamental, 1988)
- The Eddie Chatterbox Double Trio Love Album (Fundamental, 1989)
- Country Music in the World of Islam Volume XV (Fundamental, 1989)
- Blotter LSD C&W 2001 (Delta, 1992)
- Chadbourne Baptist Church (Delta, 1992)
- Hot Burrito #2 with Werner Dafeldecker and Walter Malli (Extraplatte, 1993)
- Strings (Intakt, 1993)
- Songs (Intakt, 1993)
- Locked in a Dutch Coffeeshop with Jimmy Carl Black (Fundamental, 1993)
- Nismegen Hassen Hunt (House of Chadula, 1995)
- The Acquaduct (Rectangle, 1996)
- Boogie with the Hook (Leo, 1996)
- Jesse Helms Busted with Pornography – The C&W Opera by Eugene Chadbourne (Fire Ant, 1996)
- Psychad (Swamp Room, 1997) (limited to 500 copies)
- Patrizio with Paul Lovens (Les Disques Victo, 1997)

With Noël Akchoté

- Lust Corner (Winter & Winter, 1997)

With Han Bennink and Toshinori Kondo

- Jazz Bunker (Golden Years of New Jazz, 2000)

With Evan Johns

- Vermin of the Blues with Evan Johns & The H-Bombs (Fundamental, 1987)
- Terror Has Some Strange Kinfolk (Alternative Tentacles, 1992)

With Henry Kaiser

- The Guitar Lesson (Les Disques Victo, 1999)

With John Zorn

- School (Parachute, 1978)
- Environment for Sextet with John Zorn, Andrea Centazzo, Tom Cora, Toshinori Kondo, Polly Bradfield (Ictus, 1979)
- In Memory of Nikki Arane (Incus, 1996)

== Books ==
- Dreamory (The House of Chadula, 2013): a 1000+-page book that is a collection of Chadbourne's diaries from his teens to his tours and including his dream diaries
