= Ann Magnuson =

American actress, performance artist, singer

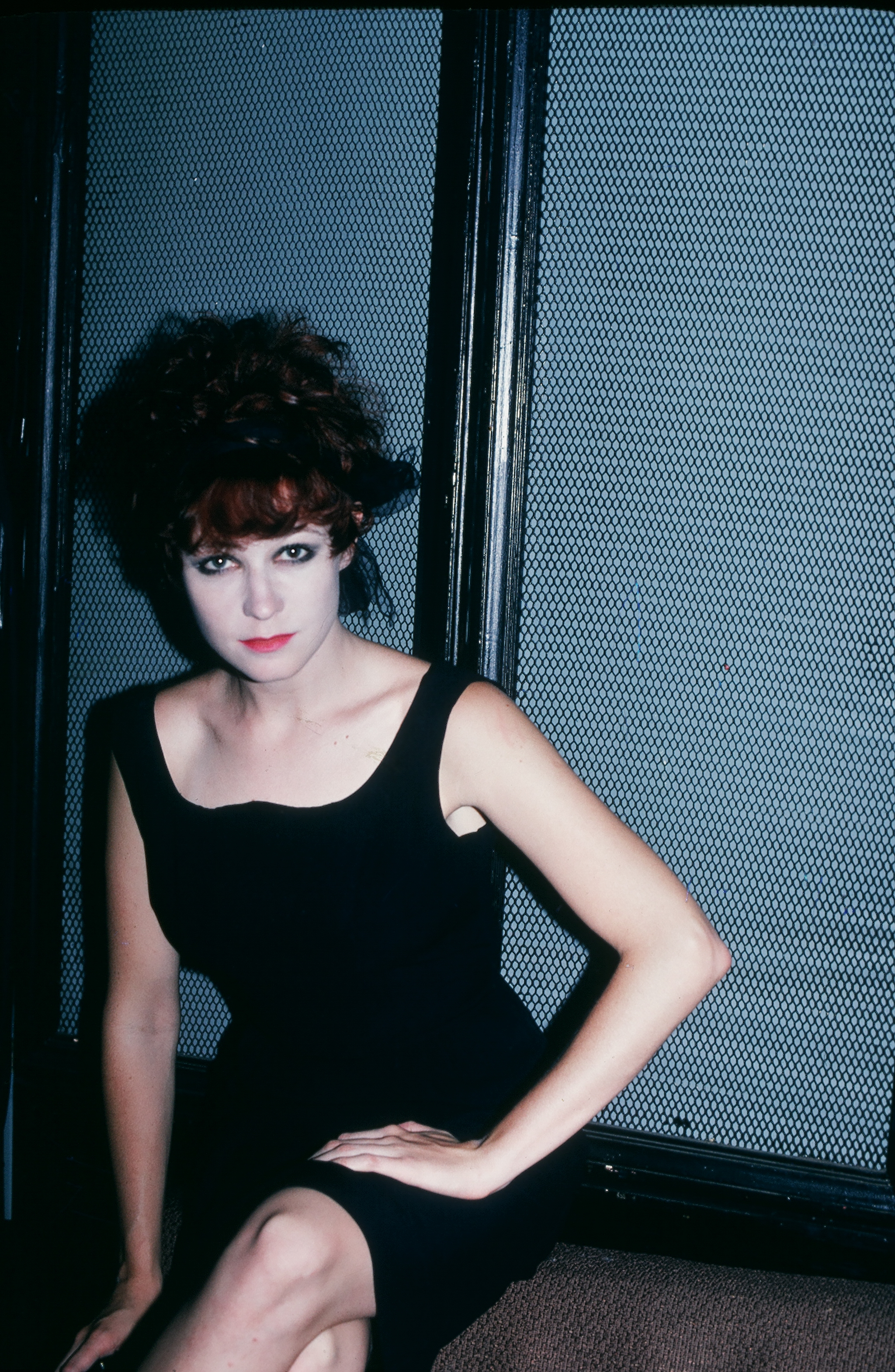
- Ann Magnuson when she was the manager of Club 57 circa early 1980s. Photo by Robert Carrithers
- Education: Denison University
- Occupations: Actress; performance artist
- Years active: 1979–present
- Spouse: John Bertram (m. 2002)
- Website: annmagnuson.com

Ann Magnuson is an American actress, performance artist, and nightclub performer. She was described by The New York Times in 1990 as "An endearing theatrical chameleon who has as many characters at her fingertips as Lily Tomlin does".

A founding member of the 1980s band Bongwater, Magnuson starred in the ABC sitcom Anything but Love (1989–92). Her film appearances include The Hunger (1983), Making Mr. Right (1987), Clear and Present Danger (1994), Panic Room (2002), and One More Time (2015).

== Early life and career ==
Magnuson had a brother, Bobby, who died in 1988 of complications from AIDS. She attended Holz Elementary and George Washington High School in Charleston, West Virginia. After graduating from Denison University in 1978, she moved to New York City and was a DJ and performer at Club 57 and the Mudd Club in Manhattan around 1979 through the early 1980s. She created such characters as Anoushka, a Soviet lounge singer, wearing a wig backwards and singing mock-Russian lyrics to pop music standards, and separately sang in an all-girl percussion group, Pulsallama, whose 1982 single "The Devil Lives In My Husband's Body" was a housewife's lament of a spouse who appears to be possessed. Later, in 1987, Magnuson fronted the satirical faux-heavy metal band Vulcan Death Grip.

In an interview for the 2002 WETA-TV PBS special Lance Loud! A Death in An American Family, Magnuson credited the idea of Lance Loud — a member of an all-American family filmed day-in/day-out for the landmark PBS documentary An American Family, who came out as gay during the course of that documentary miniseries — with inspiring her to leave West Virginia for New York:

I watched An American Family alone in the kitchen and none of my other family members were interested in it, and I was fascinated, as everybody my age was, by Lance, and I really think that's what got me there. I immediately started hanging out at all the clubs that he hung out in, and I wanted to go to the places that I'd seen on television. ... I met him in 1978 when I got to New York City and was hanging out at CBGB. ... I honestly can't remember the exact moment but I know I was dazzled. I was just this little hick from West Virginia and I was meeting a celebrity, an icon, somebody who had made it.

Magnuson made her film debut in the 1981 film Vortex.

In the late '70s and early '80s, Magnuson ran Club 57, located in the basement of the Polish National church. It became a center of a world that included Keith Haring, Kenny Scharf, and many others from New York's budding graffiti and downtown scenes. Club 57 was known for its theme nights such as Reggae Miniature Golf and Model World of Glue Night.

== Prominence ==
A fixture of the Manhattan downtown club scene of the 1980s, Magnuson gained attention with her role as a snarky cigarette girl in director Susan Seidelman's 1985 independent film hit Desperately Seeking Susan, which also helped launch the acting career of singer Madonna. Magnuson went on to star in Seidelman's Making Mr. Right (1987), a poorly received science-fiction romance about an android played by John Malkovich. In 1988, Magnuson appeared in the film Mondo New York, a pseudo-documentary featuring performances of New York’s underground performance stars such as Karen Finley, Joey Arias, Lydia Lunch, John Sex, Phoebe Legere, Dean Johnson, and many more.

Concurrently, Magnuson developed an underground following as lead vocalist of the band Bongwater, formed in 1985 with producer-musician Mark Kramer. Bongwater released four avant garde albums and a debut EP before breaking up in 1992 with a legal battle between Magnuson and Kramer that lasted through at least 1996 and ended with the bankruptcy of Kramer's independent-music label Shimmy-Disc.

Magnuson's 15-minute video performance piece "Made for Television", self-produced in 1981, ran on the WNET-PBS series Alive from Off-Center. Her satiric featurette found her playing close to 50 roles in a "channel-hopping" series of visual bites parodying television programming game shows to TV films to televangelists. As art critic Sarah Valdez described it, "a bewigged Ann Magnuson consecutively inhabits, at a rate faster than any channel surfer could keep up with, an outlandish, uproariously unfortunate range of female stereotypes". It was later released by HBO Home Video, together with the Cinemax cable-TV special Vandemonium (1987), in which Magnuson starred in a mostly solo stage piece with appearances by actor-singer Meat Loaf, performance artist Joey Arias, and actor-monologist Eric Bogosian. Magnuson also co-hosted Alive from Off Center during its 1988 season, taking over from fellow performance artist Laurie Anderson, who had hosted the series the year before.

Her 1995 CD The Luv Show (Geffen Records/MCA), her major-label debut, was commercially unsuccessful, but musically adventurous; one critic described it "an MGM musical as directed by Russ Meyer (which means the mambo 'Sex With The Devil'" and 'Miss Pussy Pants' sit comfortably next to Ethel Merman references in the same work)".

As Salon writer John Paczowski described her in 1997:

[A] celebrated icon in the more transgressive margins of culture, Ann Magnuson has been at once unknown and renowned for the past 15 years. She is infamous in more insular circles as the creative force behind the cultural mayhem of the East Village's Club 57, a breeding ground of experimentation and absurdity that spawned the work of Keith Haring, among others. (Under the auspices of a Club 57 project, Magnuson once performed a "Tribute to Muzak," singing for five hours straight in the elevator of the Whitney Museum.)

== Later career ==
From 1989 to 1992, Magnuson played Catherine Hughes, the comically hip editor-in-chief of a Chicago magazine in the television sitcom Anything But Love, opposite Jamie Lee Curtis and comedian Richard Lewis, and played a liberal political commentator on comedian Wanda Sykes' 2003 Fox sitcom Wanda at Large.

Magnuson's film roles have included a snarly real estate agent in Panic Room, Alan's mother in Small Soldiers, a madam in Tank Girl, Mel Gibson's "money junkie" ex-wife in Tequila Sunrise, Tom Berenger's estranged but horny ex-girlfriend in Love at Large, a secretary in Clear and Present Danger, and a sexy victim of David Bowie's vampire in The Hunger.

Her TV guest appearances include an episode each of the Lifetime cable-network fiction-suspense anthology The Hidden Room; The Adventures of Pete and Pete and Salute Your Shorts on Nickelodeon; the sitcoms The John Larroquette Show, The Drew Carey Show, Caroline in the City, and Frasier; and the police procedural drama CSI: Miami. In the 1996 telefilm The Munsters' Scary Little Christmas She appeared in the 1990 Redd Kross music video for the song "Annie's Gone", written about her. As writer Jason Anderson summarized her work through 1996, "She's been appearing in various states of undress for artistic purposes since her performance art daze in late-'70s New York [where s]he was indie rock's thinking vixen...."

Magnuson appeared in the 1998 music video for Jerry Cantrell's "My Song". In 1997 she provided guest vocals for the band Tindersticks on the song "Buried Bones" from their album "Curtains".

In 2003, Magnuson began touring a one-woman stage show, Pretty Songs & Ugly Stories, which she mounted through at least July 2006. She played Sister Elizabeth Donderstock in the play The Book of Liz, written by Amy Sedaris and David Sedaris, in May 2005 at the 2nd Stage Theatre in Hollywood, California. Other theater work has included playwright John Patrick Shanley's Four Dogs and a Bone at the Lucille Lortel Theater in New York City, the one-woman shows You Could Be Home Now (which opened the 1990 Serious Fun festival at New York City's Lincoln Center), and Rave Mom (opened in New York City October 2001), and in a neo-burlesque show, The Velvet Hammer.

A Village Voice review described the autobiographical Rave Mom as Magnuson's "travels through 1999 — a year of ecstasy-popping, bad romance-chasing and searching for escapism and meaning after her brother's death from AIDS. Magnuson has a thoroughly charming presence [but] her stories of celebrity-studded Oscar parties, kid-filled raves, a wealthy dotcom suitor, and so on, come off as utterly self-absorbed and trivial..."

She has performed at the Revlon/UCLA Breast Center benefit series What A Pair! in 2005, performing with Elaine Hendrix "Tips" from the musical Pump Boys & Dinettes, and 2006, performing with Samantha Shelton. She appeared in What's My Line? Live on Stage in Los Angeles on Sept 14, 2006.

For eight years, Magnuson wrote a monthly column, "LA Woman", in the magazine Paper, as well as an accompanying blog.

In late 2006, Magnuson released her second solo album, Pretty Songs & Ugly Stories. It was produced and co-written by long-time musical director and accompanist Kristian Hoffman, with whom Magnuson had had a creative relationship since meeting him while directing "The New Wave Vaudeville Show" in 1976.

In 2007 and 2008, Magnuson performed in a cabaret act, Dueling Harps, with Adam Dugas, Mia Theodoratus, and Alexander Rannie.

In 2009, Magnuson created a one-woman performance piece, Back Home Again (Dreaming Of Charleston), that was commissioned by Charleston, West Virginia's FestivAll.

In 2018, Magnuson joined the cast of The Man in the High Castle, for five episodes, as Caroline Abendsen, the wife of the title character Hawthorne Abendsen, played by Stephen Root.

Magnuson appeared in the first season of Star Trek: Picard as Fleet Admiral Kirsten Clancy, the commander-in-chief of Starfleet.

Magnuson participated in a staged conversation about Keith Haring with Steven Reigns at The Broad for World AIDS Day 2022.

== Personal life ==
Magnuson married architect John Bertram in 2002. She has described the Los Angeles neighborhood of Silver Lake, where she lives in her Richard Neutra-designed house, as "a rainbow-coalition Mayberry ... You don't get a sense of anybody really flaunting how rich they are."

== Solo albums ==
- The Luv Show (1995)
- Pretty Songs & Ugly Stories (2006)
- Dream Girl (2016)

== Filmography ==
=== Film ===
Year	Title	Role	Notes
1981	Vortex	Pamela Fleming	
1983	The Hunger	Young Woman from Disco	
1984	Perfect Strangers	Malda	
1985	Desperately Seeking Susan	Cigarette Girl	
1986	Sleepwalk	Isabelle	
1987	Making Mr. Right	Frankie Stone	
1988	A Night in the Life of Jimmy Reardon	Joyce Fickett	
1988	Tequila Sunrise	Shaleen McKussic	
1989	Checking Out	Connie Hagen	
1990	Love at Large	Doris	
1994	Cabin Boy	Calli	
1994	Clear and Present Danger	Moira Wolfson	
1995	Tank Girl	The Madame	Uncredited role
1996	Before and After	Terry Taverner	
1997	Levitation	Sarah	
1997	Still Breathing	Elaine	
1998	Small Soldiers	Irene Abernathy	
1999	Friends & Lovers	Katherine	
2000	Love & Sex	Monique Steinbacher	
2000	Housebound	Brandy	
2001	The Caveman's Valentine	Moira Leppenraub	
2001	Glitter	Kelly	
2001	Night at the Golden Eagle	Sally	
2002	Panic Room	Lydia Lynch	
2003	The United States of Leland	Karen Pollard	
2003	Ghostlight	Barbara Rosen	
2004	Open House	Sarah Jane Tibbett	
2004	The Nomi Song	Herself	Interviewee
2007	Chasing Tchaikovsky	Margarita Stone	
2010	Happiness Runs	Chad's Mom	
2011	Small Pond	Luann	
2011	Woman's Picture	Miriam	
2011	Rose	Miriam Masterson	Short film
2012	Jobriath A.D.	Herself	Interviewee
2013	Only Child	Miriam Masterson (voice)	
2015	One More Time	Lucille	
2017	Mansfield 66/67	The Voice of Jayne Mansfield	

=== Television ===
Year	Title	Role	Notes
1987	Tales from Hollywood Hills: A Table at Ciro's	Darlene	TV film
1988	Alive From Off Center	presenter	PBS arts anthology series
1989–1992	Anything but Love	Catherine Hughes	Main role (50 episodes)
1993	The Hidden Room	Nina	Episode: "No Word for Mercy"
1996	The Adventures of Pete & Pete	Eunice Puell	Episode: "Crisis in the Love Zone"
1996	The John Larroquette Show	Amanda Cox	Episode: "Black and White and Red All Over"
1996	The Munsters' Scary Little Christmas	Lily Munster	TV film
1997	Caroline in the City	Gina Pennetti	Episode: "Caroline and the Kept Man"
1997	The Drew Carey Show	Kyra Sullivan	Episode: "Check Out Drew's Old Flame"
1997	Damian Cromwell's Postcards from America	Paula	TV film
1998	From the Earth to the Moon	Dee O'Hara	TV miniseries
2002	The Griffin and the Minor Canon	Bird	TV film
2002	The Groovenians	Dully (Glindy's Mom) / Zazzy / Lalasha	TV pilot
2003	Wanda at Large	Rita Bahlberg	Episode: "Wanda & Bradley"
2003–2008	All Grown Up!	Miss O'Keats (voice)	Recurring role
2004	Frasier	Harvest	Episode: "Match Game"
2004	Quintuplets	Yolanda	Episode: "Working It"
2004	CSI: Miami	Ms. Arena	Episode: "Crime Wave"
2006	Our House	Geena	TV film
2007	American Dad!	Lisa Collins (voice)	Episode: "I Can't Stan You"
2009	Valentine	Circe	Episode: "Hound Dog"
2013	Modern Family	Shelley	Episode: "Goodnight Gracie"
2013	The Young and the Restless	Madame Miranda	TV series
2014	Looking	Stina	Episodes: "Looking for Now", "Looking at Your Browser History"
2018	Superior Donuts	Irene	Episode: "The Chicago Way"
2018-2019	The Man in the High Castle	Caroline Abendsen	Episodes: "Now More Than Ever, We Care About You", "History Ends", "Excess Animus", "Baku", "Jahr Null", "Happy Trails"
2019	Titans	Jillian	2 episodes
2020	Star Trek: Picard	Fleet Admiral Kirsten Clancy	2 episodes
2021	Gossip Girl	Donna Calloway	Episode: "You Can't Take It with Jules"

== Audio ==
- Morning Becomes Eclectic (KCRW radio interview, Jan 25, 1996)
- Magnuson appeared on Ken Reid's TV Guidance Counselor podcast on September 21, 2016.
