= David Licht =

American drummer

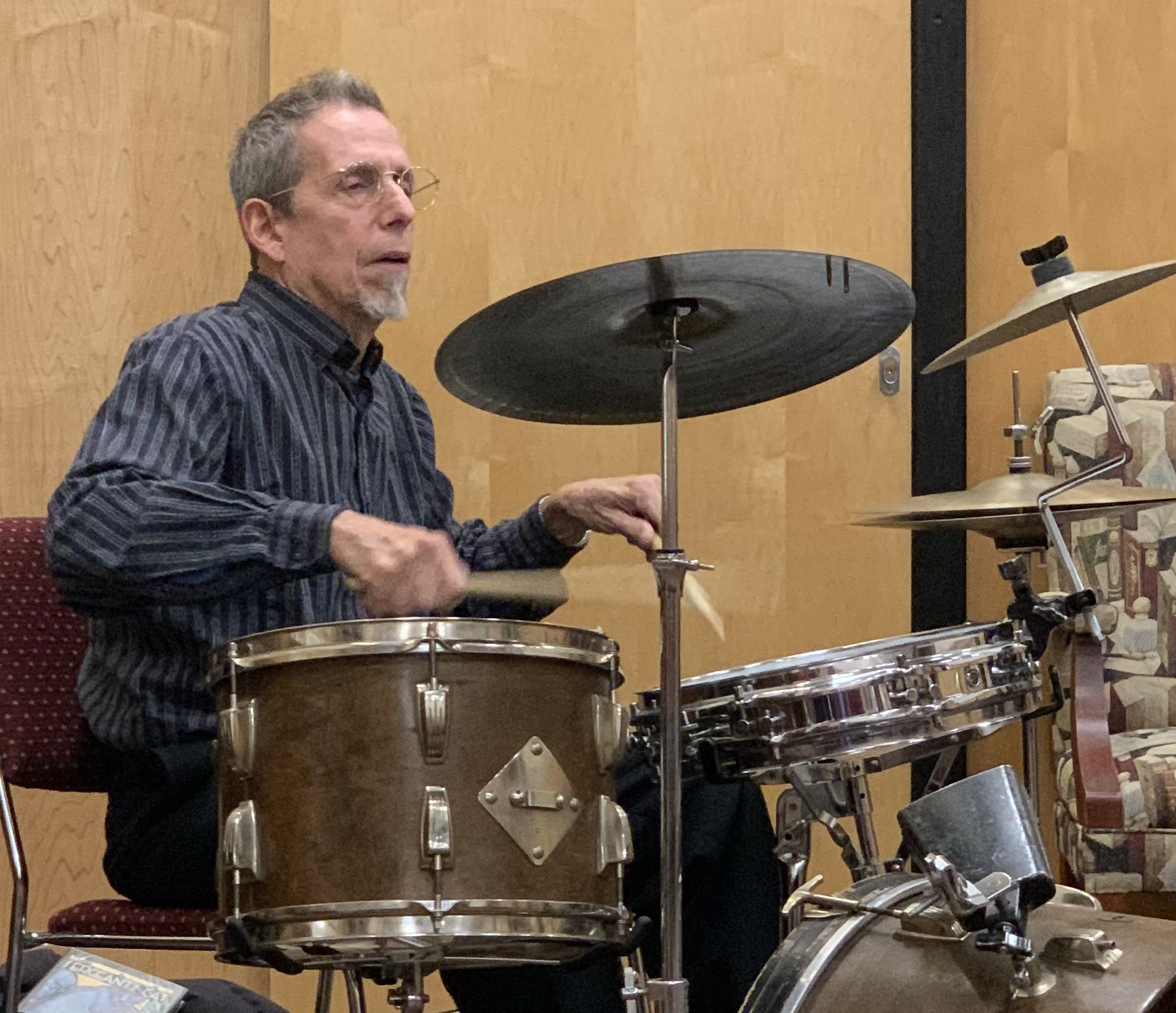
- David Licht playing in a Klezmer concert in Philadelphia 2025

Background information
- Born: 1954 (age 71–72); Detroit, Michigan, United States
- Genres: Klezmer, jazz, rock, blues, folk
- Occupation: Drummer
- Years active: 1967–present
- Formerly of: In-Time, The Chadbournes, Shockabilly, Bongwater, B.A.L.L., When People Were Shorter and Lived Near the Water, The Klezmatics
- Website: davidlicht.com

David Licht (born 1954 in Detroit, Michigan) is a drummer and a founding member of the Grammy Award-winning American Klezmer band The Klezmatics.

== Biography ==
Licht grew up in Greensboro, North Carolina, where he received his first drum kit at his 1967 bar mitzvah and played in early local bands including the Sentinel Boys, Tornado, and the Swamp Cats, as well as the UNCG big band, studying with jazz drummer Sammy Anflick. He played in a local jazz group In-Time starting around 1977. In the early 1980's, he played with The Chadbournes. He has worked as a painter and plasterer since 1974, alongside his music.

In 1985, Licht moved to New York City to help manage a recording studio and joined the band Bongwater. In New York he was able to find other musicians who shared his love of klezmer music, and he helped found The Klezmatics along with Frank London, Paul Morrissett, Lorin Sklamberg, and Alicia Svigals in 1986. He also played with Shockabilly, B.A.L.L., and When People Were Shorter and Lived Near the Water.

Since the 2010s, Licht has performed with Michael Winograd and the Honorable Mentshn, appearing on the albums Kosher Style (2019) and Early Bird Special (2022), and he played on Winograd's 2025 live recreation of the 1956 album Tanz!.
