= Deus discography =

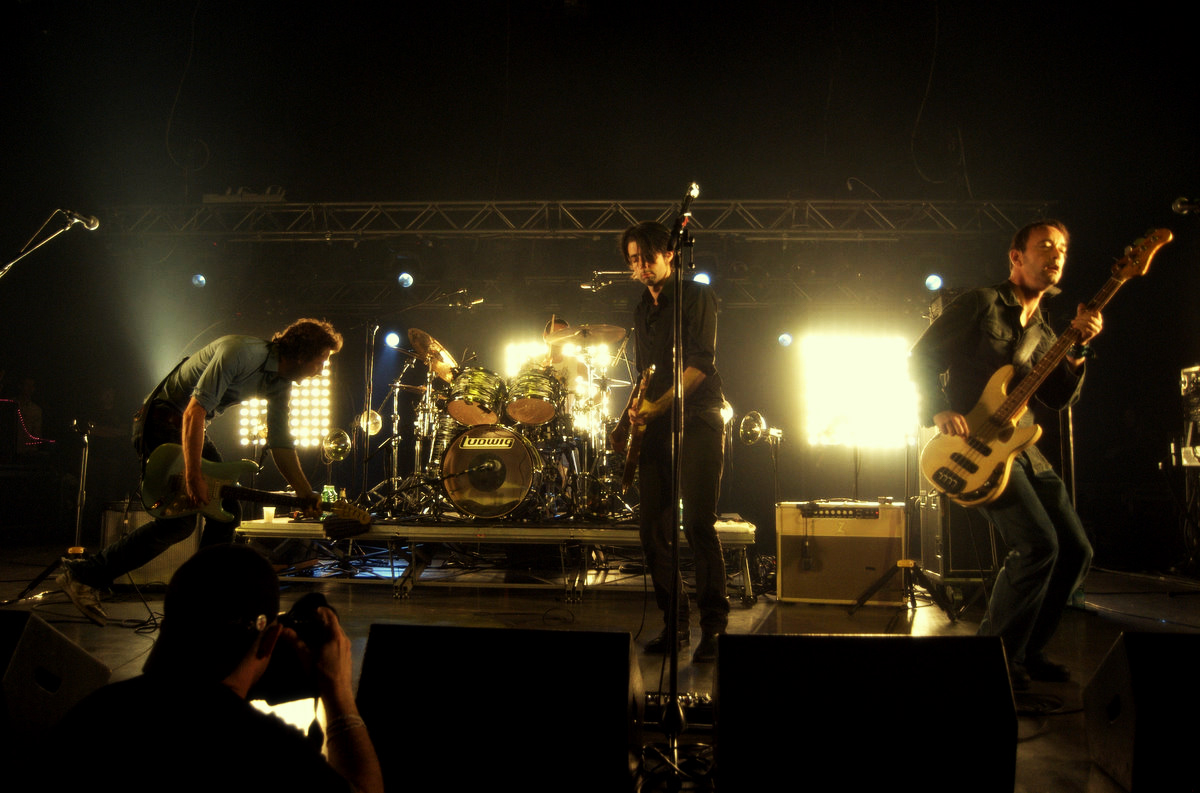
- Studio albums: 7
- Extended plays: 2
- Compilation albums: 2
- Singles: 22
- Video albums: 1

The discography of Belgian rock band Deus includes 7 studio albums, 2 compilation albums, 2 EPs, and 22 singles.

== Albums ==
=== Studio albums ===
Title	Details	Peak chart positions										Certifications
Title	Details	BEL (FL)	BEL (WA)	AUT	FRA	GER	ITA	NLD	POR	SWI	UK	Certifications
Worst Case Scenario	Released: 1994; Label: Island	14	35	—	—	—	—	—	—	—	90	BEA: Gold
In a Bar, Under the Sea	Released: 1996; Label: Island	2	6	—	—	—	—	59	—	—	77	BEA: Platinum
The Ideal Crash	Released: 1999; Label: Island	2	14	—	48	80	—	30	—	—	64	BEA: Gold
Pocket Revolution	Released: 2005; Label: V2	1	6	58	27	67	61	9	30	54	—	BEA: Platinum
Vantage Point	Released: 2008; Label: V2	1	3	57	40	65	78	7	—	57	—	BEA: Platinum
Keep You Close	Released: 2011; Label: PIAS	1	3	56	32	67	—	3	—	38	—	BEA: Platinum
Following Sea	Released: 2012; Label: PIAS	1	3	—	90	—	—	7	—	39	—	BEA: Gold
How to Replace It	Released: 17 February 2023; Label: PIAS	1	3	—	124	32	—	7	—	42	—	
"—" denotes a recording that did not chart or was not released in that territory.

=== Compilation albums ===
Title	Details	Peak chart positions	
Title	Details	BEL (FL)	BEL (WA)
No More Loud Music	Released: 2001; Label: Island	8	—
Selected Songs 1994–2014	Released: 2014; Label: PIAS	8	59
"—" denotes a recording that did not chart or was not released in that territory.

=== Video albums ===
Title	Details
No More Video	Released: 2002; Label: Island

== Extended plays ==
Title	Details	Peak chart positions	
Title	Details	BEL (FL)	BEL (WA)
Zea	Released: 1993; Label: Bang!	—	—
My Sister = My Clock	Released: 1995; Label: Bang!, Island	3	22
"—" denotes a recording that did not chart or was not released in that territory.

== Singles ==
Title	Year	Peak chart positions				Album
Title	Year	BEL (FL)	BEL (WA)	NLD	UK	Album
"Suds & Soda"	1994	—	—	—	79	Worst Case Scenario
"Via"	1994	—	—	—	95	Worst Case Scenario
"Hotellounge (Be the Death of Me)"	1994	—	—	—	55	Worst Case Scenario
"Theme from Turnpike"	1996	—	—	—	68	In a Bar, Under the Sea
"Little Arithmetics"	1996	40	—	—	44	In a Bar, Under the Sea
"Roses"	1996	63	—	—	56	In a Bar, Under the Sea
"Fell Off the Floor, Man"	1997	62	—	—	—	In a Bar, Under the Sea
"Instant Street"	1999	48	—	—	49	The Ideal Crash
"Sister Dew"	1999	68	—	—	62	The Ideal Crash
"The Ideal Crash"	1999	67	—	—	—	The Ideal Crash
"Nothing Really Ends"	2001	30	—	—	—	No More Loud Music
"If You Don't Get What You Want"	2004	—	—	—	—	Pocket Revolution
"7 Days, 7 Weeks"	2005	53	—	—	—	Pocket Revolution
"What We Talk About (When We Talk About Love)"	2006	56	—	—	—	Pocket Revolution
"Bad Timing"	2006	—	—	—	—	Pocket Revolution
"The Architect"	2008	2	25	—	—	Vantage Point
"Slow"	2008	43	—	—	—	Vantage Point
"Eternal Woman"	2008	35	—	—	—	Vantage Point
"When She Comes Down"	2008	49	—	—	—	Vantage Point
"Favourite Game"	2008	57	—	—	—	Vantage Point
"Smokers Reflect"	2008	58	—	—	—	Vantage Point
"Constant Now"	2011	14	—	92	—	Keep You Close
"Keep You Close"	2011	49	—	—	—	Keep You Close
"Ghost"	2011	54	—	—	—	Keep You Close
"Quatre Mains"	2012	10	40	—	—	Following Sea
"The Soft Fall"	2012	58	—	—	—	Following Sea
"Sirens"	2013	60	—	—	—	Following Sea
"Must Have Been New"	2022	—	—	—	—	How to Replace It
"1989"	2023	—	—	—	—	How to Replace It
"—" denotes a recording that did not chart or was not released in that territory.
