= Selected Songs 1994–2014 =

Compilation album by dEUS
- Released: 24 November 2014
- Label: PIAS Recordings

DEUS chronology
Following Sea (2012)	Selected Songs 1994–2014 (2014)	How to Replace It (2023)

Professional ratings
Review scores
Source	Rating
DrownedInSound	9/10
The Music (magazine)	4.5/5 stars
Soul Kitchen	9/10
COREandCO	7.5/10
SENTIREASCOLTARE	6.5/10
Plattentests.de	8/10

Selected Songs 1994–2014 is a compilation album by Belgian rock band dEUS, released in November 2014 in double compact disc format. It covers songs from the band's first seven studio albums plus a live version of the song "Sun Ra" from their 2005 album Pocket Revolution. It was described by Charlie Frame of The Quietus as " a fantastic collection of songs". The album cover features a collage of the artwork from the band's first seven studio albums and their 1993 EP, Zea.

== Track listing ==
=== CD 1 ===
All lyrics are written by Barman (except track 1 Ward, Barman; track 7 & 12 Carlens, Barman; and track 10 Ward, Trouvé, Carlens, Barman).

No.	Title	Music	Originally released on	Length
1.	"Instant Street"	Ward; Mommens; Barman	The Ideal Crash	6:13
2.	"The Architect"	Gevaert; Janzoons; Pawlowski; Misseghers; Barman	Vantage Point	3:57
3.	"Little Arithmetics"	Ward; Barman	In a Bar, Under the Sea	4:29
4.	"Constant Now"	Gevaert; Janzoons; Pawlowski; Misseghers; Barman	Keep You Close	3:45
5.	"Hotellounge (Be The Death Of Me)"	Trouvé; Barman	Worst Case Scenario	6:23
6.	"Slow"	Gevaert; Janzoons; Pawlowski; Misseghers; Barman	Vantage Point	6:09
7.	"Roses"	Barman	In a Bar, Under the Sea	4:52
8.	"Via"	Meyers; Barman	Worst Case Scenario	4:11
9.	"Quatre Mains"	Gevaert; Janzoons; Pawlowski; Misseghers	Following Sea	4:54
10.	"Fell Off The Floor, Man"	Ward; De Borgher; Carlens; Barman	In a Bar, Under the Sea	5:14
11.	"Sun Ra (Live at A38 Budapest)"	Gevaert; Janzoons; Pawlowski; Misseghers; Barman	Pocket Revolution	6:13
12.	"Suds & Soda"	De Borgher; Janzoons; Trouvé; Carlens; Barman	Worst Case Scenario	5:13
13.	"Theme From Turnpike"	Barman	In a Bar, Under the Sea	5:46
14.	"Ghost"	Gevaert; Janzoons; Pawlowski; Misseghers; Barman	Keep You Close	4:33
15.	"Bad Timing"	Gevaert; Janzoons; Pawlowski; Misseghers; Barman	Pocket Revolution	7:07

=== CD 2 ===
All lyrics are written by Barman (except tracks 4 & 13: Ward, Barman); all music is composed by Barman (except where noted).

No.	Title	Music	Originally released on	Length
1.	"The Real Sugar"		Pocket Revolution	3:57
2.	"Nothing Really Ends"		Pocket Revolution	5:28
3.	"Serpentine"		In a Bar, Under the Sea	3:18
4.	"Magic Hour"	Ward; Barman	The Ideal Crash	5:24
5.	"Eternal Woman"	Pawlowski; Barman	Vantage Point	4:23
6.	"Right As Rain"		Zea (EP)	4:22
7.	"Include Me Out"		Pocket Revolution	5:01
8.	"7 Days, 7 Weeks"	Ward; Barman	Pocket Revolution	3:54
9.	"Nothings"	Gevaert; Janzoons; Pawlowski; Misseghers; Barman	Following Sea	2:29
10.	"Wake Me Up Before I Sleep"		In a Bar, Under the Sea	2:55
11.	"Smokers Reflect"		Vantage Point	4:27
12.	"Secret Hell"		Worse Case Scenario	5:00
13.	"Magdalena"	Ward; Mommens; Barman	The Ideal Crash	4:58
14.	"Disappointed In The Sun"	Jorens; Barman	In a Bar, Under the Sea	6:04
15.	"Twice (We Survive)"	Gevaert; Janzoons; Pawlowski; Misseghers; Barman	Keep You Close	4:31

== Charts ==
Chart (2014)	Peak position
Belgian Albums (Ultratop Flanders)	8
Belgian Albums (Ultratop Wallonia)	59
