= Zamu Music Awards =

Annual awards show in Flanders, Belgium

The Zamu Music Awards was an annual awards show in Flanders (Belgium), where the most outstanding Flemish and international musicians of the past year were honored.

The Zamu Awards were founded ZaMu (Zangers en Muzikanten; the Flemish association of singers and musicians). ZaMu was discontinued in 2006, but the organization of the Zamu Awards was taken over by Muziekcentrum Vlaanderen (Flanders Music Center), under the name Music Industry Awards (MIA's).

For most award categories, a jury of music journalists selects four nominees. The winners are voted by members of the Flemish music industry, such as musicians, managers and record labels. Exceptions are the awards for best song and best music DVD, where the votes of the public select the winner.

A special award is the Lifetime Achievement Award, given each year to an artist to honor his or her complete creative career.

== Awards winners ==
=== 2006 ===
Artists:

- Musician: Isolde Lasoen
- Singer: An Pierlé
- Live-act: dEUS
- Popular: Reborn
- Pop-rock: Ozark Henry
- Dance: Buscemi
- Roots: Wannes Van de Velde
- Focus: Goose
- Jazz: Alejandro Del Real

Records:

- Album: Wild Dreams of New Beginnings Admiral Freebee
- Song: The Player Daan
- Video: The Player Daan
- Art Work: Jardin Secret Axelle Red

Lifetime Achievement Award: Bobbejaan Schoepen

=== 2005 ===
Artists:

- Songwriter/composer: Tom Barman
- Musician: Mauro Pawlowski
- Singer: Bert Ostyn (Absynthe Minded)
- Live-act: Gabriel Ríos
- Popular: Sandrine
- Pop-rock: dEUS
- Dance: Arsenal
- Roots: Roland Van Campenhout
- Focus: Delavega
- International: The Black Eyed Peas

Records:

- Album: Pocket Revolution (dEUS)
- Song: "My Heroics, Part 1" (Absynthe Minded)
- Video: "I'm on a High" (Millionaire)
- Music DVD: Easter Sunday, live at AB (Ozark Henry)

Lifetime Achievement Award: Dani Klein (Vaya Con Dios)

=== 2004 ===
Artists:

- Songwriter/composer: Piet Goddaer
- Musician: Steven De Bruyn
- Singer: Joost Zweegers (Novastar)
- Live-act: Clouseau
- Popular: Natalia
- Pop-rock: Zita Swoon
- Dance: Stijn
- Roots: Think of One
- Focus: Gabriel Ríos
- International: Joss Stone

Records:

- Album: Victory (Daan)
- Song: "Sadness" (Stash)
- Video: "Sadness" (Stash)

Lifetime Achievement Award: Raymond van het Groenewoud

=== 2003 ===
Artists:

- Songwriter/composer: Tom Van Laere (Admiral Freebee)
- Musician: Mauro Pawlowski
- Singer: Geike Arnaert
- Live-act: El Tattoo del Tigre
- Popular: Scala
- Pop-rock: Admiral Freebee
- Dance: Buscemi
- Roots: Roland
- Focus: Sioen
- International: Avril Lavigne

Records:

- Album: Admiral Freebee (Admiral Freebee)
- Song: "Rags 'n Run" (Admiral Freebee)
- Video: "Champagne" (Phil Dussol / Millionaire)

Musical industry:

- Producer: Jean Blaute
- Musical event: Lokerse Feesten
- Media: Brussel Vlaams (Studio Brussel)

Lifetime Achievement Award: Johan Verminnen

=== 2002 ===
Artists:

- Songwriter/composer: Daan Stuyven
- Musician: Philip Catherine
- Singer: Axelle Red
- Live-act: Arno
- Popular: Clouseau
- Pop-rock: Hooverphonic
- Dance: 2 Many DJs
- Roots: Think Of One
- Focus: Neeka
- International: Britney Spears

Records:

- Album: Jacky Cane (Hooverphonic)
- Song: "En Dans" (Clouseau)

Musical industry:

- Producer: Jean-Marie Aerts
- Musical event: Pukkelpop
- Media: All Areas (Studio Brussel)

Lifetime Achievement Award: Adamo

=== 2001 ===
Artists:

- Songwriter/composer: Marc Moulin
- Musician: Mauro Pawlowski
- Singer: Mauro Pawlowski
- Live-act: El Tattoo Del Tigre
- Popular: Clouseau
- Pop-rock: Ozark Henry
- Dance: Buscemi
- Roots: El Fish & Roland
- Focus: Flip Kowlier
- International: blink-182

Records:

- Album: Ocharme ik (Flip Kowlier)
- Song: "Nothing Really Ends" (dEUS)

Musical industry:

- Producer: Piet Goddaer
- Musical event: Pukkelpop
- Media: Pili Pili (Radio 1)

Lifetime Achievement Award: Philip Catherine

=== 2000 ===
Artists:

- Songwriter/composer: Joost Zweegers (Novastar)
- Musician: Lars Van Bambost
- Singer: Geike Arnaert
- Live-act: De Nieuwe Snaar
- Popular: Belle Perez
- Pop-rock: Hooverphonic
- Dance: Buscemi
- Roots: Laïs
- Focus: Das Pop
- International: Eminem

Records:

- Album: Novastar (Novastar)
- Song: "Mad About You" (Hooverphonic)

Musical industry:

- Producer: Alex Callier
- Musical event: Rock Werchter
- Media: Plankenkoorts - Zomerfestivals (Canvas)

Lifetime Achievement Award: Willem Vermandere

=== 1999 ===
Artists:

- Artist: Soulwax
- Dutch-language artist: Raymond van het Groenewoud
- Musician: Bart Maris
- Songwriter/composer: Piet Goddaer
- Singing: Laïs
- Live-act: Soulwax
- Dance: Jan Van Biesen
- Focus: Arid (band)
- International: Madonna

Records:

- Album: Out of Africa (Helmut Lotti)
- Song: "My Bond With You And Your Planet: Disco!" (Zita Swoon)

Musical industry:

- Producer: Alex Callier
- Recording studio: Galaxy
- Musical event: De Nachten
- Media: Belgian Pop & Rock Archives

Lifetime Achievement Award: Rocco Granata

=== 1998 ===
Artists:

- Band: K's Choice
- Dutch-language band: Gorki
- Musician: Vincent Pierins
- Songwriter/composer: Raymond van het Groenewoud
- Singer: Axelle Red
- Dutch-language singer: Raymond van het Groenewoud
- Live-act: El Fish
- Jazz-act: Aka Moon
- Functional music: Fonny Dewulf
- Breakthrough: Dead Man Ray
- International: Backstreet Boys

Records:

- Album cover: Much Against Everyone's Advice (Soulwax)

Musical industry:

- Producer: Jean Blaute
- Technician: Peter Bulckens
- Recording studio: Groove
- Musical event: Folkfestival Dranouter
- Music venue: AB
- Music photographer: Marco Mertens
- Music journalist: Jan Delvaux
- Radio program: Cucamonga (Radio 1)
- TV program: Dancing in the street (VRT)

Lifetime Achievement Award: Roland

=== 1997 ===
Artists:

- Band: K's Choice
- Dutch-language band: De Mens
- Songwriter/composer: Stef Kamil Carlens
- Musician: Vincent Pierins
- Singer: Axelle Red
- Dutch-language singer: Frank Vander Linden (De Mens)
- Live-act: Arno
- Jazz-act: Aka Moon
- Functional music: Stef Kamil Carlens
- Breakthrough: Hoodoo Club
- Musical export: K's Choice
- International: Jamiroquai

Records:

- Album (sales): Lotti Goes Classic 3 (Helmut Lotti)
- Single (sales): "Als de dag van toen" (Mama's Jasje)
- Airplay: "Als de dag van toen" (Mama's Jasje)
- Album cover: Seven (Zap Mama)

Musical industry:

- Producer: Jean Blaute
- Technician: Peter Bulckens
- Recording studio: Galaxy
- Music venue: AB
- Musical event: Folkfestival Dranouter
- Music journalist: Gert Van Nieuwenhoven
- Music photographer: Guy Kocken
- Radio program: BasSta! (Studio Brussel)
- TV program: Lalala Live (VTM)

Lifetime Achievement Award: Arno

=== 1996 ===
Artists:

- Band: dEUS
- Dutch-language band: Clouseau
- Songwriter/composer: Tom Barman
- Musician: Vincent Pierins
- Singer: Axelle Red
- Dutch-language singer: Frank Vander Linden (De Mens)
- Live-act: Evil Superstars
- Jazz-act: Kris Defoort
- Functional music: Noordkaap
- Entertaining band: Lou Roman
- Breakthrough: Hoover
- Musical export: Best Of (Vaya Con Dios)
- International: Björk

Records:

- Album: In a Bar, Under the Sea (dEUS)
- Single: "Little Arithmetics" (dEUS)
- Video: "Theme From Turnpike" (dEUS)
- Album cover: Love Is Okay (Evil Superstars/Herman Houbrechts)

Musical industry:

- Manager: Piet Roelen
- Producer: Jean Blaute
- Technician: Peter Bulckens
- Recording studio: Galaxy
- Music venue: AB
- Musical event: Pukkelpop
- Music journalist: Patrick De Witte
- Music photographer: Guy Kocken
- Radio presenter: Jan Hautekiet
- Radio program: BasSta!
- TV program: Tien Om Te Zien

Lifetime Achievement Award: Will Tura

=== 1995 ===
Artists:

- Band: K's Choice
- Songwriter/composer: Gert Bettens
- Dutch-language band: Clouseau
- Musician: Eric Melaerts (Soulsister)
- Singer: Sarah Bettens
- Dutch-language singer: Dana Winner
- Live-act: Ashbury Faith
- Breakthrough: Moondog Jr.
- Musical export: 2 Unlimited
- International: Green Day

Records:

- Album: Everyday I Wear a Greasy Black feather on my Hat (Moondog Jr.)
- Single: "Not an Addict" (K's Choice)

Musical industry:

- Musical event: Torhout-Werchter
- Music journalist: Marc Didden
- Music photographer: Jo Clauwaert
- Radio presenter: Jan Hautekiet
- Radio program: BasSta!
- TV program: Rock Rapport (Ka2)

Lifetime Achievement Award: Wannes Vandevelde

=== 1994 ===
Artists:

- Band: dEUS
- Dutch-language band: Noordkaap
- Musician: Eric Melaerts (Soulsister)
- Singer: Axelle Red
- Dutch-language singer: Isabelle A.
- Live-act: Dinky Toys
- Breakthrough: dEUS
- International: Whitney Houston

Records:

- Album: Worst Case Scenario (dEUS)
- Album cover: Soulsister
- Single: "Hemelsblauw" (Will Tura)
- Video: "Via" (dEUS)

Musical industry:

- Manager: Soulsister
- Producer: Wouter Van Belle
- Record label: Double T Music
- Musical event: Marktrock
- Promotor: Herman Schueremans
- Radio or TV presenter: Jan Hautekiet
- Radio or TV program: De Gewapende Man (Jan Hautekiet)
- Film music: Suite 16

Lifetime Achievement Award: Toots Thielemans
