= No More Loud Music =

Greatest hits album by dEUS
- Released: November 23, 2001
- Genre: Rock
- Length: 58:44
- Label: Island

No More Loud Music is a singles collection of the Belgian rock band dEUS, released in 2001. In contains, in chronological order, the singles from the albums Worst Case Scenario, In a Bar, Under the Sea and The Ideal Crash, and one new single, "Nothing Really Ends".

== Track listing ==
No.	Title	Writer(s)	Length
1.	"Suds & Soda"	Tom Barman; Jules de Borgher; Stef Kamil Carlens; Klaas Janzoons; Rudy Trouvé	5:17
2.	"Via"	Barman; Marc Meyens	4:11
3.	"Hotellounge (Be The Death Of Me)"	Barman; Trouvé	6:36
4.	"Theme From Turnpike"	Barman	5:46
5.	"Little Arithmetics"	Barman; Craig Ward	4:34
6.	"Roses"	Barman	4:52
7.	"Fell Of The Floor, Man"	Barman; Carlens; De Borgher; Ward	5:13
8.	"Instant Street"	Barman; Danny Mommens; Ward	6:15
9.	"Sister Dew"	Barman; Ward	5:33
10.	"The Ideal Crash"	Barman	5:00
11.	"Nothing Really Ends"	Barman	5:27
Total length:			58:44
