= Pocket Revolution =

Studio album by dEUS
- Released: 12 September 2005
- Genre: Indie rock
- Length: 61:17
- Label: Universal, V2
- Producer: dEUS

DEUS chronology
The Ideal Crash (1999)	Pocket Revolution (2005)	Vantage Point (2008)

Professional ratings
Review scores
Source	Rating
AllMusic	3.5/5 stars
Pitchfork	(7.8/10)

Pocket Revolution is the fourth studio album by dEUS, released in 2005. The cover art is based on The Von Neumann-Machine, a story from Don Lawrence's Storm series of graphic novels.

Pocket Revolution was the first dEUS studio album to be released in six years, since The Ideal Crash in 1999. The band featuring Craig Ward and Danny Mommens disintegrated during its recording. Ward, who was supposed to produce the record, left the band in August 2004, soon followed by Mommens. They were replaced by ex-Evil Superstars guitarist Mauro Pawlowski and bass player Alan Gevaert, who completed the recording of the album. Other contributions include Stef Kamil Carlens doing backing vocals on Pocket Revolution and Sun Ra, CJ Bolland, and Tim Vanhamel of Millionaire (who used to play guitar with dEUS on The Ideal Crash tour). The release of the album was followed by a one-year tour that led the band through Europe and to the United States, Canada, Israel and Thailand. It was the longest tour dEUS ever did.

Pocket Revolution became the best selling dEUS record in Belgium, selling more than 50,000 copies - making it Platinum. The album sold about 200,000 copies worldwide.

In December 2006, Pocket Revolution was re-released as Pocket Revolution Burnt. It contains a bonus cd with seven songs from the album remixed by Jagz Kooner, titled The Jagz Kooner Excursions.

In February 2007, a Pocket Revolution songbook with lyrics and chords for all twelve songs of the album was released by Beriato Group. It is the first songbook to be dedicated to dEUS .

== Track listing ==
No.	Title	Writer(s)	Length
1.	"Bad Timing"	Tom Barman; dEUS	7:07
2.	"7 Days, 7 Weeks"	Barman; Craig Ward	3:53
3.	"Stop-Start Nature"	dEUS; C.J. Bolland	4:28
4.	"If You Don't Get What You Want"	Barman	3:49
5.	"What We Talk About (When We Talk About Love)"	Barman	4:44
6.	"Include Me Out"	Barman	5:02
7.	"Pocket Revolution"	Barman; dEUS	6:01
8.	"Night Shopping"	Barman	4:03
9.	"Cold Sun of Circumstance"	dEUS	5:44
10.	"The Real Sugar"	Barman	3:58
11.	"Sun Ra"	dEUS	6:43
12.	"Nothing Really Ends"	Barman	5:35
Total length:			61:17

== Charts ==
=== Weekly charts ===
Chart (2005)	Peak position
Austrian Albums (Ö3 Austria)	58
Belgian Albums (Ultratop Flanders)	1
Belgian Albums (Ultratop Wallonia)	6
Dutch Albums (Album Top 100)	9
French Albums (SNEP)	27
German Albums (Offizielle Top 100)	67
Italian Albums (FIMI)	61
Portuguese Albums (AFP)	30
Swiss Albums (Schweizer Hitparade)	54

=== Year-end charts ===
Chart (2005)	Position
Belgian Albums (Ultratop Flanders)	6
Belgian Albums (Ultratop Wallonia)	60

== Singles ==
- "7 Days, 7 Weeks" (August 2005)
- "What We Talk About (When We Talk About Love)" (March 2006)
- "Bad Timing" (download only release, June 2006)
