= How to Replace It =

2023 studio album by dEUS

Studio album by dEUS
- Released: 17 February 2023
- Studio: MICP Studios (Brussels, Belgium)
- Length: 55:49
- Label: Play It Again Sam
- Producer: Adam Noble

DEUS chronology
Selected Songs 1994–2014 (2014)	How to Replace It (2023)

How to Replace It is the eighth studio album by Belgian rock band dEUS. It was released on 17 February 2023 through PIAS Recordings. The album marked the band's first studio release in more than a decade, following Following Sea (2012).

== Track listing ==
All lyrics are written by Tom Barman; all music is composed by dEUS.

No.	Title	Length
1.	"How to Replace It"	5:30
2.	"Must Have Been New"	3:46
3.	"Man of the House"	5:12
4.	"1989 (featuring Lies Lorquet)"	5:05
5.	"Faux Bamboo"	4:27
6.	"Dream Is a Giver"	4:35
7.	"Pirates"	4:42
8.	"Simple Pleasures"	3:32
9.	"Never Get You High"	3:36
10.	"Why Think It Over (Cadillac)"	5:07
11.	"Love Breaks Down"	3:42
12.	"Le Blues Polaire"	6:36

== Personnel ==
dEUS

- Tom Barman – vocals, guitar, bass, piano, synth
- Klaas Janzoons – violin, piano, synth, organ, clavichord, backing vocals
- Bruno De Groote – guitar, banjo
- Alan Gevaert – bass, guitar, backing vocals
- Stéphane Misseghers – drums, percussion, timpani, vocals, backing vocals

Additional personnel

- Joris Caluwaerts – keyboards
- Destiny Adia Andrews, Kersha Bailey, Naomi Leanne Parchment – choir
- Steven De Bruyn – blues harp
- C.J. Bolland – synth
- Sebastiaan Van Den Branden – drums, percussion
- Sjoerd Bruil – guitar
- Gwen Cresens – bandoneon
- Sylvie Kreusch – backing vocals
- Mauro Pawlowski – guitar, strings, backing vocals
- Lies Lorquet – backing vocals
