= Paradisiac =

Studio album by Millionaire
- Released: 2005
- Genre: Rock
- Label: Play It Again Sam
- Producer: Josh Homme

Millionaire chronology
Outside the Simian Flock (2001)	Paradisiac (2005)	Sciencing (2017)

Professional ratings
Review scores
Source	Rating
HUMO	(favorable)

Paradisiac is the 2005 album by Belgian rock band Millionaire.

== Track listing ==
All tracks are written by Bas Remans, Tim Vanhamel, David Schroyen and Aldo Struyf, except where noted

No.	Title	Writer(s)	Length
1.	"I'm on A High"	Vanhamel, Pawlowski	4:03
2.	"A Lust Unmatched"		3:34
3.	"For a Maid"		3:27
4.	"Streetlife Cherry"		3:55
5.	"Rise and Fall"		3:33
6.	"Alpha Male"		3:00
7.	"Love Is a Sickness"		3:15
8.	"Ballad of Pure Thought"		3:54
9.	"We Don't Live There Anymore"		4:19
10.	"Wake Up the Children"		3:23
11.	"A Face That Doesn't Fit"		2:25
12.	"Nocturn"		3:05

Notes

- "Nocturn" appears as a hidden track starting at 8:25 into track 11 on the cd.

== Chart positions ==
Country	Peak position
Belgium	9
