= Keep You Close =

Studio album by Deus
- Released: 17 September 2011
- Studio: Motor Music (Mechelen, Belgium); Reanimator and Vantage Point Studio (Antwerp, Belgium)
- Genre: Indie rock
- Length: 43:10
- Label: Universal Music Belgium
- Producer: David Bottrill

Deus chronology
Vantage Point (2008)	Keep You Close (2011)	Following Sea (2012)

Professional ratings
Aggregate scores
Source	Rating
Metacritic	70/100
Review scores
Source	Rating
AllMusic	3/5 stars
Clash	7/10
Drowned in Sound	8/10
goddeau.com	Favourable
HUMO	3/4 stars
Knack	3/4 stars
Q	4/5 stars
Sputnikmusic	5/5 stars

Keep You Close is the sixth studio album by Belgian rock band Deus. It was released in Belgium on 17 September 2011, in mainland Europe on 19 September and in the United Kingdom on 3 October. On its first day of release, the album was certified gold in Belgium for sales of 10,000 copies. It was eventually certified platinum on 7 October 2011, denoting sales in excess of 20,000 copies.

== Track listing ==
All lyrics are written by Tom Barman; all music is composed by Deus.

No.	Title	Length
1.	"Keep You Close"	5:16
2.	"The Final Blast"	4:39
3.	"Dark Sets In"	4:54
4.	"Twice (We Survive)"	4:34
5.	"Ghost"	4:37
6.	"Constant Now"	3:48
7.	"The End of Romance"	4:39
8.	"Second Nature"	4:04
9.	"Easy"	6:40

Belgian iTunes Store bonus track
No.	Title	Length
10.	"Constant Now" (live at Sudoeste, Zambujeira, Portugal)	3:48

== Personnel ==
Credits adapted from the liner notes of Keep You Close.

Deus

- Tom Barman – vocals, guitar, keyboards
- Klaas Janzoons – violin, keyboards, vocals, percussion, string arrangements
- Stéphane Misseghers – drums, percussion, vocals, keyboards
- Mauro Pawlowski – guitar, vocals, keyboards, string arrangements
- Alan Gevaert – bass, vocals, guitar, mandolin

Additional personnel

- Els Becu – marimba, vibraphone (tracks 1, 3)
- Dick Beetham – mastering
- Jon Birdsong – bugle, horns, trumpet (tracks 6, 9)
- C. J. Bolland – additional programming, additional recording
- Esmé Bos – backing vocals (track 1)
- David Bottrill – production
- Stefan Bracaval – extended flutes (track 9)
- Greg Dulli – vocals (tracks 3, 4)
- Olaf Heine – band photography
- Anton Janssens – Rhodes piano (tracks 5, 7)
- Roos Janssens – backing vocals (track 5)
- Trijn Janssens – backing vocals (track 6)
- Sabine Kabongo – backing vocals (track 3)
- Mark Steylaerts Ensemble – strings (tracks 1, 7, 9)
- Adam Noble – co-production, engineering, mixing
- Matthew Oates – cover photography
- Charlotte Timmers – backing vocals (track 6)
- Uber and Kosher – artwork
- Piet Van Bockstal – oboe (track 1)
- Bram Van Houtte – engineering assistance
- Tim Vanhamel – vocals (track 5)

== Charts ==
=== Weekly charts ===
Weekly chart performance for Keep You Close
Chart (2011)	Peak position
Austrian Albums (Ö3 Austria)	56
Belgian Albums (Ultratop Flanders)	1
Belgian Albums (Ultratop Wallonia)	3
Dutch Albums (Album Top 100)	3
French Albums (SNEP)	32
German Albums (Offizielle Top 100)	67
Swiss Albums (Schweizer Hitparade)	38

=== Year-end charts ===
Year-end chart performance for Keep You Close
Chart (2011)	Position
Belgian Albums (Ultratop Flanders)	11
Belgian Albums (Ultratop Wallonia)	91
Dutch Albums (Album Top 100)	82

== Certifications ==
Certifications for Keep You Close
Region	Certification	Certified units/sales
Belgium (BRMA)	Platinum	30,000^{*}
^{*} Sales figures based on certification alone.
