= Guy Van Nueten =

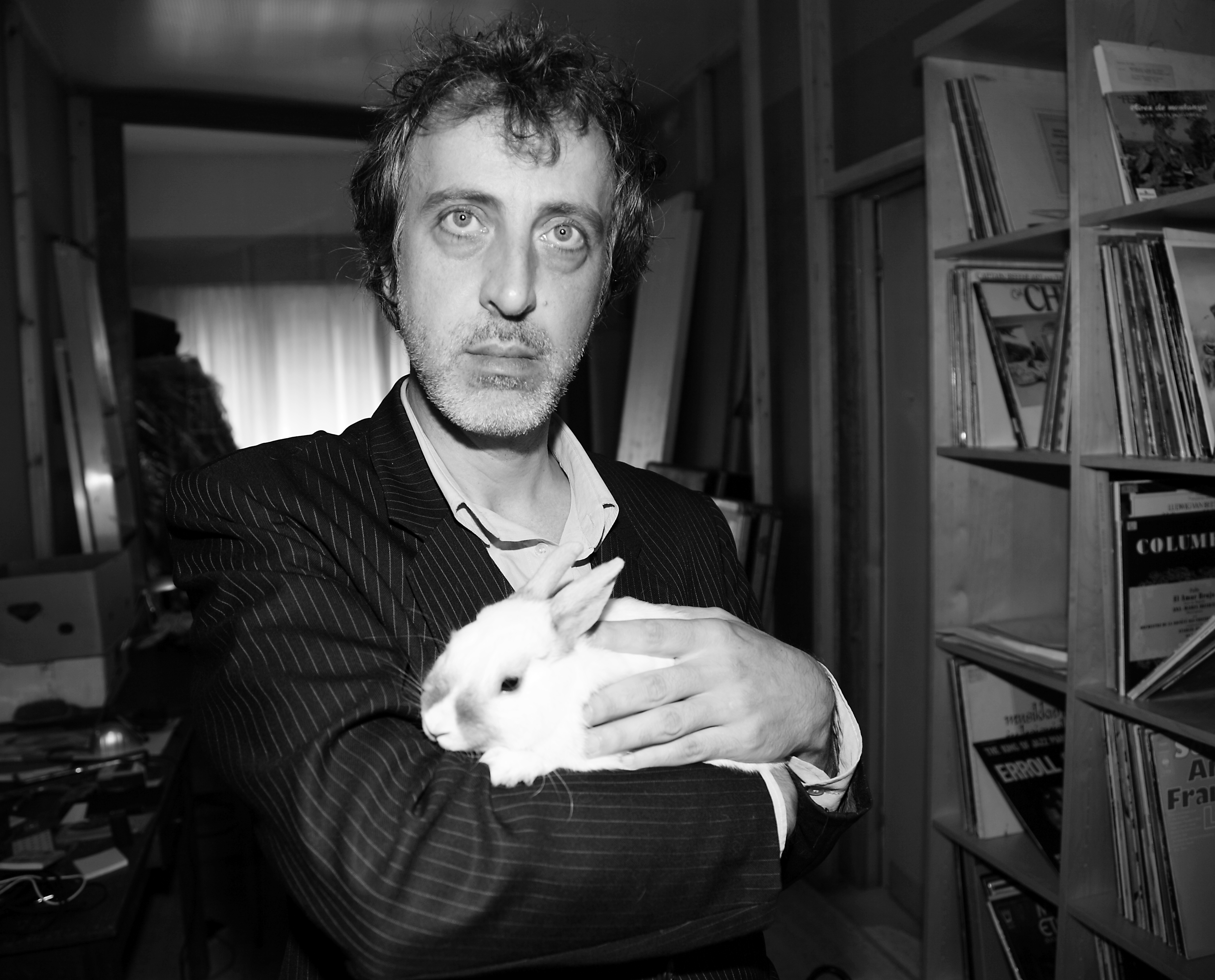
- Guy Van Nueten and Stamper (Antwerp, 2009), by Ann Vallé

Background information
- Born: 25 July 1965 (age 61); Turnhout, Belgium
- Genre: Contemporary classical music
- Occupations: Composer, pianist, record producer
- Instruments: piano, organ, synthesizer
- Years active: 1989–present
- Labels: 62TV Records, Bolli Records, Boom! Records, Lowlands, MCA Records, Megadisc, Sony Classical Records, Télès Music, Universal Records
- Website: http://www.guyvannueten.com/

Guy Van Nueten (born 25 July 1965 in Turnhout, Belgium) is a Belgian composer, pianist and record producer.

== Life and career ==
Van Nueten began playing the piano at the age of four when his mother enrolled him in the local music school. He learned to read music before learning to read words. In his teenage years, he developed an interest in pop and rock music, and after completing his studies in mathematical economics, he fully committed to a career in music.

In the early years of his career, Van Nueten was a member of the band The Sands, whose self-titled debut album was produced by Bill Janovitz of the American band Buffalo Tom and released worldwide by Universal Records. The band toured Europe, including performances with John Cale. In 1990, Van Nueten wrote The Sands' notable track "April and June", which became a staple on Belgian radio and frequently appeared on "Top 100 Belgian Songs of All Time" lists.

In 1998, Van Nueten decided to shift his musical focus and enrolled at a conservatory to study composition and harmony. Under the guidance of internationally renowned pedagogue Jacques De Tiège, he refined his piano skills.

Van Nueten has composed music for film directors, theater productions and choreographers. His compositions have been featured in productions by prominent Benelux theaters, including Toneelhuis, Toneelgroep Amsterdam, Les Ballets C de la B, and HETPALEIS. In 2005, he composed the musical Soepkinders. He has also composed for films by directors such as Koen Mortier (Ex Drummer) and Alex Stockman (Eva, Pulsar).

The music magazine OOR described his work for Les Ballets C de la B's dance production Bâche as a masterpiece, noting the unique combination of modern electronic soundscapes with emotive Elizabethan music.

In 2016, Van Nueten was recognized as a Fellow at the Sundance Institute for his work on the dance performance Verveling (Boredom), a collaboration with dancer Sheila Rojas and choreographer Amar Al-Bojrad. This fellowship is part of the institute's international cultural exchange programs to support independent artists from the Middle East and North Africa.

As a performer and arranger, Van Nueten has contributed to albums by artists such as dEUS, Admiral Freebee, Zita Swoon, Magnus, Tim Vanhamel and DAAN. Two of his songs have been included in the "Top 100 Belgian Songs of All Time" by the Belgian magazine Knack. His collaboration with Tom Barman, the double album Live, featured piano arrangements and was released across Europe, appearing on several best-of-the-year lists in 2003.

In 2009, Van Nueten released Merg, a contemporary classical solo album with influences from Baroque music and composers like Johann Sebastian Bach. In 2013, he followed up with Pacman, which was described by VRT Canvas' cobra.be as "timeless and free from trends". The Pacman trilogy concluded in 2018 with the release of Contact, marking Van Nueten as the first Belgian solo artist to release an album on Sony Classical. In Humo, Tom Lanoye praised it as the most captivating album of the COVID-19 pandemic year, 2020.

In autumn 2019, Van Nueten released the EP Night Has Come, featuring music from the soundtrack of Peter Van Goethem's film Night Has Come. The following years saw the release of the EPs As Played By, Wired, and Pulsar, which are part of Decent Music, a collection of works composed by Van Nueten between 2002 and 2022 for theater, film and dance.

== Music ==
=== Theater, musical, dance ===
- Het Beest, FroeFroe/HETPALEIS, director: Marc Maillard (2000)
- Beautiful Red Dress, Podium Modern, director: Manou Kersting (2001)
- Winter onder de tafel, HETPALEIS, director: Peter de Graef (2002–2004)
- Van muizen en mensen, Laika/Blauw4, director: Jo Roets (2003–2005)
- Villa Fink van Laika/De Blauwe Engel, director: Noël Fisher (2003)
- Percursos/Hotel Tomilho, Laika, concept: Peter De Bie, director: Jo Roets (2004, 2005, 2007)
- Soepkinders (musical), Laika/HETPALEIS, text: Gerda Dendooven, director: Jo Roets (2005–2008)
- Bâche, Les Ballets C de la B, choreography: Koen Augustijnen (2004–2006)
- Merg, De Roovers, text: Judith Herzberg, director: de Roovers (2006)
- Import-Export, Les Ballets C de la B, choreography: Koen Augustijnen (2006–2008)
- Runway show Dries Van Noten (with dEUS), men's collection, Milan (2007)
- Maria Magdalena, Toneelhuis (Antwerpen), director: Wayn Traub (2008)
- De 7 hoofdzonden, Cellopalladio, artistic coordination: Katelijn Van Kerckhoven (2009)
- 't Takkenkind (musical), Laika, text: Gerda Dendooven, director: Jo Roets (2009–2010, 2013–2014)
- Moederland (musical), Theater Stap, director: Lies Van Assche (2010–2011)
- Verveling/Boredom (dance), Moussem, director: Amar Al Bojrad (2012, 2016)
- WDSASE (dance), Monty, choreography: Duraid Al Abbas (2013)
- Solitary Confinement (eenzame opsluiting), Moussem, director: Strange Fruit (Amar Al Bojrad, Duraid Abbas and Sarah Eisa) (2013)
- The Medium (musical), Walpurgis, director: Judith Vindevogel (2015)
- Skin, Compagnie Malka (FRA), choreography: Bouba Landrille Tchouda (2015–2016)
- Verveling (Boredom), WPZimmer/Sundance Institute (USA)/KunstZ (2016, 2017)
- Runway show Dries Van Noten and Christian Lacroix, women's collection SS20, Opéra Bastille, Paris (2019)
- De Toverberg, Internationaal Theater Amsterdam (NL), director: Stef Aerts and Marie Vinck - FC Bergman (2022)

=== Film music ===
- Pâques au Tison (with Jef Mercelis), La Parti Production, director: Martine Doyen (2002)
- Wolf, SKaGeN, director: SKaGeN (2003)
- Jaguar (short film), director: Willem Thijssen (2003)
- De Balletten en ci en là (documentary), director: Alain Platel (2006)
- Eva reste au placard... (short film), director: Alex Stockman (2006) ('Best European Short' Évora International Short Film Festival, Portugal 2007)
- Ex Drummer (with amongst others Arno and Flip Kowlier), CCCP, director: Koen Mortier (2006) ('Tiger Award' International Film Festival Rotterdam 2007; 'Best First Feature' Fantasia festival 2008; 'Best Debut Feature' Raindance Film Festival 2007; 'Special Jury Award' Warsaw Film Festival 2007)
- 'Corporate' and 'Photo', Caviar, director: Kurt Maes (2007) ('Best Film Producer' Corporate Video Festival, Antwerp 2008)
- Everybody Sings the Blues (short film), director: Marc Goyens (2007)
- First Things First (short film), director: Arne Focketyn (2010)
- Pulsar, Corridor Films, director: Alex Stockman (2009–2010) ('Preis der Deutsche Filmkritik' Filmfest Hamburg 2011)
- Epilogue (documentary), Serendipity Films, director: Manno Lanssens (2011) ('Best Documentary' Ensor Award 2012)
- Nuru (animation), Walking the Dog, director: Michaël Palmaers (2011) ('Best Animated Short' Palm Springs Film Festival; 'Best animated short' Rhode Island Film Festival)
- Milo, Samson Films (IRL) & Fu Works (NL), director: Berend and Roel Boorsma (2011–2012) ('CGS Award' Giffoni Film Festival; 'Best International Children's Movie 2012' Cinekid Festival)
- Artaud, le surréel et les Tarahumaras, Blauer Reiter Filmproduktion (GER), director: Lara Quaglia (2013)
- Brussels: A City Caught on Film (music for silent movies), CINEMATEK (2014)
- Le choix de peindre - Van Gogh (with Alan Gevaert) (documentary), Alizé/RTBF/Arte, director: Henri de Gerlache (2014)
- Raoul Servais, mémoires d'un artisan (documentary), LesFilmsDuCarré, director: Bastien Martin (2017)
- Night Has Come, Inti Films, director: Peter Van Goethem (2019)

=== Discography ===
The Sands:

- The Sands (Universal, 1995)
- ...And Other True Stories (Universal, 1996)

Tom Barman & Guy Van Nueten:

- Live (Universal, 2003)

Van Nueten & Dugardin:

- Bâche (Bolli Records/Lowlands, 2004)

Guy Van Nueten:

- Merg (Bolli Records/62TV/PIAS, 2009)
- Pacman (Bolli Records, 2013)
- Music for a Small Orchestra (soundtrack Milo) (Bolli Records, 2015)
- Contact (Sony Classical, 2018)
- Night Has Come (soundtrack, ep) (Bolli Records, 2019)
- As Played By (ep) (Bolli Records, 2020)
- Wired (ep) (Bolli Records, 2020)
- Pulsar (soundtrack) (Bolli Records, 2021)
- Decent Music (Télès Music, 2024)
- Pacman Imaginations (ep) (Télès Music, 2026)
