= Outside the Simian Flock =

Studio album by Millionaire
- Released: September 28, 2001
- Recorded: October 2000 at Dada Studio, Brussels
- Genre: Rock
- Length: 52:01
- Label: Play It Again Sam
- Producer: Zmago 'Zed' Smon, Tim Vanhamel

Millionaire chronology
Outside the Simian Flock (2001)	Paradisiac (2005)

Professional ratings
Review scores
Source	Rating
Allmusic	4/5 stars
HUMO	(favorable)

Outside the Simian Flock is the 2001 debut album by Belgian rock band Millionaire. It was released in Belgium by Play It Again Sam.

== Track listing ==
All tracks are written by Tim Vanhamel.

No.	Title	Length
1.	"Body Experience Revue"	6:05
2.	"Aping Friends"	3:20
3.	"Me Crazy, You Sane"	4:21
4.	"Champagne"	4:45
5.	"Blindfold"	5:28
6.	"Come with You"	4:29
7.	"She's a Doll"	3:01
8.	"Petty Thug"	5:16
9.	"Her Gender (Fixed)"	5:04
10.	"Flame Me Up"	2:40
11.	"Nothing Left"	3:27
12.	"Summer Pass Me By"	4:05

== Charts ==
Chart	Peak position
Belgium	50
