= My Sister = My Clock =

My Sister Is My Clock

EP by Deus
- Released: April 1995
- Genre: Experimental rock
- Length: 25:42
- Label: Bang!, Island
- Producer: Deus

Deus chronology
Worst Case Scenario (1994)	My Sister Is My Clock (1995)	In a Bar, Under the Sea (1996)

Professional ratings
Review scores
Source	Rating
Allmusic	link

My Sister Is My Clock is an EP released by the Belgian band Deus in 1995 with the songs that did not make the 1994 LP Worst Case Scenario. It was recorded and mixed at Caraibes in Brussels in August 1994, and edited at the Pingstudio in Ghent. It was produced by the duo Vermeersch/Vervloesem, who also played guitar, piano, bass, and drums on some of the songs.

On the CD all the music is in a single track lasting over 25 minutes.

== Track listing ==
1. "Middlewave" (Stef Kamil Carlens) [2:05]
2. "Almost White" (Rudy Trouvé) [1:11]
3. "Healthinsurance" (Tom Barman) [00:59]
4. "Little Ghost" (Stef Kamil Carlens) [1:28]
5. "How to Row a Cat" (Klaas Janzoons) [1:34]
6. "Only a Colour to Her" (Tom Barman, Stef Kamil Carlens, Craig Ward) [4:15]
7. "Sweetness " (Klaas Janzoons, Peter Vermeersch, Pierre Vervloesem, Rudy Trouvé) [1:04]
8. "Sick Sugar" (Rudy Trouvé) [1:08]
9. "The Horror Partyjokes" (Tom Barman, Stef Kamil Carlens) [4:55]
10. "Void" (Rudy Trouvé) [1:12]
11. "San Titre Pour Sira" (Klaas Janzoons) [1:20]
12. "Glovesong" (Tom Barman) [3:58]
13. "Lore in the Forest" (Tom Barman, Stef Kamil Carlens, Rudy Trouvé, Klaas Janzoons, Jules De Borgher) [00:25]

== Personnel ==
- Jules De Borgher – Drums
- Klaas Janzoons – Violin, Piano, Percussion, Delay
- Rudy Trouvé – Guitar, Voice, Piano, Synth, Rhythm-Box, Bass, Toy-Horns, Mattress, Teeth, Harp
- Stef Kamil Carlens – Electric & Acoustic guitar, Voice, Bass, Piano, Bells, Pipes
- Tom Barman – Electric & Acoustic guitar, Piano, Voice, Dialogue
