= Ex Drummer =

2007 Belgian film

- Film poster
- Directed by: Koen Mortier
- Written by: Herman Brusselmans; Koen Mortier
- Produced by: Koen Mortier; Eurydice Gysel
- Starring: Dries Van Hegen; Norman Baert
- Cinematography: Glynn Speeckaert
- Edited by: Manu Van Hove
- Music by: Arno Hintjens; Flip Kowlier; Millionaire; Guy Van Nueten
- Distributed by: CCCP (Belgium)
- Release date: 7 November 2007
- Running time: 90 minutes
- Country: Belgium
- Language: Dutch

Ex Drummer is a 2007 Belgian black comedy rock music film directed and co-written by Koen Mortier, whose previous work was limited to television commercials. It is based on the 1994 book by Herman Brusselmans of the same name. While receiving mixed reviews at the time, it went on to become a cult film.

== Plot ==
Screenshot from Ex Drummer, showing Norman Baert as Koen de Geyter, the lead singer of the band.

In Ostend, West Flanders, three physically disabled musicians are looking for a drummer for their punk rock band. Wanting to perform only one time at a music competition, they approach famous writer Dries to be their drummer, the idea being that he also has a "handicap" in that he cannot actually play the drums. Their small setlist includes a cover of Devo's song "Mongoloid". For Dries, this is an opportunity to get some inspiration for a new novel, so he accepts the offer. The band members decide to call the band The Feminists, since they think four "handicapped" musicians are just as worthless as a group of feminists. Their main opponents are the band Harry Mulisch (an allusion to Harry Mulisch), also led by a writer, nicknamed Dikke Lul ("Fat Cock"). As the story goes on, Dries becomes more and more obsessed by his new novel and he tries to manipulate the band members and tries to find their weak spot.

== Cast ==
- Dries Vanhegen: Dries
- Norman Baert: Koen de Geyter
- Sam Louwyck: Ivan Van Dorpe
- Gunter Lamoot: Jan Verbeek
- Tristan Versteven: Dorian
- Wim Willaert: Jimmy
- Dolores Bouckaert: Lio
- Barbara Callewaert: Christine
- François Beukelaers: Pa Verbeek
- Bernadette Damman: Ma Verbeek
- Jan Hammenecker: Dikke Lul

== Soundtrack ==
The music of The Feminists was in fact performed by Belgian band Millionaire and the Harry Mulisch song was sung by Belgian singer Flip Kowlier.

1. Lightning Bolt – "2 Morro Morro Land"
2. Madensuyu – "Papa Bear"
3. An Pierlé & White Velvet – "Need You Now"
4. The Tritones – "Chagrin De La Mer"
5. Mogwai – "Hunted by a Freak"
6. The Experimental Tropic Blues Band – "Mexico Dream Blues"
7. Flip Kowlier – "De Grotste Lul Van 't Stad"
8. Millionaire – "Mongoloid"
9. Isis – "In Fiction"
10. Isis – "Grinning Mouths"
11. Arno Hintjens – "Een Boeket Met Pissebloemen"
12. Augusta National Golf Club – "People in Pairs"
13. Mel Dune – "Time Hangs Heavy on Your Hands"
14. Ghinzu – "Blow"
15. Funeral Dress – "Hello from the Underground"
16. Millionaire – "Deep Fish"
17. Blutch – "Moving Ground"

== Reception ==
On the review aggregator website Rotten Tomatoes, 44% of 18 critics' reviews are positive, with an average rating of 4.8/10. Metacritic, which uses a weighted average, assigned the film a score of 36 out of 100, based on four critics, indicating "generally unfavorable" reviews. In Belgium, it caused some controversy due to the violence and explicit sex in the film.

=== Awards ===
- Fant-Asia Film Festival
  - won Jury Prize Best First Feature-Koen Mortier
- Raindance Film Festival
  - won Jury Prize Debut Feature-Koen Mortier
- Warsaw International Film Festival
  - won Special Jury Award-Koen Mortier
- Rotterdam International Film Festival
  - won Tiger Award-Koen Mortier
