= Pulsar (film) =

- Film poster
- Directed by: Alex Stockman
- Screenplay by: Alex Stockman
- Produced by: Alex Stockman; Kaat Camerlynck
- Starring: Matthias Schoenaerts
- Cinematography: Sébastien Koeppel
- Edited by: Nico Leunen
- Music by: Guy Van Nueten
- Production company: Corridor
- Distributed by: Imagine Film Distribution
- Release date: August 2010 (Locarno)
- Running time: 91 minutes
- Country: Belgium
- Languages: Dutch; French; English

Pulsar is a 2010 Belgian techno-thriller film directed by Alex Stockman and starring Matthias Schoenaerts.

== Plot ==
Samuel works in Brussels as a pharmaceutical delivery man. His girlfriend, Mireille, moves to New York to intern at a prestigious architecture firm. After her departure, Sam's computer is hacked. The mysterious hacker seems intent on messing up Samuel's life and his relationship with Mireille. Sam starts to suspect his neighbors and gets obsessed with Wi-Fi rays.

== Cast ==
- Matthias Schoenaerts as Samuel Verbist
- Tine Van den Wyngaert as Mireille Leduc
- Andrea Bardos as Schoonmaakster
- Leah Chanmugam as Buurmeisje
- Liesje De Backer as Liesbet
- Jessica De Baere as Ellen
- Josse De Pauw as Vader
