= Trap (album) =

Studio album by Dead Man Ray
- Released: 2000
- Genre: Experimental rock
- Label: Labels - Virgin - HeavenHotel
- Producer: Dead Man Ray

Dead Man Ray chronology
Berchem (1998)	Trap (2000)	Marginal (2001)

Professional ratings
Review scores
Source	Rating
Allmusic	4/5 stars

Trap is the second studio album of the Belgian rock band Dead Man Ray. It was released in 2000.

== Tracks ==
1. Woods (4:36)
2. Weckpot (1:31)
3. Toothpaste (4:09)
4. Brenner (6:02)
5. Jahwe (1:56)
6. Dover (1:14)
7. Ham (3:26)
8. Nezt (5:44)
9. Slow Indian (4:01)
10. Tunnels (4:57)
11. Warehouse (0:51)
12. Théque (3:23)
13. Niecht (2:13)
14. Tham (2:07)
15. Preset (6:26)
