= Vantage Point (Deus album) =

Studio album by Deus
- Released: 18 April 2008
- Genre: Indie rock
- Length: 46:35
- Label: V2; Cooperative Music
- Producer: Dave McCracken

Deus chronology
Pocket Revolution (2005)	Vantage Point (2008)	Keep You Close (2011)

Professional ratings
Review scores
Source	Rating
AllMusic	3.5/5 stars
Drowned in Sound	8/10
HUMO	4/4 stars
Knack	3/4 stars
Mojo	3/5 stars
Q	3/5 stars

Vantage Point is the fifth studio album by Belgian rock band Deus, released in Europe on 18 April 2008, in the United Kingdom and Ireland on 21 April, and in Japan on 21 May. This is the first Deus album which features the same line-up as the previous album. This album was also the first to be recorded at their own built studio in Borgerhout, near Antwerp.

Within its first week of release, Vantage Point was certified Gold by the Belgian Entertainment Association (BEA), before reaching Platinum status the following month.

== Track listing ==
No.	Title	Writer(s)	Length
1.	"When She Comes Down"	Tom Barman; Mauro Pawlowski; Klaas Janzoons; Alan Gevaert; Stéphane Misseghers	5:05
2.	"Oh Your God"	Barman; Pawlowski; Janzoons; Gevaert; Misseghers	3:51
3.	"Eternal Woman" (with Lies Lorquet of Mintzkov)	Barman; Pawlowski	4:22
4.	"Favourite Game"	Barman	4:11
5.	"Slow" (with Karin Dreijer Andersson of The Knife)	Barman; Pawlowski; Janzoons; Gevaert; Misseghers	6:08
6.	"The Architect"	Barman; Pawlowski; Janzoons; Gevaert; Misseghers	3:56
7.	"Is a Robot"	Barman; Pawlowski	4:57
8.	"Smokers Reflect"	Barman	4:26
9.	"The Vanishing of Maria Schneider" (with Guy Garvey of Elbow)	Barman	4:43
10.	"Popular Culture"	Barman; Pawlowski	4:56
Total length:			46:35

== Personnel ==
- Strings arranged by Klaas Janzoons
- Artwork by Michaël Borremans
- Artwork design by Rob Crane
- Lyrics by Tom Barman
- Mastered by Howie Weinberg
- Mixed by, engineer - Joe Hirst
- Music by Mauro Pawlowski (tracks: 3, 7), Barman (tracks: 3, 4, 7 to 10), Deus (tracks: 1, 2, 5, 6)
- Producer, mixed by Dave McCracken
- Recorded (additional recording), programmed by CJ Bolland, Catherine Marks, Euan Dickinson

== Charts ==
=== Weekly charts ===
Weekly chart performance for Vantage Point
Chart (2008)	Peak position
Austrian Albums (Ö3 Austria)	57
Belgian Albums (Ultratop Flanders)	1
Belgian Albums (Ultratop Wallonia)	3
Dutch Albums (Album Top 100)	7
French Albums (SNEP)	40
German Albums (Offizielle Top 100)	65
Italian Albums (FIMI)	78
Swiss Albums (Schweizer Hitparade)	57

=== Year-end charts ===
Year-end chart performance for Vantage Point
Chart (2008)	Position
Belgian Albums (Ultratop Flanders)	5
Belgian Albums (Ultratop Wallonia)	73

== Certifications ==
Certifications for Keep You Close
Region	Certification	Certified units/sales
Belgium (BRMA)	Platinum	30,000^{*}
^{*} Sales figures based on certification alone.

== Singles ==
Year	Title	BE	Notes
2008	"The Architect"	2	Belgium only, February, 2008
2008	"Slow"	43	February, 2008
2008	"Eternal Woman"	38	May, 2008
2008	"When She Comes Down"	49	May, 2008
