= A Song About a Girls =

A Song about a Girls

Studio album by Zita Swoon
- Released: Fall 2004
- Genre: Indie rock
- Length: 49:44
- Label: Chikaree Records
- Producer: Stef Kamil Carlens

Zita Swoon chronology
Life = A Sexy Sanctuary (2001)	A Song about a Girls (2004)	Big City (2007)

A Song about a Girls is a studio album by the Belgian indie rock band Zita Swoon. It was released in the fall of 2004. The album reached #4 in the Flemish Ultratop chart.

== Background ==
A Song about a Girls is the most introspective and melancholic work of Zita Swoon so far. Violins make an important contribution to the calmer sound of the album. Singer and songwriter Stef Kamil Carlens explains how they came to this new sound: "I had written some really loud songs, but we were searching in vain to get the sound right. Then at some time Tom did a little loop on his laptop, Kobe and Aarich started to do some percussion and suddenly it sounded good. We tried to get the other songs in the same atmosphere, and were pleasantly surprised with the result."

A Song about a Girls contains songs in both English and French. It was the first time Zita Swoon recorded songs in French. One of these French songs, "De Quoi a Besoin l'Amour", is a duet with the Belgian singer Axelle Red.

The songs "Me & Josie on a Saturday Night" and "Josiesomething" are about a girl named Josie, who was also present in previous Zita Swoon albums. It's not a real person, but a character Stef Kamil Carlens draws in his mind. "The character is built, little by little, by different experiences I have," Carlens explains.

== Track listing ==
1. "Me & Josie on a Saturday Night" (Stef Kamil Carlens, Tom Pintens, Bjorn Eriksson) – 3:55
2. "Intrigue" (Carlens) – 3:57
3. "Hey You, Whatshadoing" (Carlens) – 4:13
4. "Selfish Girl" (Carlens) – 3:49
5. "De Quoi a Besoin l'Amour?" (Carlens) – 4:55
6. "Sad Water" (Carlens) – 6:04
7. "Clair Obscure" (Carlens) – 3:13
8. "Josiesomething" (Carlens) – 4:37
9. "Thinking About You all the Time" (Carlens) – 4:19
10. "100" (Carlens) – 2:36
11. "Individu Animal" (Carlens, Pintens) – 3:37
12. "Remember to Withhold" (Carlens) – 4:29

== Chart performance ==
=== Weekly charts ===
Chart (2004)	Peak position
Belgian Albums (Ultratop Flanders)	4
Belgian Albums (Ultratop Wallonia)	35
Dutch Albums (Album Top 100)	65

=== Year-end charts ===
Chart (2004)	Position
Belgian Albums (Ultratop Flanders)	43
Chart (2005)	Position
Belgian Albums (Ultratop Flanders)	97
