= Any Way the Wind Blows (film) =

2003 film

- Film poster
- Directed by: Tom Barman
- Written by: Tom Barman
- Produced by: Kaat Camerlynck; Christian Pierre; Alex Stockman
- Starring: Frank Vercruyssen; Diane De Belder; Eric Kloeck
- Music by: Magnus; Tom Barman
- Distributed by: Cinéart
- Release dates: May 2003 (Cannes); 18 June 2003 (Belgium)
- Running time: 125 minutes
- Country: Belgium
- Languages: Dutch; French; English

Any Way the Wind Blows is a 2003 Belgian film directed by Tom Barman, the lead singer of the Belgian rockband dEUS. The film is set in Antwerp and follows the lives of several characters intertwining with each other. Thanks to its rock music, jazz, pop and electronica music soundtrack, the film has become a cult film. The theme song Summer's Here by Magnus was a hit at the time.

== Premise ==
Set in Antwerp on a sunny Friday in the beginning of June, eight people dream of having a different life. There is wind and music, police and paranoia, gossip, fighting and in the evening, a party.

== Cast ==
- Frank Vercruyssen as Walter
- Diane De Belder as Lara
- Eric Kloeck as Paul Garcin
- Natali Broods as Natalie
- Matthias Schoenaerts as Chouki
- Dirk Roofthooft as Firmin
- Jonas Boel as Frederique
- Titus De Voogdt as Felix
- Sam Louwyck as Windman
- Annick Christiaens as Elsie
- Cedric Faes as Charlie
- Ides Meire as Thomas
- Louise Fimmers as Julie
- Katelijne Damen as Grandmother
- Diane Meersman as Jessie
- Johan Heldenbergh as Schoesetters

== Soundtrack ==
1. Magnus – "Summer's Here"
2. Charles Mingus – "Mysterious Blues"
3. Squarepusher – "My Red Hot Car"
4. Toy – "Suspicion"
5. Oliver Nelson – "Elegy For A Duck"
6. Max Berlin – "Elle Et Moi"
7. Charlie Parker – "In the Still of the Night"
8. Young MC – "Got More Rhymes"
9. The Kids – "There Will Be No Next Time"
10. Yazoo – "Situation"
11. Tiefschwarz – "Acid Soule"
12. Magnus – "Rhythm Is Deified"
13. Ils – "Next Level / 6 Space"
14. J.J. Cale – "Magnolia"
15. Evil Superstars – "Holy Spirit Come Home"
16. Stade – "Anatonal"
17. Aphrodite – "Lava Flows"
18. Roots Manuva – "Witness One Hope"
19. Herbie Hancock – "Curiosity"
