= Magnus (band) =

Belgian dance music project

Magnus was a Belgian joint dance music project comprising Tom Barman (from the rock band dEUS) and CJ Bolland. Magnus' debut album, The Body Gave You Everything, was released on 29 March 2004. Four of its tracks were released as singles: "Summer's Here", "Jumpneedle", "French Movies" and "Hunter/Collector".

"Summer's Here" (which uses a sample of Donald Byrd's song "Christo Redentor") and "Rhythm Is Deified" also appeared on the soundtrack of Barman's 2003 film Any Way the Wind Blows. In the years following their debut album, Tom Barman and CJ Bolland performed together as DJs on several festivals.

After a long hiatus, the band released a second album in 2014 titled Where Neon Goes to Die. It was preceded by the single "Singing Man", with vocals by Tom Smith, leader of Editors. Other guest vocalists on the album included David Eugene Edwards, Selah Sue, Mina Tindle, Tim Vanhamel, Billie Kawende and Portuguese female rap artist Blaya. Briefly after the release of the album, an alternate version of "Singing Man" was recorded with Mark Lanegan.

In December 2014, Magnus released "Slecht Gaan", a collaboration with Dutch rap act De Jeugd Van Tegenwoordig which was not featured on Where Neon Goes to Die.

== Albums ==
Album	Label	Year
The Body Gave You Everything	Bulbus	2004
Where Neon Goes to Die	Caroline Distribution, Universal Music Belgium, Bulbus	2014
Best of Magnus	Universal Music Belgium	2017

== Singles and EPs ==
Single / EP	Label	Year
"Summer's Here" (CD, 12")	Universal Music Belgium	2003–2004
"Jumpneedle" (CD, single)	Universal Music Belgium	2004
Hunter/Collector E.P. (CD, EP)	Universal, Island	2004
Magnus / Ultrasonic7 – Radar Remixes 02 (12")	Radar Records	2011
"Singing Man" / "Puppy" (7")	Universal Music Belgium	2014
"Slecht Gaan" (with De Jeugd Van Tegenwoordig) (digital)	Bulbus	2014
"Remix EP" (digital)	Universal Music Belgium	2015
"Look at Us Now" (CD, digital)	Universal Music Belgium	2017
