= Berchem (album) =

Studio album by Dead Man Ray
- Released: 1998
- Genre: Experimental rock
- Length: 61:28
- Label: Heavenhotel
- Producer: Dead Man Ray

Dead Man Ray chronology
Berchem (1998)	Trap (2000)

Berchem is the debut album of the Belgian rock band Dead Man Ray, released in 1998. The album is named after Berchem, a district of the city of Antwerp, where the band originates.

== Track listing ==
All tracks are written by Dead Man Ray.

Berchem track listing
No.	Title	Length
1.	"Beegee"	5:00
2.	"Inc."	2:42
3.	"Stain"	3:10
4.	"Bones"	3:03
5.	"6-Pack"	3:43
6.	"Bread"	4:00
7.	"Moïd"	5:06
8.	"Perfo"	4:06
9.	"Chemical"	4:23
10.	"Horse"	3:33
11.	"WW3"	1:59
12.	"Copy of 78, Part 1"	3:15
13.	"Copy of 78, Part 2"	8:28
14.	"Copy of 78, Part 3"	1:04
15.	"Stool"	2:40
16.	"Babydoll"	5:15
Total length:		61:28
