= The Ideal Crash =

Studio album by dEUS
- Released: 16 March 1999
- Recorded: 1998–1999
- Genre: Art rock, indie rock
- Length: 56:14
- Label: Island
- Producer: David Bottrill

DEUS chronology
In a Bar, Under the Sea (1996)	The Ideal Crash (1999)	Pocket Revolution (2005)

Singles from The Ideal Crash
- 1. "Instant Street" Released: February 1999; 2. "Sister Dew" Released: May 1999; 3. "The Ideal Crash" Released: October 1999

Professional ratings
Review scores
Source	Rating
AllMusic	4.5/5 stars
The Guardian	4/5 stars
NME	8/10

The Ideal Crash is the third studio album by Belgian rock band dEUS, released in March 1999. The album was recorded in Spain, U.K. and Belgium and was mixed at Olympic Studios and includes the single "Instant Street", which became an underground hit in Europe. It was produced and mixed by David Bottrill.

The Ideal Crash was the first dEUS album to be directly released through a major label (Island Records) but it is also the only dEUS album that did not get a US release. The album cover art is the first dEUS CD cover that does not feature a painting by ex-guitar player Rudy Trouvé.

== Commercial performance ==
The Ideal Crash was issued to immediate success in Belgium, obtaining a gold certification for sales of 25,000 copies after one week of release. By April 2008, The Ideal Crash had sold about 250,000 copies.

The singles "Instant Street" and "Sister Dew" entered the UK Singles Chart, peaking at numbers 49 and 62 respectively.

== Track listing ==
No.	Title	Writer(s)	Length
1.	"Put the Freaks Up Front"	dEUS	5:14
2.	"Sister Dew"	Tom Barman; Craig Ward	5:35
3.	"One Advice, Space"	Barman; Kelvin Smits; Ward	5:46
4.	"The Magic Hour"	Barman; Ward	5:23
5.	"The Ideal Crash"	Barman	5:00
6.	"Instant Street"	Barman; Ward; Mommens	6:15
7.	"Magdalena"	Barman; Ward; Mommens	4:58
8.	"Everybody's Weird"	Barman; Ward	4:51
9.	"Let's See Who Goes Down First"	Klaas Janzoons; Ward; Barman; Mommens	6:23
10.	"Dream Sequence #1"	Barman; Ward	6:31
Total length:			56:14

== Personnel ==
=== dEUS ===
- Tom Barman: vocal, guitar, keyboards, synthesiser, etc.
- Jules de Borgher: drums, percussion, etc.
- Klaas Janzoons: piano, violin, synthesiser, vocal, etc.
- Danny Mommens: bass guitar, etc.
- Craig Ward: guitar, vocal, etc.

=== guest musicians ===
- Bart Maris: horns (1, 8)
- Pol Mareen: horns (1, 8)
- Mark Demaseneer: horns (1, 8)
- Els Dedonker: horns (1)
- Piet Jorens: percussion (2, 6, 9)
- Browndog (Lucy Wilkins, Rebecca Doe, Robert Spriggs, Oli Kraus): strings (2, 4, 10)
- David Bottrill: piano (3)
- Kelvin Smits: keyboards (3)
- Guy Van Nueten: synthesizers (8)
- Sandra Pardo: vocal (8)

String arrangements by Klaas Janzoons

Horn arrangement on (1) by Craig Ward/Tom Barman/Klaas Janzoons

Horn arrangement on (8) by Craig Ward/David Bottrill/Ben Findlay

== Certifications ==
Region	Certification	Certified units/sales
Belgium (BRMA)	Gold	25,000^{*}
^{*} Sales figures based on certification alone.
