= Deus (band) =

Belgian rock group

dEUS
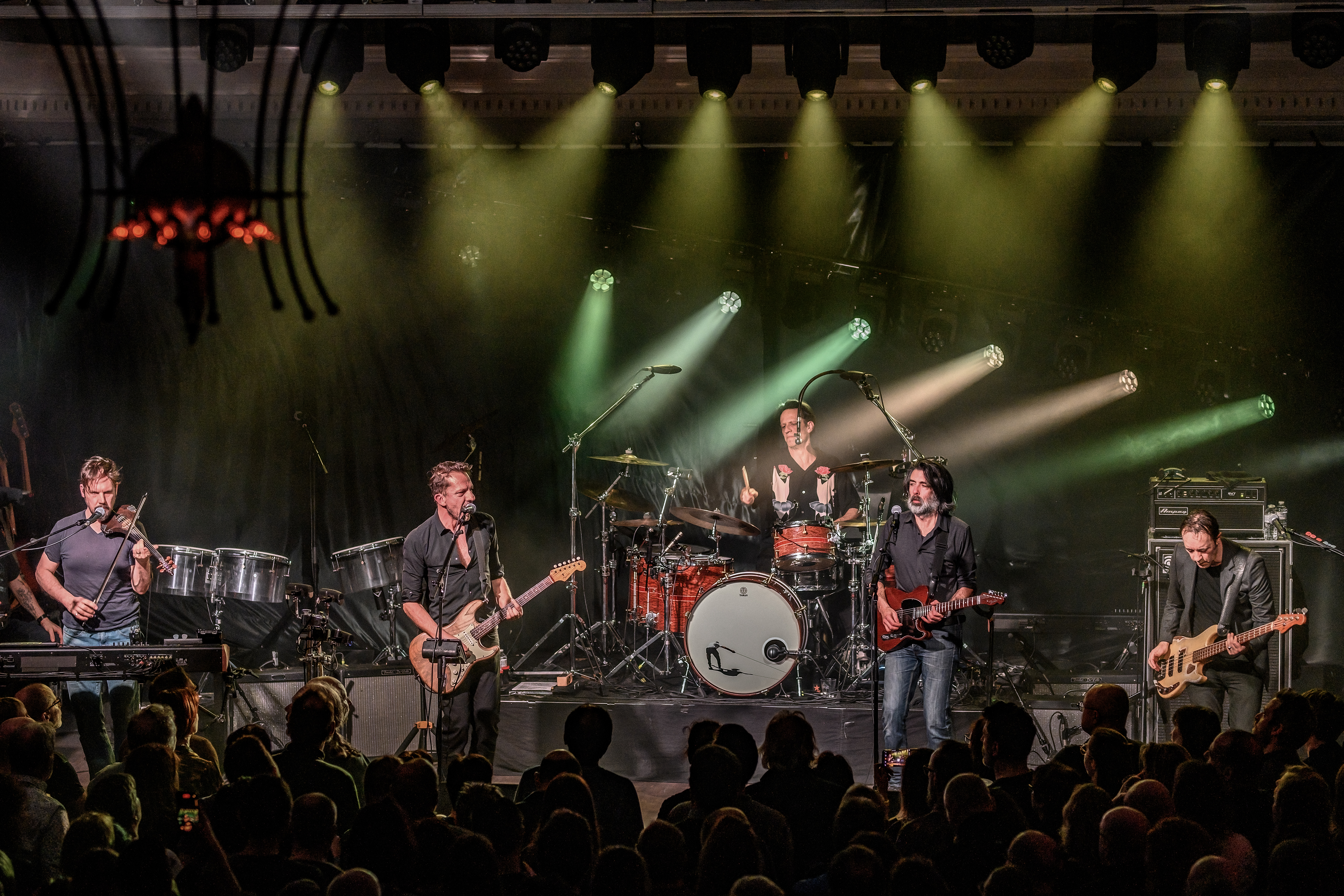
- dEUS in 2023. From left: Klaas Janzoons, Tom Barman, Stéphane Misseghers, Mauro Pawlowski, Alan Gevaert

Background information
- Origin: Antwerp, Belgium
- Genres: Experimental rock, indie rock, alternative rock, art rock
- Works: dEUS discography
- Years active: 1991–present
- Labels: V2; Universal; PIAS
- Members: Tom Barman; Klaas Janzoons; Stéphane Misseghers; Alan Gevaert; Simen Folstad Nilsen
- Past members: Stef Kamil Carlens; Rudy Trouvé; Jules de Borgher; Danny Mommens; Craig Ward; Mauro Pawlowski; Tim Vanhamel; Bruno De Groote; Tijs Delbeke
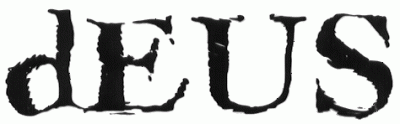
- Website: deusmusic.be

Deus (styled as dEUS) is a rock band based in Antwerp, Belgium, whose only continuous members up to the present day are Tom Barman (vocals, guitars) and Klaas Janzoons (keyboards, violin). The rest of the band's line-up currently consists of drummer Stéphane Misseghers, bassist Alan Gevaert, and guitarist/backing vocalist Simen Folstad Nilsen.

== History ==
=== Formation ===
Formed in 1991, dEUS began their career as a covers band, but soon began writing their own material. Their musical influences range from folk and punk to jazz and progressive rock. They first came to attention in Humo's Rock Rally of 1992, and after the release of the four-track EP "Zea", they were offered a recording contract with Island Records. They became the first Belgian indie act ever to sign to a major international label.

=== First era (1994–2000) ===
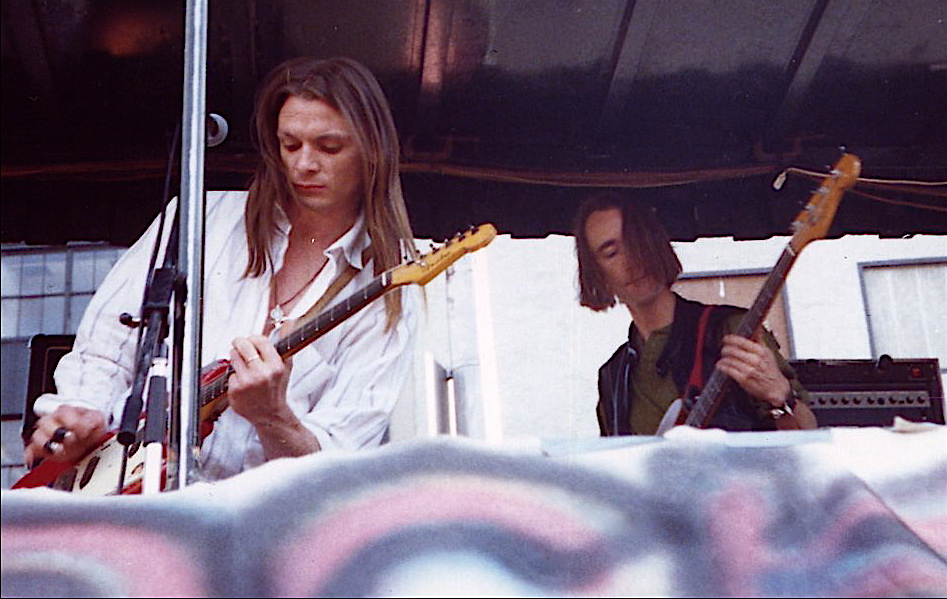
Chris Whitley on guitar with Alan Gevaert of dEUS in the late 1990s in New York City

dEUS's debut album Worst Case Scenario drew influences from Frank Zappa, Tom Waits and Captain Beefheart and was released on 16 September 1994 to critical acclaim. Shortly after followed the release of a highly experimental mail-order-only album entitled My Sister = My Clock, consisting of thirteen songs contained on one physical track. The follow-up album In a Bar, Under the Sea followed two years later, similar in style to its predecessor.

Their next album The Ideal Crash (1999) saw the manic eccentricity channelled into a more accessible guitar-driven package. Altogether, the band's first three albums (discounting My Sister = My Clock) sold over 750,000 copies worldwide and gathered them a cult following.

Meanwhile, dEUS had been subject to various line-up changes. After touring for Worst Case Scenario, guitarist Rudy Trouvé grew disillusioned with the band and the touring commitments and left to focus on his own projects including Kiss My Jazz, Dead Man Ray and The Love Substitutes. By the time In a Bar, Under the Sea came out, bassist Stef Kamil Carlens had also left the band to focus on his own side-project A Beatband (that became Moondog Jr then Zita Swoon). They were replaced by Craig Ward and Danny Mommens respectively. Eventually, the line-up was completed by touring guitarist Tim Vanhamel (Evil Superstars, Millionaire, Eagles of Death Metal).

=== Hiatus ===
After the tour in support of The Ideal Crash, the band took an extended hiatus that allowed the individual members to pursue different interests. Barman directed a film, Any Way the Wind Blows, in 2003, and teamed up with techno record producer CJ Bolland to form Magnus in 2004. In June 2002, dEUS did however play six concerts in Portugal, the Netherlands and Belgium, supporting the CD and DVD release of their singles collection, No More Loud Music.

=== Second era (2004–present) ===
In mid-2004, with new drummer Stéphane Misseghers, they began recording new material and playing live across Europe, and in August the download-only single "If You Don't Get What You Want" was released. During the recording of the album both Craig Ward and Danny Mommens left to be replaced by Alan Gevaert and Mauro Pawlowski (also from Evil Superstars) respectively. On 12 September 2005 the album Pocket Revolution was released. The release of the new album was supported by a world tour of over 130 concerts. The final concert of the 2005/2006 Pocket Revolution tour took place on 1 October in dEUS's hometown of Antwerp, Belgium. dEUS performed that day as part of the 0110 Festival for Tolerance. This free festival, an initiative of lead singer Tom Barman, saw possibly the largest number of Belgian artists ever assembled perform that day in Antwerp, Ghent, Brussels and Charleroi in support of Tolerance and to oppose extremism and violence.

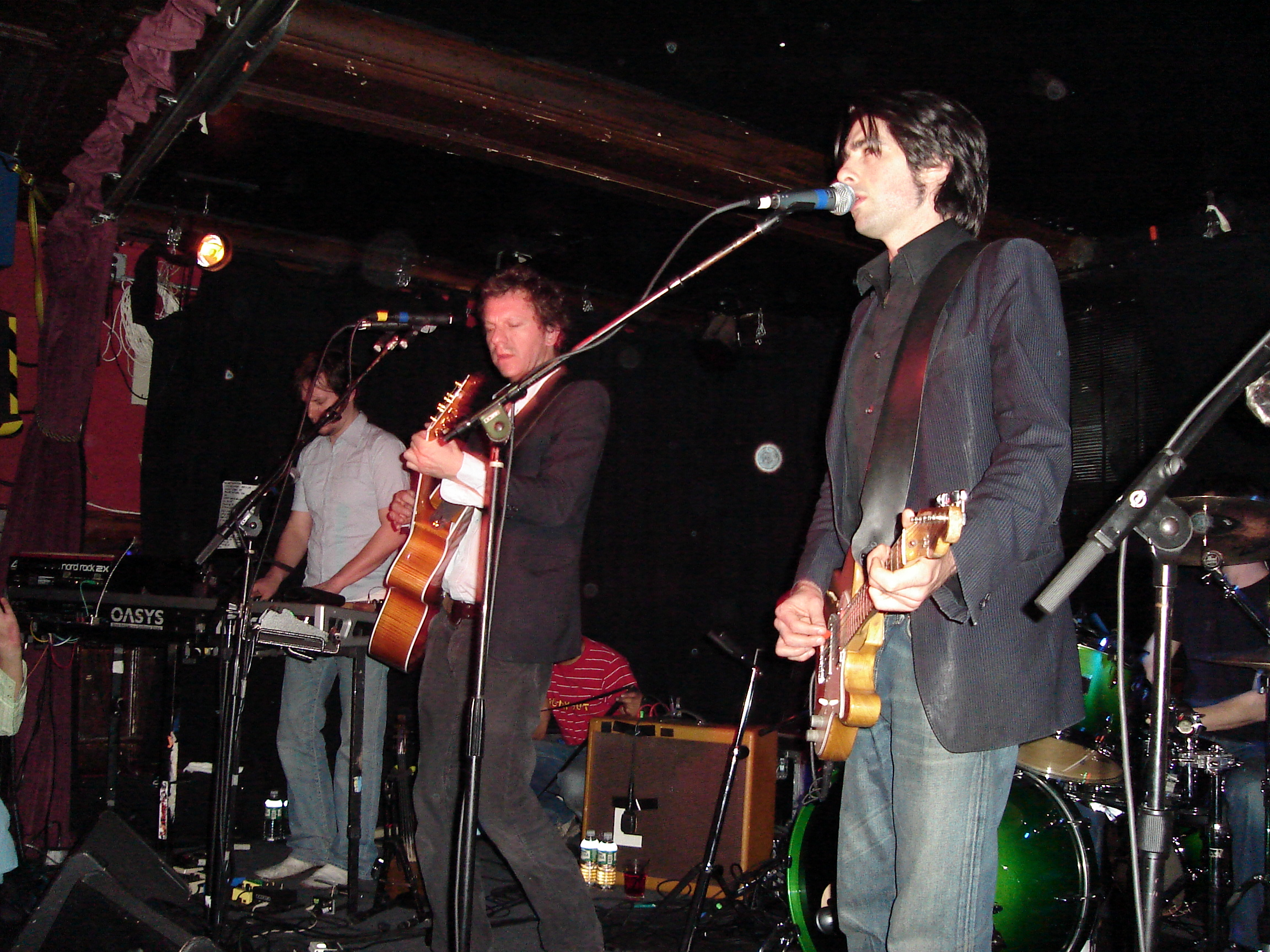
dEUS concert in San Francisco, 2006

After finishing their Pocket Revolution tour, the band began rehearsals for the writing and recording process of their next album. In 2007 dEUS built their own studio in Antwerp to continue work on their next album, Vantage Point, which was released in April 2008.

Keep You Close was released in September 2011, featuring Greg Dulli. The title track of the album was premiered on 16 June 2011 on "C'est Lenoir", a show on radio France Inter, presented by Bernard Lenoir. The first single off the new record, "Constant Now", was released on 19 September 2011. Keep You Close received rave reviews: Q rewarded the record with 4 out of 5 stars, saying "The Belgian Elbow hit new heights on sixth effort". Sputnikmusic gave the album 5 out of 5, describing the record as "a real grower album" and "Keep you Close may not be the best dEUS album ever, but it's still certainly one of the finest albums to have come out this year and one of the finest albums in the band's entire career." In October 2011 the band won the "Best Belgian Act" award at the MTV Europe Music Awards.

In June 2012, they released Following Sea. It received glowing reviews from the Belgian and European press.

In October 2016, they announced through Facebook that Mauro Pawlowski would leave the band after a final concert in Antwerp the following February, then on 6 February 2018, they announced through Facebook that Bruno De Groote will be the new guitar player of the band.

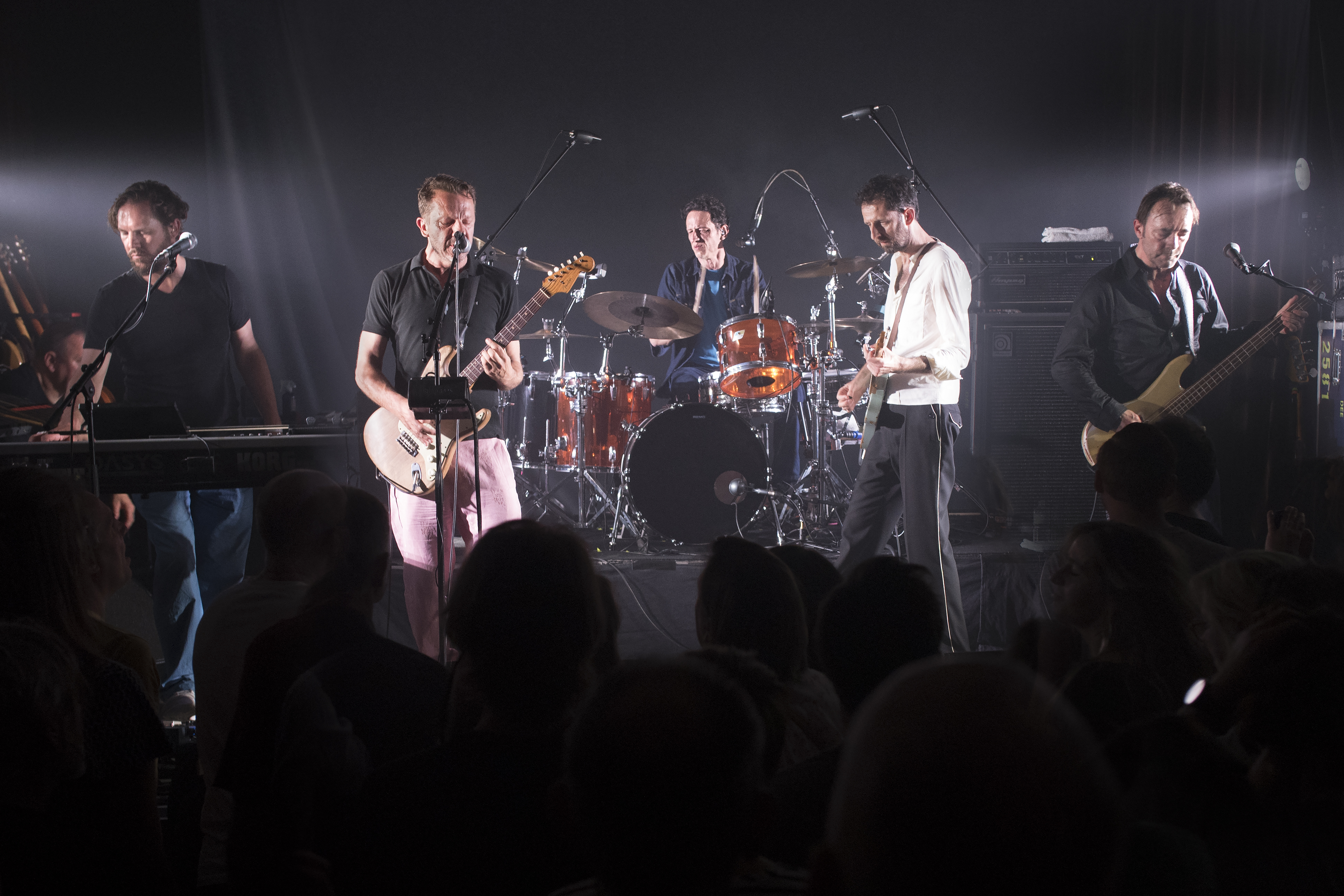
dEUS performing in 2019

In August 2021 it was announced that Bruno De Groote had suffered a stroke the year before and was leaving to take care of his health. Pawlowski rejoined, initially just to replace De Groote in their upcoming shows, and then full-time. Both Pawlowski and De Groote appear on How to Replace It (released 17 February 2023) although neither are listed as members of the band. Pawlowski left the band for a second time in June 2025, initially citing health issues, but it was later confirmed by Barman in an interview in Het Nieuwsblad that he was to be replaced by Simen Folstad Nilsen full-time. Prior, Stef Kamil Carlens had made a short comeback with the group for a few summer performances in Belgium, 30 years after he left.

== Discography ==
=== Studio albums ===
- Worst Case Scenario (1994)
- In a Bar, Under the Sea (1996)
- The Ideal Crash (1999)
- Pocket Revolution (2005)
- Vantage Point (2008)
- Keep You Close (2011)
- Following Sea (2012)
- How to Replace It (2023)

== Associated acts ==
- Evil Superstars
- The Love Substitutes
- Trixie Whitley
- Millionaire
- Soulwax
- Vive la Fête
- Zita Swoon
- Guy Van Nueten
- Karin Dreijer
