= Dead Man Ray =

Belgian alternative rock band

- Origin: Berchem, Belgium
- Genres: Rock
- Years active: 1996–present
- Members: Daan Stuyven; Rudy Trouvé; Elko Blijweert; Wouter Van Belle; Karel De Backer
- Past members: Herman Houbrechts

Dead Man Ray is a Belgian alternative rock band formed in 1996, originating from Berchem near Antwerp. Among its members are Daan Stuyven, Rudy Trouvé (dEUS and others), Elko Blijweert, Wouter Van Belle, and Herman Houbrechts, who was later replaced by drummer Karel De Backer. Their debut Berchem was released in 1998, including the singles "Chemical" and "Beegee". In 1999 Dead Man Ray wrote partly a new soundtrack for the movie At the Drop of A Head (alias "Café zonder bier" i.e. A Pub With No Beer, 1962), starring singer-songwriter Bobbejaan Schoepen. They did a sell out tour with this movie in Belgium and the Netherlands. The second album, Trap, was released in 2000 and contains some songs of this project. The album Cago was recorded in 2002 in Chicago and produced by Steve Albini.

After Cago and the accompanying live tour, the band went on a long hiatus. Daan Stuyven produced a number of albums under his own name, Rudy Trouvé recorded with his own sextet/septet and wrote music for theatre plays, Elko Blijweert and Karel De Backer performed in a number of bands while Wouter Van Belle returned to his work as a record producer.

This hiatus lasted about 16 years, when in december 2018 the band announced a new EP Een, and a full album Over in 2019, followed by a live tour in Belgium.

== Discography ==
=== Studio albums ===
- Berchem (1998)
- Trap (2000)
- Berchem Trap (2000)
- Marginal (2001)
- Cago (2002)
- Een (2018)
- Over (2019)
