= Following Sea =

Studio album by Deus
- Released: 1 June 2012
- Studio: Motor Music (Mechelen, Belgium); Vantage Point Studio (Antwerp, Belgium)
- Length: 42:53
- Label: Play It Again Sam
- Producer: Adam Noble; David Bottrill

Deus chronology
Keep You Close (2011)	Following Sea (2012)	Selected Songs 1994–2014 (2014)

Professional ratings
Review scores
Source	Rating
musicOMH	3/5 stars

Following Sea is the seventh studio album by Belgian rock band Deus. It was released on 1 June 2012 by Play It Again Sam. The band's previous album, Keep You Close, was released less than a year previously, making this an uncharacteristically quick release.

== Track listing ==
All lyrics are written by Tom Barman; all music is composed by Deus.

No.	Title	Length
1.	"Quatre Mains"	4:55
2.	"Sirens"	4:12
3.	"Hidden Wounds"	6:15
4.	"Girls Keep Drinking"	3:48
5.	"Nothings"	2:29
6.	"The Soft Fall"	4:05
7.	"Crazy About You"	3:45
8.	"The Give Up Gene"	4:57
9.	"Fire Up the Google Beast Algorithm"	2:04
10.	"One Thing About Waves"	6:23

== Charts ==
=== Weekly charts ===
Chart (2012)	Peak position
Belgian Albums (Ultratop Flanders)	1
Belgian Albums (Ultratop Wallonia)	3
Dutch Albums (Album Top 100)	7
French Albums (SNEP)	90
Swiss Albums (Schweizer Hitparade)	39

=== Year-end charts ===
Chart (2012)	Position
Belgian Albums (Ultratop Flanders)	5
Belgian Albums (Ultratop Wallonia)	67

== Certifications ==
Region	Certification	Certified units/sales
Belgium (BRMA)	Gold	15,000^{*}
^{*} Sales figures based on certification alone.
