= The Tritones =

Cappella group

- Years active: 1996–present
- Members: Soprano; Zoey Graziano '25; Indeera Pujar '26; Cianna Noah '28 Mezzo; Elisa Vazquez '25; Jaena Sola '26; Abigail-Monique Frondoza '27; Alisa Costello '27; Maya Bangalore '28 Alto; Leah Nemorovski '27; Anna Renolayan '27; Jaelyn Arenzana '28; Lasya Gangadari '28 Tenor; Braden Nucum '26; Mason Vigil '28 Baritone; Devean Felix '26; Jake Goldman '26; Thomas Le '28 Bass; Sasha Kourjanski '24; Davin Rozsa '27; Nathan Tatsuta '28
- Website: http://www.ucsdtritones.com

The Tritones are an a cappella co-ed group from the University of California, San Diego. The group was founded in 1996 and is the first of nine a cappella groups on the campus. The group is composed of 14-22 undergraduate and graduate students from the university and sings a variety of genres, from jazz to Top 40's. The Group frequently competes in the International Championship of Collegiate A Cappella.

The Tritones have performed alongside Taylor Swift at the 2010 Country Music Awards and opened for the Far East Movement. On their sophomore EP release, "Seven Nation Army" received a nomination for a CARA Award by the Contemporary A Cappella Society.

== Recordings ==
The Tritones have recorded multiple albums, released EPs on iTunes in 2011 and 2012, and a full-length album in 2015.

=== Augment - EP ===
- "Haven't Met You Yet" (Michael Bublé)
- "You Belong With Me" (Taylor Swift)
- "Teenage Dream" (Katy Perry)
- "Speechless" (Lady Gaga)
- "Teenage Dream" (Katy Perry)

=== Take My Heart - EP ===
- "Seven Nation Army" (The White Stripes)
- "Someone Like You" (Adele)
- "Perfect" (P!nk)
- "My Heart With You" (The Rescues)
- "Domino" (Jessie J)

=== Out of Control ===
- "Pumped Up Kicks" (Foster The People)
- "This is How We Roll" (Florida Georgia Line)
- "Drake Medley" (Drake)
- "Carry On" (Fun)
- "The A Team" (Ed Sheeran)
- "Neighborhood Punks" (Daft Punk & The Neighbourhood)
- "Rather Be" (Clean Bandit)
