= Worst Case Scenario (album) =

Studio album by Deus
- Released: 16 September 1994
- Genres: Art rock, experimental rock
- Length: 55:13
- Labels: Bang!, Island Records
- Producers: Peter Vermeersch, Pierre Vervloesem

Deus chronology
Zea (1993)	Worst Case Scenario (1994)	My Sister = My Clock (1995)

Professional ratings
Review scores
Source	Rating
AllMusic	4.5/5 stars
HUMO	4/4 stars
NME	8/10

Worst Case Scenario is the debut studio album by Belgian rock band Deus released in 1994. The cover art was designed by guitarist Rudy Trouvé. It contains the single "Suds & Soda", which became an underground hit and a fan favorite.

The album was first released in Belgium on the indie label Bang! with a different track listing: "Right as Rain" and "Great American Nude" (both tracks present on the Zea EP released in Belgium in 1993) are replaced by the song "Let Go". It was then released in the UK and Europe through Island Records with the track listing as written below.

The song "W.C.S. (First Draft)" uses the bass line from Frank Zappa's "Little Umbrellas", from his 1969 album, Hot Rats.

Worst Case Scenario received good reviews internationally despite the hard time that the British media had to categorize its music into a genre. They finally called it Art rock (a definition which still bothers singer Tom Barman).

Worst Case Scenario reached Gold in Belgium, selling 30,000 copies. By April 2008, WCS had sold 270,000 copies worldwide.

== Track listing (International Version) ==
No.	Title	Writer(s)	Length
1.	"Intro"	Tom Barman; Jules de Borgher	0:24
2.	"Suds & Soda"	Deus	5:14
3.	"W.C.S. (First Draft)"	Barman; Stef Kamil Carlens	5:05
4.	"Jigsaw You"	Barman; Carlens	2:26
5.	"Morticiachair"	Deus	4:23
6.	"Via"	Barman; Mark Meyers	4:12
7.	"Right as Rain"	Barman; Carlens; Rudy Trouvé	4:27
8.	"Mute"	Barman	3:57
9.	"Let's Get Lost"	Barman; Carlens	4:23
10.	"Hotellounge (Be the Death of Me)"	Barman; Trouvé	6:23
11.	"Shake Your Hip"	Deus	0:41
12.	"Great American Nude"	Trouvé	5:39
13.	"Secret Hell"	Barman	4:59
14.	"Divebomb Djingle"	Carlens; Christie; Ward	3:00
Total length:			55:13

== Track listing (Belgian Version) ==
No.	Title	Writer(s)	Length
1.	"Intro"	Tom Barman; Jules de Borgher	0:24
2.	"Suds & Soda"	Deus	5:17
3.	"W.C.S. (First Draft)"	Barman; Stef Kamil Carlens	5:07
4.	"Jigsaw You"	Barman; Carlens	2:29
5.	"Morticiachair"	Deus	4:26
6.	"Via"	Barman; Mark Meyers	4:16
7.	"Let Go"	Deus	2:00
8.	"Mute"	Barman	4:04
9.	"Secret Hell"	Barman	5:04
10.	"Let's Get Lost"	Barman; Carlens	4:25
11.	"Hotellounge (Be the Death of Me)"	Barman; Trouvé	6:28
12.	"Shake Your Hip"	Deus	0:49
13.	"Divebomb Djingle"	Carlens; Christie; Ward	2:59
Total length:			47:48

== B-Sides and Rarities (2009 Deluxe Edition Bonus Disc) ==
No.	Title	Length
1.	"Zea Intro Replica"	0:37
2.	"Zea"	4:59
3.	"Texan Coffee"	1:09
4.	"It. Furniture In The Far West"	0:53
5.	"Violins And Happy Endings"	4:59
6.	"Great American Nude (strip mix)"	3:43
7.	"Niche"	2:04
8.	"Jigsaw You (live at the Oasis, Brussels)"	4:16
9.	"Whose Vegas (Is It Anyway)"	3:53
10.	"Morticiachair (live London Astoria II)"	4:29
11.	"Let Go"	2:01
12.	"Suds & Soda (by Die Anarchistische Abendunterhaltung)"	4:35
13.	"Kinderballade"	5:13
14.	"Dea (demo)"	6:27
15.	"Suds & Soda (demo)"	5:32
16.	"Secret Hell (live)"	5:00
17.	"Mute (live)"	5:03
Total length:		64:53

== Staff ==
- Tom Barman - vocals, guitar, piano
- Rudy Trouvé - guitar, vocals, piano, steel plate
- Stef Kamil Carlens - bass, vocals, guitar
- Klaas Janzoons - violin, vocals
- Julle de Borgher - drums, metallophone, gasheating, timpani, maracas, guitar, vocals

== Singles ==
- Suds & Soda (June 1994)
- Via (October 1994)
- Hotellounge (Be the death of me) (January 1995) - #55 UK

Charts references:

== Charts ==
Chart performance for Worst Case Scenario
Chart (1994–1995)	Peak position
Belgian Albums (Ultratop Flanders)	35
Scottish Albums (Official Charts)	79
UK Albums (Official Charts)	90

Chart (2026)	Peak position
Belgian Albums (Ultratop Flanders)	14
Belgian Albums (Ultratop Wallonia)	35
Dutch Vinyl Albums (Dutch Charts)	15
