= Millionaire (band) =

Belgian indie rock band

- Origin: Belgium
- Genres: Indie rock; alternative rock; hard rock; noise rock
- Years active: 1999–present
- Labels: Play It Again Sam; Reprise
- Members: Tim Vanhamel; Dave Schroyen; Bas Remans; Aldo Struyf
- Past members: Ben Wyers

Millionaire is a Belgian indie rock band led by Tim Vanhamel, drawing on influences from stoner rock, indie and industrial rock music.

== History ==
Millionaire was formed in 1999 by former Evil Superstars and dEUS guitarist Tim Vanhamel. In 2001 they recorded their first album, entitled Outside the Simian Flock .

During a concert opening for the Masters of Reality in the SMAK (Ghent) they came to the attention of Josh Homme of the Queens of the Stone Age. Subsequently, they were asked to support Queens of the Stone Age on their European and American tours, and have since toured with Muse and Foo Fighters.

At the begin of 2004 the band started the works for the album Paradisiac, but during the recording session the guitarist Ben Wyers left the band.

In 2005 the band released their second album Paradisiac produced by Josh Homme and finetuned at the studio of fellow Queen of the Stone Age Alain Johannes. Homme has also played guitar with Millionaire for some live performances.

In 2006 Millionaire toured with the Taste of Chaos 2006 festival in the US.

In 2007 the band contributed two songs to the soundtrack of Belgian film Ex Drummer, "Deep Fish" and a cover of the Devo song "Mongoloid".

On 5 December 2008 they announced they were working on a new album, but no new material ever surfaced.

Their album Sciencing was nominated for IMPALA's European Album of the Year Award.

== Members ==
Original line-up:

- Tim Vanhamel – vocals, guitar, keyboards, programming (1999–present)
- Dave Schroyen – drums (1999–present)
- Bas Remans – bass guitar (1999–present)
- Aldo Struyf – guitar, keyboards (1999–present)

Past members:

- Ben Wyers – guitar (1999–2005)

== Discography ==
=== Albums ===
- Outside the Simian Flock (2001)
- Paradisiac (2005)
- Sciencing (2017)
- APPLZ ≠ APPLZ (2020)

=== Singles ===
- "Body Experience Revue" (2001)
- "She's a Doll" (2002)
- "Me Crazy, You Sane" (2002)
- "Come With You" (2002)
- "Champagne" (2003)
- "For a Maid" (2005)
- "I'm on a High" (2005)
- "Rise and Fall" (2005)
- "Ballad of Pure Thought" (2006)
- "I'm Not Who You Think You Are" (2017)
- "Love Has Eyes" (2017)
- "Silent River" (2018)
- "Don't" (2019)
- "Cornucopia" (2019)
- "Can't Stop the Noise" (2020)
- "Strange Days" (2020)

== Side projects ==
Aldo Struyf and Dave Schroyen also play with Creature with the Atom Brain.
