= Zea (EP) =

EP by Deus
- Released: June 1993
- Genre: Alternative rock, experimental rock, indie rock
- Label: Bang! Records
- Producer: Peter Vermeersch, Pierre Vervloesem

Deus chronology
| Zea (1993) | Worst Case Scenario (1994) |

Zea is an EP by Belgian rock band Deus. It was first released in June 1993. This EP was released prior to the group's contract with Island Records.

== Track listing ==
1. "Intro Zea Replica" – 0:37
2. "Zea" – 5:00
3. "Right as Rain" – 4:31
4. "Great American Nude" – 5:38

=== Jack & Johnny Edition ===
1. "Zea" – 5:38
2. "Right As Rain" – 4:31
3. "Great American Nude" – 5:38
