= Zita Swoon =

Belgian indie rock band

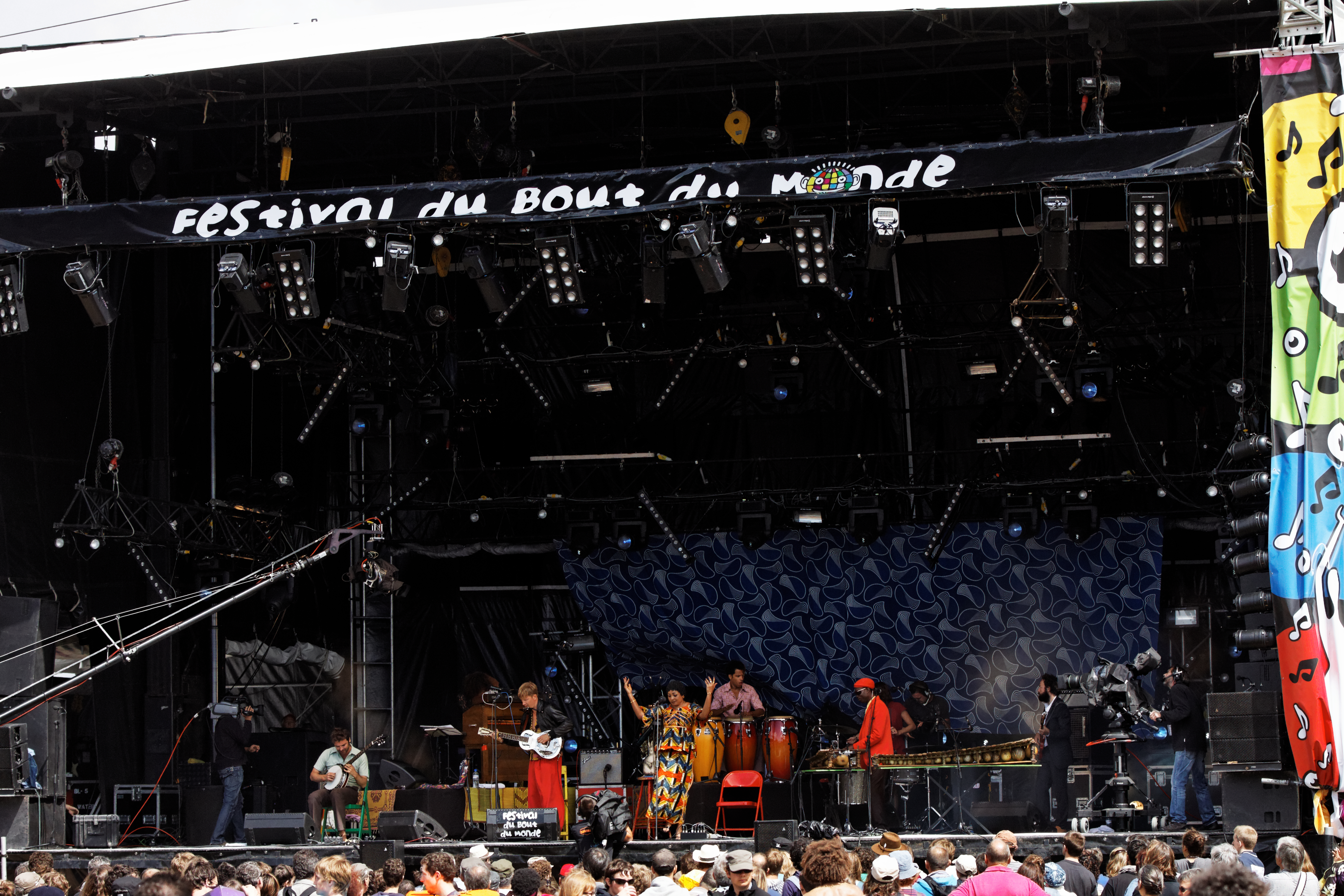
- Zita Swoon in 2012

Background information
- Origin: Antwerp, Belgium
- Genres: Indie rock
- Years active: 1993–present

Zita Swoon is a Belgian indie rock group. They entered the music scene of Antwerp in 1993, still under the name A Beatband with the EP Jintro Travels The Word In A Skirt. The group is typical of the music scene in Antwerp, with members playing in numerous other groups. Singer, musician and composer Stef Kamil Carlens founded the group together with Aarich Jespers and also played in dEUS.

The same group released Everyday I Wear A Greasy Black Feather On My Hat under the name Moondog Jr. in 1995. Shortly thereafter they encountered legal trouble over the name Moondog with Louis T. Hardin, and changed it to Zita Swoon (Zita = intense, Swoon = desire). The success of this album was awarded with invitations to the Lowlands, Pinkpop and Rock Werchter festivals. The same year they also appeared live on MTV in Most Wanted with Michael Blair.

Their first appearance in the US was at the South by Southwest festival in 1998. Zita Swoon has played in New York, the Belgian Rock Werchter festival, the Holland Festival, as well as in Germany. In early 1999 their work was recognized by the Flemish government with a grant of 1.5 million Francs and the title Cultural Ambassador of Flanders (a title previously awarded to DAAU and dEUS).

In 2009 Stef Kamil Carlens participated with Lexus Concert, a 'hybrid' concert where Stef does a crossover concert at Klara festival with a musician from a totally different style and background. The winner of Lexus concert wins a private try out concert on board a new Lexus RX 450h.

== Members ==
=== Original members ===
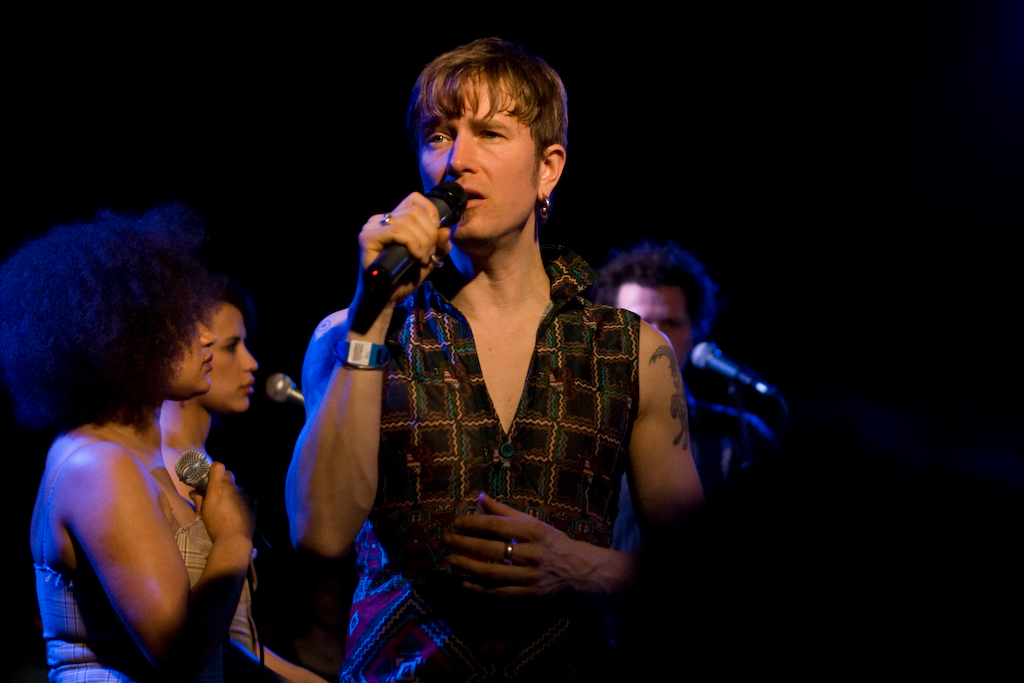
Stef Kamil Carlens, Band in a box at Het Depot (Leuven)

- Stef Kamil Carlens – vocals, guitar, piano
- Aarich Jespers – drums, percussion

=== Additional members ===
- Amel Serra – percussion
- Joris Caluwaerts – piano, Rhodes
- Bart Van Lierde – bass
- Eva Gysel – backing vocals
- Kapinga Gysel – backing vocals

=== Ex-members ===
- Tom Pintens – guitar, backing vocals, piano, clarinet (as of April 2008) (died 2023)
- Kobe Proesmans – percussion
- Thomas de Smet – bass
- Bjorn Eriksson – guitar
- Benjamin Boutreur – saxophone
- Leonie Gysel – backing vocals

== Discography ==
=== As A Beatband ===
- Jintro Travels the Word in a Skirt (1993)

=== As Moondog Jr. ===
- Everyday I Wear A Greasy Black Feather On My Hat (1995)

=== As Zita Swoon ===
Studio albums:

- I Paint Pictures on a Wedding Dress (1998)
- Life = A Sexy Sanctuary (2001)
- A Song About a Girls (2004)
- Big City (2007)
- Big Blueville (2008)

Live albums:

- Live at Jet Studio Brussels (2001)
- A Band in a Box (CD and DVD) (2005)

Soundtracks:

- Music inspired by Sunrise, a film by F.W. Murnau (1997)
- Plage Tattoo/Circumstances (music from the performance) (2000)

Compilations:

- To Play, To Dream, To Drift – An Anthology (2009)

=== As Zita Swoon Group ===
- Dancing With The Sound Hobbyist (2011)
- Wait for Me (2012)
- New Old World (2014)
- Nothing That Is Everything (2015)

== See also ==
- Indie rock in Belgium
