= In a Bar, Under the Sea =

Studio album by dEUS
- Released: 16 September 1996
- Genre: Experimental rock, art rock, jazz rock
- Length: 60:26
- Label: Bang!, Island
- Producer: Eric Drew Feldman

DEUS chronology
My Sister = My Clock (EP) (1995)	In a Bar, Under the Sea (1996)	The Ideal Crash (1999)

Professional ratings
Review scores
Source	Rating
AllMusic	4.5/5 stars
The Guardian	3/5 stars
Pitchfork	8.1/10
Spin	8/10

In a Bar, Under the Sea is the second studio album by Belgian rock band dEUS. The cover art was designed by guitarist Rudy Trouvé. The original Belgian release was by Bang!, with the only difference that track 14 is simply named "Roses", like the single.

The album was produced by Eric Drew Feldman (who was keyboard and bass player for Captain Beefheart in the late seventies and early eighties) and welcomes guests such as Scott McCloud from Girls Against Boys (on Fell Off the Floor, Man), Dana Colley from Morphine (on Supermarketsong) and Bart Maris from X-Legged Sally (on Nine Threads).

In a Bar, Under the Sea reached Platinum in Belgium (selling over 25,000 copies) and sold around 250,000 copies worldwide.

== Track listing ==
No.	Title	Writer(s)	Length
1.	"I Don't Mind What Ever Happens"	Stef Kamil Carlens	0:46
2.	"Fell Off the Floor, Man"	Tom Barman; Jules de Borgher; Carlens; Rudy Trouvé; Craig Ward	5:13
3.	"Opening Night"	Barman; de Borgher; Carlens; Ward; Klaas Janzoons	1:38
4.	"Theme from Turnpike"	Barman	5:46
5.	"Little Arithmetics"	Barman; Ward	4:30
6.	"Gimme the Heat"	Barman; Carlens; Ward	7:38
7.	"Serpentine"	Barman	3:17
8.	"A Shocking Lack Thereof"	Barman; Carlens; Janzoons; Ward	5:52
9.	"Supermarketsong"	Barman; Carlens; Trouvé	1:56
10.	"Memory of a Festival"	Barman	1:52
11.	"Guilty Pleasures"	Barman; de Borgher; Carlens; Janzoons; Ward	4:23
12.	"Nine Threads"	Ward	3:34
13.	"Disappointed in the Sun"	Barman; Piet Jorens	6:03
14.	"For the Roses" (also named "Roses")	Barman; Carlens	4:57
15.	"Wake Me Up Before I Sleep"	Tom Barman	2:53
Total length:			60:26

== Personnel ==
=== dEUS ===
- Stef Kamil Carlens: vocal, guitar, bass, double bass, percussion, claps
- Tom Barman: vocal, guitar, Hammond, Talkback, samples, percussion, synthesiser, cma^s
- Jules de Borgher: drums, percussion, bells, claps
- Craig Ward: vocal, guitar, sax, mandolin, claps, ukulele, slide guitar
- Klaas Janzoons: vocal, percussion, Talkback, piano, violin, synthesiser, beatbox, claps
- Rudy Trouvé: vocal, piccolo, harmonica, guitar, ukulele

=== guest musicians ===
- Didier Fontaine: Vocal
- Scott McCloud: "philosophy"
- Eric Drew Feldman: Hammond, percussion, egg, piano
- Pieter Lamot: trombone
- Ian Humphries: violin
- Charles Mutter: violin
- Nic Pendlebury: viola
- Deirdre Cooper: cello
- Dana Colley: saxophones
- Vincienne: claps
- Jim Brumby: claps, rate and depth
- Piet Jorens: piano, gong
- Bart Maris: trumpet

== Singles ==
- "Theme from Turnpike" (June 1996)- #68 UK
- "Little Arithmetics" (October 1996)- #44 UK
- "For the Roses" (December 1996)- #56 UK
- "Fell Off the Floor, Man" - Belgian only single (June 1997)

Charts references: https://www.officialcharts.com/
