= Rudy Trouvé =

Belgian musician

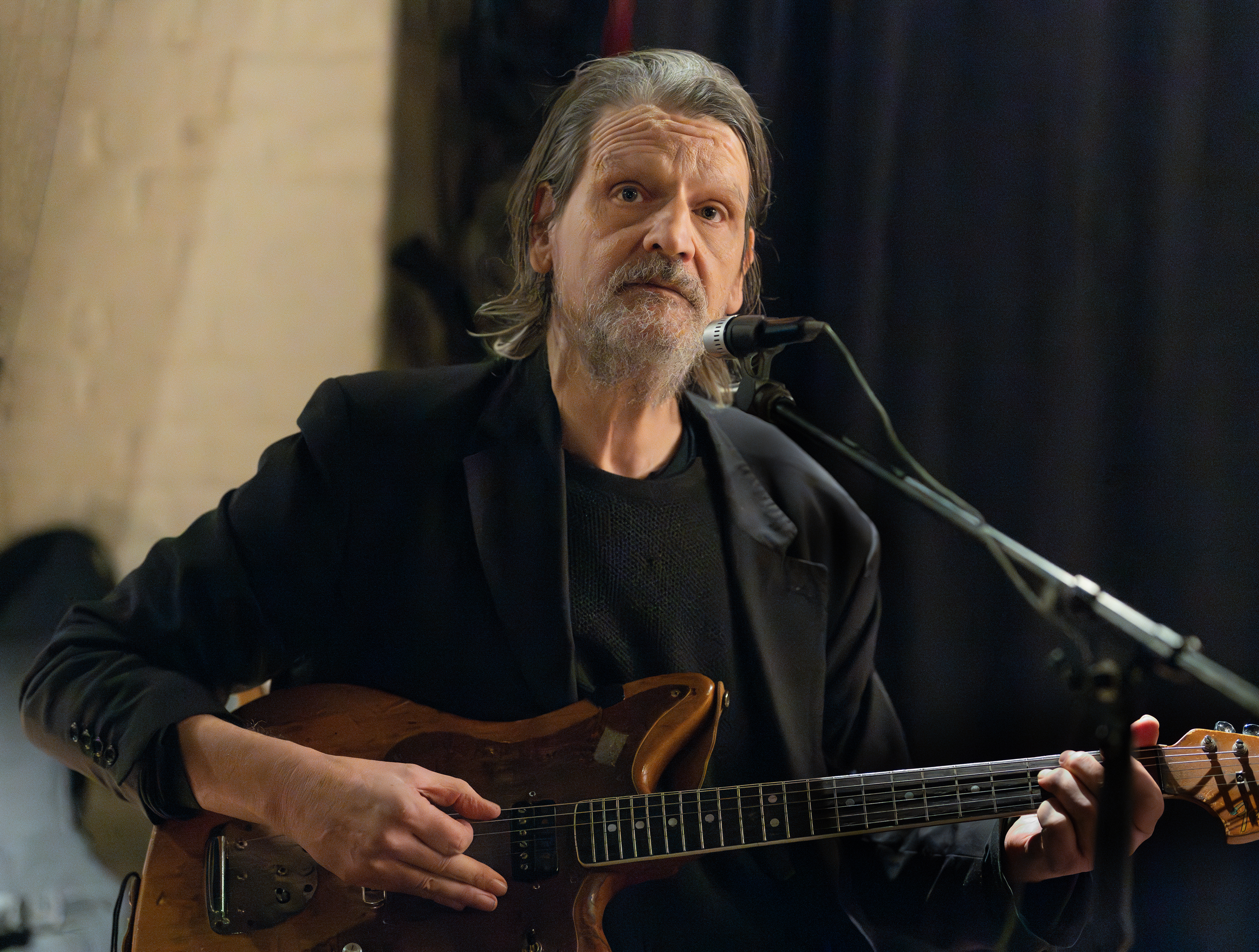
- Trouvé (2024)

Background information
- Born: 28 January 1967 (age 59); Wilrijk, Belgium
- Occupations: Musician, artist, record producer
- Instrument: Guitar
- Labels: Sub Rosa, Jezus Factory, Heaven Hotel
- Website: www.heavenhotel.be

Rudy Trouvé (born 28 January 1967) is a Belgian musician.

In the early nineties, he founded the Heavenhotel record label and released dozens of records since. Between 1993 and 1995 he was part of Deus, quitting the band in favour of focusing on his own solo career, other music groups and temporary collaborations.

Post-Deus, Trouvé formed the bands Kiss My Jazz and Dead Man Ray, and in 2002, recorded a split album with Lou Barlow on the Sub Rosa label. Trouvé has also released a number of collaborations and albums via Jezus Factory Records.

Trouvé also performs improvisational jam sessions, experimental concerts and exhibitions, including collaborations with Mauro Pawlowski, Zeitkratzer Ensemble (Germany), Marc Ribot (US), Pierre Bastien, Pierre Berthet, members of DAAU, Zita Swoon, among others. In 2020, he formed Dino and the Chicks, and appeared on Kloot Per W's Arbre A Filles album in 2022.

As a former student at St-Lucas in Ghent, Rudy Trouvé is known for his artwork: figurative paintings and blow-ups. His artwork has been used for album covers, including Worst Case Scenario by dEUS.

== See also ==
- In Docs Place Friday Evening, 1996, Knitting Factory
- In Coffee We Trust, 1996, Knitting Factory
- In the Lost Souls Convention, 1997, Heaven Hotel
- In a Service Station, 1999, Heaven Hotel

== Selected discography ==
- Rudy Trouvé / Lou Barlow – Subsonic 6 (Sub Rosa, 2000)
- Rudy Trouvé – Une Chanson (EP, 2002)
- Rudy Trouvé – 1999 – 2002 a.k.a. Rather quiet songs (Heaven Hotel, 2002)
- Rudy Trouvé – Cartoon Moon (EP, 2002)
- The Rudy Trouvé Sextet – 2002 – 2003 a.k.a. In an introvert but danceable mood (2004)
- The Rudy Trouvé Sextet – Tu Sais a.k.a. The French EP (2004)
- Rudy and The Unforgettable Wally's – We met on an airport and went through tape (2007)
- The Rudy Trouvé Septet – Songs and Stuff Recorded Between 2003 and 2007 Part One (Heaven Hotel, 2007)
- Rudy Trouvé / Craig Ward / Mauro Pawlowski – Pawlowski, Trouvé & Ward (Jezus Factory, 2007)
- The Rudy Trouvé Septet – Songs and Stuff Recorded Between 2003 and 2007 Part Two (Heaven Hotel, 2009)
- The Rudy Trouvé Septet – Allright (Heaven Hotel, 2009)
- The Rudy Trouvé Septet – 2007 – 2009 (Heaven Hotel, 2009)
- Rudy Trouvé / Craig Ward / Mauro Pawlowski – II (Jezus Factory, 2017)
- Rudy Trouvé – 2009-2025 (Heaven Hotel, 2025)

== Band history ==
- Dead Man Ray
- dEUS
- Gore Slut
- Kiss My Jazz
- The Love Substitutes
- Rudy Trouvé Sextet/Septet
- Rudy and the Unforgettable Wally's
- Vivants
- Dino and the Chicks
