= C. J. Bolland =

English-Belgian music producer (born 1971)

C.J. Bolland
- Born: Christian Jay Bolland; 18 June 1971 (age 55); Stockton-on-Tees, County Durham, England
- Occupations: Producer, musician, remixer

Christian Jay "C. J." Bolland (born 18 June 1971, Stockton-on-Tees, England) is an English-Belgian techno producer and remixer with British roots.

Born in Stockton-on-Tees, County Durham, Bolland's family moved to Antwerp in Flanders, Belgium, when he was three years old. As a teenager, he was strongly influenced by the Belgian underground scene of new wave, electro and EBM embodied by artists such as Front 242, Neon Judgement and the Klinik.

== Producing, R&S Records signing ==
His first productions were aired on Belgium's Liaisons Dangereuses radio show, and Bolland was one of the first record producers to be signed to the fledgling Belgian techno record label R&S. His first release, "Do That Dance" in 1989, was followed by several more under different aliases such as 'Space Opera', 'The Project', 'Cee-Jay' and 'Pulse'. Bolland's first major success with the track "Horsepower" on 1991's Ravesignal III EP earned him industry attention and respect with wide airplay amongst European techno DJs. In 1992, the album The 4th Sign, including the singles "Camargue" and "Nightbreed" saw him garner further acclaim and commercial success. Bolland's second album for R&S, Electronic Highway, was released in 1995.

== Internal Records ==
In late 1994, Bolland left R&S to sign a five album recording contract with Internal/PolyGram. During this time, he became notable as the first artist to release an album in the DJ-Kicks series for the independent label Studio !K7, 1995's DJ-Kicks: C.J. Bolland. His first studio album for PolyGram was 1996's The Analogue Theatre from which his greatest commercial success came with the single "Sugar Is Sweeter", hitting No. 1 on the United States Hot Dance Club Play chart, and reaching No. 11 on the UK Singles Chart.

Further UK hits followed with "The Prophet" (No. 19) and "It Ain't Gonna Be Me" (No. 35). Bolland is also a prolific remixer with a long résumé, including work with Orbital, Depeche Mode, Moby, the Prodigy and Tori Amos. His song "The Prophet", sampling Willem Dafoe in Martin Scorsese's 1990 film The Last Temptation of Christ was an underground club hit.

The songs "It Ain't Gonna Be Me" and "the tingler" were featured in the soundtrack of film Human Traffic.

In 2000, Bolland released the song "Enter the Robot", a collaboration with Australian producer Honeysmack, and in 2002 started his own record label, Mole Records. February 2004 saw the release of The Body Gave You Everything, the debut album by Magnus, a pop/dance music collaborative project with Tom Barman, founder and singer for the Belgian rock band, dEUS. In December 2006, Bolland released a solo album titled The 5th Sign with the Belgian online record label The Wack Attack Barrack, followed in October 2009 by 500€ Cocktail on Wikkid Records.

== Discography ==
=== Albums ===
- The 4th Sign (1992)
- Electronic Highway (1995)
- The Analogue Theatre (1996) - UK No. 43
- The 5th Sign (2005)
- 500€ Cocktail (2009)

=== Singles and EPs ===
- "The Ravesignal" (1990)
- Ravesignal Vol. II (1990)
- Ravesignal III (1991)
- "Here We Go" / "Get Busy Time" (with The Project) (1991)
- Camargue (The Remixes) (1993)
- Live at Universe (1993)
- "Neural Paradox" (1995)
- "The Starship Connection" (1995)
- "There Can Only Be One" (1995)
- "Sugar Is Sweeter" (1996) - UK No. 11
- "The Prophet" / "Sugar Is Sweeter" (1996)
- "Desolate" / "The Tingler" (1996)
- "The Prophet" (1997) - UK No. 19
- "Sugar Is Sweeter" / "Blue Monday" (with Orgy) (1998)
- "How Do I Deal" / "Sugar Is Sweeter" (with Jennifer Love Hewitt) (1998)
- "It Ain't Gonna Be Me" (1999) - UK No. 35
- "Dark Side" / Camargue" (with Amex) (2000)
- "Inside Out" / "Cyrus" (with Psylocibin) (2000)
- "See Saw" (2002)
- "Prophet 1" / "The Prophet" (with Paul Oakenfold) (2002)
- "The Digger" (2003)
- "Riot" (2006)
- Radar Remixes (with T99) (2011)
- "Broken Showroom" (2012)
- "Chicago" (2012)
- Ban Me (Remixes) (2012)
- "The Return" (2019)

== See also ==
- List of number-one dance hits (United States)
- List of artists who reached number one on the U.S. dance chart
