= Tim Vanhamel =

Belgian rock musician (born 1977)

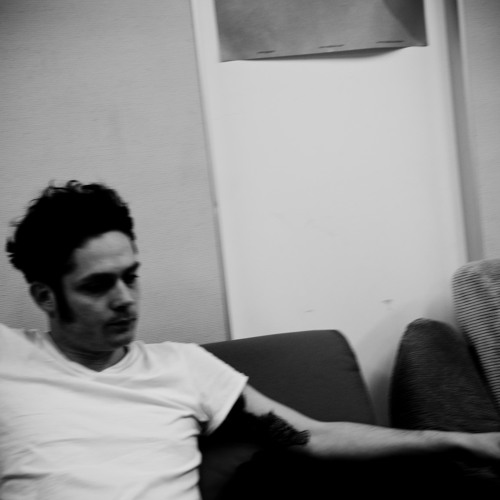

Background information
- Born: 11 December 1977 (age 48); Zonhoven, Belgium
- Genres: Alternative rock
- Occupations: Musician; songwriter
- Instruments: Guitar; vocals
- Years active: 1990–present
- Label: Play It Again Sam
- Formerly of: Eagles of Death Metal; Evil Superstars; Deus; Millionaire
- Website: Official site

Tim Wessel Vanhamel (born 11 December 1977) is a Belgian rock musician who has been a member of and performed with a number of bands including Evil Superstars, Deus and Eagles of Death Metal. He is also the frontman of his own bands Millionaire and Eat Lions.

== Career ==
Vanhamel played in his first band, Sister Poopoo, when he was 13. In 1995, at the age of 17, Vanhamel joined Evil Superstars as their guitarist. He played for the band until their split in 1998. He then played in Deus for a short time during their 'Ideal Crash' tour in 1999. In 2000, Vanhamel began recording the debut for his own band, Millionaire. Later, he played guitar as a guest on Eagles of Death Metal's debut album Peace, Love, Death Metal. He also toured as part of Eagles of Death Metal in their early days.

In 2007, Millionaire contributed to the soundtrack for the film Ex Drummer based on the novel by the Flemish author Herman Brusselmans. After its release the band started playing on summer festivals such as Marktrock among with other bands and Flip Kowlier as the Ex Drummer band. He recorded a solo album in 2007. First single 'Until I Find You' was premiered in November 2007. The full album Welcome to the Blue House was released 31 January 2008. In 2008, he contributed guest vocals to Millionaire bandmate Aldo Struyf's side-project, Creature with the Atom Brain.

== Discography ==
For Tim Vanhamel's discography with Evil Superstars, please see Evil Superstars.
For Tim Vanhamel's discography with Millionaire, please see Millionaire.

- Welcome to the Blue House (2008)
