= Stef Kamil Carlens =

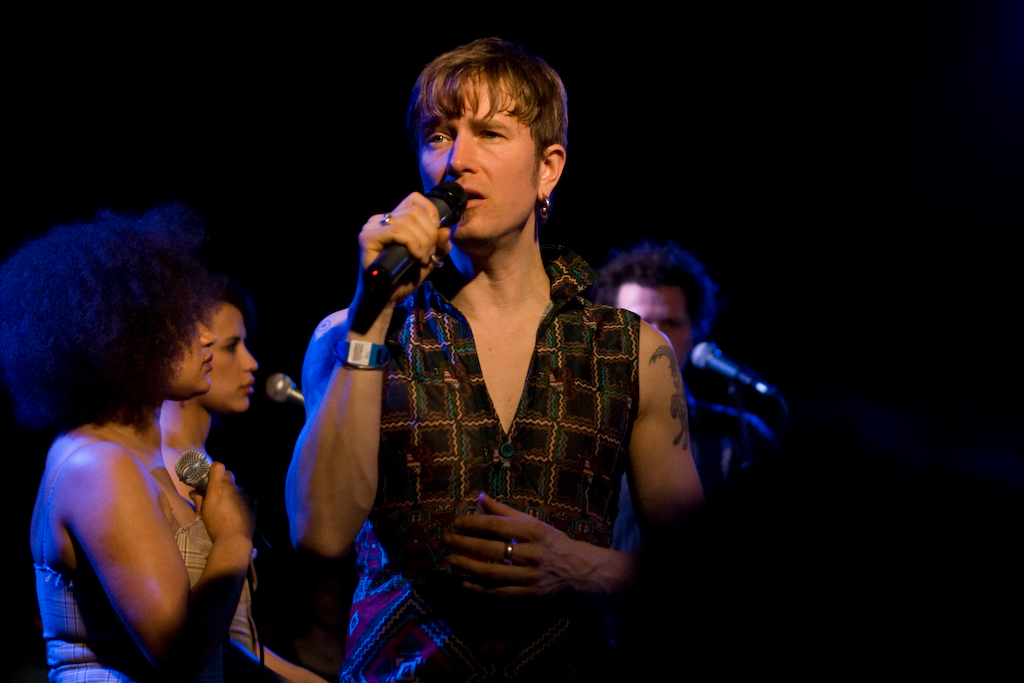

Background information
- Genres: Indie rock, experimental rock
- Occupations: Singer, songwriter, guitarist, sculptor, painter, record producer

Stef Kamil Carlens (27 September 1970) is a singer-songwriter, musician, composer, and record producer.

Carlens is the leader of Belgian indie band Zita Swoon (previously known with the names A Beatband and Moondog Jr.). The band gradually changed into the polymorphic collective Zita Swoon Group. Prior to Zita Swoon, he played with dEUS as bassist and singer, before leaving in 1997 to concentrate on his own band.

Carlens is also a visual artist.
