= Evil Superstars =

Belgian indie rock band

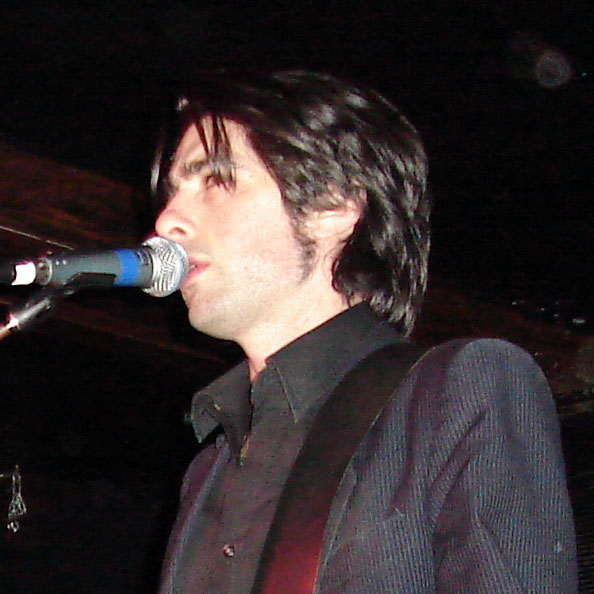
- Mauro Pawlowski - vocalist and guitarist

Background information
- Origin: Heusden-Zolder, Belgium
- Genres: Indie rock, Alternative rock
- Years active: 1992–1998
- Label: Paradox
- Past members: Mauro Pawlowski; Tim Vanhamel; Dave Schroyen; Marc Requilé; Bart Vandebroek; Johan Van Den Berghe; Bart Vandeput
- Website: Official website

Evil Superstars was a Belgian indie rock band led by Mauro Pawlowski. Among its members was Millionaire and Eagles of Death Metal guitarist Tim Vanhamel.

== History ==
Evil Superstars was formed in 1992 in Heusden-Zolder, Belgium. The original members were:

- Mauro Pawlowski, vocals and guitar
- Marc Requilé, samples and keyboards
- Bart Vandebroek, bass guitar
- Bart Vandeput, drums

Johan Van Den Berghe soon replaced Bart Vandeput on drums.

In March 1994 the band finished first in Humo's Rock Rally contest. Three months later Johan Van Den Berghe left, and was replaced by Dave Schroyen before recording their first EP, Hairfacts (1995). Tim Vanhamel, aged fifteen, joined the band.

In 1996 this line-up recorded their first album Love Is Okay, soon followed by a second EP Remix Apocalyps. The second album Boogie Children-R-US was recorded in 1997, but record company Paradox, an A&M London subsidiary, postponed the official release for a year. Despite favorable reviews, sales were poor. When A&M London fell apart, the band found itself without a record company and Mauro Pawlowski decided to disband the Evil Superstars.

Evil Superstars gave their last concert on September 15, 1998, at the Botanique in Brussels.

== Members ==
- Mauro Pawlowski, vocals and guitar
- Marc Requilé, samples and keyboards
- Bart Vandebroek, bass guitar
- Bart Vandeput, Johan Van Den Berghe, Dave Schroyen, drums
- Tim Vanhamel, guitar

== Gallery ==
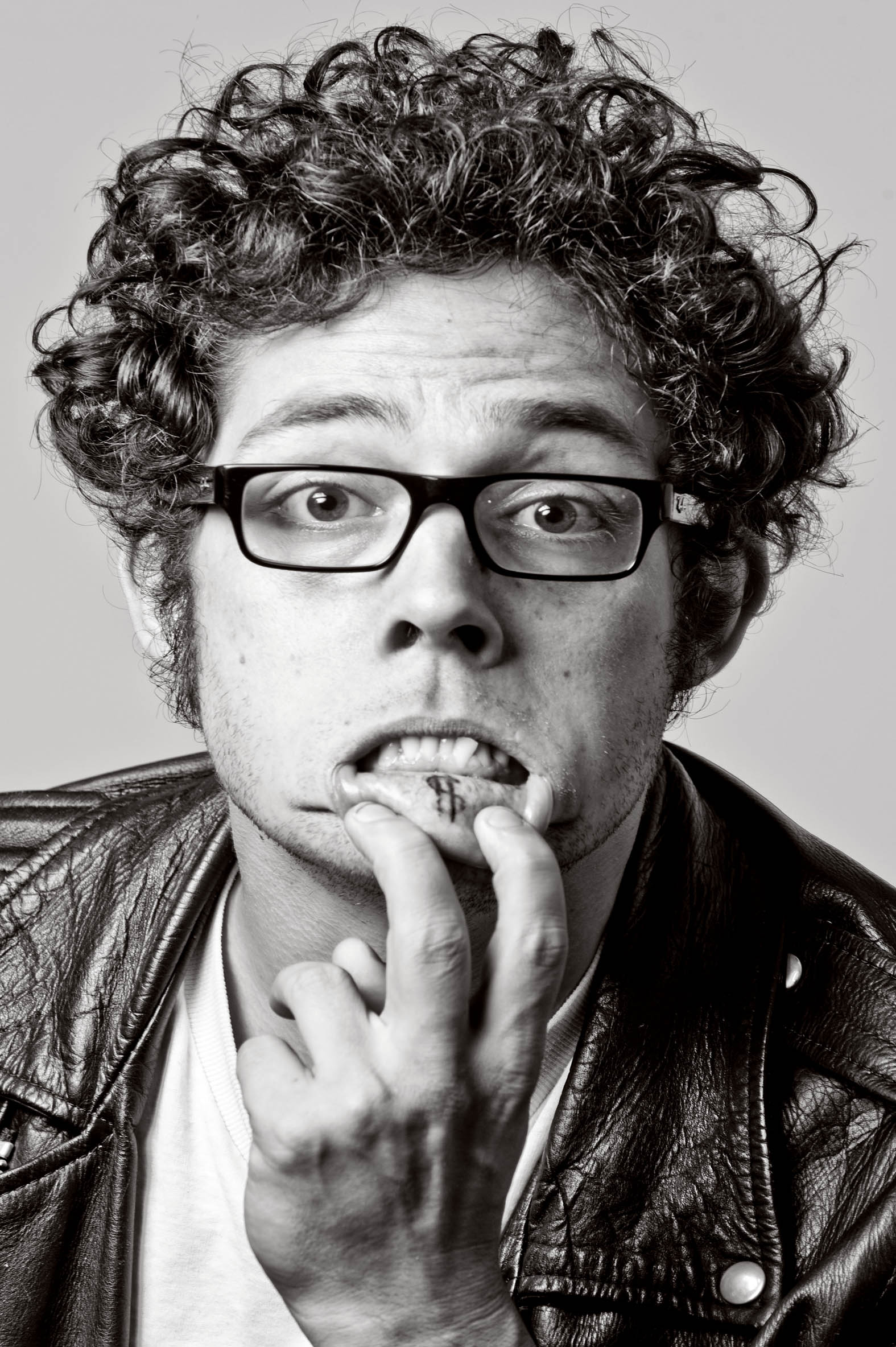
Tim Vanhamel - guitarist

== Discography ==
=== Albums ===
- 1996 : Love Is Okay
- 1998 : Boogie Children-R-Us

=== EPs ===
- 1994 : Hairfacts
- 1996 : Remix apocalyps

=== Singles ===
- 1996 : "Satan is in my ass"
- 1996 : "Pantomiming with her parents"
- 1998 : "B.A.B.Y."
- 1998 : "Sad sad planet"

=== Soundtracks ===
- Oh Girl, from Lock, Stock and Two Smoking Barrels (1998), Guy Ritchie
- Holy Spirit Come Home, from Any Way the Wind Blows (2003), Tom Barman
