= Tom Barman =

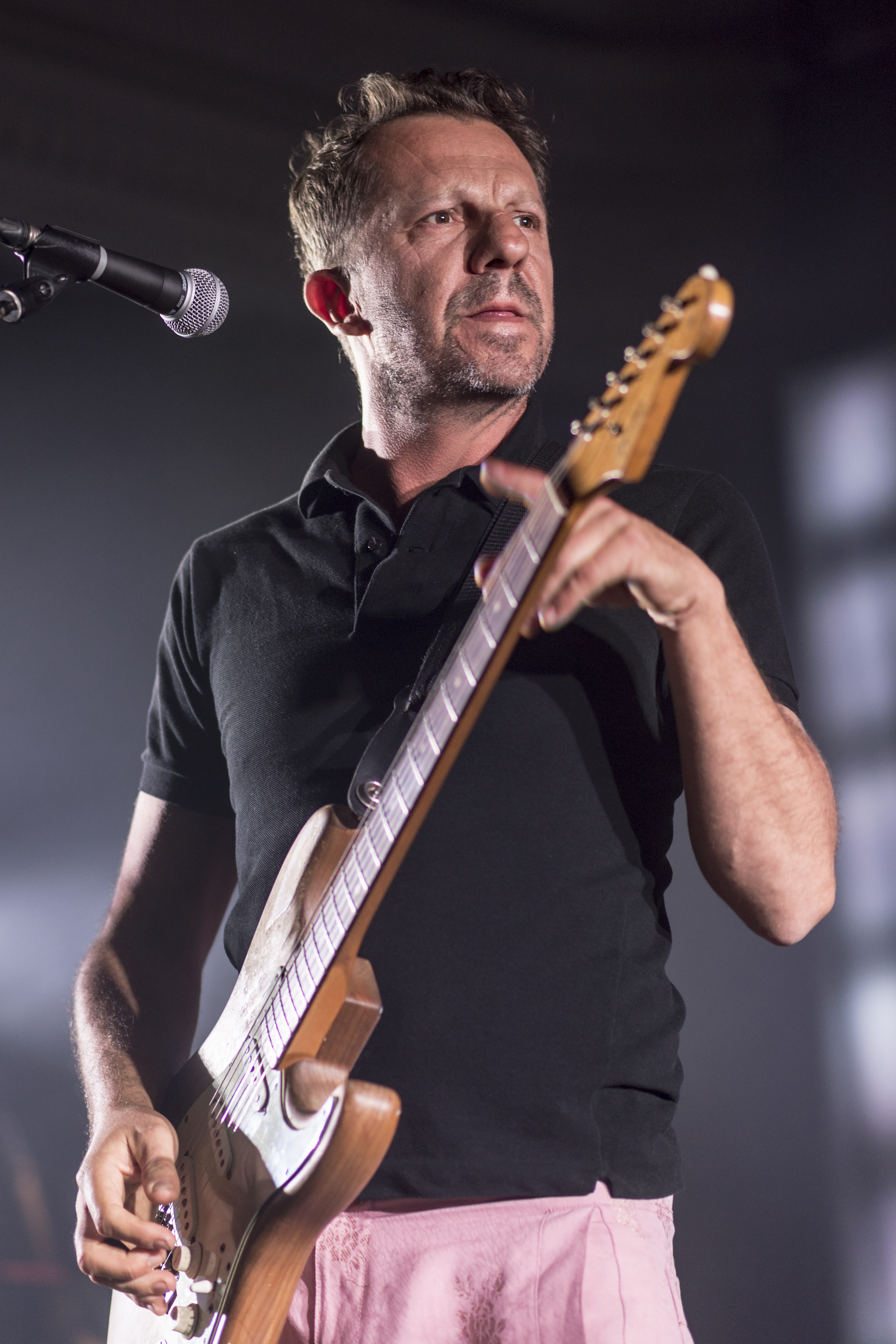
- Tom Barman

Background information
- Born: 1 January 1972 (age 54); Belgium
- Genres: Experimental rock, indie rock, alternative rock
- Occupations: Musician, songwriter, film director
- Instruments: Vocals, guitar
- Years active: 1989–present
- Label: Columbia
- Member of: dEUS, TaxiWars
- Formerly of: Magnus
- Website: https://www.tombarman.net/
- Tom Barman's voice recorded January 2015

Thomas Andrew Barman (born 1 January 1972), is a Belgian musician, film director and photographer.

== Early life and education ==
Barman is of Norwegian descent from his father's side. He started his studies at the Sint-Lukas film school in Brussels, but did not complete them, deciding instead to focus on a career in music.

== Musical career ==
=== dEUS ===
In 1989, Barman formed the rock band dEUS in Antwerp.

In 2008, dEUS released the album Vantage Point. Barman also contributed vocals to Axelle Red's album Sisters & Empathy in 2009.

On September 16, 2011, dEUS released Keep You Close, which was the successor to Vantage Point. On June 1, 2012, dEUS unexpectedly released the album Following Sea.

In 2019, Barman toured Europe with dEUS for The Ideal Crash 20th Anniversary Tour. During this tour, the documentary 'Confessions to dEUS' was produced by Fleur Boonman, with Barman heavily involved in its creation.

=== Other projects and collaborations ===
Live, an album in collaboration with pianist Guy Van Nueten, was released in November 2003. In February 2004, Barman released The Body Gave You Everything, the debut album by Magnus, his dance-oriented project with techno producer CJ Bolland.

In 2006, Barman was one of the driving forces behind the 0110 concerts, a series of concerts in response to a perceived rise in extremism and racism in Belgium.

In 2007, Barman collaborated with The Scene on their album 2007, where he performed the song 'Rigoureus'.

Motivated by an interest in jazz, Barman co-founded the jazz band TaxiWars with Belgian saxophonist Robin Verheyen in 2014. They released their debut album, TaxiWars, in 2015, followed by Fever in 2016. They first performed at Gent Jazz in 2014, followed by appearances at Jazz Middelheim in 2015 and the North Sea Jazz Festival, among others. Barman regularly performs with this four-piece band, and worked on their third album, Artificial Horizon, which was released in 2019.

== Film and photography ==
While his primary focus became music, Barman didn't abandon his filmmaking skills, applying them to direct music videos for dEUS and other Belgian musicians, such as Axelle Red and Hooverphonic.

In 1996, he directed a short film titled Turnpike, featuring Seymour Cassel and Sam Louwyck, which opened for Trainspotting across Europe.

In the summer of 2002 shooting started in Antwerp for his first feature film Any Way the Wind Blows which was released in Belgian cinemas in the summer of 2003.

In 2011, Barman featured in the documentary Tempo of a Restless Soul, directed by Manu Riche and Renaat Lambeets, providing an everyday glimpse into his life. The film, screened at the Ghent Film Festival, received mixed reviews.

Outside of music and film, Barman has a passion for photography. He exhibited his photos for the first time in 2019 at Hof van Cleve and published a photo book titled Hurry up and wait in 2020. Solo exhibitions in Antwerp at the Gert Voorjans gallery in 2020 and at the Galerie Weisbard in Rotterdam in 2022, curated by Hugo Borst, featured his work.

== Recent activities ==
During the COVID-19 pandemic, Barman and dEUS worked on a new album, which was announced in November 2022 to be released in February 2023. The first single, Must Have Been New, was released prior to the album. Concurrently, Barman wrote the screenplay for a new film. On February 17, 2023, dEUS released their eighth album How to replace it, for which Barman provided the cover image. The band's European tour began on March 14, 2023 with the first of four concerts at the AB in Brussels.
