= Rock music in Belgium =

Belgian musical scene

Belgian rock refers to rock music produced in Belgium or written and performed by Belgian musicians. It was originally inspired by rock and roll music from America and the United Kingdom in the 1960s, but later evolved to be influenced by other genres including alternative rock and electronic music. Because Belgium is a federal state with strong cultural identities - a French-speaking area in the southern region of Wallonia as well as a Dutch-speaking population in the north region of Flanders - Belgian rock music uses these two national languages, as well as the English language.

The history of Belgian rock echoes that of European rock: after the 1950s, during which rock pioneers introduced the new genre, rock evolved further under the influences of beat music and pop music. During the 1970s, hard rock and progressive rock expressed new forms of rock, and punk rock signalled a return to the simplicity of rock and roll with Belgian bands like The Kids, Red Zebra, and Hubble Bubble. During the 1980s and 90s, indie rock and alternative rock developed with an important scene in Antwerp; Deus was a particularly successful band from the Antwerp alternative scene.

== History ==
=== 1955-1963: The introduction of rock and roll to Belgium ===
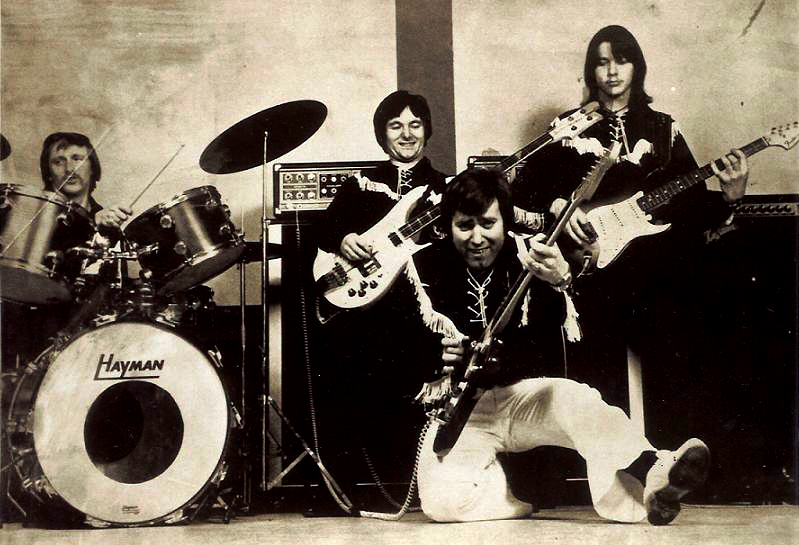
Burt Blanca in 1978.

In Belgium, as in Europe in general, rock and roll began to spread at the end of the 1950s, in part due to the presence of American troops stationed in Europe in the post-war period. Among the first rock and roll songs to arrive in Belgium was Rock Around the Clock (Decca, 1954) by Bill Haley & His Comets. In 1956 the film of the same name was released in Belgium, which kicked off a rock and roll craze. Among the new pioneers of rock in Belgium there were Rocking Harry and Shorty Lee Smith and the Wildcats who began playing between 1956 and 1957. In issue 25 of the newly formed music magazine Juke Box the first concert of Bill Haley & His Comets at the Palais des Beaux-Arts in Brussels was announced on October 30, 1958. In 1959, Burt Blanca and the King Creoles released their "Oh, Carol! / I Love You So" (Hebra Records), Big Brown & The Gamblers followed this hit with "My Testament" (Palette, 1961), Clark Richard and his Tropical Stars released "Queen Of Love / Hot Rock Beat" (His Master's Voice, 1961) and Les Frangins released "Ye Youpi / Changhai" (Barclay, 1961).

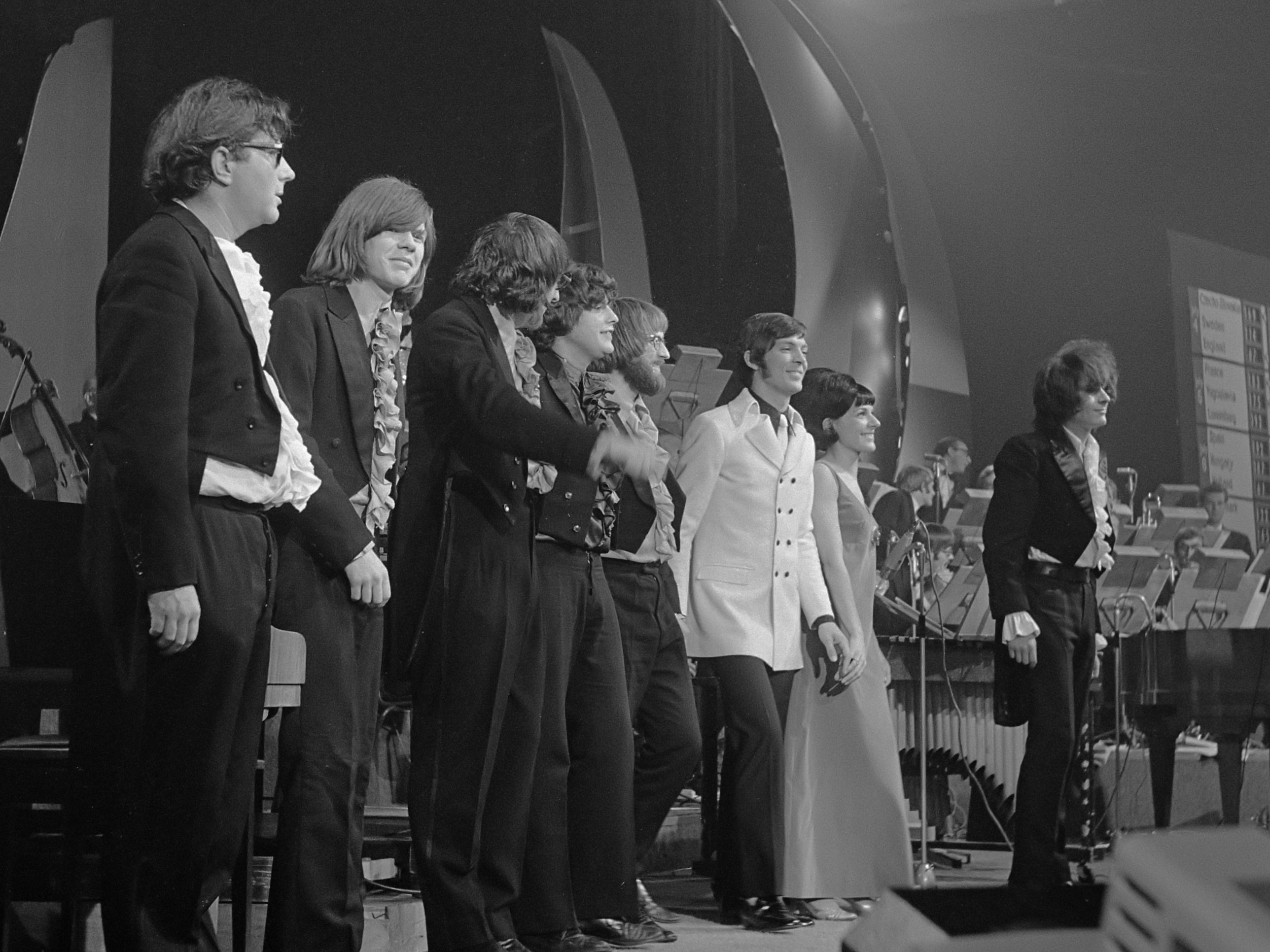
Wallace Collection (1969)

Surf music and instrumental rock were influential for early Belgian rock music, brought to Belgium by UK bands like The Shadows. In 1957, the Belgian band The Jokers published their first 7" entitled "Drie Dagen En Drie Nachten" (CID). This was followed by the remake of the Belgian folk song Ik zag Cecilia komen with the new title Cecilia Rock (Philips, 1960). Among the many songs by the Jokers that later achieved popular success in Belgium were Ronny Boy (Discostar, 1963), Tabou (Discostar, 1964), and Gemini Boogie (Arcade Records, 1965). An instrumental rock band, The Cousins, released a rock version of the folk song Kili Watch (Palette, 1960).

Other important releases of this period include the Shakespears ("Shake it over", 1965), the Pebbles ("Seven horses in the sky", 1968), and the Wallace Collection ("Daydream", 1969). Other notable artists got evolved in the rock scene, including blues and folk musicians like the Antwerps protest singer Ferre Grignard who released the songs Ring Ring and Drunken Sailor in 1966.

=== Post-British Invasion developments in the 1960s ===
==== Between Rhythm & Blues, Beat, and Garage rock ====
In the mid-1960s, as a result of the British Invasion, Belgian bands began to create a homegrown version of garage rock. The beat band The Pebbles were one of the most iconic bands of this movement. In 1965, they released a series of 7" singles -- Let's Say Goodbye / Love Me Again (CBS), Love Me Again / It's Alright With Me Now (Dot Records), It's Allright With Me / Forever More (CBS), and Huma - La La La La (Président) -- which were also popular in Spain, France, and Italy. The Pebbles performed on the Dutch TV show Fenklup on June 7, 1968.

In 1965 Les Godasses Verte released the 7" La Salade / Le Panier A Salade (CBS). Les Night Rockers released En Public Du Golf Drouot (Golf Drouot), I Can Tell (Barclay, 1965), and Dance To The Rock (Golf Drouot, 1966). The band Sylvester's Team released It Reminds Me (Louis XVI) (Roover Records, 1965) and Beautiful Day / Hurt Me No More (Roover Records, 1966). In 1968 they changed their name to Bird and the Bees and released their 7" Tiger Dans (Disques Vogue).

Born from the offshoot of the Belgian rock band Les Ombres, a band named The Klan released a series of singles and an album entitled Join Us (Palette, 1967); The Klan opened for the Rolling Stones at their Paris concert on April 10, 1967.

==== Psychedelic rock ====
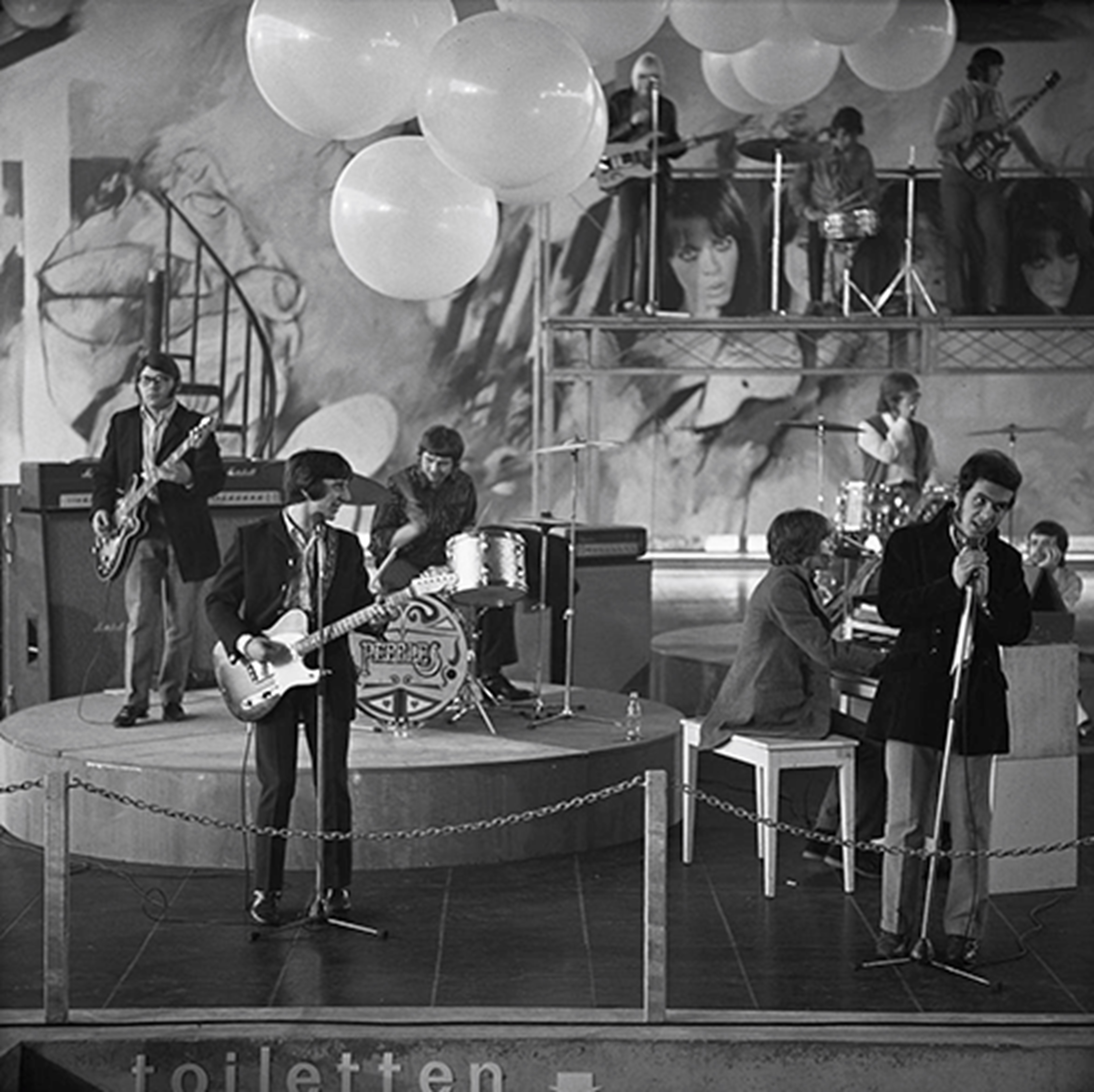
The Pebbles (Dutch TV, 1968)

For Belgium, 1967 was also the year in which the new psychedelic rock developed, as evidenced by The Pebbles 7" release I Got To Sing / You're Better Believe It (Barclay, 1967), their single Seven Horses In The Sky (Barclay, 1968), and their self-titled album (1969). The band shared the stage with Jimi Hendrix and with the Small Faces in a concert in Paris. In 1967, The Shakes began to develop a blues sound with strong psychedelic influences, clearly seen in Come On-A My House / Dust My Blues (Voom) and Shoot Me Baby / You've Got To Hide Your Love Away (Ronnex Records, 1968). Waterloo released the 7" Meet Again (Disques Vogue) in 1969 and Plastic Mind (Disques Vogue) in 1970. The same year, Paul's Collection released Man / Music Is My Life (RCA, 1970) followed by four 7" singles.

=== The new subgenres of the 70s ===
==== Progressive rock ====
Indie rock bands like TC Matic and De Kreuners, and many punk rock-dark wave bands like Nacht und Nebel, the Paranoiacs and Siglo XX, began to draw a significant audience, and started to release songs in their mother language. Some, like the eurorock band Machiavel and the pop/punk singer Plastic Bertrand, were also managed in a more commercial approach.

Among the notable bands with a strong jazz rock influences are the Cos and the Kandahar. The Cos debuted in 1973 with the album Postaeolian Train Robbery (Plus Records, 1974). The Kandahar debuted with the 7" single Survivin' Boogie / The Dark Hole Rag (Dwarf, 1974) and then released their first album In The Court Of Catherina Squeezer (Dwarf, 1975). The Esperanto Rock Orchestra achieved international fame with a self-titled album released by A&M Records. Other notable bands include Tideline, Magenta, Machiavel, the Isopoda, the Nessie, the Phylter, the Flyte, and the Dragon. The symphonic prog rock band, Banzai released Hora Nata in 1974 on the Dutch label Delta.

==== Hard & heavy ====
At the end of the 1960s, a hard rock / heavy metal style of rock emerged that was characterized by a dense, powerful sound, with rhythmic bass lines in the foreground, highly amplified distortion, guitar solos, emphatic rhythms, and an overall high volume. Among the pioneer bands of this genre in Belgium are Jenghiz Khan who released the seminal album Well Cut (Barclay). In 1971, Irish Coffee released a single entitled Carry On / Child (Triangle) and then a self-titled album in the same year.

=== Proto-punk, punk and new wave ===
==== Punk rock ====
The Belgian rock scene spawned many proto-punk and glam rock bands including Vacation who released the singles I Can't Bear Pain (Sandro, 1975) and Whatch What You Do (Sandro, 1977). Another example of proto-punk in Belgium is the band Blast who released the 7" Damned Flame / Hope (Majestic, 1974). Beginning in 1976-77 a national punk rock scene began in Belgium. One of the first punk bands in Belgium were The Kids, who were founded in 1976, and released the single 7" No Monarchy / Rock Over Belgium / The City Is Dead in 1978; later that year they released the albums The Kids (Fontana, 1978) and Naughty kids (Fontana, 1978). Other bands of the first Belgian punk rock wave include Red Zebra, Hubble Bubble, Plastic Bertrand, The Employees, and Perverted by Desire.

==== New wave ====
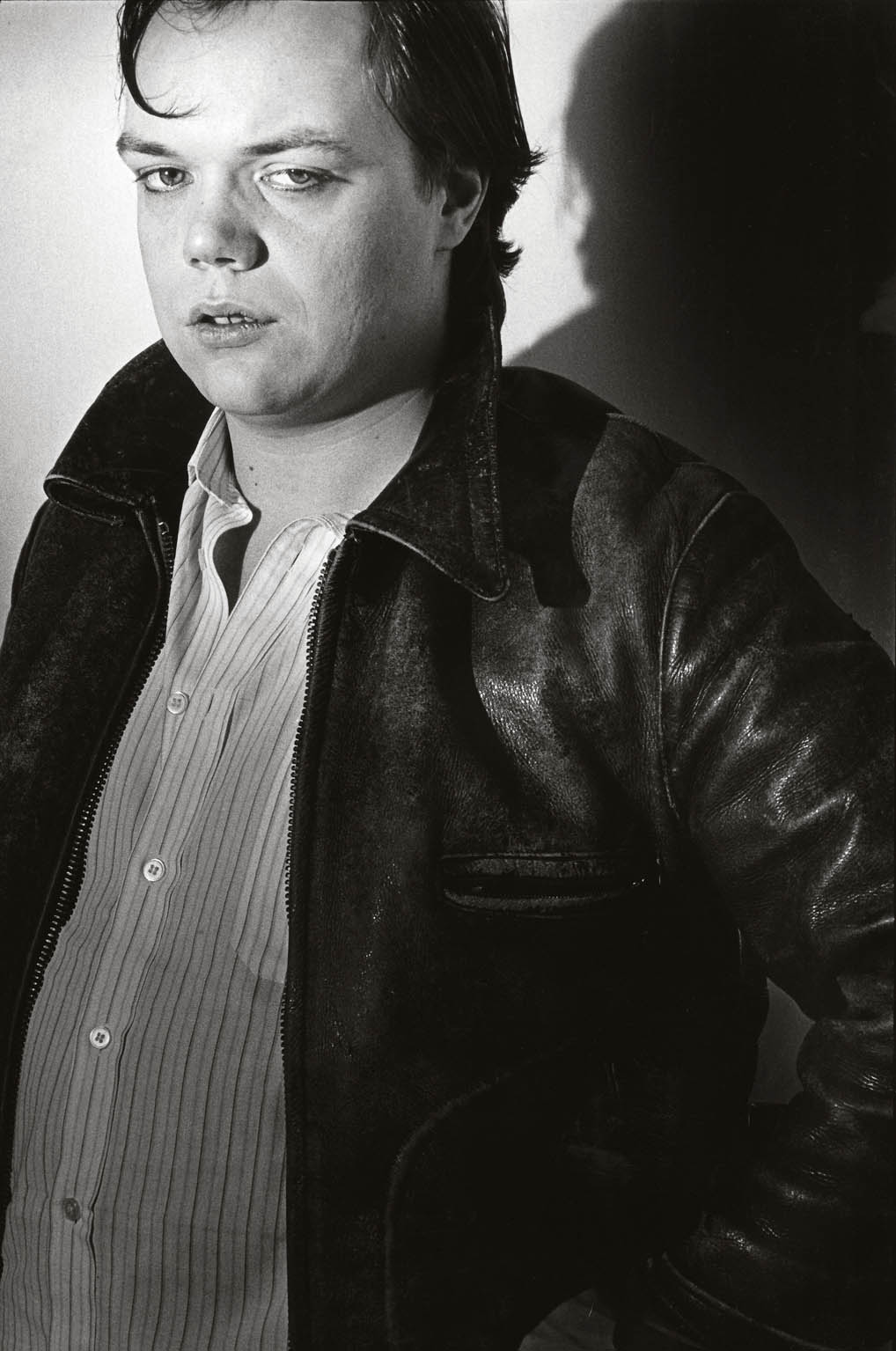
Patrick Nebel of Nacht und Nebel in 1985

Among the Belgian new wave bands that emerged following the first wave of punk were pop bands like TC Matic of the singer Arno, De Kreuners, The Bowling Balls, Nacht und Nebel and Walter Verdin. New wave also included electronic rock bands like Telex, as well as bands inspired by songwriting like Rick Tubbax And The Taxi's, and Bubblegum pop artists like Lio. This period also included funk wave bands like Allez Allez and 2 Belgen.

==== Post-punk ====
Following the first wave of punk, more politically motivated post-punk bands emerged. These bands tended to have a harder sound than new wave bands, or adopted darker formulas and often linked to countercultures. Examples of post-punk in Belgium include Aroma Di Amore, Lavvi Ebbel, De Brassers, Siglo XX, A Noh Rodeo, Company of State, Mensen Blaffen, The Names, Jo Lemaire + Flouze, The Breath of Life, and Poésie Noire.

=== The rock of the 80s and 90s ===
==== Synth rock ====
Many of the progressive rock bands of the 70s carried out their first experiments with synthesizers. But it was in the late '70s that many bands began to develop a Synth pop and Synth rock sound. Among these, the most successful Belgian band was Machiavel, which was categorized at the time as Eu-rock.

==== Cold wave ====
The origins of cold wave lie in the first wave punk bands of France and Belgium; this distinctive post-punk sound was the result of these bands' use of cheap portable synthesizers. Coldwave bands often mixed Darkwave sounds with German-style Krautrock electronics, obtaining often cold and minimal sound results. The bands in this genre include Aimless Device, Parade Ground, Siglo XX, and Poésie Noire.

==== Gothic rock ====
From the darker side of the post-punk scene of the late '70s, between coldwave, darkwave and industrial music, an autonomous scene of gothic rock with its own subculture grew in popularity in the 1980s. Among the Belgian bands that contributed to this scene were The Breath of Life, Siglo XX, De Brassers, The Names, and Poésie Noire.

==== Electronic body music ====
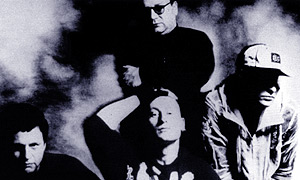
I Front 242

Belgium played a fundamental role in the development of electronic body music (EBM), a musical genre of post music -industrial which mixed among other things industrial music, electronic music, dance music and Synthpunk. Among the synthesizers that defined the style in its early phase were the Korg MS-20, the Roland SH-101, the ARP Odyssey, the Emulator II, along with several Oberheim and Yamaha models. The most important bands of early Belgian EBM were Front 242, Klinik and The Neon Judgement.

=== Indie rock ===
With the emergence of new beat in the 1990s, Belgium, especially Flanders, experienced a profound turning point in electronic music. As a reaction to the mainstream attitude of the new beat scene, an alternative rock and indie rock scene developed, along with a series of festivals, often put on by local youth organizations. The festival Humo's Rock Rally became particularly prominent. Although "Radio 21" was created in 1981 (two years prior to its Flemish counterpart Studio Brussel), the Dour Festival has only turned into a resolutely indie festival in the middle of the nineties.

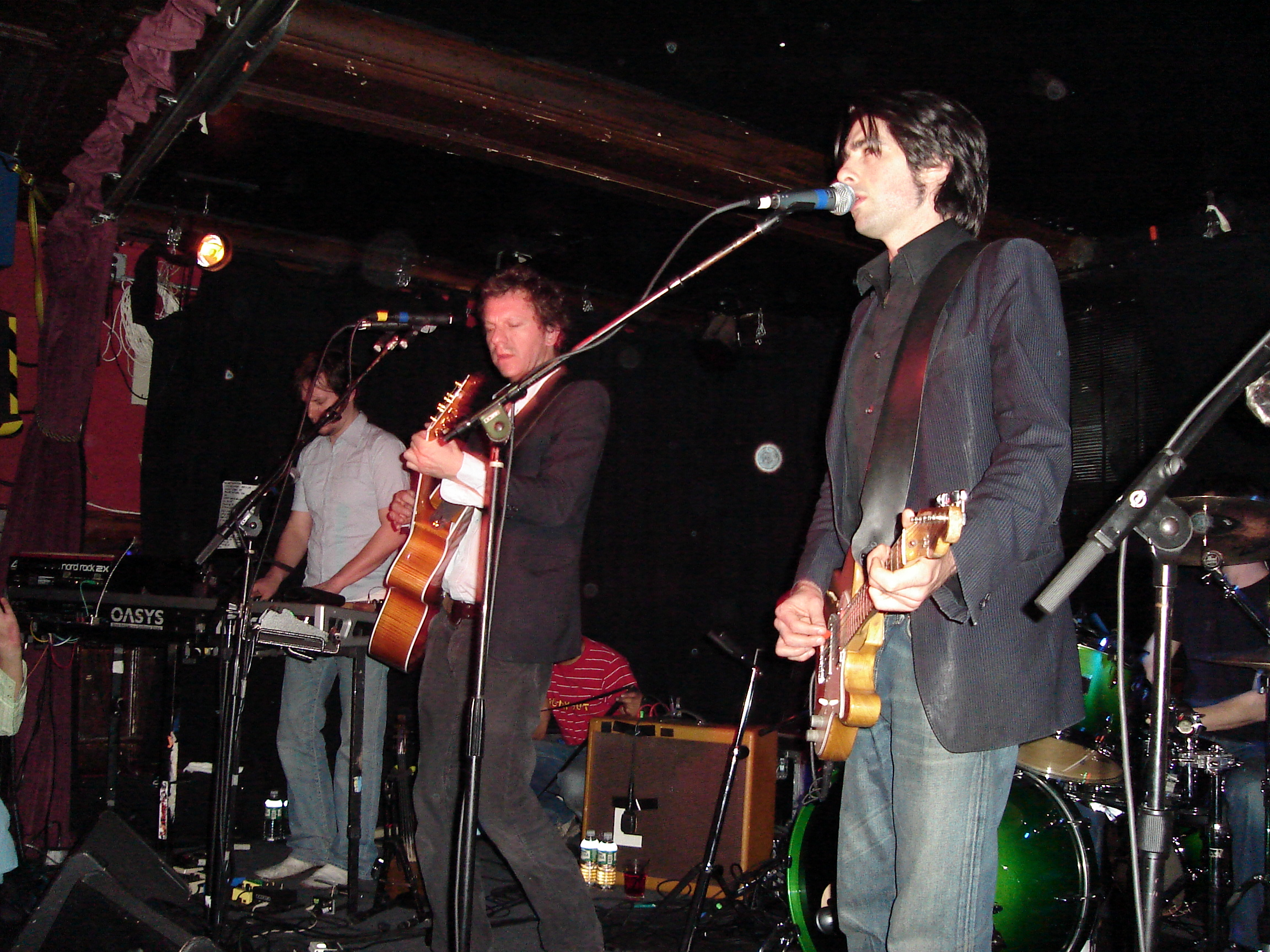
dEUS, an alternative band from Antwerp, playing at Cafe Du Nord in San Francisco in March 2006

A particularly rich indie rock scene emerged in Antwerp, where dEUS became a highly successful band. Mauro Pawlowski and Rudy Trouvé, members of dEUS, are key figures of the Antwerp scene. Pawlowski has played in numerous bands, including Mitsoobishy Jacson, Kiss My Jazz, Shadowgraphic City, The Love Substitutes, Othin Sake, The Parallels, Club Moral, Archetipi of the MultiSabanas, I Hate Camera, and Evil Superstars, as well as pursuing a solo career. Trouvé played with Dead Man Ray, Gore Slut, I Hate Camera, Kiss My Jazz, The Love Substitutes, Rudy Trouvé Sextet/Settet, Rudy and the Unforgettable Wally's. Other well-known indie rock bands from Antwerp include Zita Swoon, Dead Man Ray, K's Choice, Admiral Freebee, A Brand, and Die Anarchistische Abendunterhaltung.

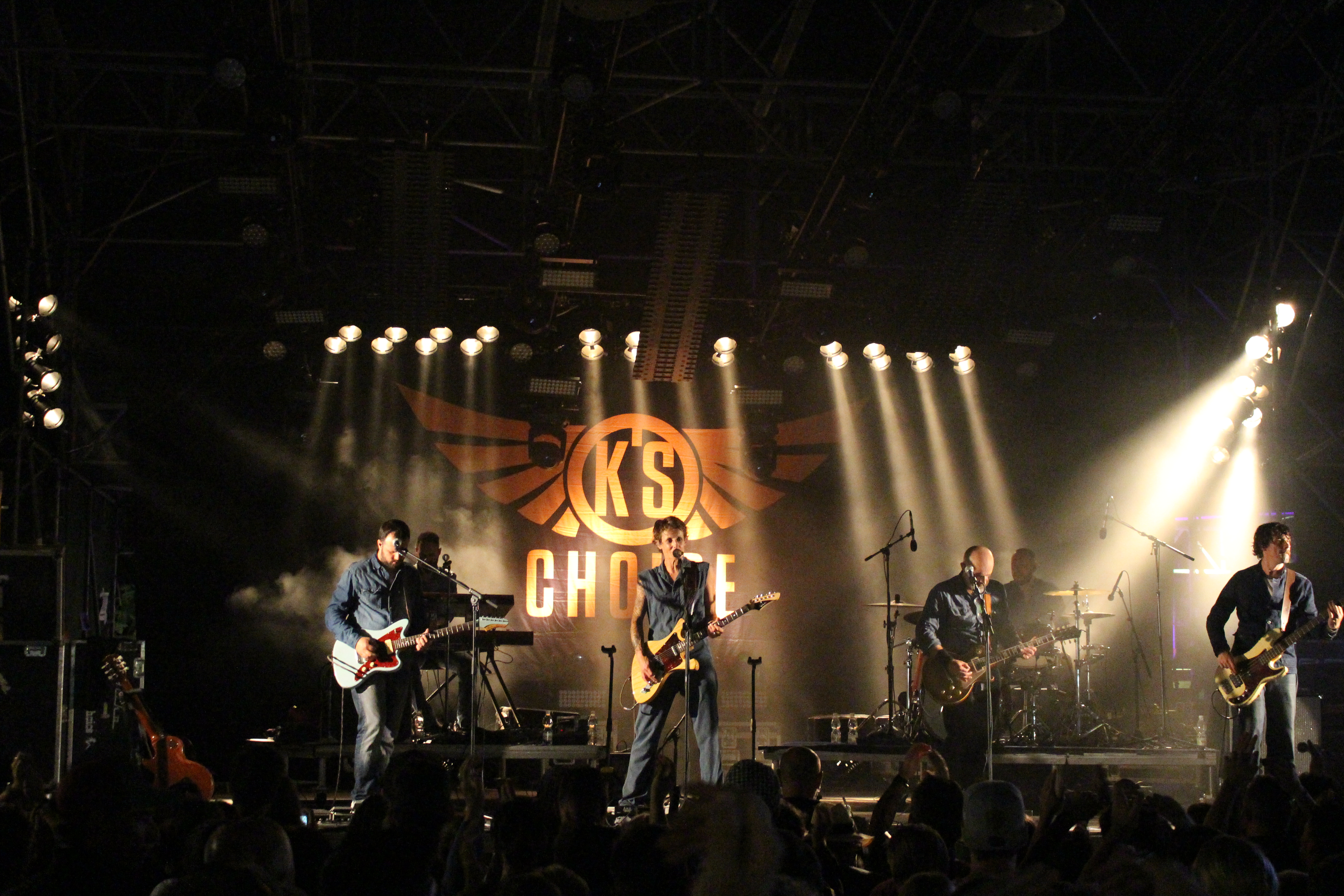
K's Choice - Picture On Festival 2016

The indie rock scene spread throughout Belgium. Notable musicians and groups in Belgian indie rock include Zita Swoon, Noordkaap, Venus, Sharko, Dead Man Ray, Admiral Freebee, A Brand, Die Anarchistische Abendunterhaltung, Gorki, Millionaire, Soulwax, An Pierlé, The Black Box Revelation, Novastar, Milow, Arid, An Pierlé, Das Pop, Admiral Freebee, Goose, Ozark Henry, and Hooverphonic.

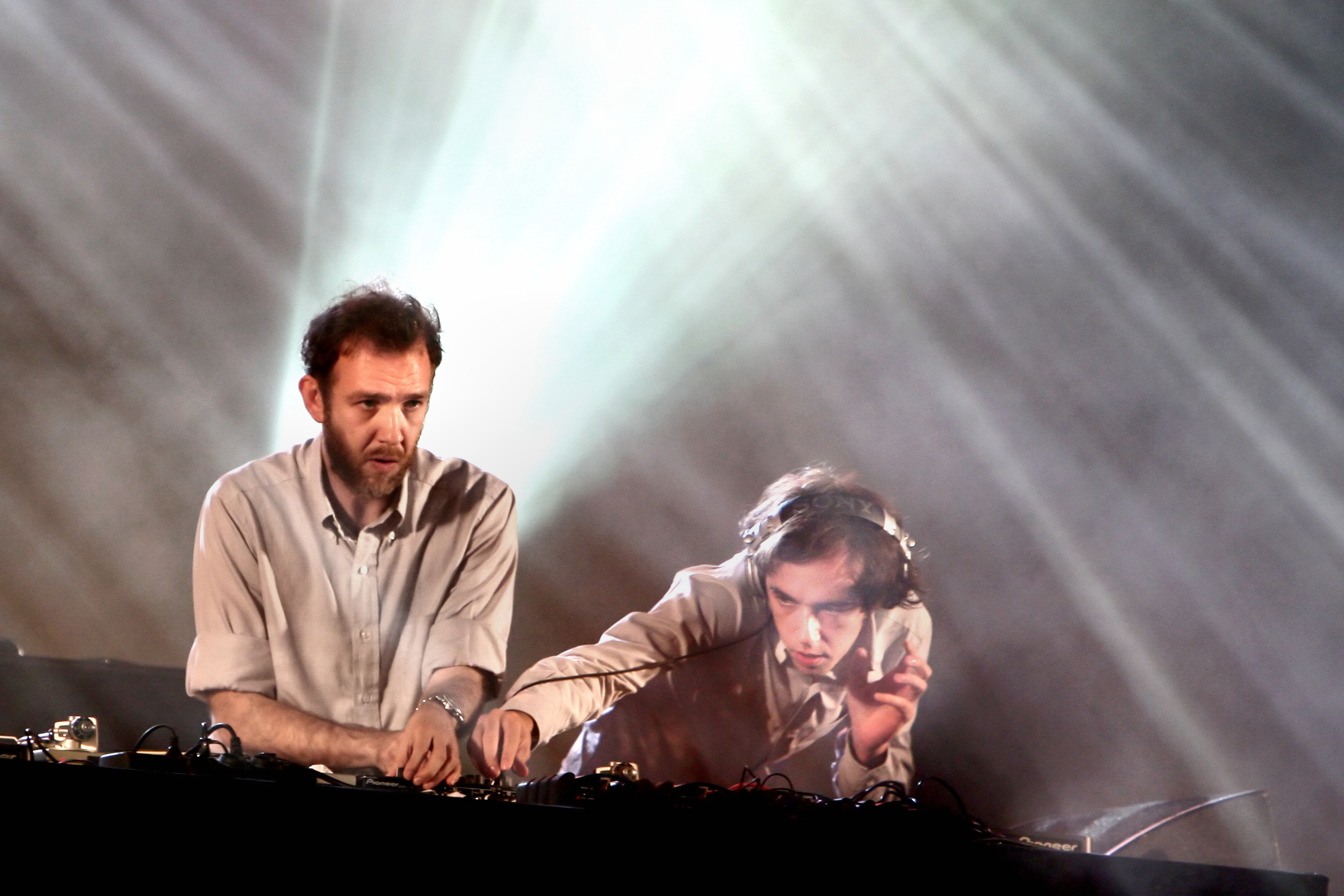
The electronic band Soulwax performing at Rock en Seine in August 2007.

In 1981, the pioneer noise band Club Moral formed in Antwerp.

As in most northern Europe countries, the hard rock-metal scene was maturing. In Belgium its first iconic groups were Kleptomania and Irish Coffee. In the 1990s, the metal band Channel Zero achieved wide success.

=== From 2000 onwards ===
The 2000s mark the arrival of a new uninhibited Belgian (mainly French) scene started by Venus, and then by Girls in Hawaii, Ghinzu, The Telrs, Hollywood Porn Stars, and Sharko. Other notable Belgian bands active during this period include Arid, Vive la Fête, Triggerfinger, and Absynthe Minded.

== Belgian bands and artists ==
- List of Belgian bands and artists

== Literature ==
Jelot-Blanc, Jean-Jacques (2017). Camion Blanc: Le tour du rock en 80 mots Rock around the world (in French). Paris: Camion Blanc. ISBN 978-2-35779-976-9.
