= Thierry Plas =

Belgian guitarist

Thierry Patrick Plas (born 1959) is a Belgian guitarist, first known as lead guitarist and co-songwriter for the Belgian rock group Machiavel. Since 1992, Plas composes and produces also soundtracks for the film and advertising industry at ZOO Productions Company.

== Biography ==
At the age of 21, he joined Machiavel at a time when the band was going through fundamental (personnel) changes, and looking for a new direction. This led to more of a hard rock sound, combined with greater maturity and simplicity, culminating in the hit single "Fly" from their 1980 album "New Lines". In the 1990s, Thierry Plas became a highly appreciated session musician, playing live and recording with Vaya Con Dios, Vladimir Cosma, Pierre Rapsat, Beverly Jo Scott, Billy Preston and other Belgian, French & international artists.

Plas was also a member of The Responsibles with Patrick Riguelle who released one album, "Every Germ is Sacred" (1995) and were chosen as the opening act for Jimmy Page & Robert Plant in Brussels, Rotterdam and Köln.

In 2000, Plas and Marc Ysaye (of Machiavel) teamed up again to record the Purple Prose album with Dani Klein, and in 2004 Thierry did arrangements & guitars for several tracks on the album of Vaya Con Dios "The Promise". Under the pseudonym "Michel Vaillant", he also participated in several hip-hop successes. Other production credits over the years have included Belgium's 1988 Eurovision candidate Joseph Reynaerts, Brandthout, Klaus Klang and Raxola.
