= Irish Coffee (disambiguation) =

Irish coffee is a cocktail.

Irish Coffee may also refer to:

- Irish Coffee (band), a Belgian hard rock band
- Irish Coffee (TV series), a Canadian talk show
