= The Promise (Vaya Con Dios album) =

Studio album by Vaya Con Dios
- Released: 2004
- Recorded: Dada Studios, Magnet Studio and Zoo Studio. Mixed at Dada Studios and Magnet Studio.
- Genre: Soft rock Easy Listening
- Label: Play It Again Sam, Altermundo
- Producer: Jean-Pol Van Ham

Vaya Con Dios chronology
Roots and Wings (1995)	The Promise (2004)	Comme on est venu... (2009)

The Promise is the fifth studio album by Vaya Con Dios. It was released in 2004, the first studio album of the band since 1995. It is the first (and only) Vaya Con Dios album with songs in Spanish and German. "Es wird schon wieder gehen" had been previously sung on the Purple Prose album.

== Track listing ==
No.	Title	Writer(s)	Length
1.	"No One Can Make You Stay"	Dani Klein and Jean-Pol Van Ham	4:05
2.	"Ain't No Love In The Heart Of The City"	Dan Walsh and Michael Price	3:08
3.	"Don't Deny"	Bertil André, Dani Klein, Gary Richmond and Jean-Pol Van Ham	3:28
4.	"La Llorona" (Traditional, Arranged by Bertil André and Jean-Pol Van Ham)		4:19
5.	"Take Heed"	Norman W. Grant	3:51
6.	"Je l'aime je l'aime" (Arranged by Jean-Pol Van Ham and Thierry Plas)	Dani Klein, Traditional	2:51
7.	"The Promise"	Bertil André, Dani Klein and Jean-Pol Van Ham	3:19
8.	"Ilia" (feat. Bonga, Arranged by Jean-Pol Van Ham and Thierry Plas)	Bonga and Dani Klein, Traditional	4:17
9.	"La Vida Es Como Una Rosa"	Bertil André, Dani Klein, Frank Llanes Brutis and Jean-Pol Van Ham	3:03
10.	"Es wird schon wieder gehen"	Bertil André, Dani Klein, Jean-Pol Van Ham, Niklaus Reiser and Suzanne Strub	3:34
11.	"How We Lose (How We Win)"	Dani Klein, Jean-Pol Van Ham and Monday Justice	3:20
12.	"Je te veux" (feat. Grim, Lyrics by Henry Pacory, Music by Erik Satie)		3:10

== Charts ==
Chart (1990)	Peak position
Swiss Albums Chart	67
French Albums Chart	172
Dutch Album Top 100	96
Belgian (Flanders) Ultratop 50	12
Belgian (Wallonia) Ultratop 50	73
Finland Albums Chart	32
