= Don't Break My Heart (Vaya Con Dios song) =

Single by Vaya Con Dios

from the album Roots and Wings
- B-side: "Movin' On"
- Released: 1995
- Genre: Soft rock
- Length: 3:44
- Label: Ariola
- Songwriter(s): Dani Klein; James T. Slater; Luc Weisser; Willy Lambregt
- Producer(s): Philippe Allaert

Vaya Con Dios singles chronology
"So Long Ago" (1993)	"Don't Break My Heart" (1995)	"Stay with Me" (1996)

Music video
- "Don't Break My Heart" on YouTube

"Don't Break My Heart" is a song by the Belgian band Vaya Con Dios, released in 1995 by Ariola as the first single from their fourth studio album, Roots and Wings (1995). It was written by Dani Klein, James T. Slater, Luc Weisser and Willy Lambregt, and produced by Philippe Allaert. The single peaked at number six on the Belgian singles chart.

== Critical reception ==
A reviewer from Music & Media wrote, "Time after time Dani Klein manages to deliver. Grand café soul from Brussels is hard for radio to decline as it adds that moment of classy rest needed in today's hectic programming."

== Track listings ==
1. "Don't Break My Heart" (single version) (3:44)
2. "Movin' On" (3:30)
  Written by Cyril Orcel and Dani Klein

== Credits ==
- Written by Dani Klein, James T. Slater, Luc Weisser and Willy Lambregt
- Produced by Philippe Allaert

== Charts ==
Chart (1990)	Peak position
Netherlands (Single Top 100)	28
Belgium (Ultratop 50 Flanders)	6
Belgium (Ultratop 50 Wallonia)	8
