= What's a Woman? =

Single by Vaya Con Dios

from the album Night Owls
- B-side: "Far Gone Now"
- Released: 30 October 1990
- Recorded: 1989
- Genre: Pop soul, soul blues
- Length: 3:56
- Label: Ariola
- Songwriters: Dani Klein, Jean-Michel Gielen, Dirk Schoufs
- Producers: Dani Klein, Dirk Schoufs

Vaya Con Dios singles chronology
"Nah neh nah" (1990)	"What's a Woman?" (1990)	"Night Owls" (1990)

"What's a Woman?" is a 1990 pop-rock song recorded by Belgian band Vaya Con Dios. It was the second single from band's second studio album, Night Owls (1990). It achieved success in many European countries, topping the chart in the Netherlands, and becoming a top-five hit for three weeks in France. To date, it is Vaya Con Dios' most successful song.

In 2006, the band re-recorded the song as a duet with Aaron Neville, available on its best-of The Ultimate Collection. About this version by Neville, Dani Klein said in an interview : "We were discussing the whole project at Sony BMG and they asked me "Who would you like to do a duet with?" The first person that came into my mind was Aaron Neville, because I'd seen him a few months ago here in Brussels and I was just amazed at his voice! This man has a unique voice... his voice is incomparable. The song goes "What's a woman if a man doesn't treat her right?" And the fact that a man sings that gives it another dimension. I thought that was interesting."

The song is featured in the Swedish movie Vingar av Glas (Wings of Glass), starring Alexander Skarsgård.

== Critical reception ==
A review in pan-European magazine Music & Media elected "What's a Woman?" "Single of the week", stated that it "confirms that this duo are world class roots revivalists", adding that it "recalls late 60s Fax and Motown. A slow, blues rhythm, a big, fat brass sound and a vocal performance per excellence by Dani Klein add up to what should be one of the major hits of this summer".

== Track listings ==
These are the formats and track listings of major single releases of "What's a Woman?".

- 7" single
1. "What's a Woman?" – 3:56
2. "Far Gone Now" – 3:08
- CD maxi
1. "What's A Woman?" – 3:56
2. "Far Gone Now" – 3:08
3. "I Sold My Soul" – 4:56

== Credits ==
- Written by Dani Klein, Dirk Schoufs and Jean-Michel Gielen
- Arranged by Dirk Schoufs and Jean-Michel Gielen
- Artwork by Label & Labeat
- Photography by Roger Dijckmans
- Produced by Dani Klein and Dirk Schoufs

== Charts ==
=== Weekly charts ===
Weekly chart performance for "What's a Woman?"
Chart (1990)	Peak position
Austria (Ö3 Austria Top 40)	7
Belgium (Ultratop 50 Flanders)	1
Europe (Eurochart Hot 100)	28
Finland (Suomen virallinen lista)	14
France (SNEP)	5
Germany (GfK)	11
Netherlands (Dutch Top 40)	1
Netherlands (Single Top 100)	1
Switzerland (Schweizer Hitparade)	6

=== Year-end charts ===
1990 year-end chart performance for "What's a Woman?"
Chart (1990)	Position
Austria (Ö3 Austria Top 40)	8
Belgium (Ultratop)	1
Europe (Eurochart Hot 100)	47
Germany (Media Control)	55
Netherlands (Dutch Top 40)	5
Netherlands (Single Top 100)	7
Switzerland (Schweizer Hitparade)	7

=== Decade-end charts ===
Decade-end chart performance for "What's a Woman?"
Chart (1990–1999)	Position
Austria (Ö3 Austria Top 40)	32
Belgium (Ultratop 50 Flanders)	23

== Certifications ==
Certifications and sales for "What's a Woman?"
Region	Certification	Certified units/sales
Austria (IFPI Austria)	Gold	25,000^{*}
Netherlands (NVPI)	Gold	75,000^{^}
^{*} Sales figures based on certification alone.^{^} Shipments figures based on certification alone.
