= Roots and Wings (Vaya Con Dios album) =

Studio album by Vaya Con Dios
- Released: December 13, 1995
- Genre: Soft rock, modern electric blues
- Length: 47:35
- Label: Ariola Records
- Producer: Philippe Allaert, Dani Klein

Vaya Con Dios chronology
Time Flies (1992)	Roots and Wings (1995)	The Promise (2004)

Roots and Wings is the fourth studio album by the Belgian one woman band Vaya Con Dios, released in 1995.

== Track listing ==
No.	Title	Length
1.	"Lonely Feeling" (also released as a single)	4:04
2.	"Stay With Me" (also released as a single)	3:42
3.	"Hot August Night"	3:46
4.	"Don't Break My Heart" (also released as a single)	4:25
5.	"Mind on Vacation"	3:52
6.	"Call on Me"	4:25
7.	"What If?"	4:05
8.	"Evening of Love"	3:46
9.	"Paradise"	3:23
10.	"Get to You"	3:53
11.	"Don't Hate You Anymore"	4:39
12.	"Movin' On"	3:30

== Charts ==
Chart (1995–1996)	Peak position
Austrian Top 40	11
Swiss Albums Chart	3
Dutch Album Top 100	10
Belgian (Flanders) Ultratop 50	1
Belgian (Wallonia) Ultratop 50	2
Hungarian Albums Chart	31
Swedish Sverigetopplistan	16
Norwegian VG-lista	5
Finland Albums Chart	32

== Certifications ==
Region	Certification	Certified units/sales
Belgium (BRMA)	Platinum	50,000^{*}
Netherlands (NVPI)	Gold	50,000^{^}
Norway (IFPI Norway)	Gold	25,000^{*}
Switzerland (IFPI Switzerland)	Gold	25,000^{^}
^{*} Sales figures based on certification alone.^{^} Shipments figures based on certification alone.
