= X-Pulsion =

Punk rock band from Belgium formed in 1977 and split in 1978

- Origin: Brussels, Belgium
- Genres: Punk rock
- Years active: October 1977–May 1978
- Labels: Romantik Records
- Past members: Jerry Wanker; Peter Schlager; Klaus Klang; Kurt Klang; Francis Lozet; Jean-Pol Tinant; Bob Seytor

X-Pulsion is a punk rock band from Brussels, Belgium, that formed in October 1977 and split in May 1978. Peter Schlager formed a new band of the same name but with a new line-up that played between fall 1978 and summer 1979.

== Personnel ==
=== Original line-up ===
- Jean-Pierre Poirier alias Jerry Wanker alias Jerry WX: guitar
- Pedro Ramis alias Peter Schlager: lead vocals
- Klaus Klang: drums
- Kurt Klang: bass

=== Second line-up ===
- Pedro Ramis alias Peter Schlager: lead vocals
- Francis Lozet : guitar
- Jean-Pol Tinant : bass
- Bob Seytor : drums

== Concerts ==
- October 14, 1977, Brussels - first concert in private house
- December 31, 1977, New Year's Eve at the Brussels Martini Center
- (date unknown) at the Grimmerin in Grimbergen

== Single ==
- Heaven only knows/Schmucks/Castration (1978) - Romantik Records - mixed by Frédéric Jannin

== See also ==
- Punk rock in Belgium
