= Nah Neh Nah =

Song by Vaya Con Dios

Single by Vaya Con Dios

from the album Night Owls
- B-side: "Pack Your Memories"; "With You"
- Released: July 1990
- Genre: Gypsy jazz; blues; folk; folk blues
- Length: 2:52
- Label: BMG Ariola
- Songwriters: Dirk Schoufs, Dani Klein, Una Balfe
- Producers: Dani Klein, Dirk Schoufs

Vaya Con Dios singles chronology
"Puerto Rico" (1987)	"Nah Neh Nah" (1990)	"What's a Woman?" (1990)

Music video
- "Nah Neh Nah" on YouTube

"Nah Neh Nah" is a song by Belgian band Vaya Con Dios. It was released in 1990 as the first single from the band's second studio album, Night Owls. The music video consists of one single take.

The song was covered by German Band Keimzeit in 1996, by Italian DJ Rico Bernasconi in 2010, and by German house duo Milk & Sugar in 2011, as well as by German Band Rebel Tell on their album Schlager ist nicht kriminell in 2022.

== Track listings ==
- 7" single
1. "Nah Neh Nah" – 2:52
2. "Pack Your Memories" – 3:04
- 12" single
1. "Nah Neh Nah" – 2:52
2. "Pack Your Memories" – 3:04
3. "With You" – 4:02
- CD single
1. "Nah Neh Nah" – 2:52
2. "Pack Your Memories" – 3:04
3. "With You" – 4:02

== Charts ==
=== Weekly charts ===
Chart (1990)	Peak position
Austria (Ö3 Austria Top 40)	25
Belgium (Ultratop 50 Flanders)	7
Europe (Eurochart Hot 100)	53
West Germany (GfK)	16
Netherlands (Dutch Top 40)	3
Netherlands (Single Top 100)	4
Switzerland (Schweizer Hitparade)	21

Chart (2013)	Peak position
Slovenia (SloTop50)	42

Chart (2020)	Peak position
Poland Airplay (ZPAV)	64

Chart (2022)	Peak position
Hungary (Single Top 40)	38

=== Year-end charts ===
Chart (1990)	Position
Belgium (Ultratop Flanders)	40
Netherlands (Dutch Top 40)	24
Netherlands (Single Top 100)	38

Chart (1991)	Position
Germany (Official German Charts)	51

== Milk & Sugar vs. Vaya Con Dios version ==
"Hey (Nah Neh Nah)"

Single by Milk & Sugar vs. Vaya Con Dios
- Released: 20 December 2010
- Genre: House, trance
- Length: 3:17
- Label: 541/N.E.W.S.
- Songwriters: Dirk Schoufs, Dani Klein, Una Balfe
- Producers: Mike Milk; Steven Sugar

Milk & Sugar vs. Vaya Con Dios singles chronology
"Let the Sun Shine" (2010)	"Hey (Nah Neh Nah)" (2010)	"Hi-A Ma (Pata Pata)" (2011)

In late 2010, German house duo Milk & Sugar released a remix version of the song. It became a top 10 hit in Austria, Belgium, Czech Republic, Germany, Netherlands, Slovakia, and Switzerland.

=== Track listings ===
- Belgian CD single
1. "Hey (Nah Neh Nah)" – 3:17
2. "Hey (Nah Neh Nah)" (Extended Mix) – 5:13
3. "Hey (Nah Neh Nah)" (Club Mix) – 5:53
4. "Hey (Nah Neh Nah)" (Dub Mix) – 5:23
- German CD single
1. "Hey (Nah Neh Nah)" (Milk & Sugar Radio Version) – 3:17
2. "Hey (Nah Neh Nah)" (Milk & Sugar Club Mix) – 5:53

=== Charts and certifications ===
==== Weekly charts ====
Chart (2011)	Peak position
Austria (Ö3 Austria Top 40)	6
Belgium (Ultratop 50 Flanders)	10
Belgium (Ultratop 50 Wallonia)	46
Czech Republic Airplay (ČNS IFPI)	1
Germany (GfK)	7
Israel International Airplay (Media Forest)	1
Netherlands (Dutch Top 40)	4
Netherlands (Single Top 100)	5
Russia Airplay (TopHit); Milk & Sugar Radio Version	32
Slovakia Airplay (ČNS IFPI)	7
Spain (Promusicae)	48
Switzerland (Schweizer Hitparade)	4
UK Dance (Official Charts)	13
UK Singles (The Official Charts Company)	94
Ukraine Airplay (TopHit); Milk & Sugar Radio Version	53

==== Year-end charts ====
Chart (2011)	Position
Russia Airplay (TopHit)	123
Ukraine Airplay (TopHit)	126

==== Certifications ====
Region	Certification
Austria (IFPI Austria)	Gold
Germany (BVMI)	Gold

== See also ==
- Nyah nyah nyah nyah nyah nyah, a children's taunt.
