= Red Zebra =

Red Zebra may refer to:

- Red Zebra (mbuna), tropical fish from Lake Malawi
- Red Zebra (band), Belgian new wave band
- Red Zebra Broadcasting, American media corporation and radio station operator
- The nickname of Taiwan Railways EMU1200 series train
