= Vaya Con Dios (album) =

Studio album by Vaya Con Dios
- Released: 1988
- Studio: BSB Studios in Brussels
- Genre: Soft rock Smooth jazz
- Length: 42:38
- Label: Ariola Records
- Producer: Dani Klein; Dirk Schoufs

Vaya Con Dios chronology
Vaya Con Dios (1988)	Night Owls (1990)

Vaya Con Dios is the first studio album by Vaya Con Dios. It was released in 1988.

== Track listing ==
Side A
No.	Title	Length
1.	"Don't Cry For Louie"	2:57
2.	"The Moonshiner"	2:43
3.	"Lord Help Me Please"	3:17
4.	"Lay Your Hands"	3:40
5.	"Lulu's Song"	4:46
6.	"Just A Friend Of Mine"	3:18

Side B
No.	Title	Length
1.	"I Sold My Soul"	4:56
2.	"One Silver Dollar" (originally performed by Marilyn Monroe)	3:11
3.	"Philadelphia"	3:29
4.	"Remember"	2:45
5.	"Puerto Rico"	4:16
6.	"Johnny" (composed in 1937 by Richard Stein under the title "Sanie cu zurgălăi", and performed by Edith Piaf as "Johnny, tu n'es pas un ange")	2:15

== Personnel ==
- Acoustic guitar — Jean-Michel Gielen, Bert Decorte, Nono Garcia
- Backing vocals — Dani Klein, Dirk Schoufs, Julia Loko, Verona Davis, Wild One Dee
- Bugle, trumpet — Patrick Mortier
- Double bass — Dirk Schoufs
- Drums — Marcel De Cauwer
- Harmonica — Big Brad
- Horns — Pat More Section
- Percussion — Kays Rostom
- Piano, Hammond organ — Frank Wuyts
- Saxophone — Frank Vaganée
- Trombone — Joost Derijckere

== Charts ==
Chart performance for Vaya Con Dios
Chart (1988–90)	Peak position
Austrian Albums (Ö3 Austria)	10
Dutch Albums (Album Top 100)	75
Finnish Albums (Suomen virallinen lista)	1
German Albums (Offizielle Top 100)	49
Swedish Albums (Sverigetopplistan)	9
Swiss Albums (Schweizer Hitparade)	23

== Certifications and sales ==
Region	Certification	Certified units/sales
Belgium (BRMA)	Gold	25,000^{*}
Finland (Musiikkituottajat)	Platinum	65,287
France	—	70,000
Portugal (AFP)	Silver	10,000^{^}
Switzerland (IFPI Switzerland)	Platinum	50,000^{^}
Summaries
Worldwide	—	2,000,000
^{*} Sales figures based on certification alone.^{^} Shipments figures based on certification alone.
