= Sanie cu zurgălăi =

1936 song by Richard Stein

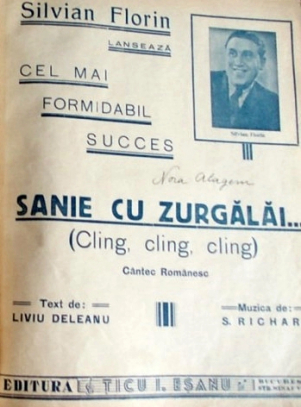
Original Sheet music of "Sanie cu zurgălăi" (1937). Note that Stein is credited as "S. Richard".

"Sanie cu zurgălăi" (Romanian for "Sleigh with bells") is a Romanian language song composed in 1936 by Jewish-Romanian composer Richard Stein. Romanian language lyrics were written by Liviu Deleanu. The song was recorded in 1937 by Silvian Florin and by Petre Alexandru. The song was later covered and re-arranged by numerous musicians in different languages. Most notable covers are by Les Paul, under the title "Johnny Is the Boy for Me" (1952) in English, by Edith Piaf (1953) and Vaya con Dios (1988) as "Johnny, tu n'es pas un ange" in French, and by Zvonko Bogdan as "Svaku ženu volim ja" (1988) in Serbo-Croatian.

The song was the cause of a long-lasting court battle between Stein and Paul over plagiarism charges. Stein eventually won the case.

== Original Romanian version ==
"Sanie cu zurgălăi" was composed in 1936 by Richard Stein (1909-1992) especially for Maria Tănase, who refused to sing it considering the song of low quality. The lyrics were written by Liviu Deleanu, a Jewish-Romanian poet and playwright.

Subsequently, the song was recorded by Silvian Florin for His Master's Voice (cat. no. JB 163) and Radio Romania archives. It was also recorded the same year by Ionel Pascu, for the less known label Pan (formerly Lifa, cat. No. P 9). On the cover of the original music sheet, which appeared in late 1937, the song was subtitled "Cling, cling, cling".

The modern version of the song, the best known today, was recorded in 1949 by folk singer Maria Lătărețu for Columbia Records (cat. no. DR435). The chorus was added and some lyrics changed.

== Cover versions ==
In 1953, American jazz, country and blues guitarist Les Paul covered the Mary Lătăreţu version of the song under the title "Johnny Is the Boy for Me". English language lyrics, not connected to the Romanian original, were written by English lyricist and singer Paddy Roberts and Belgian producer and songwriter Marcel Stellman. Vocals were provided by Mary Ford, Paul's wife. Paul's version was recorded in 1953 for Capitol Records (cat. No. 2486).

Few months later, "Johnny" was heard by Édith Piaf, who recorded her cover of Paul's version in December 1953 for Columbia Records (cat. No. BF 596) with French lyrics under the title "Johnny, tu n'es pas un ange". French lyrics were written by Francis Lemarque (1917-2002). On Piaf's record, the music was credited to Paul.

Stein subsequently became a lawyer and sued Paul for plagiarism in the 1950s. It was one of the first lawsuits for plagiarism in music. Some Romanian sources indicate that Stein won the case, but the ASCAP/BMI publishing database to this day still credits "Johnny Is The Boy For Me" entirely and solely to Les Paul, Paddy Roberts and Marcel Stellman.

In 1968 the israeli duet Esther and Abi Ofarim recorded a fast version in romanian on their Up To Date album (Philips 838808JY, Phonodor 12196). Strangely, none of the authors are credited, only the music producers A.Dayam and A.White.

In 1988, Belgian band Vaya Con Dios recorded a cover of Piaf's "Johnny, tu n'es pas un ange" in French on their debut album Vaya Con Dios. On the record, the song was attributed to Édith Piaf, Les Paul and Francis Lemarque. In July 2001, nine years after Stein's death, UCMR-ADA (Romanian Musical Performing and Mechanical Rights Society) sued Vaya Con Dios for plagiarism because the band paid royalties to Les Paul instead of Stein.

In 2009, the song was featured in the Ubisoft game Rabbids Go Home, performed by the Moldovan gypsy brass band Fanfare Vagabontu.

In 2010, the Israeli artist Yoni Eilat recorded a Yiddish cover of the song, "Vint un fayer" (Yiddish: וינט און פייער), for his album "Tzigayner Neshume".
