= Night Owls (album) =

Studio album by Vaya Con Dios
- Released: 25 April 1990
- Recorded: Winter 1989–1990
- Studio: BSB Studios in Brussels
- Genre: Jazz; blues; soul; Latin pop; gypsy; soft rock
- Length: 40:37
- Label: Ariola Records
- Producer: Dani Klein; Dirk Schoufs

Vaya Con Dios chronology
Vaya Con Dios (1988)	Night Owls (1990)	Time Flies (1992)

Night Owls is the second studio album by Vaya Con Dios. It was released in 1990.

== Track listing ==
Side A
No.	Title	Length
1.	"Nah Neh Nah"	2:52
2.	"Far Gone Now"	3:08
3.	"Sunny Days"	3:29
4.	"Sally"	3:28
5.	"Something’s Got A Hold On Me"	2:36
6.	"I Don’t Want To Know"	3:35

Side B
No.	Title	Length
1.	"What's a Woman?"	3:56
2.	"Night Owls"	3:56
3.	"Pack Your Memories"	3:04
4.	"With You"	4:02
5.	"Travelling Light"	3:32
6.	"Quand elle rit aux éclats"	3:46

== Personnel ==
- André Brasseur – Hammond organ
- Bruno Castellucci – drums
- Steve Clisby – background vocals
- Verona Davis – background vocals
- Jason Johnson – background vocals
- Dani Klein – vocals
- Eric Melaerts – acoustic guitar
- Patrick Mortier – trumpet, flugelhorn
- Dirk Schoufs – bass guitar, arranger, producer
- Frank Wuyts – piano
- Marc François – mixing engineer

== Charts ==
=== Weekly charts ===
Chart (1990–1993)	Peak position
Austrian Albums (Ö3 Austria)	4
Dutch Albums (Album Top 100)	5
German Albums (Offizielle Top 100)	6
Hungarian Albums (MAHASZ)	32
Swedish Albums (Sverigetopplistan)	8
Swiss Albums (Schweizer Hitparade)	1

=== Year-end charts ===
Chart (1990)	Position
Austrian Albums (Ö3 Austria)	9
Dutch Albums (Album Top 100)	14
German Albums (Offizielle Top 100)	33
Swiss Albums (Schweizer Hitparade)	2

Chart (1991)	Position
Dutch Albums (Album Top 100)	94
German Albums (Offizielle Top 100)	20
Swiss Albums (Schweizer Hitparade)	12

== Certifications and sales ==
Region	Certification	Certified units/sales
Austria (IFPI Austria)	Platinum	50,000^{*}
Belgium (BRMA)	Platinum	30,000^{*}
Denmark	—	27,000
Finland (Musiikkituottajat)	Gold	29,481
France (SNEP)	Gold	140,000
Germany (BVMI)	Platinum	500,000^{^}
Netherlands (NVPI)	Platinum	100,000^{^}
Norway	—	10,000
Sweden (GLF)	Gold	56,000
Switzerland (IFPI Switzerland)	3× Platinum	150,000^{^}
Summaries
Worldwide	—	2,000,000
^{*} Sales figures based on certification alone.^{^} Shipments figures based on certification alone.
