= Time Flies (Vaya Con Dios album) =

Studio album by Vaya Con Dios
- Released: September 1992
- Recorded: Jet Studios (Brussels)
- Genres: Soft rock, jazz-rock, blues
- Length: 42:50
- Label: Ariola Records
- Producer: Dani Klein

Vaya Con Dios chronology
Night Owls (1990)	Time Flies (1992)	Roots and Wings (1995)

Professional ratings
Review scores
Source	Rating
AllMusic	4/5 stars
Select	2/5 medals

Time Flies is the third studio album by Vaya Con Dios, who were at this point mostly a one-woman band. Even more than the previous albums, this is a melancholic album and is more blues and soul oriented. The reason for the theme is because Vaya Con Dios was mainly the partnership of Dani Klein and Dirk Schoufs and in 1991 the pair fell out badly. On 24 May 1991 Schoufs, who was only 29, died of a cocktail of medication, drugs and alcohol.

The album did very well in Europe, reaching number one in Switzerland and getting platinum certification in four countries, eventually proving to be the most successful Vaya Con Dios album.

Time Flies was the first album by Vaya Con Dios which did not end with a song in French.

== Track listing ==
No.	Title	Length
1.	"Time Flies"	3:39
2.	"Forever Blue"	3:58
3.	"Farewell Song"	3:09
4.	"So Long Ago"	2:55
5.	"Still a Man"	3:36
6.	"Heading for a Fall"	3:42
7.	"Mothers and Daughters"	2:31
8.	"Listen"	3:19
9.	"Bold and Untrue"	3:08
10.	"Muddy Waters"	3:17
11.	"For You"	3:10
12.	"Brave Jane"	3:16
13.	"At the Parallel"	2:57

== Charts ==
=== Weekly charts ===
Chart (1992–1993)	Peak position
Austrian Albums (Ö3 Austria)	4
Dutch Albums (Album Top 100)	1
German Albums (Offizielle Top 100)	9
Hungarian Albums (MAHASZ)	12
Norwegian Albums (VG-lista)	11
Swedish Albums (Sverigetopplistan)	13
Swiss Albums (Schweizer Hitparade)	1

=== Year-end charts ===
Chart (1992)	Position
Dutch Albums (Album Top 100)	24
German Albums (Offizielle Top 100)	93
Swiss Albums (Schweizer Hitparade)	34

Chart (1993)	Position
Dutch Albums (Album Top 100)	22
German Albums (Offizielle Top 100)	47
Swiss Albums (Schweizer Hitparade)	12

== Certifications and sales ==
Region	Certification	Certified units/sales
Austria (IFPI Austria)	Gold	25,000^{*}
France	—	50,000
Germany (BVMI)	Platinum	500,000^{^}
Netherlands (NVPI)	Platinum	100,000^{^}
Norway (IFPI Norway)	Platinum	50,000^{*}
Sweden (GLF)	Gold	50,000^{^}
Switzerland (IFPI Switzerland)	3× Platinum	150,000^{^}
Summaries
Europe	—	1,000,000
^{*} Sales figures based on certification alone.^{^} Shipments figures based on certification alone.
