= Just a Friend of Mine =

Single by Vaya Con Dios

from the album Vaya Con Dios
- B-side: "You Let Me Down"
- Released: 1987
- Genre: Smooth jazz, pop rock
- Length: 3:20
- Label: Ariola
- Producer(s): Phil Gosez

Vaya Con Dios singles chronology
"Just a Friend of Mine" (1987)	"Puerto Rico" (1987)

"Just a Friend of Mine" is the debut single by the Belgian band Vaya Con Dios. It was released in 1987 by Ariola Records and later included in the band's debut album Vaya Con Dios.

== Track listings ==
7" single
A. "Just a Friend of Mine" (3:20)
B. "You Let Me Down" (2:34)

Written by Al Dubin and Warren Harry

12" single
A. "Just a Friend of Mine" (Long Version) (6:01)
B1. "Just a Friend of Mine" (3:20)
B2. "You Let Me Down" (2:34)

Written by Al Dubin and Warren Harry

== Credits ==
- Written by Dani Shoovaerts, Dirk Shoufs, Willy Lambregt
- Produced by Phil Gosez

== Charts ==
Chart (1990)	Peak position
Belgium (Ultratop 50 Flanders)	17
France (SNEP)	7

In France, the single has sold over 300,000 copies.
