= Machiavel (band) =

Belgian rock band

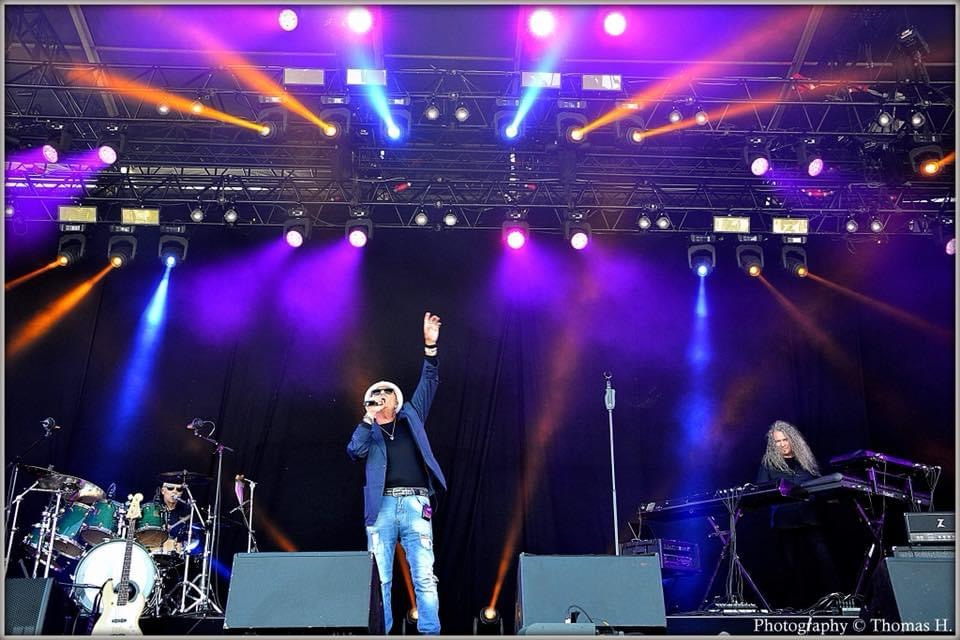
- Machiavel in live in the Nostalgie Beach Festival, (2016).

Background information
- Origin: Brussels, Belgium
- Genres: Progressive rock; new wave; art rock; symphonic rock; pop rock; hard rock
- Years active: 1974–present
- Labels: Harvest, EMI, Warner, Accord, Tempel, Moonzoo, CNR, Indisc, Musea
- Members: Marc Ysaye; Roland Degreef; Hervé Borbe; Christophe Pons
- Past members: Albert Letecheur; Jack Roskam; Jean-Paul Devaux; Mario Guccio; Thierry Plas; Paolo Ragatzu
- Website: machiavel.be

Machiavel is a Belgian rock group formed in 1974. The band's first few albums were progressive rock, while their later albums shifted towards new wave. By mid 1970s, Machiavel had established themselves as one of the most popular Belgian groups.

== History ==
=== Early years (1974–1987) ===
Machiavel were founded in 1974 by Roland De Greef (bass) and Marc Ysaÿe (drums and vocals), named after Niccolò Machiavelli. At the time, they were playing in a group called Moby Dick with Jack Roskam (guitar) and Albert Letecheur (keyboard). They released their first eponymous album in 1976.

Jack Roskam was soon replaced by Jean-Paul Devaux. Mario Guccio joined the group as lead vocalist due to his move out to Yugoslavia. The new formation released Jester in 1977. The next year saw the release of the album, Mechanical Moonbeams.

Urban Games was the band's most successful album to date. It attempted to move away from the Eurock style and proposed songs leaning on disco ("Dancing Heroes"), hard rock ("The Dictators"), reggae ("Over the Hill"), and Eurock still ("City Flowers"). Albert Letecheur and Jean-Paul Devaux left the group in 1979.

New Lines was released in 1980, with Thierry Plas on lead guitar. The single "Fly" was an immediate success, but the group's next attempt with the album Break Out produced by Derek Laurence in 1981 did not meet success, and after The Cry of Pleasure in 1987, the group went inactive for a number of years.

=== End of hiatus (1999–present) ===
The band resumed activity in 1999 with Virtual Sun, followed by Welcome to Paradise in 2003 and 2005 in 2005. In 2010, Thierry Plas left the band because of musical differences and went in search of other projects. A new album Eleven was released featuring new guitarist Christophe Pons.

Members are active in radio and promoting and supporting new acts in Belgium.

Mario Guccio died at the age of 64 on 21 January 2018.

== Band members ==
1976	Marc Ysaÿe – lead vocals, drums; Jack Roskam – guitar; Albert Letecheur – keyboards; Roland De Greef – bass
1977–1979	Marc Ysaÿe – lead vocals, drums; Jean-Paul Devaux – guitar; Albert Letecheur – keyboards; Roland De Greef – bass; Mario Guccio – lead vocal
1979–1983	Marc Ysaÿe – lead vocals, drums; Thierry Plas – guitar; Roland De Greef – bass; Mario Guccio – lead vocal
1987	Marc Ysaÿe – lead vocals, drums; Thierry Plas – guitar; Paolo Regatzu – keyboards; Roland De Greef – bass; Mario Guccio – lead vocal
1997–2010	Marc Ysaÿe – lead vocals, drums; Thierry Plas – guitar; Roland De Greef – bass; Mario Guccio – lead vocal; Hervé Borbé – keyboards
2010-today	Marc Ysaÿe – lead vocals, drums; Christophe Pons – guitar; Roland De Greef – bass; Mario Guccio – lead vocal; Hervé Borbé – keyboards

== Discography ==
=== Studio albums ===
- Machiavel (EMI, 1976, LP Vinyl)
- Jester (EMI, 1977, LP Vinyl)
- Mechanical Moonbeams (EMI, 1978, LP Vinyl)
- Urban Games (EMI, 1979, LP Vinyl)
- New Lines (EMI, 1980, LP Vinyl)
- Break Out (EMI, 1981, LP Vinyl)
- Valentine's Day (EMI, 1982, LP Vinyl)
- The Cry Of Pleasure (INDISC, 1987, LP Vinyl)
- 40th Anniversary (2015, Vinyl, Limited Edition, Special Edition)

=== Compilation albums ===
- The Best of Machiavel (EMI, 1991, CD)

=== Reissues ===
- Machiavel (EMI, 1993, CD)
- Jester (EMI, 1993, CD)
- Mechanical Moonbeams (EMI, 1993, CD)
- Urban Games (EMI, 1993, CD)
- New Lines (EMI, 1993, CD)
- 20th Anniversary Machiavel – The Very Best Of (EMI, 1996, CD)
- Virtual Sun (CNR Arcade, 1999, CD)
- Machiavel Live (EMI, 1999, CD)
- Break Out (Hans Kuster Music, 2000, CD)
- Original Hits (EMI, 2000, CD)
- Anthology (EMI, 2001, CD)
- Welcome to Paradise (CNR Arcade, 2003, CD)
- The Essential of Machiavel (2003, EMI, CD)
- Mechanical Moonbeams (2005, EMI, CD)
- 2005 (2005, Bang, CD)
- Best of Machiavel (2006, More Than Télémoustique, CD)
- Acoustic (2009, Moonzoo Music, CD)
- Eleven (2011, Moonzoo Music, CD)
- Colours (2013, Moonzoo Music, CD)

== See also ==
- Belgian rock
