= Poésie Noire =

Belgian band

- Origin: Belgium
- Genres: New beat, new wave, EBM, dark wave, synth-pop, electropop, gothic rock
- Years active: 1984–1992
- Labels: ARS Records; Antler-Subway; EMI Belgium; Stiletto; Boy Records (Spain)
- Members: Johan Casters; Marianne Valvekens; Herman Gillis; Evanna; Ludo Camberlin aka Carl S. Johansen (the TBX project.)

Poésie Noire are a Belgian band that rose to prominence in the mid-1980s. Their Belgian origins and tendency to develop a goth-oriented, synthetic, gloomy universe with low-pitched voices – Poésie Noire could translate by "Black/Dark Poetry" – had them categorized as EBM, along with other Belgian members of the 1980s electronic music scene like À;GRUMH... or A Split-Second. However, much in the manner of various renowned Belgian EBM bands like The Neon Judgement and, to some extent, Front 242, they declared, through their music, a will to step away from the usual industrial aggressiveness that characterized Electronic body music and developed a more mainstream accessible dark pop sound that helped them to be regarded as plain new wave or dark wave.

== History ==
=== Band members ===
Initially based on seven members, Poésie Noire rapidly boiled down to just three hardcore members so as to be finally incarnated by Johan Casters aka "La Bête Noire" – "The Black/Dark Beast" – (writer, composer and main male singer of the band), Marianne Valvekens (co-writer, female vocalist up to the 1991 Marianne album – and then back on Sense of Purpose – and keyboard player) and Herman Gillis (co-writer and mainly the band's guitar player.) As Poésie Noire's fanbase grew along the years, Casters and Valvekens were soon to be given 'status nicknames' (probably in tradition of some typically "Goth-spirited" symbolical hierarchy.) Consequently, it did not take long for Casters to be considered the band's "Master" to the fans whereas Valvekens became their "Goddess".

In 1991, Irish vocalist Evanna joined the band for the Marianne album because producer Ludo Camberlin did not feel that Valverken's voice was right for the album and Evanna's had more warmth and soul to it.

=== Career summary ===
Little is known about how the band actually started their career in music. They are known to have won the 1985 Breekend Rock Festival (a long-lasting, reputed festival set in Bree, Belgium, that hosted large amounts of well-known bands such as The Smiths in 1984 or even Slade in 2009). The following year, Poésie Noire started supporting Dead Can Dance and The Sisters of Mercy on tour, along with their own personal gigs. Along their years as Poésie Noire, the band demonstrated qualities as an act with releases : in just seven years, Casters, Valvekens and Gillis recorded nine albums and mini-albums, two official best of compilation, one remix compilation and 15 singles, which allowed them to appear on various EBM or new wave compilations and become genuine figures of the kind throughout their sphere of influence.

=== TBX ===
By 1992, it seems the relations between Poésie Noire and their label, Antler-Subway, were not as sound as they used to. Indeed, the record label promised the band they would release yet another album of the band's composition entitled Delirious, but this never happened and Antler-Subway finally released Casters, Gillis and newcomer Evanna from their recording contract instead.

With the help of Ludo Camberlin aka Carl S. Johansen, who had been their producer since the 1989 album Love is Colder than Death, Poésie Noire changed their name to TBX ("To Be eXcited") and signed to larger label EMI Belgium that enabled them to release this Delirious album which had been the source of so many issues and changes. But unfortunately for the band, this new beginning rapidly ended up unsuccessful – because the band's "music [was not] meant for [the] mass consumption [that EMI was used to aiming at]", their official site explains – and led EMI Belgium to delete TBX from their catalog promptly afterwards. Consequently, for Poésie Noire/TBX', the bell tolled although they finally returned in 2010 with a new album, Sense of Purpose.

=== Sense of Purpose ===
More than a decade after the band split, they formed again and started working on a new album, Sense of Purpose, finally released in October 2010 under the name that made them famous, Poésie Noire.

The release of this new opus went along with Poésie Noire taking part in the Sinner's Day festival, on 31 October 2010, together with such prestigious artists as Heaven 17, Nina Hagen, Marc Almond, The Psychedelic Furs, Echo & the Bunnymen, Peter Murphy, The Selecter, Department S, Marky Ramone, Jah Wobble or Young Gods.

== Side-projects and aftermath ==
After Poésie Noire disbanded, their members carried on musical projects they had been involved in while the band was active, developed new ones or radically turned over a new leaf.

=== Johan Casters ===
Using different aliases (Morton, Joey Morton, Pateke Morton, Ilya Dimitrijevic, Jill (or Jille) Johnson or Alessandro Di Ravo), Johan Casters has extensively served as a writer, producer and even remixer or editor for various acts and artists. He has developed personal projects from the late 1980s onwards, either alone or with Herman Gillis.

As a producer or executive producer, Jo has been involved in several obscure projects such as The Passion of a Primitif, Company of State, Men 2nd, In Sotto Voce, Attrition, Ei Mori, Bulgarka, Danse Macabre, Pussy Jew, Dee Bass, Translator, Minimalistix, Orion Too feat. Caitlin, Roxane and Biba Binoche.

Joe has engaged and collaborated with several artists including The Neon Judgement, Jean-Paul Gaultier, The Weathermen, Jean-Jacques Smoothie, and Sinéad O'Connor.

Though Jo and Marianne seem to go on making music together, Jo was known, in the late 1990s, to be working in the field of important musical events coordination and then as A&R for the Roadrunner turned Mostiko division of Arcade/CNR.

=== Johan Casters and Herman Gillis (and sometimes, Marianne) ===
While Poésie Noire was still active, Jo and Herman have been involved as writers and composers in the full or partial development of original or pre-existing projects (with the occasional help of Marianne). The two of them usually worked together though, every once in a while, only one of them would be involved. The massive list of projects the two happen to be behind includes In Sotto Voce, Brothers on Acid, Ei Mori, Bulgarka, Trio Balkana, Fruit of Life, Erotic Dissidents, Mission Impossible, The Brothers, Morton, Sherman and Bellucci, Danse Macabre, Opium Monks, Berliner Meisterschaft, The Secrets of China, Kings of Agreppo, Explorers of the Nile, Taste of Sugar feat. K. Finley, TNT Clan, The New Beat Sensation, Msb Sound System, Beat Professor, The Freak Brothers, Student Fashion, Mr. Horse, Subway's new Acid House Techno Beat, Balearic Beach, M.S.B., Supernova, Brotherhood of Sleep, The Moneymakers, The Airplane Crashers, Voor Den Broode, German Beat Syndrome, Neue Beat Collectione, Matt's Phantasy Club, Serious ft.JJ Maurie, Boris Mikulic, J.E.T., Strictly Nervous.

=== Herman Gillis ===
Similarly to Casters, while he was already busy co-writing Poésie Noire tracks and playing the guitar on them, Herman made sure to develop parallel activities as a producer, writer, composer, programmer and musician using, like his fellow singer, multiple nicknames : Sherman, Herman Sherman, Boris Mikulic and Tessa Rossa. Those activities can be traced back to 1987 until 1994.

Among the projects he worked for as a writer or co-writer, he regularly assumed the position of a musician in some of them and took care of programming, keyboards and guitar-playing. Included in this category are The Passion of a Primitif (1987), Company of State (1987; 1988), In Sotto Voce – actually, a genuine Poésie Noire side-project posing as a Yugoslavian act. It was incarnated by Jo and Herman, respectively pretending to be Ilya Dimitrijevic and Boris Mikulic. The point of creating those bogus identities and launching this project was to give a "response to a belgian journalist who found Poésie Noire too "poppy" " (the official site claims) – (1987; 1988; 1989), Boris Mikulic (1990), Volt (formerly known as Running Cow) (1993)...

Gillis, much like Casters, also remixed or edited recordings by various artists either with or without Jo : Jean-Paul Gaultier (1989), Take 6 and Take 7 (19??), DWF (1990), and Wire.

Producing records soon got Gillis interested and he quickly had his own production company set up : Sherman Productions. Among the acts produced by him – either with or without Jo, once again – one can point out : Ei Mori (1988), Bulgarka (1988), Danse Macabre (1988), Boris Mikulic (1990), Spectralyzer (1991), Trance Too (1991), Volt (1993–1994) or Hypnotyz (199?).

Gillis is also reputed for working on a first hand-made filter known as the Sherman Filterbank used by many renowned artists such as Air, The Chemical Brothers, Madonna or the Rolling Stones. After the band Volt he was involved in split up, Gillis decided he would resign from the music scene and dedicate his energy to the conception of electronic filters and effect boxes of the same kind.

=== Marianne Valvekens ===
Contrarily to Jo and Hermann, it seems that record production was never an ambition to Marianne which did not stop her from lending her voice to other Poésie Noire-related projects – being sometimes credited as "the Ice Queen" Valvekens – and taking part in the writing and composing of other projects.

As a vocalist, Marianne, along with Jo, took part in the 1986 Mijn-Alarm (Mine-Alarm in Dutch) project which consisted in gathering the singers from 19 Belgian bands such as The Scabs, The Pop Gun or Siglo XX: each of them were to sing a couple lines from the project's song so as to produce a record whose goal was to raise money for the Limburg mineworkers. Later, in 2001, she also gave her voice to M&M Project feat.M's 'Wide anthem (Sometimes It Hurt) – the final '"M"' stood for Marianne – one of the many Casters-related projects she contributed to also as a writer-composer.

When she assumed those positions, Marianne used two pseudonyms – Laura Furia and Mateke Porton – which she signed several contributions to various projects with : Strictly Nervous, A Collection of Acid Jazz – Jazzy House – Jazz Dance (1993), M&M Project feat.M's 'Wide Anthem (Sometimes It Hurt) (2001), Orion Too feat.Caitlin's Hope and Wait (2002), So Shy (2002), Travelling (2003) and Making Love for the First Time (2003), Biba Binoche's Je Chante pour toi (2004) and X3 vs Francis Goya's Rain, the guitar song (2003).

Around 2003, she was also said to be writing a book but no further piece of news has ever surfaced about it since then.

However, it seems that from the late 1990s onwards, Valvekens's main occupation has been as a worker in some kind of employment agency.

=== Evanna ===
After her Poésie Noire/TBX years, it seems Evanna has not been heard of again in the music-making business

=== Ludo Camberlin/Carl S. Johansen ===
While living the Poésie Noire/TBX episode, Ludo Camberlin also worked as a producer on projects affiliated with Jo (Attrition) and has kept producing other influential members of the Belgian music scene such as The Lords of Acid ever since. He apparently now focusses on writing and producing house and techno records.

== Discography ==
=== Albums and mini-albums ===
- The Gioconda Smile (1985, ARS Records, LP)
- Hum and Haw (1986, Antler-Subway, LP)
- Tales of Doom (1987, Antler-Subway, LP/CD)
- Tetra (1988, Antler-Subway, LP/CD)
- Existential Despair Methaphysical Distress Ontological Ungludation and Cosmic Meltdown (1988, Antler-Subway, CD)
- En Grande Colère (Seven Tales of Schizophrenia) (1988, Antler-Subway, LP)
- (Untitled) (1988, Antler-Subway, Cassette)
- Pity for the Self or We'll Teach You to Dance (1989, Antler-Subway, LP)
- En Grand Colère & Pity for the Self or We'll Teach You to Dance (1989, Antler-Subway, CD)
- Love Is Colder Than Death (1989, Antler-Subway, LP/CD/Cassette)
- Complicated – Compilated 84-89 (Best of Compilation) (1990, Antler-Subway, LP/CD/Cassette)
  - Stiletto, a Brazilian record label, also released another LP version of this compilation with 5 songs fewer than the Antler-Subway one.
- Marianne (1991, Antler-Subway, LP/CD/Cassette)
- Tabula Rasa (1991, Antler-Subway, CD)
- Delirious (as TBX) (1992, EMI Belgium/Creastars, CD/Cassette)
- The Sense of Purpose (2010)

=== Singles ===
- "The Noble Art" (1985, ARS Records, 12")
- "The Gioconda Smile" (1985, ARS Records, 12")
- "Starvation of a Mind" (1986, Antler-Subway, 7")
- "Radio-Active Flood" (1987, Antler-Subway, 12")
- "Timber" (1987, Antler-Subway, 12")
- "Tragedy" (1988, Antler-Subway, 7")
- "Taste of Candy" (1988, Antler-Subway, 7")
- "Love Is Colder Than Death" (1989, Antler-Subway, 12")
- "Déjà Vu" (1989, Antler-Subway, 7")
- "Oblivion" (1989, Antler-Subway, 12"/CDM)
- "Toulouse" (1990, Antler-Subway, 7"/12"/CDM)
- "I Didn't Ask" (1991, Antler-Subway, 7"/12")
- "I've Lost a Friend" (1991, Antler-Subway, 7"/12")
- "B-Wall" (1991, Antler-Subway, 7")
- "Timber (Remix)" (1991, Boy Records (Spain), 7"/12")
- "Inspire Me" (as TBX) (1992, EMI Belgium/Creastars, 7"/12"/CDS/CDM)
- "Sea of Love" (as TBX) (1992, EMI Belgium/Creastars, 7"/CDS)
- "Mercedes Benz" (as TBX) (1992, EMI Belgium/Creastars, 7"/CDS)

=== Bootleg compilations ===
Due to some apparent popularity in some parts of South America, Brazilian labels NovoDisc Brasil Industria Fonographica Ltda and CD+ Nordeste Digital Line/MPR Records released two 'Best of Poésie Noire' CDs between 2002 and 2005. Those CDs cover most of the band's career (exclusively focussing on the Antler-Subway years, that is) by use of randomly selected tracks made up of both singles and LP titles.

- Best of Vol.1 (2002, NovoDisc Brasil Industria Fonographica Ltda, Brazil, CD)
- Best of Vol.2 (2005, CD+ Nordeste Digital Line/MPR Records, Brazil, CD)
- DJ Chesko – New Wave Mix Vol.8 (?, Not on Label, Belgium, CD) / Track : "Hiroshima Mon Amour"

=== Compilation appearances ===
Due to their domestic popularity, several Belgian new wave or EBM compilations have included songs by Poésie Noire among their selections. Nevertheless, some of the compilations below are also German, Austrian, Swedish, Spanish, Dutch, British or even American ones thus vouching for the band's relative fame outside the Belgian borders.

- Mad in Belgium 2 (1985, Mad Tapes & Records, Belgium, Cassette) / Track : "Mohenjodare"
- The New World Beat (1987, New World Records, Belgium, Double LP) / Track : "Gioconda Smile" (Album version)
- One of a Number, Part of a Whole (1987, Antler, ? / Energy Hot Stuff, Sweden, LP) / Track : "Restraint"
- TotalBeatFactor (1988, Big Nopise in Archgate, UK, EP) / Track : "Radio-Active Flood"
- World of Electronic Body Music (1989, Antler, Austria, LP/CD/MC) / Track : "Adaptation"
- Repérages Couleurs – Vol.3 – 1988 (1992, 150 BPM Record, ?, CD) / Track : "Tragedy"
- Spring 1990 Promo Sampler (1990, Antler-Subway, Belgium, Cassette/Sampler/Promo) / Track : "Taste of Candy"
- Studio Brussel – Update Live (1992, ART, Austria, CD) / Track : "Just To Be Me Again"
- New Wave Club Class-X 3 (1992, Antler-Subway, Belgium, CD/MC) / Track : "Gioconda smile (Original)" (Also part of CD Box Set, 98 New Wave Club Class•X Traxx!!! released in 1996 by PIAS, Belgium)
- Guitars & Machines (1995, Blanco Y Negro, Spain, Double LP/Double CD) / Track : "Pity for the Self"
- New Wave Belgian Class-X (1997, Antler-Subway, Holland, CD) / Track : "Poésie Noire: Gioconda Smile" (Instrumental)
- Sounds of EBM (1997, Never Records/Antler-Subway, USA, CD) / Track : "Adaptation"
- Voll Auf Die Zehn! (1997, Public Propaganda, ?, Double LP) / Track : "Timber"
- EBM Club Classics (1998, Synthtic Symphony/SPV, ?, Double CD) / Track : "Compjutr Syntax Error"
- Club Wave 2 (1999, ARS Production, Belgium, Double CD) / Track "Gioconda Smile"
- Real Electronic Beats Classix (2001, Roadrunner Arcade, Double CD) / Track : "Gioconda Smile"
  - Pity for the Self version of "Gioconda Smile" with the last minute missing
- Date Café (2001, Arcade, ?, Double CD) / Track : "Kju:T: All I Wanna Do"
  - A track previously known as "Kju:T:The Sea" when broadcast on Radio Studio Brussels in 1998 after an interview with Casters
- Spook Factory (2003, Contraseña Records, Spain, Double CD) / Track : "Uncertain Smile"
- Bel80 1985 (2005, Universal Music, Germany, CD) / Track : "Gioconda Smile"
- Bel80 1986 (2005, Universal Music, Germany, CD) / Track : "Starvation of the Mind"
- Bel80 1987 (2005, Universal Music, Germany, CD) / Track : "Timber"
- Bel80 1991 (2006, EMI Music, ?, CD) / Track : "Just to Be Me Again"

== See also ==
- List of new wave artists
