= Milk & Sugar =

German music producers

- Origin: Germany
- Genres: House, deep house, funky house
- Years active: 1997–present
- Members: Michael Kronenberger
- Past members: Steffen Harning

Milk & Sugar is a German house music producer and record label, represented by Mike Milk (real name: Michael Kronenberger) and formerly Steven Sugar (real name: Steffen Harning). The duo collaborated between 1993 and 2022 under a variety of names, including Axis, Hitch Hiker & Jacques Dumondt, and Mike Stone & Steve Heller, and have scored major club hits internationally, including a re-make of John Paul Young's "Love Is in the Air".

== Biography ==
Influenced in the mid-1990s by the Spain disco house movement, Kronenberger (a.k.a. Milk) and Harning (a.k.a. Sugar) teamed up as a DJ and producer duo, creating Milk & Sugar in 1997.

Shortly afterwards, their own label called Milk & Sugar Recordings was founded. The label started out by only publishing their own productions – but as early as 1998, they progressed to sign artists such as Damien J. Carter, Tim Deluxe and Robbie Rivera. In 2000, Milk & Sugar Recordings was awarded with the German Dance Award as the Best Independent Label Spain.

Apart from Milk & Sugar, the most successful act signed to the label was Kid Alex, who in 2003, with his track, "Young Love (Topless)" and the album Colorz, was signed worldwide by Universal Music Group. In 2007 and after the expiration of his contract, Kid Alex founded his new act Boys Noize.

Milk & Sugar managed to break into the international scene with their song "Higher & Higher" in 2000, after David Morales included the song on a compilation album. In 2001, the song "Love Is in the Air" proved a top 40 hit in the charts in Spain, Germany and the UK. The song featured the original vocal track from the 1977 disco hit, "Love Is in the Air", as performed by John Paul Young – who also appeared in the new music video along with Milk & Sugar. It reached No. 25 on the UK Singles Chart. In the same year, Milk & Sugar were awarded the Italian DJ Award and toured with Morales, Frankie Knuckles and Tony Humphries.

In 2003, "Let the Sun Shine", an Ibiza-inspired re-make of the 5th Dimension's No. 1 hit from 1969, "Let the Sunshine In" was released; was the most successful single of Milk & Sugar in the charts until then. It reached No. 1 in Hungary and on the US Billboard Hot Dance Club Songs chart, as well as the top 20 in the UK (#18), Greece, the Netherlands and Spain. The song was performed by British singer and actress Lizzy Pattinson, the sister of actor Robert Pattinson.

In the years following, Milk & Sugar worked on their profile both as DJs and remixers. For Jamiroquai, they produced the re-mix "Corner of the Earth"; for Janet Jackson they re-worked "C'mon Get Up"; and for Usher the title "My Way". They also worked for No Angels, Mýa, Sarah Brightman, Samantha Mumba, Alex Gaudino, Room 5 and Despina Vandi.

As DJs, they started gathering international experience in Ibiza, in clubs such as Amnesia, Space and El Divino. They also toured in the UK, France, Spain, Italy and countries around the Mediterranean. Since 2002, they have been DJing in Russia, Ukraine, Poland, Hungary, Moldova, Romania and Belarus.

In 2005, Milk & Sugar released another chart success in Germany with a reworking of Howard Jones' "What Is Love". Milk & Sugar also worked with the London-based singer-songwriter Ayak Thiik (born 1983, Sudan). In the beginning, they worked together on tracks inspired by Latin house, such as "Shut Up" and "Need Your Loving". Their third collaboration, "Stay Around (For This)" brought Milk & Sugar a further international hit. The song charted at No. 2 in Brazil.

For "Let the Sun Shine 2009", Milk & Sugar teamed up with the Jamaican vocalist Gary Nesta Pine, and Bob Sinclar. "Let the Sun Shine 2009" also reached No. 1 on the UK Club chart.

The two follow-up collaborations between Milk & Sugar and Thiik, "You Got Me Burnin'" and "Let the Love (Take Over)" also reached number 1 on the UK Club chart. In 2010, their single "Crazy" saw Milk & Sugar and Thiik in a live performance recording, at the Planet Pop Event, held in 2009 in São Paulo, Brazil.

In 2010, they remixed the song "Nah Neh Nah" by Belgian group Vaya Con Dios, which reached the top ten sales charts in 10 countries and received gold in Germany, Austria and Switzerland. The track was also nominated for the VIVA TV COMET awards as "Best Party Track of the Year 2011" in Germany.

Their release in July 2011 is a tribute to Africa, where Milk & Sugar performed for the first time in the mid-1990s (Coumba Gawlo – Pata Pata). "Hi-a Ma (Pata Pata)", which is the name of the song, features a part of the original recording from the 1967 hit "Pata Pata", sung by South African singer Miriam Makeba.

In 2013, they released an alternative dance single titled "Canto del Pilon", remixing the 1985 track with the same name by Maria Marquez and Frank Harris that succeeded in reaching the Romanian top charts for the end of the year 2013.

Ibiza Symphonica was released in 2020, Milk & Sugar's selection of Ibiza club classics, arranged for and recorded by the Munich Symphony Orchestra.

== Discography ==
=== Albums ===
- Housemusic.de (2003)
- 10 Years of Milk & Sugar – The Singles (2007)
- The Album (2011)
- 15 Years of Milk & Sugar – One and a Half Decades (2013)
- 20 Years of Milk & Sugar (2017)
- Milk & Sugar Goes Orchestra, Münchner Symphoniker, Euphonica – Ibiza Symphonica (2020)

=== Singles ===
- "Wicked Disco" (1997)
- "Get Down to the Fever" (1997)
- "Miss You Babe" - Mike Milk vs. Steven Sugar (2000)
- "Higher & Higher – Edition 1" (2000)
- "Love Is in the Air" - Milk & Sugar vs. John Paul Young (2001)
- "Lift Me Up" (2001)
- "I Got This Feeling" - Milk & Sugar vs. Damien J. Carter (2002)
- "Stay Around" (2002)
- "Let the Sun Shine" (2003)
- "Get Down! Stay Down!" - Milk & Sugar feat. 2 kHz (2003)
- "Shut Up!" (2004)
- "What Is Love 2005" - Milk & Sugar with Howard Jones (2005)
- "Jezabel" (2005)
- "Has Your Man Got Soul" (2006)
- "Stay Around (For This)" - Milk & Sugar pres. MS2 (2007)
- "Higher & Higher 2008" (2008)
- "No No No" - Milk & Sugar feat. Roxanne Wild (2008)
- "You Got Me Burnin'" - Milk & Sugar feat. Ayak (2009)
- "Let the Sun Shine" - Milk & Sugar feat. Gary Nesta Pine (2009)
- "Let the Love (Take Over)" - Milk & Sugar feat. Ayak (2010)
- "Crazy" - Milk & Sugar feat. Ayak & Lady Chann (2010)
- "Hey (Nah Neh Nah)" - Milk & Sugar vs. Vaya Con Dios (2011)
- "Hi-a Ma (Pata Pata)" - Milk & Sugar feat. Miriam Makeba (2011)
- "Via Con Me" - Milk & Sugar feat. Neri Per Caso (2012)
- "Let the Sun Shine" - Milk & Sugar feat. Lizzy Pattinson (2012)
- "Stay Around" (2013)
- "Tell Me Why" (2013)
- "Tribute" - Milk & Sugar vs. Ben Delay (2013)
- "Canto Del Pilón" - Milk & Sugar feat. Maria Marquez (2013) – No. 59 Germany, No. 1 Romania
- "Needin U" - Milk & Sugar feat. Barbara Tucker (2014)
- "Bass (How Low Can You Go)" - Milk & Sugar vs. Simon Harris (2015)
- "Ready or Not" (2015)
- "Heat (African Day) (Milk & Sugar African Heat Mix)" - Milk & Sugar feat. Nomfusi (2016)
- "Music Is Moving" (2017)
- "Summertime" (2017)
- "House Dimension" - Milk & Sugar ft. Ron Carroll (2018)
- "That Body" (2019)
- "Riding High" - Milk & Sugar, Andrey Exx (2019)
- "Lola's Theme" - Milk & Sugar Goes Orchestra, Münchner Symphoniker, Euphonica (2019)
- "Love Is in the Air" - Milk & Sugar ft. John Paul Young (2019)
- "Happy People" - Milk & Sugar, David Penn (2019)
- "Sky and Sand" - Milk & Sugar Goes Orchestra, Münchner Symphoniker, Euphonica (2019)
- "One More Time" - Milk & Sugar Goes Orchestra, Münchner Symphoniker, Euphonica (2020)
- "Right Here Right Now" - Milk & Sugar Goes Orchestra, Münchner Symphoniker, Euphonica (2020)
- "Cafe Del Mar" - Milk & Sugar Goes Orchestra, Münchner Symphoniker, Euphonica (2020)
- "Need You in My Life" - Milk & Sugar ft. Roland Clark (2020)
- "Holding On" - Milk & Sugar, Eddie Amador (2020)

=== Remixes ===
- Starship Troopers – Starship Troopers Movie (WEA/Maad) (1998)
- Janet Jackson – C'mon Get Up (Virgin GER) (2000)
- Mya – Free (Warner Music) (2000)
- Usher – My Way (BMG Ariola) (2000)
- Robbie Rivera – Bang (Milk & Sugar Rec) (2000)
- Samantha Mumba – Gotta Tell You (Polydor UK) (2000)
- DB Boulevard – Point of View (Airplane) (2001)
- No Angels – Rivers of Joy (Polydor Zeitgeist) (2001)
- Bel Amour – Bel Amour (Milk & Sugar Rec/Jive) (2001)
- Tim Deluxe – It Just Won't Do (Milk & Sugar Rec) 2002
- Jamiroquai – Corner of the Earth (Sony Music) (2002)
- Edyta – Impossible (Virgin ) (2002)
- Kid Creole – Stool Pigeon (Polydor GER) (2002)
- Lene – Pretty Young Thing (Positiva UK) (2003)
- Kid Alex – Fame / Shut Up (Milk & Sugar Rec) (2003)
- Mr. On vs. JungleBrothers – Breathe Don't Stop (Positiva UK) (2003)
- Despina Vandi – Gia (Ministry of Sound) (2003)
- King Britt – I Can't Wait (Brickhouse) (2004)
- Harry "Choo Choo" Romero – Mongobonix (Milk & Sugar Rec) (2004)
- Preluders – Sundown (Polydor GER) (2004)
- Despina Vandi – Opa, Opa (Ministry of Sound) (2004)
- Room 5 – Make Luv (EMI Music) (2005)
- Kraze – The Party (Milk & Sugar Rec) (2005)
- Casanovy – I Need Your Lovin (Milk & Sugar Rec) (2005)
- Freeloaders – So Much Love to Give (AATW) (2005)
- Steve Lawler – That Sound (Joia) (2005)
- Candy Williams feat. Whiteside – Have It All (Milk & Sugar Rec) (2007)
- Seasons Of Love – I Love NY (Boss) (2007)
- Masters at Work – Work (AATW) (2007)
- Yves Murasca – All About Housemusc (Milk & Sugar Rec) (2008)
- Paul Gardner feat. Peyton – You Can't Hide from Yourself (Milk & Sugar Rec) (2008)
- Paul Harris – Broken (2009)
- Alex Gaudino – Watch Out (Ministry of Sound) (2009)
- I Blame Coco – Quicker (Island) (2010)
- Jutty Ranx – Be with You (EMI Music) (2013)
- Francesco Rossi – Paper Aeroplane (2013)
- Ben Pearce – What I Might Do (2013)

=== Other collaborations ===
- Stone & Heller – San Francisco (1997)
- The Mike Milk Project – Extrovated Beat (1997)
- Border Queen – You Spin Me 'Round (1997)
- Mike Milk vs. Steven Sugar – It Looks Like Funk (1998)
- Mike Milk vs. Rat Pack – The Real Boogie (1998)
- Stone & Heller – San Francisco '99 (1999)
- Mike Milk vs. Steven Sugar – Cheesecake (1999)
- Robbie Rivera pres. Rhythm Bangers – Bang (2000)
- MS2 – Running Away (2002)
- Housemates – Without You (2006)
- DJ Dove & Milk & Sugar – Unkind (2006)
- Dino Moran with Milk & Sugar – Gumba Fire (2006)
- Housemates – Can't Get Enough (2008)

=== Compilation CDs ===
- Discohouse Vol. 1 (BMG) (2000)
- Discohouse Vol. 2 (BMG) (2001)
- Vendetta Live Sessions Mixed by Milk & Sugar (Vendetta) (2002)
- 5 Years of Milk & Sugar Recordings (Milk & Sugar Recordings) (2002)
- El Divino Ibiza Mixed by Milk & Sugar (Complete) (2002)
- Ritmo De Bacardi (Ministry of Sound) (2003)
- Pacha Volume 5 Mixed by Milk & Sugar (Good Times Music) (2004)
- Milk & Sugar Summer Sessions 2004 (Milk & Sugar Recordings) (2004)
- Housemusic.de Reloaded (Milk & Sugar Recordings) (2004)
- Milk & Sugar Summer Sessions 2005 (Milk & Sugar Recordings) (2005)
- Milk & Sugar On a Mission 2005 (Milk & Sugar Recordings) (2005)
- Milk & Sugar Summer Sessions 2006 (Milk & Sugar Recordings) (2006)
- Milk & Sugar On a Mission 2006 (Milk & Sugar Recordings) (2006)
- 10 Years of Milk & Sugar (Milk & Sugar Recordings) (2007)
- Milk & Sugar Summer Sessions 2007 (Milk & Sugar Recordings) (2007)
- Milk & Sugar On a Mission 2007 (Milk & Sugar Recordings) (2007)
- Milk & Sugar Summer Sessions 2008 (Milk & Sugar Recordings) (2008)
- Milk & Sugar On a Mission 2008 (Milk & Sugar Recordings) (2008)
- Milk & Sugar Summer Sessions 2009 (Milk & Sugar Recordings) (2009)
- Milk & Sugar On a Mission 2009 (Milk & Sugar Recordings) (2009)
- Housemusic.de Chapter X (Milk & Sugar Recordings) (2010)
- Milk & Sugar Summer Sessions 2010 (Milk & Sugar Recordings) (2010)
- Milk & Sugar Club Cuts (Milk & Sugar Recordings) (2010)
- Milk & Sugar On a Mission 2010 (Milk & Sugar Recordings) (2010)
- Milk & Sugar Miami Sessions 2010 (Milk & Sugar Recordings) (2010)
- Milk & Sugar Summer Sessions 2011 (Milk & Sugar Recordings) (2011)
- Milk & Sugar Club Cuts 2 (Milk & Sugar Recordings) (2011)
- Milk & Sugar On a Mission 2011 (Milk & Sugar Recordings) (2011)
- Milk & Sugar Miami Sessions 2012 (Milk & Sugar Recordings) (2012)
- Milk & Sugar Club Cuts 3 (Milk & Sugar Recordings) (2012)
- Milk & Sugar Summer Sessions 2012 (Milk & Sugar Recordings) (2012)
- Milk & Sugar Winter Sessions 2012 (Milk & Sugar Recordings) (2012)
- Milk & Sugar On a Mission 2012 (Milk & Sugar Recordings) (2012)
- Milk & Sugar Miami Sessions 2013 (Milk & Sugar Recordings) (2013)
- Milk & Sugar Beach Cuts (Milk & Sugar Recordings) (2013)
- Milk & Sugar Summer Sessions 2013 (Milk & Sugar Recordings) (2013)
- Milk & Sugar Club Cuts Volume 5 (Milk & Sugar Recordings) (2013)
- Milk & Sugar Beach Cuts Volume 2 (Milk & Sugar Recordings) (2014)
- Milk & Sugar Miami Sessions 2014 (Milk & Sugar Recordings) (2014)
- Milk & Sugar Summer Sessions 2014 (Milk & Sugar Recordings) (2014)
- Milk & Sugar Club Cuts Volume 6 (Milk & Sugar Recordings) (2014)
- Milk & Sugar #BeatportDecade Indie Dance / Nu Disco (Milk & Sugar Recordings) (2014)
- Milk & Sugar #BeatportDecade House (Milk & Sugar Recordings) (2014)
- Milk & Sugar Winter Sessions 2015 (Milk & Sugar Recordings) (2014)
- Milk & Sugar Miami Sessions 2015 (Milk & Sugar Recordings) (2015)
- Milk & Sugar Club Cuts Volume 7 (Milk & Sugar Recordings) (2015)
- Milk & Sugar Summer Sessions 2015 (Milk & Sugar Recordings) (2015)
- Milk & Sugar Beach Cuts Volume 3 (Milk & Sugar Recordings) (2015)
- Milk & Sugar Winter Sessions 2016 (Milk & Sugar Recordings) (2016)
- Milk & Sugar Miami Sessions 2016 (Milk & Sugar Recordings) (2016)
- Milk & Sugar Summer Sessions 2016 (Milk & Sugar Recordings) (2016)
- Milk & Sugar Beach Sessions 2016 (Milk & Sugar Recordings) (2016)
- Milk & Sugar House Nation Ibiza 2016 (Milk & Sugar Recordings) (2016)
- Milk & Sugar Winter Sessions 2017 (Milk & Sugar Recordings) (2017)
- Milk & Sugar Miami Sessions 2017 (Milk & Sugar Recordings) (2017)
- Milk & Sugar Legends Of House 2017 (Milk & Sugar Recordings) (2017)
- Milk & Sugar Summer Sessions 2017 (Milk & Sugar Recordings) (2017)
- Milk & Sugar Beach Sessions 2017 (Milk & Sugar Recordings) (2017)
- Milk & Sugar House Nation Ibiza 2017 (Milk & Sugar Recordings) (2017)
- Milk & Sugar Winter Sessions 2018 (Milk & Sugar Recordings) (2018)
- Milk & Sugar Stardust 2018 (Milk & Sugar Recordings) (2018)
- Milk & Sugar Miami Sessions 2018 (Milk & Sugar Recordings) (2018)
- Milk & Sugar Summer Sessions 2018 (Milk & Sugar Recordings) (2018)
- Milk & Sugar Beach Sessions 2018 (Milk & Sugar Recordings) (2018)
- Milk & Sugar House Nation Ibiza 2018 (Milk & Sugar Recordings) (2018)
- Milk & Sugar Winter Sessions 2019 (Milk & Sugar Recordings) (2019)
- Milk & Sugar Miami Sessions 2019 (Milk & Sugar Recordings) (2019)
- Milk & Sugar Summer Sessions 2019 (Milk & Sugar Recordings) (2019)
- Milk & Sugar Beach Sessions 2019 (Milk & Sugar Recordings) (2019)
- Milk & Sugar House Nation Ibiza 2019 (Milk & Sugar Recordings) (2019)
- Milk & Sugar Winter Sessions 2020 (Milk & Sugar Recordings) (2020)
- Milk & Sugar Club Cuts 2020 (Milk & Sugar Recordings) (2020)

== See also ==
- List of number-one dance hits (United States)
- List of artists who reached number one on the US Dance chart
