= Jerry Wanker =

Jean-Pierre Poirier (11 September 1956 in Paris – July 2000 in Brussels) also known as Jerry Wanker and Jerry WX) was a Belgian guitarist from Brussels, Belgium, who played in several punk rock bands.

Poirier started out with Chainsaw (the first punk band in Brussels and the French-speaking part of Belgium) together with Micky Mike (aka Snowy Red). After only one 7", Chainsaw called it quits and Jerry moved on for a short stint in X-Pulsion with the Klang-brothers (one split seven inch record with Streets).

His next step moved away from punk, with Digital Dance together with Streets keyboard player Jean-Marc Lederman (best known for his work in The Weathermen). After Digital Dance, he went into different side projects (with ex-Digital Dancers Stephan Barbery and TVIC), to finally find his ultimate love in the garage rock band The Revenge. Like his former partner Micky Mike, he went into production and session work for many known and unknown Belgian bands until his death.

== Bands ==
- Chainsaw (1977–1977)
- X-Pulsion (1978–1978)
- Digital Dance: Jerry WX + Stephan Barbery (Marine, Snowy Red, Instead Of, Ink.) + Jean-Marc Lederman (Fad Gadget, Kid Montana, The Weathermen, Jules et Jim) + Alain Lefevre (Marine, The Durutti Column, Anna Domino, Blaine L. Reininger) + Michel Silverstein (The Names, Noh Mask, Kid Montana) + Tvic (Isabelle et Les Nic-Nacs, Instead Of) + Phil Wauquaire (Fad Gadget, Kid Montana, Polyphonic Size)
- Jung: Jerry WX + Stephan Barbery
- Two Tracks: Jerry WX solo
- Chemical Hours: Anne Kinna (Isolation Ward) + Jerry WX
- North Pole: Jerry WX + Steve Rare
- Isolation Ward: Jean-Pierre Everaerts + Etienne Vernaeve + Stephane Willocq & Thierry Heynderickx
- KlootPer WX+Kloot Per W, guitar duo did a few support slots on the Polyphonic Size 'Tour de l'Est .' tour
- The Revenge: Jerry WX + Chris Altree + Thomas Durt + Phil Lavachery + Paul Hamesse...
- Three Hands: Jerry WX + TVIC & Daniel Wang

== Sources ==
- Jerry WX Discography at Discogs
- Digital Dance Discography at Discogs
