= Klaus Klang =

- Born: Claude Ongena; 26 September 1959 (age 66); Brussels, Belgium
- Occupation: musician

Klaus Klang, real name Claude Ongena (born 26 September 1959), is a musician from Brussels, Belgium.

He was drummer in the punk band X-Pulsion. After that band split in 1978, he went on to found the band Klang with his brother Kurt Klang (bass), Denis Rufin (drums), and Robert Franckson (guitar), trading drums against guitar and singing.

In 1980 Klang won a talent contest by the Dutch music magazine Hitkrant, which led to a record deal with the Dutch label Backdoor. Klang recorded two albums, The Pop Theory (1981) and Dots & Dashes (1982). Shortly after releasing their second album Klang broke up, apparently due to the military obligations of some of the members. Klang never had any big hits but got considerable airplay both in Belgium and the Netherlands.

In 1986 Klaus Klang released a successful solo single, Soul Thing. In the following years he toured extensively, both solo and with his band Neverneverland. In 1991 he released a 6-track mini-album titled Highrise for the Rainland label. In 2014, Klang started playing together again, with brothers Claude and Alain on guitar/lead vocals and bass respectively, Franckson on lead guitar and Paul Englebert (formerly of The Ice Creams) on drums. The album "Meanwhile, in the Cosy Garage" was self-released in February 2015.

Ongena currently works at SmartBe, a non-profit organisation specialised in temporary work contracts for artists.

== Sources ==
- Discogs.com retrieved on 2007-08-07
- Klang brothers: The Belgian Pop & Rock Archives retrieved on 2007-08-07
