= Irish Coffee (talk show) =

- Genre: Talk show
- Presented by: Fred Davis; Paul Kligman; Paul Soles; Bill Walker
- Country of origin: Canada
- Original language: English
- No. of seasons: 1

Production
- Producer: Des Hardman
- Running time: 30 minutes

Original release
- Network: CBC Television
- Release: 24 September 1969 – 28 January 1970

Irish Coffee is a Canadian talk show that aired on CBC Television from 1969 to 1970.

== Premise ==
This Toronto-produced program was recorded on location at Julie's, a restaurant on Jarvis Street located across from the primary CBC facilities. Discussions were informal, frequently involving humorous stories. Episodes were hosted by one of Fred Davis, Paul Kligman, Paul Soles and Bill Walker, featuring such guests as Andrew Allan, Ray Sonin, Ben Wicks and Peter Worthington.

== Scheduling ==
This half-hour program was broadcast on Wednesdays at 10:30 p.m. (Eastern) from 24 September 1969 to 28 January 1970. The program was cancelled due to insufficient viewership and negative critical reception.
