= Irish Coffee (band) =

Belgian hard rock band

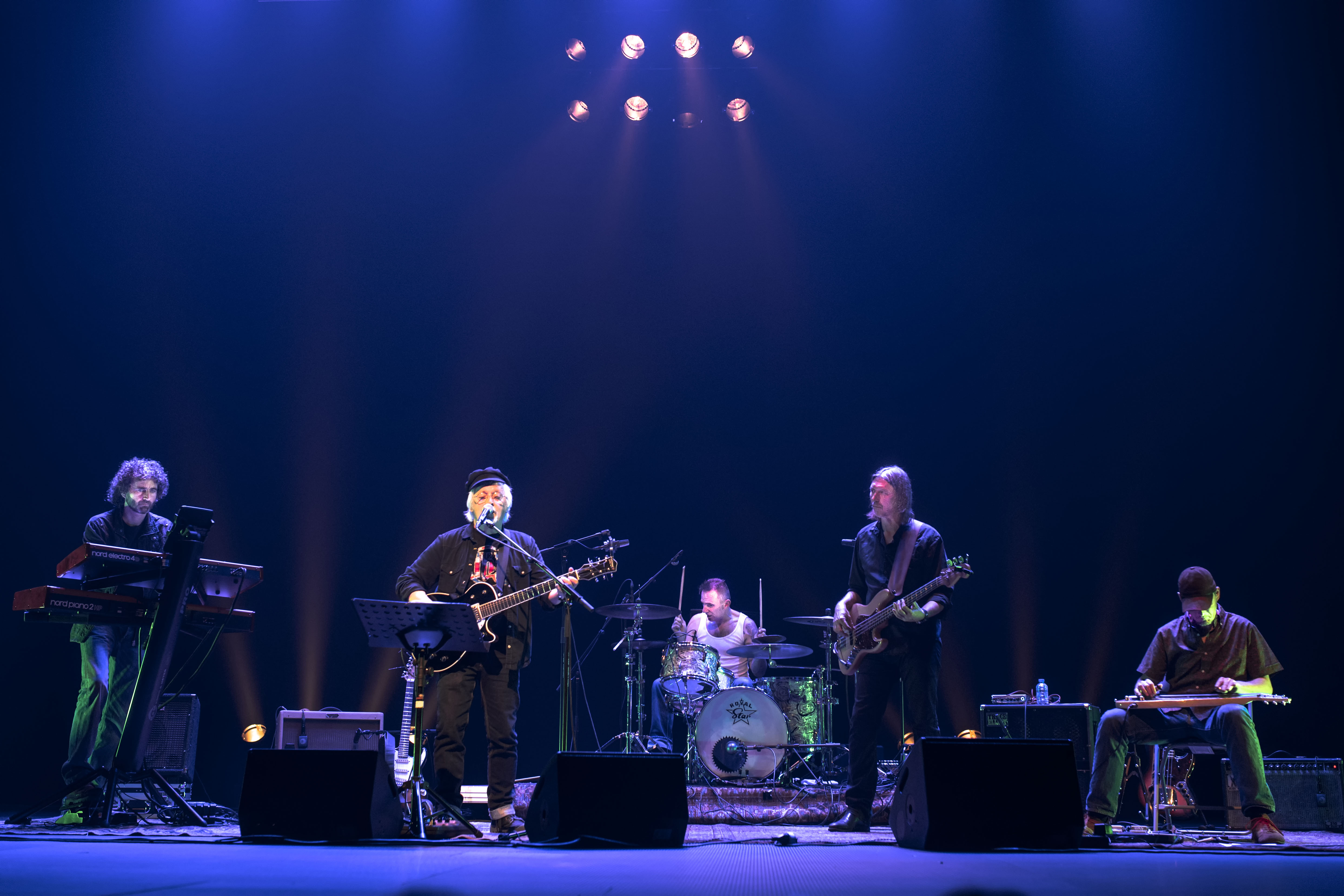
- Irish Coffee (2005)

Background information
- Origin: Aalst, East Flanders, Belgium
- Genres: Hard rock, blues rock, progressive rock
- Years active: 1970–1975, 2002–present
- Labels: Carabine, Triangle, Barclay, Fuzzy, Second Battle, Fuzztone, Starman Records
- Members: William Souffreau
- Past members: Jean Van Der Schueren; Willy De Bisschop; Paul Lambert+ Raf Lenssens; Luc De Clus; Stany Van Veer; Hugo Verhoye; Stef Van Straelen; Franky Cooreman; Kris Van der Cammen

Irish Coffee are a hard rock band from Aalst, East Flanders, Belgium, that officially started playing in 1970. They are best remembered for their single "Masterpiece" which made it to the Belgian charts. The band's music was a combination of hard rock and blues rock, with searing lead guitar parts and strong vocals. The band broke up in 1975 but reformed in 2002 with a new organist and bassist.

== History ==
Irish Coffee's origin can be traced back to another band called The VooDoo, which was formed in 1969.

Before the band was called Irish Coffee they were known as The Voodoo .... 4 members came out of a band where they played with Rocco Granata...remember "Marina"! In the beginning they played only covers by bands such as Deep Purple, Led Zeppelin, The Who, and The Kinks, in a club called "El Gringo", near Aalst, Belgium. There they met Louis de Vries, manager of The Pebbles, with whom they signed a contract. They changed their name to Irish Coffee, with the band at this time consisting of guitarist and singer William Souffreau, guitarist Jean Van Der Schueren, bassist Willy De Bisschop, keyboard player Paul Lambert and drummer Hugo Verhoye. The band went to Antwerp to record their first single, "Masterpiece" (b/w "The Show"), in an 8-track recording studio. "Masterpiece" achieved success on the Belgian charts, reaching number 5 on HUMO magazine's Single National list and was played during concerts and on television shows across Belgium and France. Since they shared the same manager, Irish Coffee played many gigs with The Pebbles, and they also supported well-known bands and artists such as Dr Feelgood, Colosseum, Chris Farlowe, Uriah Heep, Focus, and Chicken Shack, among others.

In July 1971 the band's self-titled album was released on Triangle Records, with all the tracks on the LP having been written mostly by Souffreau and Van Der Schueren. In September 1971, a single coupling the songs "Carry On" and "Child" was released, again on Triangle Records, and these songs were later added as bonus tracks to the 1992 reissue of the Irish Coffee album on the Voodoo label. The band went on to play so many concerts that Hugo Verhoye decided to leave, and he was replaced by Raf Lenssens before the song "Down Down Down" was released as a single at the end of the year. In the spring of 1973, Jean Van Der Schueren left the band to continue his classical guitar studies, and he was replaced by Luc De Clus, who had been playing guitar since the age of five. In June 1974, "Witchy Lady" (b/w "I'm Hers") was released on the Barclay Records label and received quite a large amount of radio airplay but unfortunately failed to reach the charts.

=== Break-up ===
Along with their involvement with Irish Coffee, Lenssens, Lambert, De Bisschop, and De Clus also backed the singer Wim De Craene, and while returning from one of De Craene's gigs in November 1974, they had a car accident. Paul Lambert died and Lenssens was badly wounded, resulting in the end of Irish Coffee. In 1975, the band changed their name to Joystick with the addition of new keyboard player Luc Coppens but this configuration of the band did not release an album. Some of the recorded Joystick material was included on the Irish Coffee reunion album that was released on the Fuzzy label in 2004. In the 1980s, Souffreau did a lot of performances with his cover band Oh Boy, and in 1990 he went solo as a singer and songwriter, releasing several albums. At the end of the 1990s, he formed the rockabilly band Blink It and released two albums with that band. Hugo Verhoye and Luc De Clus were both members of Oh Boy and Blink It.

=== Revival ===
In 1992, the former band members released Irish Coffee recordings on CD on their own Voodoo Records label and they played a reunion show on 9 July 1993 in Aalst. The line-up for this concert included Souffreau, Verhoye, and De Clus, along with Geert Maesschalk on bass guitar and Chris Taerwe on keyboards. The reformed band started playing concerts and clubs in 2002 and had new songs by the end of 2003. "Brand New Day" was released as a promotional single in 2004. Their self-titled album was released by Fuzzy Records in 2004, and is dedicated to Paul Lambert.

Irish Coffee started recording again in 2010 and active since then. The band recorded two new albums: Revisited in 2013 and When the Owl Cries in 2015.

== Band members ==
=== Original line-up ===
- William Souffreau – lead vocals, guitar
- Jean Van Der Schueren – guitar
- Willy De Bisschop – bass guitar
- Paul Lambert – organ
- Hugo Verhoye – drums
- Luc De Clus – guitar on the "Witchy Lady" single
- Raf Lenssens – drums on the "Down Down Down" and "Witchy Lady" singles
- Dirk Dierickx – backing vocals on the "Masterpiece" single

=== Irish Coffee II line-up ===
- William Souffreau – guitar, vocals
- Luc De Clus – guitar
- Stany Van Veer – piano, organ
- Franky Cooreman – bass
- Hugo Verhoye / Stef Van Straelen – drums

=== Irish Coffee III line-up ===
- William Souffreau – guitar, vocals
- Franky Cooreman – bass
- Kris Van der Cammen – drums

=== Irish Coffee IV Line up ===
- William Souffreau - guitar, vocals
- Johan Ancaer - guitar
- Frank Van Laetem - guitar
- Erik Goetvinck - bass
- Bruno Beekmans - drums

== Discography ==
=== Singles ===
- "Masterpiece"/"The Show" (Carabine 66411) 1971
- "Carry On"/"Child" (Triangle BE 61574) 1972
- "Down Down Down"/"I am Alive" (Triangle BE 61766) 1973
- "Witchy Lady"/"I am Hers" (Barclay BE 620044 ) 1974
- "Brand New Day" (Promotional single) 2004

=== Albums ===
- Irish Coffee I (Triangle BE 920321) - Released in July 1971 in Triangle Records in Belgium Only
- Irish Coffee II (Fuzzy 5411499 04702) 2004
- Irish Coffee LIVE (Rockpalast 2005) (Second Battle SB CD 069) 2007
- Revisited III (Nuftone 2012001 2013/01) 2013
- When the Owl Cries IV (Starman Records – SMR054) 2015
