= Siglo XX (band) =

Belgium musician's band

- Origin: Genk, Belgium
- Genres: Gothic rock; post-punk; Darkwave; Coldwave
- Years active: 1978-1990
- Spinoffs: Honeymoon Cowboys
- Members: Antonio Palermo
- Past members: Erik Dries; Dirk Chauvaux; Klaas Hoogerwaard; Chris Nelis; Guido Bos

Siglo XX is a Belgian coldwave,, post punk, and gothic rock group from Genk originally active from 1978-1990. The band has reformed occasionally since 2018.

The group's sound is influenced by music of Joy Division and Factory Records. Siglo XX is one of the more well-known Belgian coldwave bands and by 2010 was considered to have been a key influence on the Belgian music scene. The group's name in Spanish means "twentieth century". It can both be pronounced as Siglo Iks Iks or as Siglo Veinte and reportedly stems from an anarchist movement during the Spanish Civil War and/or a Bolivian mine named Siglo XX that was the scene of social unrest.

Former members Antonio Palermo (guitar) and Klaas Hoogerwaard (drums) formed Honeymoon Cowboys in 2014 and remained active till 2022. During this period, Siglo XX would reunite sporadically for special dates across Europe such as performances at Wave-Gotik-Treffen, W-Festival and Sinner's Day. On some dates, Klaas Hoogerwaard would not participate due COVID-19 pandemic restrictions.

On 2025, Honeymoon Cowboys announced a performance as "Play Siglo XX" and eventual tour under the name of Siglo XX with only Antonio Palermo as sole official member. On January 2026, Klaas Hoogerwaard posted from his Facebook profile that he was not invited nor consulted for this series of performances and urges Siglo XX fans not to support this version.

== Members ==
- Antonio Palermo, "guitar"
- Klaas Hoogerwaard, "drums"
- Dirk Chauvaux, "guitar, bass" (1978–1990)
- Erik Dries, "vocals" (1978–1990)
- Chris Nelis, "synthesizer" (1980–1982)
- Guido Bos, "bass" (1978–1984)

== Discography ==
=== "The Naked And The Death" (7" - 1980) ===
1. "The Naked And The Death"
2. "Lines Of Hope"
3. "Individuality"

=== "Siglo XX" (K7 - 1981) ===
1. "Whispers"
2. "Fall"
3. "Obsession"
4. "Future"
5. "Factory"
6. "Calculated Mistakes"
7. "Good News"
8. "Progress"
9. "Caraïbean Nightmares"

=== The Art Of War (12" - 1982) ===
1. "The Art Of War"
2. "La Vie Dans La Nuit"
3. "Youth Sentiment"
4. "Autumn"

=== Answer (Mini-LP - 1983) ===
1. "Answer"
2. "After The Dream"
3. "The Room"
4. "Until A Day"
5. "Endless Corridor"
6. "Dreams Of Pleasure"

=== Dreams Of Pleasure (12" - 1983) ===
1. "Dreams Of Pleasure"
2. "In The Garden"
3. "Silent House"

=== In The Garden (7" - 1984) ===
1. "In The Garden"
2. "Silent House"

=== Live sides / Studio sides (2 LP - 1984) ===
==== Disc 1 ====
1. "Some Have A Laughter"
2. "Guilt And Desire"
3. "Moving Creatures"
4. "Babies On A Battlefield"
5. "The Fiddle"

==== Disc 2 ====
1. "Fools"
2. "Obsession"
3. "Whispers"
4. "The Room"
5. "Birds"
6. "Into The Dark"
7. "Progress"
8. "The Beginning"
9. "The Art Of War"

=== Re-Released 1980-1982 (LP - 1984) ===
1. "The Naked And The Death"
2. "The Art Of War"
3. "Lines Of Hope"
4. "Youth Sentiment"
5. "Obsession"
6. "Factory"
7. "La Vie Dans La Nuit"
8. "Individuality"
9. "Autumn"
10. "Caraibian Nightmare"
11. "The Fall"

=== It's All Over Now (12" - 1986) ===
1. "It's All Over Now"
2. "Fear"
3. "Babies On A Battlefield"
4. "Death-Row"

=== Till The End Of The Night (12" - 1987) ===
1. "The End Of The Night"
2. "Deadman's Cave"
3. "The Beginning"

=== Flowers For The Rebels (LP/CD - 1986) ===
1. "Sister In The Rain"
2. "Fear"
3. "No One Is Innocent"
4. "Afraid To Tell"
5. "Sister Suicide"
6. "Till The Act Is Done"
7. "Shadows"
8. "Flesh And Blood"
9. "Ride"
10. "The End Of The Night"
11. "Dead Man's Cave"
12. "The Beginning"

=== View Of The Weird (12" - 1987) ===
1. "View Of The Weird"
2. "Silent Crowd"

=== Antler Tracks I (CD - 1990) ===
1. "Answer"
2. "After The Dream"
3. "The Room"
4. "Until A Day"
5. "Endless Corridor"
6. "Dreams Of Pleasure"
7. "Some Have A Laughter"
8. "Guilt And Desire"
9. "Moving Creatures"
10. "Babies On A Battlefield"
11. "The Fiddle"
12. "It's All Over Now"
13. "Fear"
14. "Babies On A Battlefield"
15. "Death Row"

=== Antler Tracks II (CD - 1991) ===
1. "The Naked And The Death"
2. "Lines Of Hope"
3. "Individuality"
4. "Obsession"
5. "Factory"
6. "Caraibean Nightmares"
7. "The Art Of War"
8. "La Vie Dans La Nuit"
9. "Youth Sentiment"
10. "Autumn"
11. "Dreams Of Pleasure"
12. "In The Garden"
13. "Silent House"
14. "The Room" (live)
15. "Into The Dark" (live)
16. "Progress" (live)
17. "The Beginning" (live)
18. "The Art Of War" (live)

=== Fear And Desire (LP/CD - 1988) ===
1. "Fear And Desire"
2. "Everything Is On Fire"
3. "Lost In Violence"
4. "Sorrow And Pain"
5. "35 Poems"
6. "On The Third Day"
7. "My Sister Called Silence"
8. "The Pain Came"

=== Summers Die (12" - 1989) ===
1. "Summers Die"
2. "Waiting For A Friend"

=== Under A Purple Sky (CD - 1989) ===
1. "Baby Divine"
2. "When Will It Be Me"
3. "I Send You My Tears"
4. "Untouchable Flame"
5. "Body Meets Body"
6. "Alice"
7. "Vanity Lane"
8. "City In Dust"

=== 1980-1986 (CD - 2006) ===
1. "The Naked And The Death"
2. "Individuality"
3. "Obsession"
4. "La Vie Dans La Nuit"
5. "Autumn"
6. "Until A Day"
7. "Endless Corridor"
8. "Dreams Of Pleasure"
9. "In The Garden"
10. "Silent House"
11. "Some Have A Laughter"
12. "Guilt And Desire"
13. "Babies On A Battlefield"
14. "It's All Over Now"
15. "The Room" (live)
16. "The Beginning" (Live)
17. "The Art Of War" (Live)

=== Siglo XX (LP - 2010) ===
1. "A1 Whispers"
2. "A2 Fall"
3. "A3 Obsession"
4. "A4 Future"
5. "A5 Factory"
6. "A6 Calculated Mistakes"
7. "B1 Good News"
8. "B2 Progress"
9. "B3 Caraïbean Nightmares"
10. "B4 No Communication"
11. "B5 Into The Dark
