= Red Zebra (band) =

Belgian post-punk band

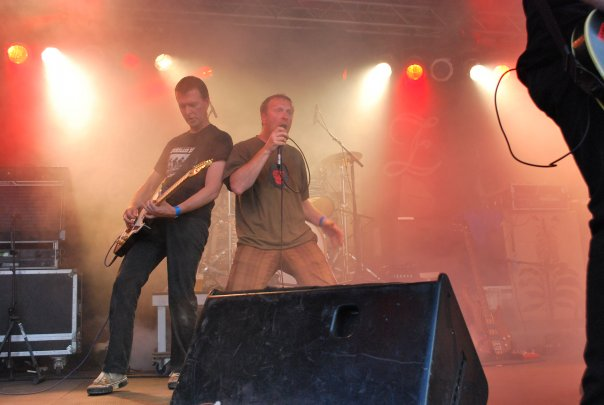
- Red Zebra at the 2009 "Juice Festival" in Veurne.

Background information
- Origin: Bruges, West Flanders, Belgium
- Genres: Post-punk, punk rock, new wave
- Years active: 1978–present
- Labels: Parsley, TA2, Halu, Parsifal
- Members: Peter Slabbynck; Dett Peyskens; Chris De Neve; Geert Maertens; Sam Claeys; Johan Isselée
- Past members: Patrick Provoost; Bruno Melon; Pieter Vreede; Hazy; Jan D'Hondt; Nicolas Delfossea; Jurgen Surinx; Chery Derycke

Red Zebra is a Belgian post-punk group from Bruges.

They started at the end of the 1970s and have the following members: Peter Slabbynck (vocals), Geert Maertens (lead guitar), Vincent Hallez (second guitar and bass guitar) and Johan Isselee (drums). In 1980 they had their biggest hit I Can't Live In A Living room, today still a punk classic. The group still exists and also has a related project today, namely The John Lennon Rifle Club. On 6 December 2010, it was announced that the cooperation between singer Peter Slabbynck and the other members of the group was stopped. They announced this on their page on Myspace. In 2017 they reformed.

Their song "I Can't Live in a Living Room" was used in Asia Argento's 2014 film Incompresa (English title Misunderstood).

== Discography ==
- I Can't Live In A Living Room
- TV Activity
- Bastogne
- Lust
- Polar Club
- Maquis
- Always
- From Ape To Zebra (Parsifal)
- A Red Zebra Is Not A Dead Zebra
- Sanitized For Your Protection
- Mimicry
- John Wayne
- Last Band Standing
- Don't Put Your Head In A Bucket (Parsifal)
- Punks Don't Have Barbecues
- Blue Nothing Day
- The Art Of Conversation
- Kookaburra
- Spit On The City
- I Got The Microphone
- Live In Front Of A Nation
- No Kitchen In The House
- Graveyard Shuffle
