= Vaya Con Dios (band) =

Belgian musical group

- The band in 1987. From left to right: Dirk Schoufs, Willy Lambregt, Dani Klein

Background information
- Origin: Brussels, Belgium
- Genres: Jazz; blues; soul; Latin pop; gypsy; soft rock
- Years active: 1986–1996, 2004–2014, 2022–present
- Label: Ariola Records
- Members: Dani Klein; Jean Michel Gielen; Sal La Rocca
- Past members: Willy Lambregt; Dirk Schoufs
- Website: www.vayacondios.info

Vaya Con Dios (Note: Spanish for 'Go With God', 'May God Go With You", or 'Godspeed'.) is a Belgian music act that stood out for its mixing of styles, as well as the distinctive voice of its lead singer Dani Klein. It was one of the best-selling Belgian music acts, having sold more than 10 million albums and more than 3 million singles.

It was founded in 1986, but after 1991 Vaya Con Dios was, for the most part, a one woman band, centered on singer, lyricist, band leader and producer Klein, reinforced by an ever-changing selection of musicians. In 2014, Klein performed her last international tour under the Vaya Con Dios formula. Vaya Con Dios officially disbanded with their last concert on 25 October 2014, in Forest National. In 2022, Vaya Con Dios returned with a new album.

== Biography ==
Vaya Con Dios was founded in 1986 by Dirk Schoufs, Dani Klein (Danielle Schoovaerts) and Willy Lambregt (known as Willy Willy). Schoufs (1962; double bass) and Lambregt (1959; guitars) were close friends, who had frequently worked as an acoustic duo. Klein (1953; lead singer, lyricist) and Lambregt had previously worked in electronic band Arbeid Adelt !, which lost momentum when band leader Marcel Vanthilt left to become an MTV Europe VJ.

After enjoying a one-off performance as a trio, they decided to form Vaya Con Dios, based on shared interests in gypsy music, jazz and opera – genres they felt were underappreciated in Brussels.

The trio's first single "Just a Friend of Mine" (1987) entered the top 20 in Belgium, and became a top 10 hit in France. This was a milestone especially for Klein, who was now 34, and who had been trying to make it as a singer since age 17. After this first hit, Lambregt left the band, well before the 1988 debut album Vaya Con Dios was completed, and was later replaced by Jean-Michel Gielen. This first album, self-produced by Schoufs and Klein, met with mixed critical acclaim, mostly because it was very eclectic, and difficult to categorize. Nevertheless, it was well received in several European countries, and held three more singles.

The 1990 follow-up album "Night Owls" was again produced by Klein and Schoufs, and produced another three singles. "Nah Neh Nah", an up-tempo mix of Latin and jazz-rock, profited from heavy airplay on MTV Europe. "What's a Woman?", a soul ballad, did well across Europe, and became a number one hit in the Netherlands and Belgium.

In 1991, Schoufs and Klein fell out badly, resulting in Schoufs' departure from the band, only to die months later, on 24 May 1991, at the age of just 29, of a cocktail of medication, alcohol, and drugs.

Klein, left playing with just Gielen and various musicians, nevertheless continued to record a new Vaya Con Dios album, while at the same time doing more and more international performances, due to ever-increasing popularity. In 1992, Time Flies was released, produced mostly by Klein herself. Again three singles were released from the album, the dramatic "Heading For a Fall" doing well in several countries. The album did very well in Europe, reaching number one in Switzerland and getting platinum certification in four countries, eventually proving to be the most successful Vaya Con Dios album. In 1993 it was followed with the first Vaya Con Dios world tour.

In 1995, Klein, by then evidently suffering from a high workload, still managed to record a fourth Vaya Con Dios album: Roots and Wings, from which yet another three singles were released. Recorded at Muscle Shoals Sound Studio in Alabama, the album is even more soul oriented, while at the same time integrating Arab and Indian music influences. Again there was album chart success in several European countries.

In 1996, Klein quit the music business because of complete fatigue, marked by spontaneous hair loss. She returned in 1999 as the singer in the group Purple Prose, which released a debut album that year. Vaya Con Dios returned in 2004 with a new album titled The Promise.

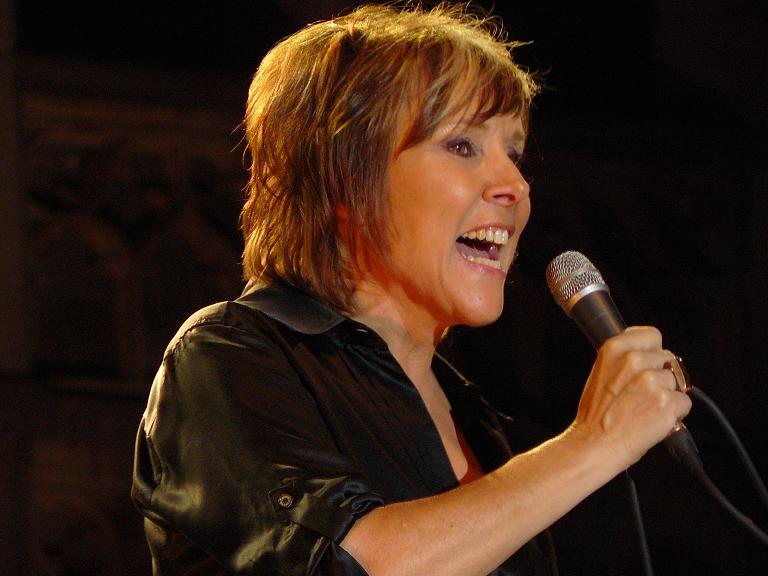
Klein in 2007

In 2006, The Ultimate Collection greatest hits album was released. It featured Aaron Neville on a new recording of the 1990 soul ballad "What's a Woman?" In October 2009, the album Comme on est venu was released, for the first time with all songs in French (one of Klein's first languages). In December 2010, the German DJ Duo Milk & Sugar released a remix of the song "Nah Neh Nah" that reached the Top 10 in the German Media-Control Charts.

In 2013, Klein started a farewell tour, the last Vaya Con Dios tour ever. The last concert was held 25 October 2014 at Forest National in Brussels, but in 2022, after 8 years, the band returned with a new album 'What's a Woman'. In March 2023, Klein revealed during an interview to the Greek music website, SounDarts.gr, that during the COVID-19 pandemic, she had recorded a very last Vaya Con Dios album with original songs in the style and the atmosphere of the band. She also revealed a song title from this album ("Always Something Missing").

== Honours and awards ==
- MTV Video Music Award for International Viewer's Choice nomination: 1989 (song Don't Cry for Louie)
- Edison award: 1991 (album Night Owls)
- World Music Award for World's Best Selling Belgian Artist: 1993
- IFPI Europe Certification: 1999 (album The Best of Vaya Con Dios)
- Zamu Lifetime achievement award: 2006
- Radio 2 Hall of Fame: 2009 (song What's a Woman)
- Music Industry Lifetime achievement Award: 2022

== Discography ==
=== Albums ===
==== Studio albums ====
Year	Album	Peak chart positions									Certifications (sales thresholds)
Year	Album	BEL (FL)	BEL (WA)	NLD	GER	AUT	CH	SWE	NOR	FIN	Certifications (sales thresholds)
1988	Vaya Con Dios: Released: October 1988	—	—	75	49	10	23	9	—	—	FIN: 2× Platinum; SWI: Platinum
1990	Night Owls: Released: April 1990	—	—	5	6	4	1	8	—	—	NLD: Platinum; GER: Platinum; FIN: Gold; SWE: Gold; SWI: 3× Platinum
1992	Time Flies: Released: September 1992	—	—	1	9	4	1	13	11	—	NLD: Platinum; GER: Platinum; NOR: Platinum; SWE: Gold; SWI: 3× Platinum
1995	Roots and Wings: Released: September 1995	1	2	10	33	11	3	16	5	32	BEL. Platinum; NLD: Gold; NOR: Gold; SWE: Gold; SWI: Gold
2004	The Promise: Released: October 2004	12	73	96	—	—	67	—	—	32	
2009	Comme on est venu...: Released: October 2009	7	4	—	—	—	—	—	—	—	BEL: Platinum; POL: Gold
2022	What's a Woman?: Released: October 2022	8	22	—	—	—	—	—	—	—	
2023	Shades of Joy: Released: November 2023	6	18	—	—	—	—	—	—	—	

==== Compilation albums ====
Year	Album	Peak chart positions											Certifications (sales thresholds)
Year	Album	BEL (FL)	BEL (WA)	NLD	GER	AUT	CH	SWE	NOR	FIN	GRC	PRT	Certifications (sales thresholds)
1996	Best of Vaya Con Dios: Released: October 1996	3	3	20	21	15	19	1	4	—	—	—	BEL: Gold; IFPI: Platinum; NOR: Gold; POL: Platinum; SWE: 2× Platinum; SWI: Gold
1998	What's a Woman: The Blue Sides of Vaya Con Dios: Released: November 1998	8	22	—	—	—	—	—	—	—	—	—	
2006	The Ultimate Collection: Released: November 2006	5	9	—	—	—	52	52	—	26	8	7	BEL: Platinum
2014	Thank You All!: Released: 8 December 2014	3	15	80	—	—	—	—	—	—	—	—	BEL: Platinum

=== Singles ===
Year	Single	Peak chart positions							Sales	Certifications (sales thresholds)	Album
Year	Single	BEL (FL)	BEL (WA)	GER	NED	FRA	AUT	CH	Sales	Certifications (sales thresholds)	Album
1987	"Just a Friend of Mine"	17	—	—	—	7	—	—	FRA: 300,000	FRA: Silver	Vaya Con Dios
1987	"Puerto Rico"	15	—	—	—	46	7	—	FRA: 100,000		Vaya Con Dios
1988	"Don't Cry for Louie"	27	—	—	54	—	16	—			Vaya Con Dios
1989	"Johnny" (only released in France)	40	—	—	—	—	—	—			Vaya Con Dios
1990	"Nah Neh Nah"	7	—	16	4	—	25	21			Night Owls
1990	"What's a Woman?"	1	—	11	1	5	7	6	BEL: 95,000	AUT: Gold; BEL: Platinum; NLD: Gold	Night Owls
1990	"Night Owls"	42	—	53	51	—	—	—			Night Owls
1992	"Heading for a Fall"	1	—	29	3	—	10	5			Time Flies
1992	"Time Flies"	8	—	79	51	—	29	30			Time Flies
1993	"So Long Ago"	33	—	67	—	—	—	—			Time Flies
1995	"Don't Break My Heart"	6	8	—	28	—	—	—			Roots and Wings
1996	"Stay with Me"	46	—	—	—	—	—	—			Roots and Wings
1996	"Lonely Feeling"	—	—	—	—	—	—	—			Roots and Wings
2004	"No One Can Make You Stay"	—	—	—	—	—	—	—			The Promise
2005	"La Vida Es Como Una Rosa/Take Heed"	—	—	—	—	—	—	—			The Promise
2006	"Pauvre Diable"	—	67	—	—	—	—	—			The Ultimate Collection
2006	"What's a Woman" (feat. Aaron Neville)	—	—	—	—	—	—	—			The Ultimate Collection
2009	"Les voiliers sauvages de nos vies"	62	34	—	—	—	—	—			Comme on est venu
2010	"Hey (Nah Neh Nah)" vs.Milk & Sugar	10	46	7	5	—	6	4		GER: Gold	
