= Dani Klein =

Belgian singer

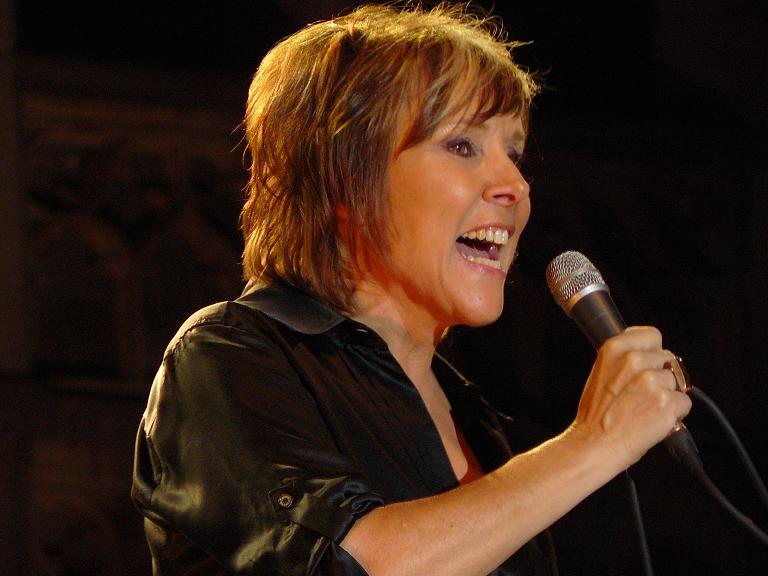
- Born: Danielle Schoovaerts; 1 January 1953 (age 73)
- Other names: Carmen Jones
- Occupations: Singer, lyricist, bandleader, producer
- Known for: Vaya Con Dios; Ladies Sing the Blues; Arbeid Adelt !, Purple Prose, Steelover

Danielle Schoovaerts (born 1 January 1953), known professionally as Dani Klein, is a Belgian singer, songwriter, band leader and producer, and consistently the center and driving force of the band Vaya Con Dios (1986–1996, 2004–2014 and 2022–).

In the 1980s, she was also a singer in electronic group Arbeid Adelt ! with Marcel Vanthilt (better known as a late eighties MTV Europe VJ), Ladies Sing the Blues with Réjane Magloire (Technotronic) and Beverly Jo Scott, and hardrock band Steelover with Rudy Lenners (known from German rock band Scorpions).

In 1999 she was the lead singer in Brussels band Purple Prose.
