= Music of Belgium =

The music of Belgium is a cultural mix where Flemish Dutch-speaking and Walloon French-speaking traditions mix with those of German minorities and of immigrant communities from Democratic Republic of the Congo or other distant countries.

== Early and classical music ==
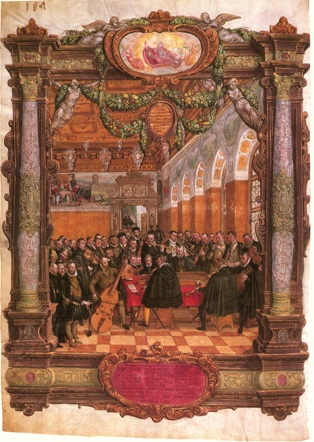
Lassus leading a chamber ensemble (contemporary painting by Hans Mielich)

Many of the major 15th- and 16th-century composers of the Franco-Flemish School—a current of vocal polyphony that played a central role in European art music of the time—were born and bred in the portion of the Low Countries that is situated in present-day Belgium, often in Hainaut. The late medieval composer and music theorist Johannes Ciconia (c. 1370–1412) had been born in Liège, but like many later Flemish polyphonists he spent much of his life working in Renaissance Italy. While it remains unclear why Flemish and other Netherlandish musicians exerted such a strong influence on Renaissance music throughout Europe (with a particularly strong axis developing between Liège and Rome), one possibility is the emphasis that was placed locally on music theory. Guillaume Dufay (c. 1397–1474), who was born near Brussels (he moved as a child to Cambrai, and also worked in Italy), was a key figure of the early 15th-century Burgundian School, and he was considered by his contemporaries to be the leading composer of the age. Another influential figure was Gilles Binchois (c. 1400–1460): probably born in Mons (or nearby Binche) he moved to Lille, the largest city of what is now French Flanders, and unlike many of his contemporaries, he maintained professional connections with the Burgundian court throughout his life. Johannes Ockeghem (c. 1410–1497) is also considered one of the leading composers of the 15th century; a native of Hainaut, he spent most of his career working for the French court.

The migration and influence of Netherlandish composers reached its height roughly between 1480 and 1520, in a period when talented musicians from Low Countries were recruited in courts and cathedrals across the continent, effectively providing the music school of Europe. The music of Josquin des Prez (c. 1450–1521) was considered an aesthetic model for much of the 16th-century High Renaissance; although referred to in his lifetime as a Frenchman (he worked in both France and Italy) he was probably born in Hainaut. Other influential composers of the period whose origins can be traces to the Belgian area of the Low Countries include Jacob Obrecht (c. 1457–1505), Pierre de La Rue (c. 1452–1518), Alexander Agricola (c. 1445–1506), and Gaspar van Weerbeke (c. 1445–c. 1516). Although the emigration of musicians from the Low Countries continued into the second half of the 16th century, the hegemony of Netherlandish influence was on the wane. One of the last truly influential figures of the era was Orlande de Lassus (c. 1532–1594). Another native of Mons, Lassus became one of the most versatile composers of the century, and (according to his entry in Grove) "the best-known and most widely admired musician in Europe."

André Ernest Modeste Grétry was the most famous composer - born in what is now called Belgium - of the 18th century. The 19th century supplied composers like Henri Vieuxtemps, César Franck, Guillaume Lekeu and Eugène Ysaÿe. At the end of the 20th century the most notable Belgian composers were Piet Swerts and Wim Mertens. One of Belgium's most prized people is Adolphe Sax. Adolphe Sax was born in Belgium and created what people know as the saxophone.

In the field of opera, baritones Jules Bastin and José van Dam have become the most famous and internationally successful Belgian opera singers. In the lighter classical genre, Flemish singer Helmut Lotti reached international success with his interpretations of popular opera songs for large audiences.

In the late 20th and early 21st centuries, Belgian artists like Wieland Kuijken and Marcel Ponseele contributed to the Historically informed performance of baroque music, with their ensembles La Petite Bande and il Gardellino.

== Jazz and blues ==
One of the most famous jazz instruments, the saxophone, was invented by a Belgian: Adolphe Sax.

Some known Belgian blues artists are Elmore D (who sings in English and Walloon dialect), and the Flemish Roland van Campenhout (also known as Roland).

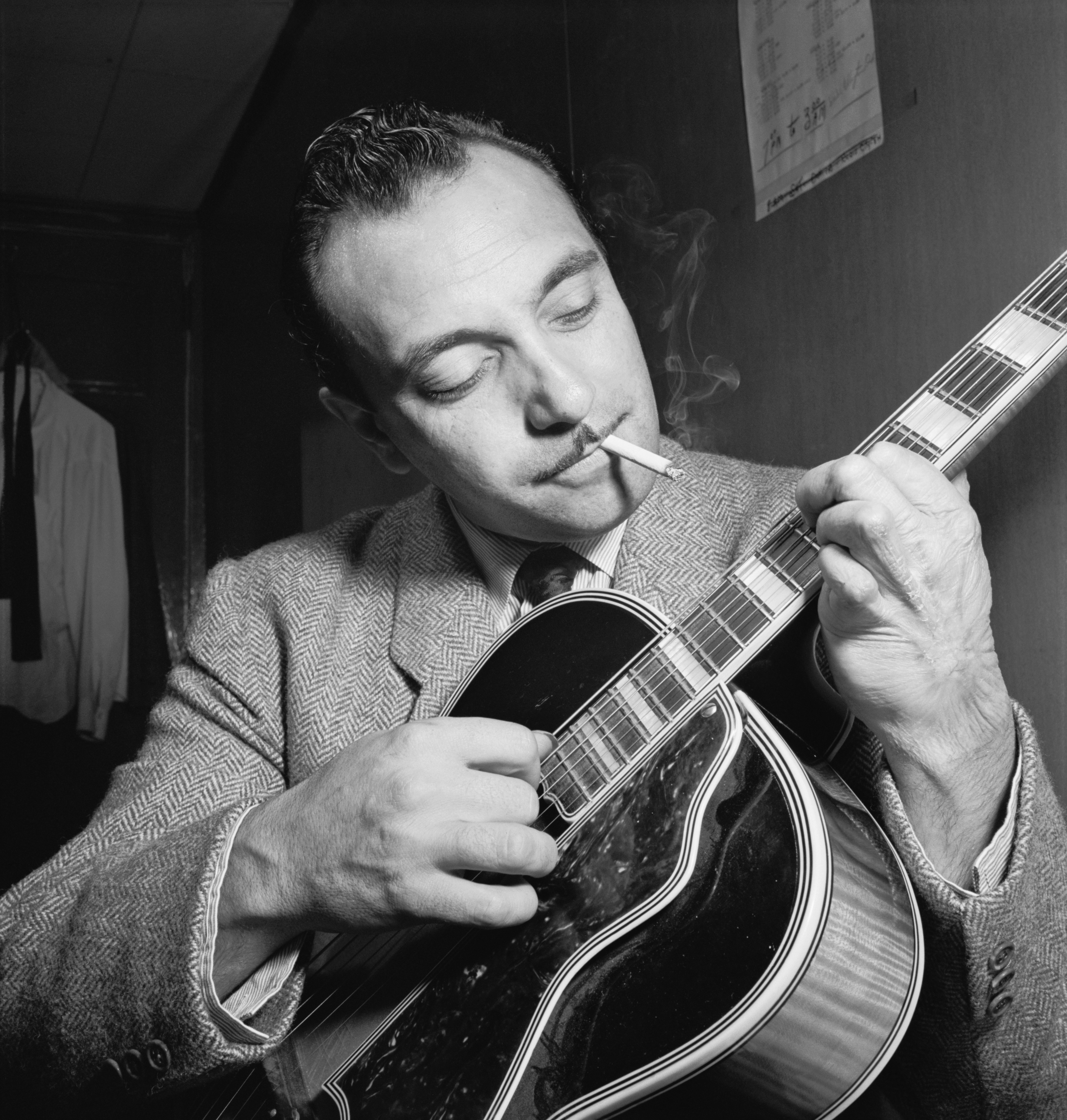
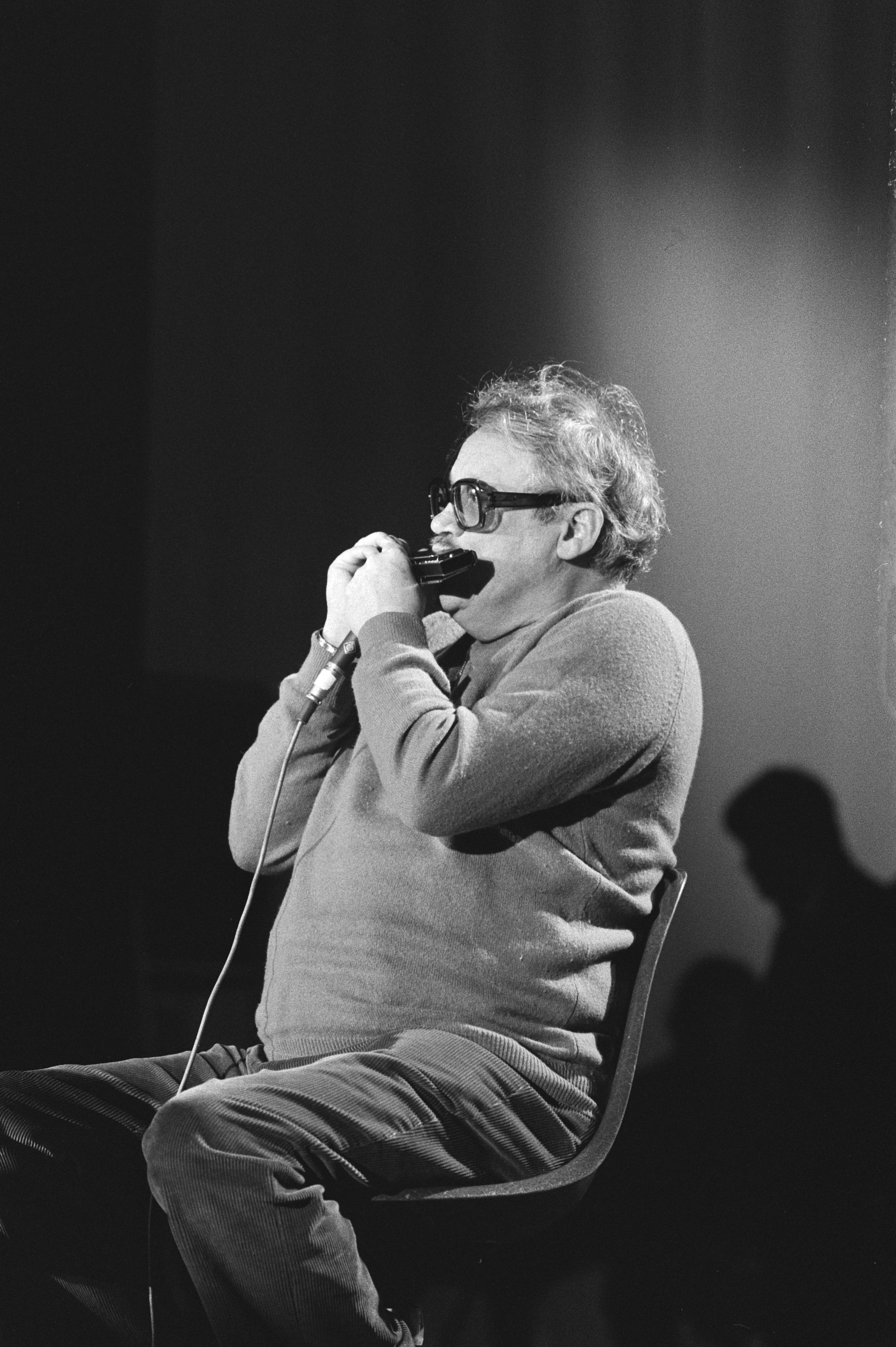
Jazz virtuosos Django Reinhardt (1946) and Toots Thielemans (1979)

In the 1930s, the Belgian romani guitarist Django Reinhardt became one of the first important jazz musicians to be born in Europe, and one of the most important jazz guitarists of all time. In 1949 Toots Thielemans joined a jam session in Paris with Sidney Bechet, Charlie Parker, Miles Davis, Max Roach and others. He moved to the US in 1952 where he was a member of Charlie Parker's All-Stars. Toots Thielemans is often credited by jazz aficionados and jazz critics to be the greatest jazz harmonica player of the century. His music has been used in films like Midnight Cowboy and Turkish delight, and television series such as Sesame Street and Baantjer. Other well known Belgian artists are Aka Moon, Bobby Jaspar, Bert Joris, Philip Catherine, Steve Houben, Octurn and René Thomas, and the first quartertone jazzpianist Seppe Gebruers (b. 1990). He is well known for his experimental approach and exploring microtonality in jazz. In his project 'Playing with standards' he plays with two grandpianos tuned a quartertone apart, and with the well known jazzstandards.

== Folk and other traditional music ==
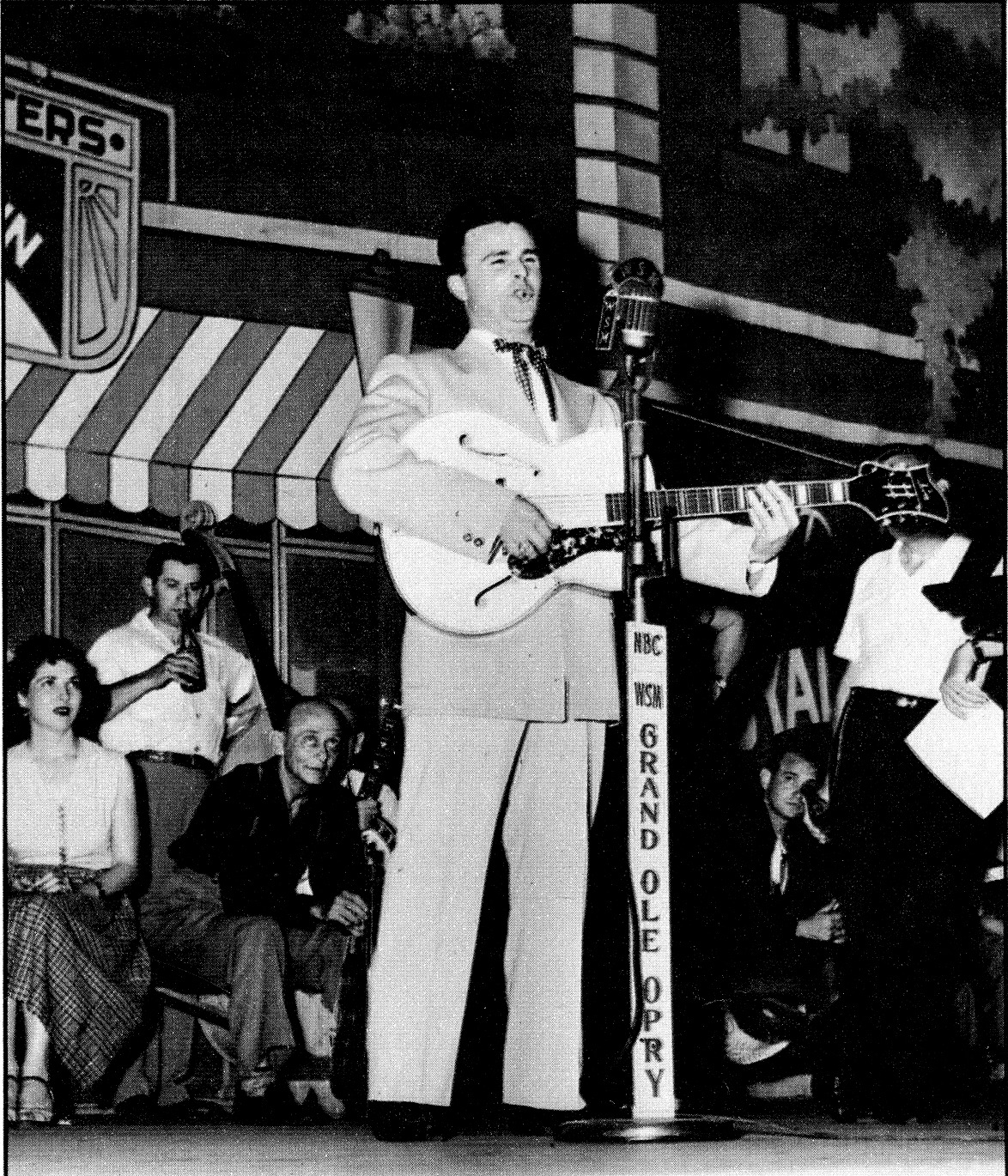
Bobbejaan Schoepen in the Grand Ole Opry, 1953

Bobbejaan Schoepen has been a pioneer in Belgian vaudeville and pop music since the late 1940s. Not only was he the first Belgian singer to manage an international breakthrough, he was also the first to use modern equipment, a personal tourbus and a system of artist sponsoring. He also introduced the first country & western recordings in the Low Countries and Germany. In the 1950s Bobbejaan Schoepen recorded his own absolutely crazy folk music often singing in Flemish dialect. He was also a virtuoso whistler.

From the late 1960s, Flanders saw a vivid revival of traditional music (and, to a lesser degree, of traditional dances) through the efforts of musicians like Wannes Van de Velde, Willem Vermandere, Walter De Buck, Hubert Boone, Herman De Wit and many more. They inspired a new generation of folk musicians through their written and recorded publications, and through festivals and regular summer academies and master classes.

Walloon folk music has not had as vibrant a revival as Flemish, but artists like Coïncidence, Remy Dubois, Luc Pilartz, Rue du Village and Claude Flagel have kept the folk traditions alive.

Contrary to general evolution, there has always been great openness across the so-called linguistical barriers - there are many collaborations between Belgian musicians of different language.

== Chanson ==
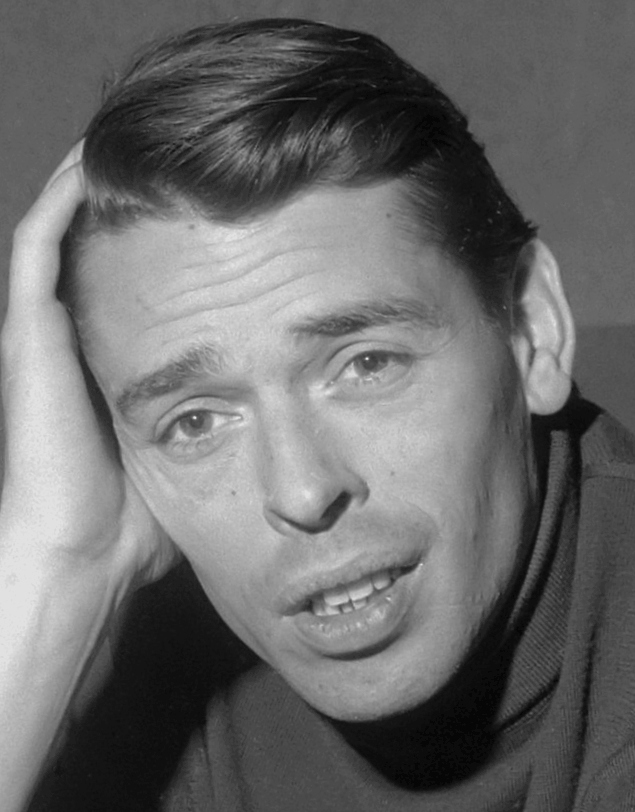
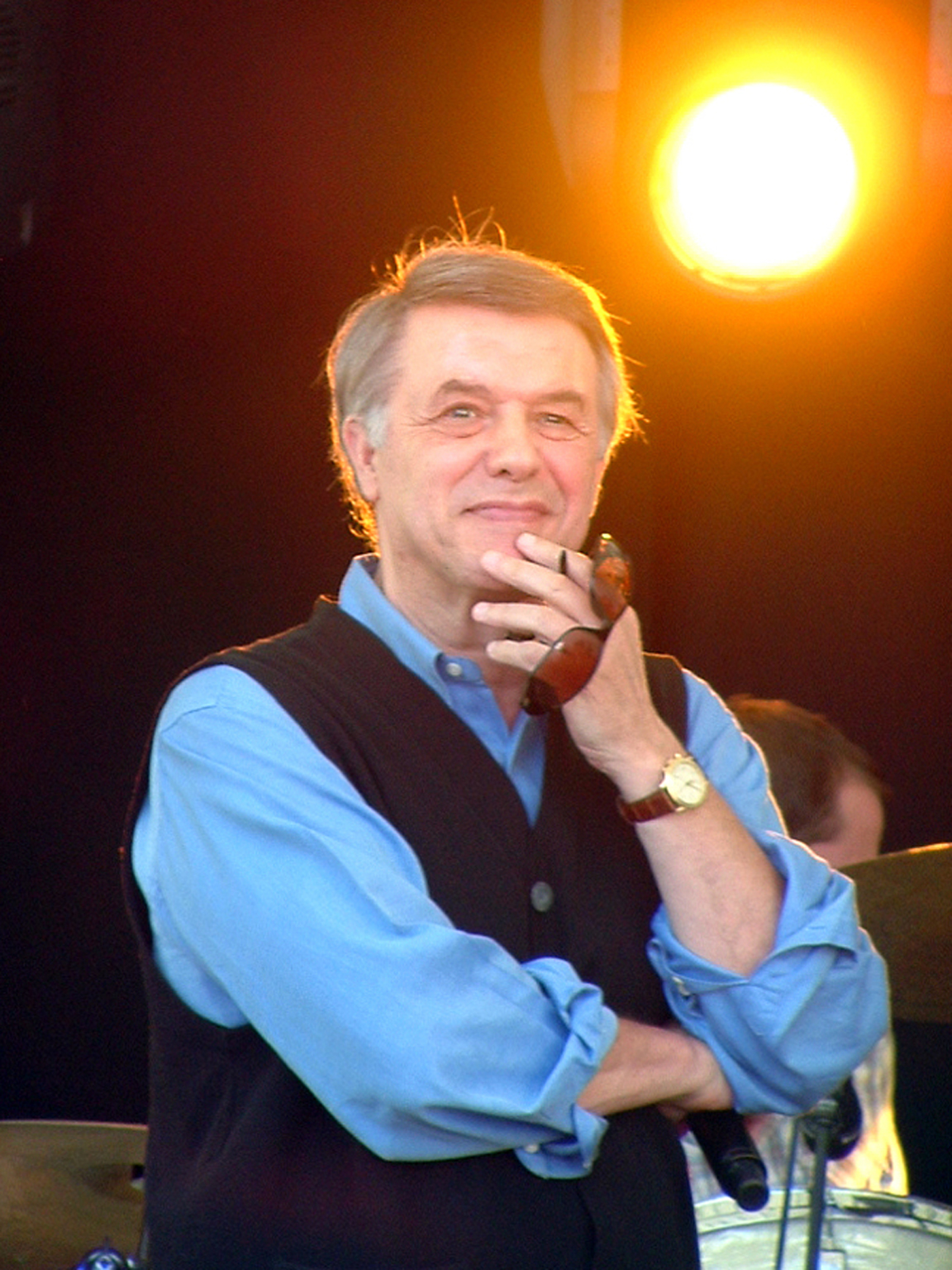
French-speaking Jacques Brel (1962) and Salvatore Adamo (2007) achieved worldwide success

The greatest Belgian chansonnier was Jacques Brel, whose classic songs have been covered by several international artists such as David Bowie, Frank Sinatra, Dusty Springfield, Scott Walker and Terry Jacks. Despite his mainly French-language oeuvre, Salvatore Adamo achieved worldwide success from the 1960s onwards. While Brel influenced artists worldwide artistically, Adamo was enormously successful commercially. By the second half of the sixties, Adamo had become the world's second best-selling musician after The Beatles. Others like Pierre Rapsat, Arno, Maurane, Axelle Red and Lara Fabian have also enjoyed some success in other French-speaking countries.

The French chanson style also inspired some Dutch-speaking singers like Kor Van der Goten and Jan De Wilde.

== Dialect singing ==
With the 1960s folk revival came a new interest into dialect singing. Pioneer Wannes Van de Velde soon got a following, mostly in the folk and traditional styles, but eventually extending into the comedy rock of The Clement Peerens Explosition and the hip-hop of 't Hof van Commerce (or Flip Kowlier solo). Others, while mostly performing in standard Dutch, will include an occasional phrase or even a complete song in dialect (ex. Johan Verminnen, Rue des Bouchers and Raymond van het Groenewoud, Je veux de l'amour).

== Pop and rock ==
During 1950 through 1960 and following decades the most popular, enduring, commercial and critical successful Flemish singer was Will Tura, whose most well known hit in Flanders is "Eenzaam zonder jou" (1963) ("Lonely without you").

The most popular and enduring artists in Flanders and the Netherlands who sing in either their Flemish dialect or standard Dutch are Eddy Wally, Raymond van het Groenewoud, Willem Vermandere, De Kreuners, Clouseau, Gorki (band), Noordkaap, and De Mens.

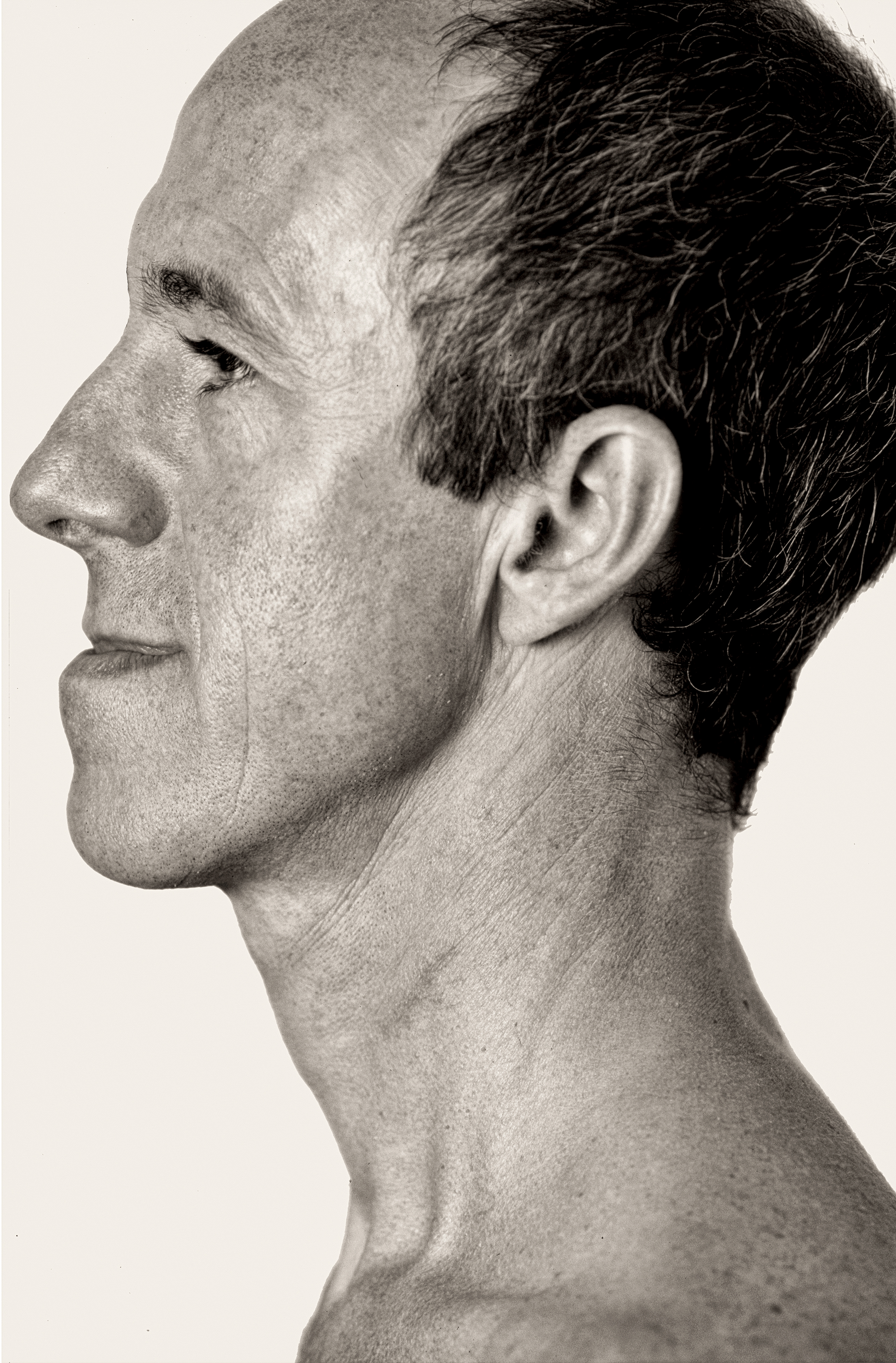
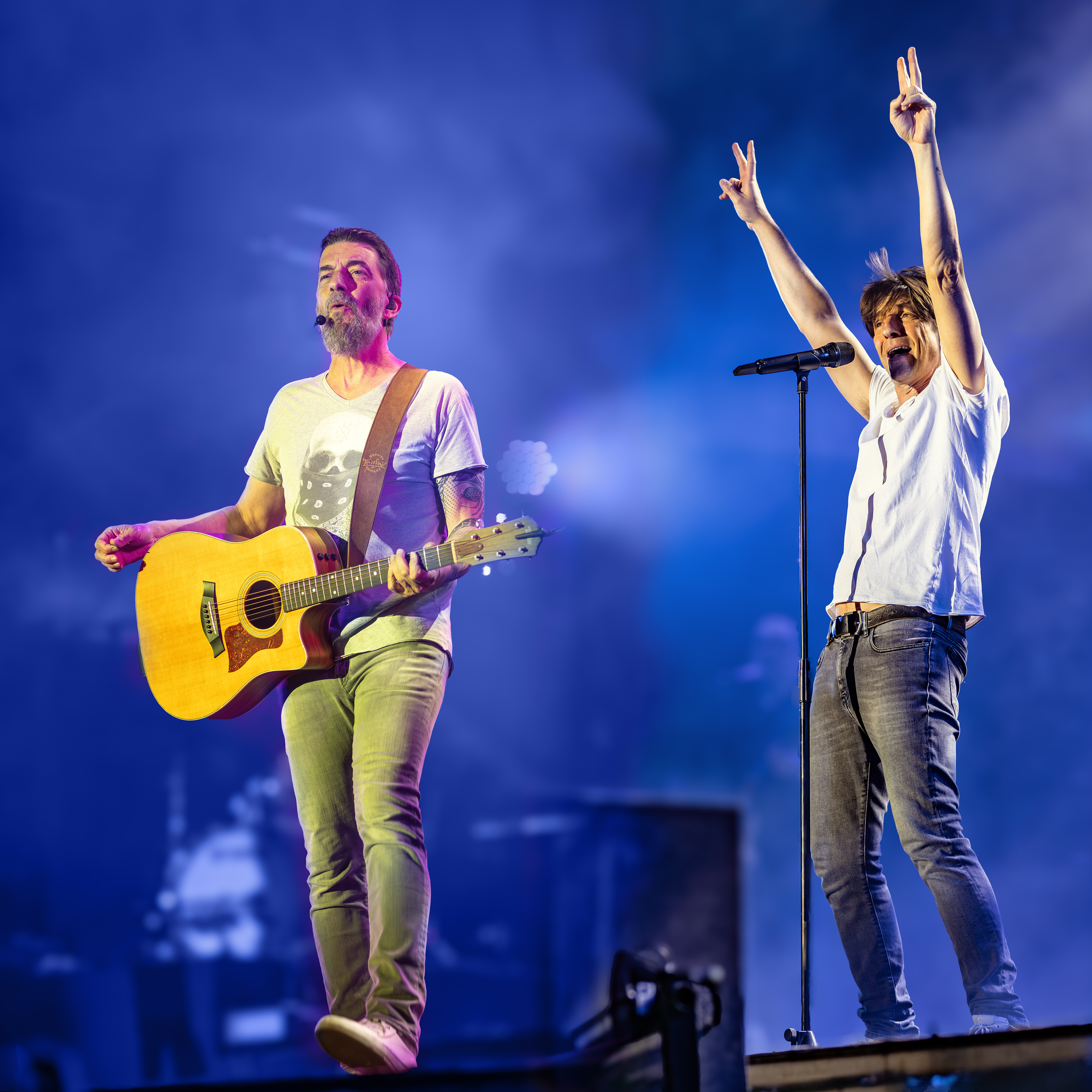
Flemish artists Raymond van het Groenewoud (1995) and Clouseau (2024) have been popular in Flanders and the Netherlands for decades

In 1959 the Belgian singer of Italian descent Rocco Granata scored a big European hit with "Marina". The singing nun Soeur Sourire had an international number one hit in 1963 with Dominique. She won a Grammy Award for best gospel recording in 1964 for the song, and was nominated for several other categories, including Album of the Year. When folk and hippie culture finally hit a chord around the world the groups The Pebbles ("Seven Horses in the Sky", "I Get Around") and The Wallace Collection ("Daydream") had considerable international success. Irish Coffee, a hard rock band from Aalst also achieved considerable local success in the same era. Due to a lack of really professional management these few pop groups failed to build out a durable international career, a trend which continued during the 1970s when the most successful artists sang in their native tongue. The only real new international successful artist was Plastic Bertrand. (See "Punk" below).

Real international success for Belgian acts began in 1980 with the rock group TC Matic. They were quite popular in the rest of Europe with numbers like "Oh La La La" and "Putain putain". Lead singer Arno later started his own successful solo career. Many groups and artists had considerable success in other countries, but they usually did not reach out much further than West Europe. Notable exceptions were Maurane, Jo Lemaire, Soulsister ("The Way To Your Heart", 1987) and Vaya Con Dios ("Puerto Rico", 1988, "What's a Woman?", 1990).

=== Indie rock ===
In the early 1990s many alternative rock bands finally started to achieve larger international acclaim and success. In Antwerp, a lively indie rock scene sprouts where dEUS is probably the most famous, next to other people and groups like Zita Swoon (formerly Moondog Jr), Evil Superstars, Kiss My Jazz, Dead Man Ray, K's Choice ("Not an Addict"), Admiral Freebee, and Die Anarchistische Abendunterhaltung. In the noise genre Antwerp houses the pioneer band Club Moral. Ghent also has a booming indie scene: Absynthe Minded, Das Pop, Millionaire, Zornik, Awaken and the successful Soulwax bring indie rock with a slightly rougher edge than their Antwerp fellows, while The Vogues (Brussels) have a British-influenced sound. Other popular artists are Triggerfinger, Gabriel Ríos and Ghinzu.

=== Punk ===
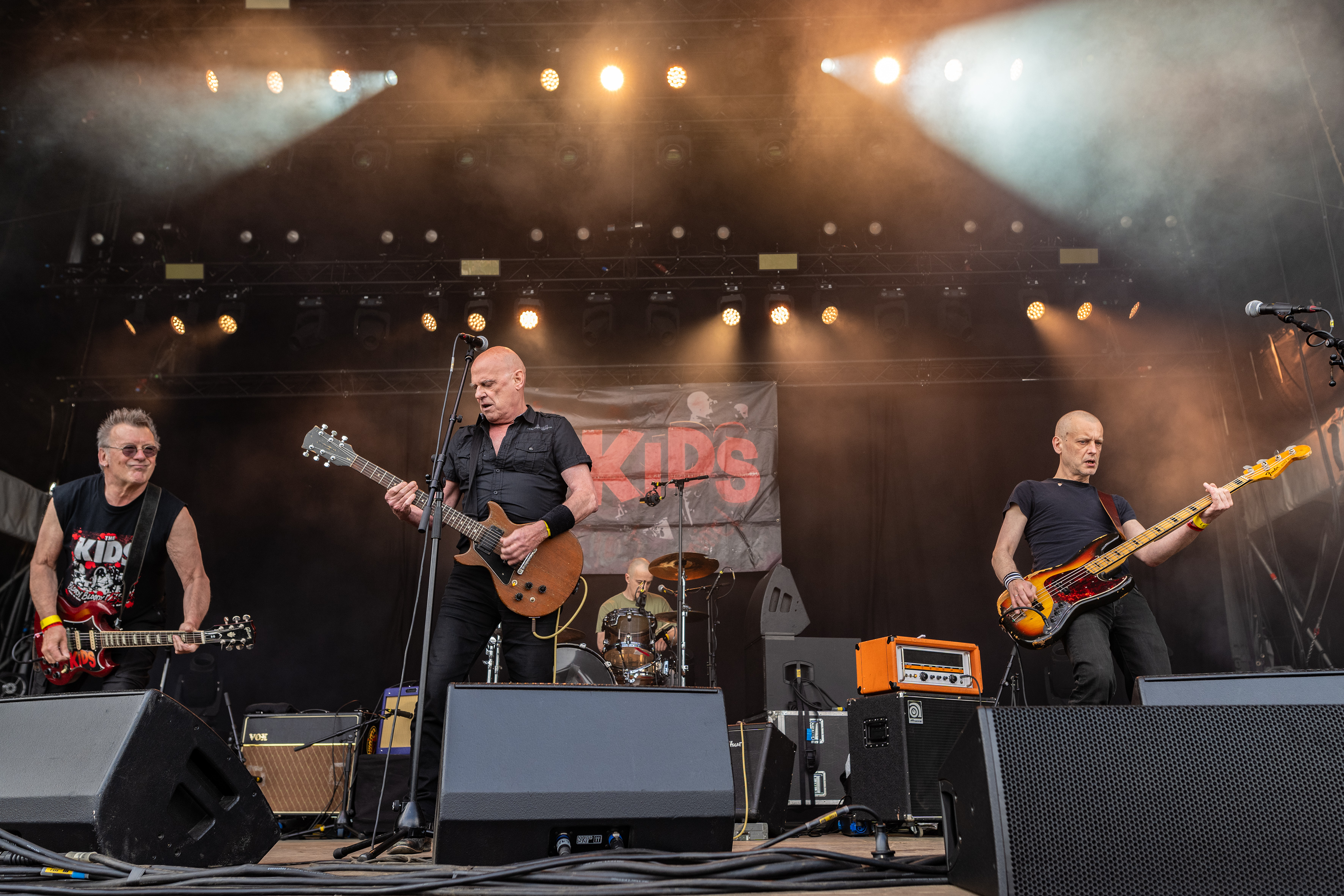
Punk band The Kids in 2024

The most well-known Belgian punk bands are Chainsaw, The Kids ("Fascist Cops", "There will be no Next Time"), Janez Detd, Funeral Dress and Plastic Bertrand who had a worldwide hit with "Ça Plane Pour Moi" (1978). Lou Deprijck, the song's co-writer and producer, later also turned out to be the actual singer of the song. He previously already had international fame with his band Two Man Sound ("Charlie Brown", "Disco Samba").

West Flanders was home to the "H8000" (pronounced "Hate-Thousand") underground hardcore punk scene during the 1990s. Bands within the scene took heavily from heavy metal, and followed straight edge and vegan lifestyles. Some bands helped to pioneer the development of metalcore and then later on melodic metalcore and deathcore. Some groups from the scene include Congress, Liar, Blindfold, Shortsight, Regression and Spirit of Youth. Good Life Recordings signed and released much of the music for the scene.

=== Metal ===
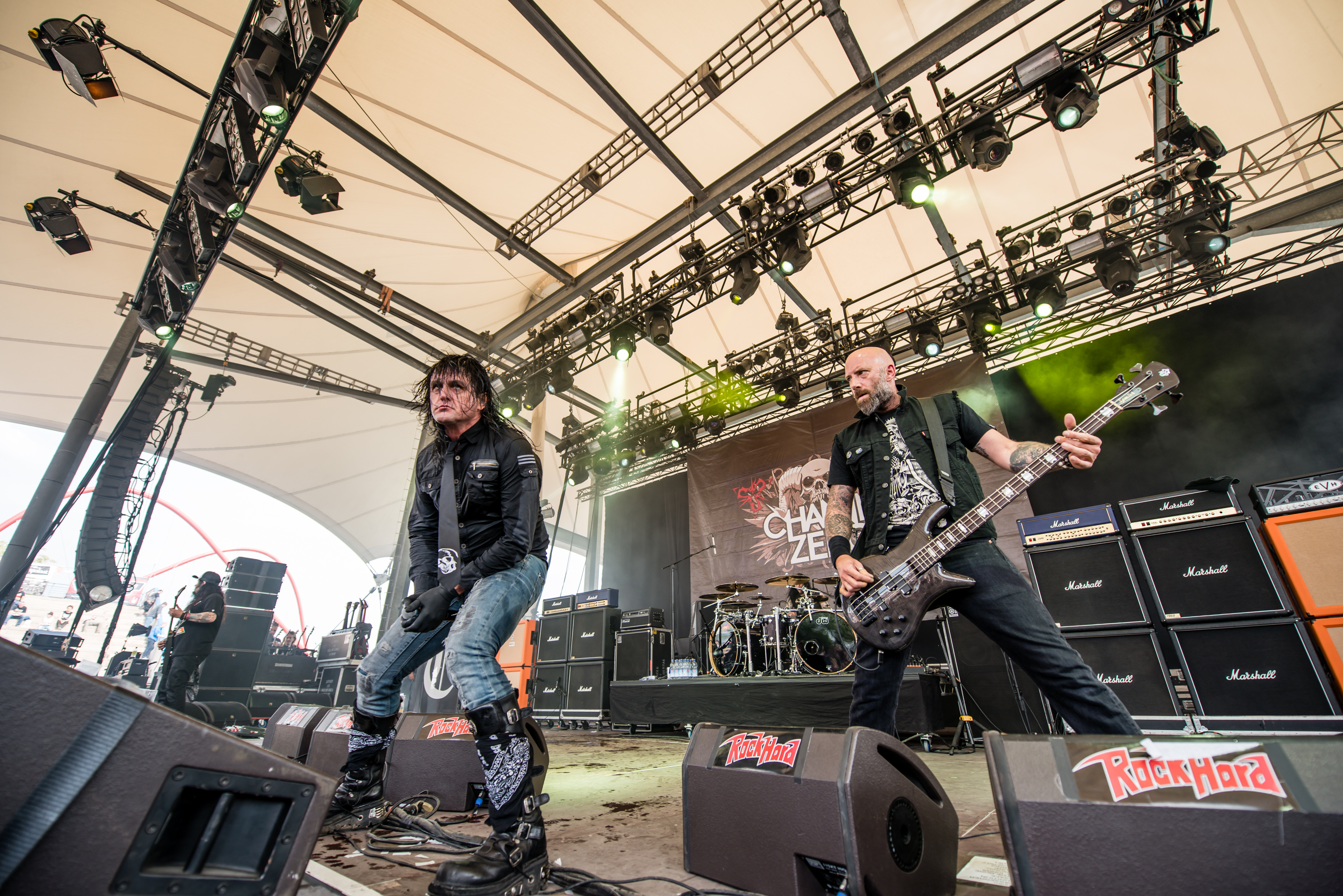
Channel Zero performing in 2015

The most well-known Belgian metal bands include death metallers Aborted, Ostrogoth, Killer, Emeth, Fractured Insanity, Warbeast Remains and Serial Butcher, grindcore quartet Leng Tch'e, Agathocles, black metal bands Enthroned, Saille and Ancient Rites, folk metal band Ithilien, heavy metal band Channel Zero and melodic black/doom metal band Amenra.

== Hip-hop ==
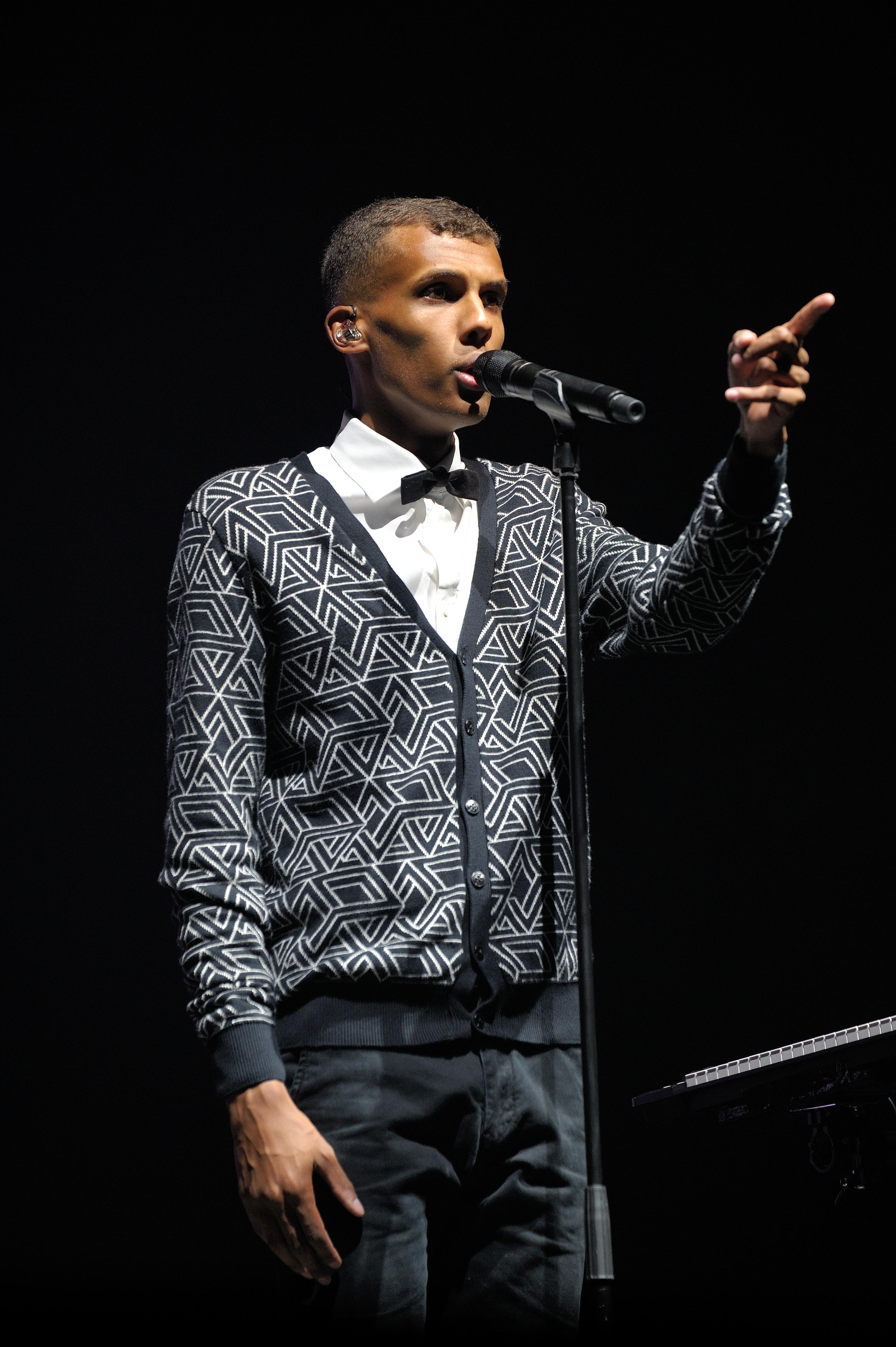
Stromae in France, 2014

Belgium's hip hop scene is partly rooted in the immigrant communities from Africa and Italy. Belgium, like neighbouring France, controlled African countries like the Democratic Republic of the Congo (formerly Zaire), Rwanda, and Burundi until the early 1960s. Like in France, immigrants from these countries started to study and live in Belgium.

Today, the Belgian hip hop scene is growing. Rappers like Coely, Roméo Elvis, Stromae and Damso are achieving commercial success in their country and abroad. Other contemporary rappers/formations are Stikstof, Woodie Smalls, L'Or Du Commun and Isha.

Hooverphonic is a famous Belgian trip hop band, which scored hits with "Eden" and "Mad About You".

== Electronic music ==
The earliest Belgian electronica act was Telex ("Moskow Diskow", "Euro-Vision"). Frontman Marc Moulin was later moved on to pursue a solo career.

At the end of the 1980s Belgium started to play a very important role in the development of Techno music. The group Technotronic had a massive international hit with "Pump Up The Jam". A new genre, new beat was created and scored international hits with acts like The Confettis ("The Sound of C.", 1988). Bands like Front 242, Snowy Red, Public Relation and A Split-Second played a part in making the music genre EBM popular.

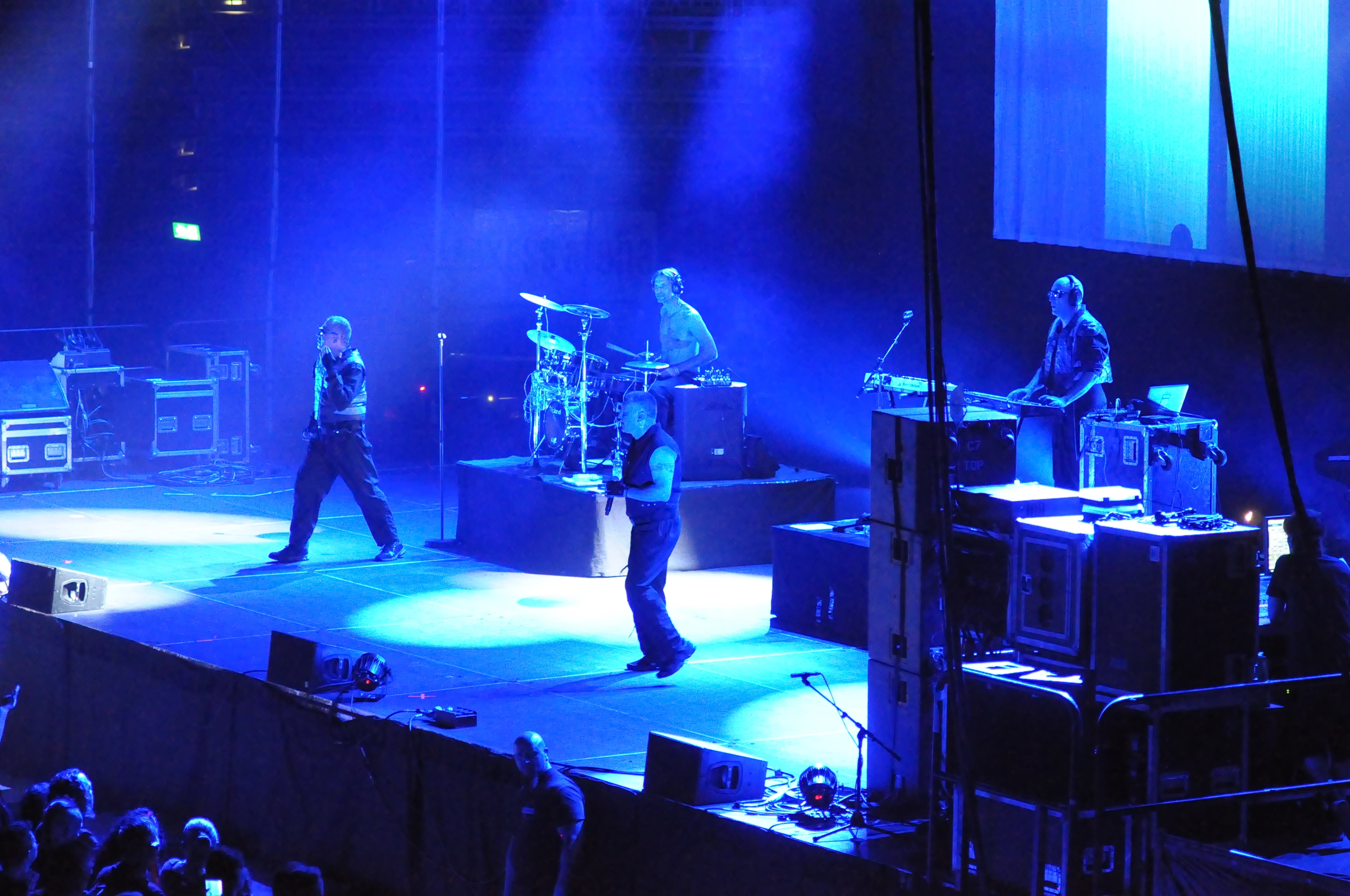
Front 242 concert in Germany, 2015

In the 1990s, acts like the partially Dutch-Belgian 2 Unlimited ("No Limit") and the Flemish Lords of Acid and Praga Khan, were internationally successful. Other internationally renowned Belgian dance acts are 2 Many Dj's (a spin-off from the group Soulwax), The Glimmers (formerly Mo & Benoelie), Junior Jack & Kid Creme, Sylver, Milk Inc., Kate Ryan, Lasgo, Ian Van Dahl, and Vive La Fête. The 2000s saw a proliferation of experimental electronic Belgian artists. Jan Robbe, Kaebin Yield and Sedarka are key innovators of the "flashcore" sound, and others including Sickboy of the Belgian Breakcore Gives Me Wood collective were crucial in the development of breakcore and Mashup. Nowadays, singer Stromae has been a musical revelation in Europe and beyond, having great success. The 2010s saw the formation of dubstep duo Ganja White Night.

In 2015 Lost Frequencies had an international hit with his reworked version of Are You with Me, a song originally by Easton Corbin. Lately Angèle has also arisen to the international stage.

== African music ==
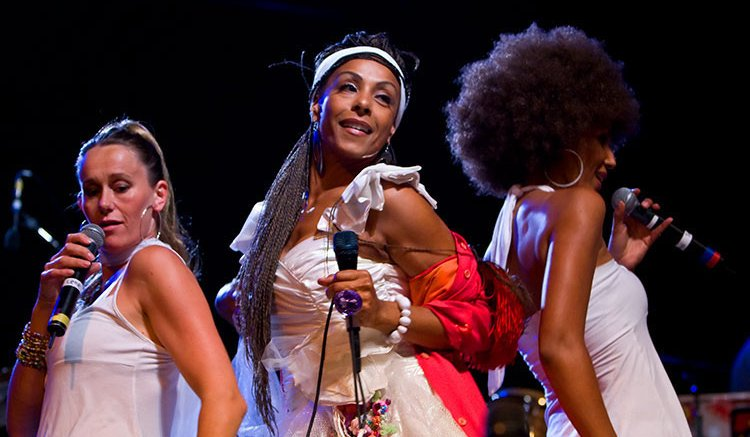
Zap Mama performing in Seattle, 2007

Since the early 1980s, African musicians have played an important part on the Belgian scene, especially those from the former Belgian colony of Congo. Congolese-Belgian Princesse Mansia M'Bila, Rwandan-Belgian Cécile Kayirebwa and Dieudonné Kabongo led this wave that soon incorporated Argentine tango music, Moroccan oud and other music from around the world. The 1990s saw the emergence of Zap Mama, a group of Congolese-Belgian women who played a fusion of Pygmy and other African music with European influences. Belgium's African music is majorly rooted in the immigrant communities from Africa. Belgium, like its neighbour France, exerted political control over African countries. Because of this, African music has had a significant amount of growth in the small European country as well as an increase in popularity.

== See also ==
- Belgium in the Eurovision Song Contest
- List of Belgian bands and artists
- List of Belgian classical composers
- List of best-selling Belgian music artists
- Popcorn (music style)
- Union of Belgian Composers
