= Disco Samba =

1977 single by Two Man Sound

Single by Two Man Sound

from the album Disco Samba
- B-side: "Pogo Pogo"
- Released: 1977
- Genre: Latin pop; disco
- Length: 3:10
- Label: Attic; Durium; Warner Bros.
- Songwriter(s): Lou Deprijck; Jorge Ben; Edu Lobo; Luiz Gonzaga; Jackson do Pandeiro; Miguel Gustavo; Jorge Veiga; Ary Barroso; Antonio Carlos; Wando; Haroldo Lobo; Benito di Paula; Rodolfo de Souza; Olho Verde; Paulo Brazão; Manuel Rosa
- Producer(s): Roland Kluger

Two Man Sound singles chronology
"Charlie Brown" (1976)	"Disco Samba" (1977)	"Dancing Man" (1977)

Music video
- "Disco Samba" (1977) on YouTube

"Disco Samba" is a 1977 single by the Belgian band Two Man Sound.

The track is a medley of songs by Brazilian artists like Jorge Ben, Edu Lobo, Jackson do Pandeiro and Benito di Paula.

The song was successful in Europe, and also in Mexico, where a full-length album released to capitalise on the song's success sold 800,000 copies. It has been re-released several times.

== Charts ==
Chart (1986)	Peak position
Belgium (Ultratop 50 Flanders)	8
Netherlands (Single Top 100)	7
