= Vicky Rosti =

Finnish singer of popular music (born 1958)

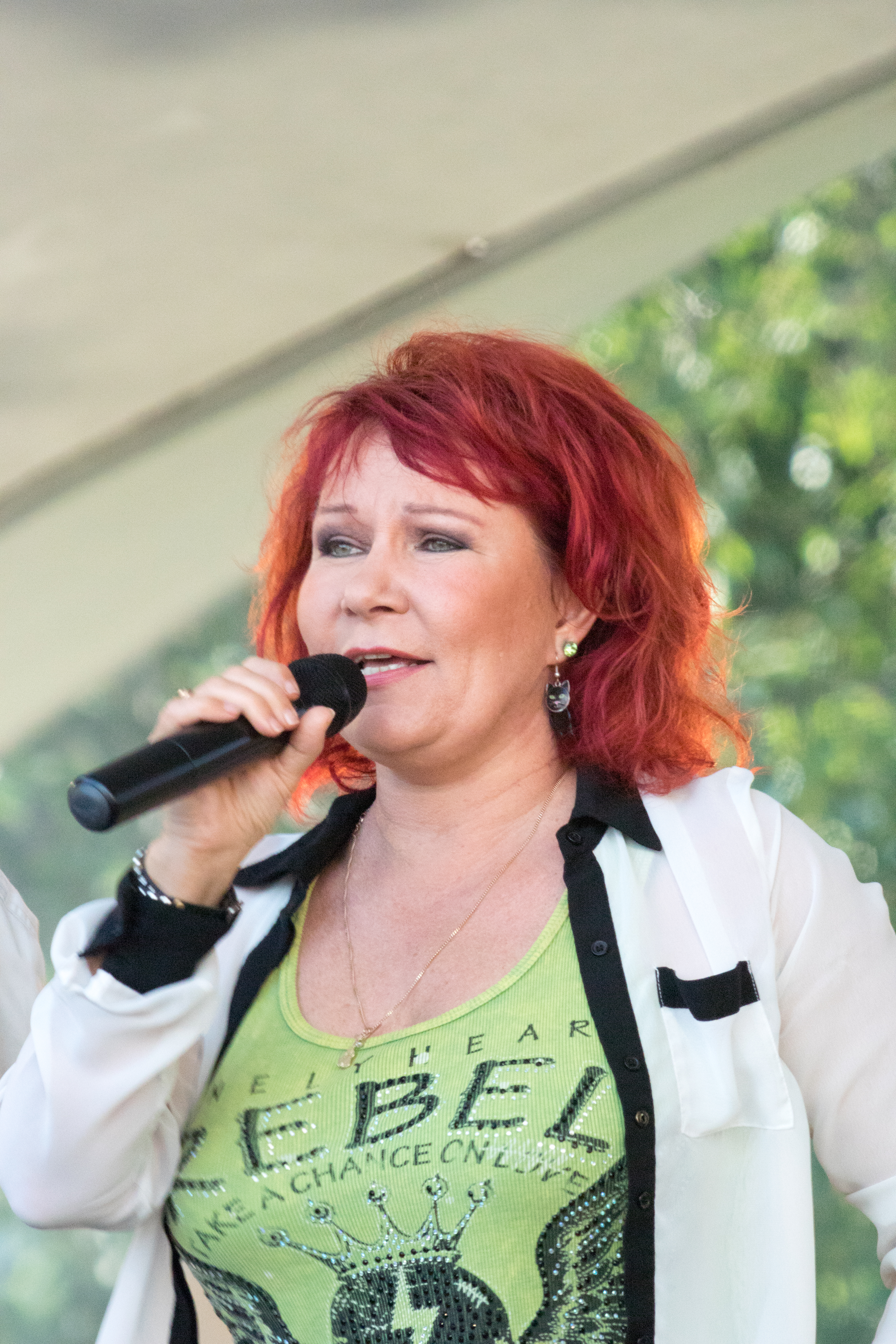
Vicky Rosti

Virve Hannele "Vicky" Rosti (born 10 November 1958) is a Finnish singer of popular music. Her most famous songs include "Kun Chicago kuoli" (the debut single from 1975, a Finnish language cover version of "The Night Chicago Died" by Paper Lace), "Tuolta saapuu Charlie Brown" ("Charlie Brown" by Benito di Paula), "Menolippu" ("One Way Ticket"), "Oon voimissain" ("I Will Survive"), "Tunnen sen täysillä taas" ("Total Eclipse of the Heart"), "Sata salamaa" (One hundred lightnings) and "Jolene". During her career, Rosti has sold over 75,000 certified records, which places her among the top 50 best-selling female soloists in Finland.

Rosti was born in Helsinki, and represented her home country in the Eurovision Song Contest 1987 in Belgium. She sang "Sata salamaa", composed by Petri Laaksonen. The song finished 15th out of 22, scoring 32 points.

Rosti currently sings in the band Menneisyyden Vangit together with Freeman.

In 2015, she features on the fourth season of the Nelonen series Vain elämää.

== Discography ==
=== Studio albums ===
- Vicky (1975)
- 1-2-3-4-tulta! (1976) (Gold 1976, Platinum 1977)
- Vickyshow (1977)
- Tee mulle niin (1978)
- Oon voimissain (1979)
- Sata salamaa (1987)
- Tunnen sen täysillä taas (1992)
- Sydämeen kirjoitettu (2000)
- Vicky Rock Vol. 1 (2007)
- Pitkästä aikaa (2014)

=== Collections ===
- Parhaat (1989)
- 20 suosikkia – Kun Chicago kuoli (1995)
- 20 suosikkia – 1-2-3-4-tulta! (2000)
- Parhaat (2004) (Gold 2004)

Preceded by Kari Kuivalainen with "Never the End"	Finland in the Eurovision Song Contest; 1987	Succeeded by Boulevard with "Nauravat silmät muistetaan"
