= J. J. Lionel =

Belgian musician (1947–2020)

Jean-Jacques Lionel

Background information
- Birth name: Jean-Jacques Blairon
- Born: 9 August 1947; Binche, Belgium
- Died: 14 July 2020 (aged 72); Comines-Warneton, Belgium
- Genres: Alternative rock, rock and roll, gospel, Blues
- Occupation: Singer
- Instrument: Bass
- Years active: 1970–2020
- Formerly of: Wallace Collection

Jean-Jacques Blairon (9 August 1947 – 14 July 2020) was a Belgian musician active in the 1980s under the name J. J. Lionel.

He is best known for La Danse des canards, released in 1981. This version became the best-selling French-language song in France in the 1980s. It appeared in the 1983 Guinness Book of Records with 2,500,000 copies sold. Thirty years after the song's release, this amount had risen to 3.5 million.
