= Daydream (Wallace Collection song) =

- One of variants of original French single picture sleeve

Single by Wallace Collection

from the album Laughing Cavalier and Wallace Collection
- B-side: "Baby I Don't Mind"
- Released: 1969
- Recorded: 1969; Abbey Road Studios, London
- Genre: Symphonic rock
- Length: 4:10
- Label: EMI/Odeon
- Songwriters: Sylvain Vanholme; Raymond Vincent; Stephen Mann; David MacKay
- Producer: David MacKay

"Daydream" is a song recorded in 1969 by the Belgian band Wallace Collection. It was composed by band members Sylvain Vanholme and Raymond Vincent, with David MacKay who also produced the single. The song is in the symphonic pop/rock genre, and uses strings and flutes. Its melody is borrowed from the Act II finale of Pyotr Tchaikovsky's Swan Lake. The song was a hit in mainland Europe, though its popularity did not extend to English-speaking countries, despite its use of English lyrics. The song was covered several times, most notably by the Günter Kallmann Choir in 1970.

== Original recording ==
The song was first recorded in Abbey Road Studios, London, by the band Wallace Collection, and released as the final track on their debut album Laughing Cavalier. The singer was the band's drummer, Freddy Nieuland. It was released as a single in over 20 countries, and reached the top of the Belgium pop chart, and number 3 on the French chart.

== Cover versions ==
The French pop star Claude François, known for writing the original "My Way", released his cover "Rêveries" in April 1969.

The song was covered in 1970 by the German vocal group, the Günter Kallmann Choir, and this version was used on a popular easy listening record of the time. As such Kallmann is occasionally mis-credited as the original author of the song.

In 2001, English electronic group I Monster had a UK chart hit with "Daydream in Blue", a remix of the Günter Kallmann Choir's version of the song; the track peaked at #20 in the UK Singles Chart. The song has also been covered live by the Beta Band as part of their song "Squares". Günter Kallmann Choir's version was sampled in 2006 by American rapper Lupe Fiasco in "Daydreamin'", featuring soul singer Jill Scott. Fiasco's cover won the Grammy Award for Best Urban/Alternative Performance.

== Charts ==
=== Weekly charts ===
Charts (1969)	Peak position
Belgium (Ultratop 50 Flanders)	1
Netherlands (Dutch Top 40)	14
Netherlands (Single Top 100)	13
France (IFOP)	3

=== Year-end charts ===
Charts (1969)	Peak position
France (IFOP)	21

== Samples ==
"Daydream" has been sampled on the following songs:

- "Gangsta Rap" by Hamburg rap group Fettes Brot, on their 1995 album Auf Einem Auge Blöd.
- A remix of "She Said" by The Pharcyde released on Go! Discs Records in 1996. The remix was produced by Fuzz Face (i.e. Geoff Barrow) and tWANK Boy.
- Cut Killer's mixtape, Cut Killer Show Présente: Operation Freestyle of 1998.
- "On a Beautiful Day", by British electronica/alternative rock band Skinny, from their 2001 album Taller (samples the Gunter Kallman Choir version).
- The Beta Band sampled the song for their 2001 song "Squares" (samples the Gunter Kallman Choir version).
- "Daydream in Blue" by I Monster in their 2003 album Neveroddoreven (samples the Gunter Kallman Choir version). This version was used as the basis for "Daydreamin'" by Lupe Fiasco featuring Jill Scott, on his 2006 debut album Lupe Fiasco's Food and Liquor.
- "Hood Dreamin" by Guru (with a sped-up version of the song), from his 2005 solo album Version 7.0: The Street Scriptures.
- "The Highest Commitment" by Qwel and Maker, in some live versions (samples the Gunter Kallmann Choir version)
- "Put Me On (featuring Everlast and Moka Only)" by Swollen Members features a piano background with chords similar in sound to the vocals of the original "Daydream" track.
- "Magenta Rising" by Parov Stelar on his 2015 album The Demon Diaries.
- "Daydream" by Paul Basic on his 2011 album The Mirror.
- The bassline and a similar arrangement were used by Isaac Hayes on "Ike's Rap II", which has in turn been sampled by Portishead, Tricky and Alessia Cara.

== Soundtrack appearances ==
In Norway, this song (the version of Franck Pourcel) has become widely known through its use as background music in a series of televised information snippets regarding mountain safety, produced by Hermann Gran at NRK and the Norwegian Red Cross and broadcast annually through the Norwegian Broadcasting Corporation, (NRK) chiefly around the Easter holidays. The original series was broadcast from 1969, but the theme tune was not introduced until 1972. Due to its association with the Severin Suveren safety snippets, the theme itself quintessentially represents Easter for many Norwegians.

The Belgian film Mr. Nobody in 2009 also used this song several times in the movie.

In 2016, "Daydream in Blue", a remix of the song by I Monster, was featured in the second season of the US television show Mr. Robot starring Rami Malek and Christian Slater.

The song was also used in Noah Hawley's Legion, season three, episode four, released in 2019.

Psychological thriller series Severance (2022) used the I Monster version in trailers and during the closing credits of season 1 episode 2.

The 2005 BBC television series How to be a Gardener written and presented by Alan Titchmarsh used "Daydream in Blue" as part of its extensive soundtrack.

The Gunter Kallmann Choir version is heard during the closing credits of "DTF St. Louis" (2026), Season 1, Episode 6.
