= Benito di Paula =

Brazilian singer-songwriter (1941–2026)

- Di Paula in 2015

Background information
- Born: Uday Vellozo; November 28, 1941; Nova Friburgo, Rio de Janeiro, Brazil
- Died: October 18, 2026 (aged 84) São Paulo, Brazil
- Genre: Samba
- Instruments: Vocal, piano
- Years active: 1956–2026
- Labels: Copacabana Records; WEA; Warner Records; RGE; RCA Records; EMI
- Website: benitodipaula.com.br

Uday Vellozo (November 28, 1941 – October 18, 2026), better known by the stage name of Benito di Paula, was a Brazilian singer-songwriter, composer, pianist and writer. He was known for his characteristic samba that started when he was young and sang in hotels and nightclubs in Rio de Janeiro, where he did not play a specific genre. Di Paula was invited by a friend to play in Santos, where he led his career in the State of São Paulo.

Di Paula settled down and raised a family in São Paulo, where he developed his career, becoming the great symbol of Samba Paulista. Between the 1970s and 1980s he achieved great fame, having sold 50 million records, being the 5th largest record seller in Brazil. In addition to Brazil, Di Paula sold records in other countries, recorded in languages such as Spanish, French, Italian, Finnish, German and others, with a total of 4 million records sold in Europe. He has more than 35 recorded LPs, with an important part of his work being re-released on CD, due to his great success.

== Life and career ==
=== Childhood ===
Born in Nova Friburgo on November 28, 1941, Uday Vellozo was the son of José Vellozo, a railway worker at Leopoldina Station, and Maria, who also had 12 other children. It was a family of humble origins. His father descended from gypsies and knew how to play several string instruments in an amateur way. He had a Carnival block, with the name "Good people doesn't mix with us", and a Regional group. Watching him play, Uday also learned some instruments.

=== Beginning as a singer ===
Uday Vellozo achieved national fame as Benito di Paula, a name chosen by him and Alfredo Motta, a great promoter of his career who invited him when he was between 15 and 16 years old to sing at the Avenida Hotel, located on Dante Laginestra Street, in downtown from Nova Friburgo. Initially, they chose the artistic name "Benito" for Uday, to which they later added "di Paula", with the aim of "Italianizing" the singer's name. At the age of 17, he went to serve in the Army in Rio de Janeiro. He lived in Morro da Formiga (Ant Hill), in the Tijuca, North Zone of the city, where he was a crooner at nightclubs, mainly at the Balalaika nightclub, in Copacabana, however he earned not much money. One day, a couple of friends invited him to earn twice as much in São Paulo. Benito continued to play the piano in nightclubs Santos and in the city of São Paulo, as well as at Samba Cathedral, in the Bixiga neighborhood, where he often performed.

=== Career start and rise ===
In 1956, still young, he began his recording life with Portinho & sua Orquestra, with his own single "Final". And from this year until the middle of the next decade, he made compositions and appearances while playing in nightclubs in Rio de Janeiro.

In 1966 he released two of his songs on a disc by the label Continental, which included the first song from 1956 on one side, and "Bem Feito", on the other, the first being accompanied by Portinho & sua Orquestra and the second by Os Brasas. In 1968 another disc was recorded, in this one, there was, in addition to his song, "Canção para o Nosso Amor", a recording of "Andança", a song by Beth Carvalho. In the first copies of this disc, there was still his born name, Uday Vellozo, on the cover, but soon after he changed to his artistic name by which he became known, Benito di Paula . With that, shortly after, he delivered three new songs for an album together with other artists, whose name was Para Você; the songs were "Mocidade é Alegria", "Mestre" and "Natal no Brasil"; in addition to also recording a composition by J.M. Ferreira and Mariza Saboya, "Espera". The song "Canção para o Nosso Amor" earned Benito, the main soundtrack of the telenovela Nino, o Italianinho by TV Tupi from 1969, in addition to the album itself. Even at that time, his music had a rhythm that resembled rock and soul, Roberto Carlos style, and melancholy romantics. In the same year, he delivered compositions and lyrics to other artists, such as Ronnie Von, on his album "A Misteriosa Luta Do Reino De Parassempre Contra O Império De Nunca Mais", the song "Foi Bom".

In 1970, he released the single "Hei John/Faça de Mim Uma Ilha", which competed in and won the Chico Viola Prize of the same year, given by TV Record, and as a result, in 1971 the recording company Copacabana invited him to record an LP record as a crooner, whose LP name was "Benito di Paula", which included "Jesus Cristo" (Roberto and Erasmo Carlos), "Azul da cor do mar" (Tim Maia) and "Apesar de Você", by Chico Buarque. For that last song, he was censored from being played on the radio and had his records recalled from stores. On this same album, he also performed four compositions of his own, including "Violão Não Se Empresta a Ninguém", which was the song that ended up selling the LP. This, being in 1972 the 66th most played song on the radio.

After Di Paula's performance on the Chacrinha show on TV Tupi, Chico Buarque, during the recordings for the soundtrack LP of Carlos Diegues' When Carnival Comes, left his house for the studio whistling the melody. A single hearing of the song was sufficient for Buarque to recall the lyrics and melody. During his trip to the studio, Buarque created variations on Benito di Paula's original lyrics in his own style. Buarque used the musicians present at the session that day to record his version of the song. The recording was omitted from the final version of the album, and Buarque did not present it to the composer.

His second LP "Ela", from 1972, took some of his tracks to other places, such as the United States. But in 1973 he burst onto the charts with the third "Um Novo Samba", in whose cover he already appeared with his mustache and goatee, long hair, in addition to chains, earrings, bracelets etc.. The great success of this album was the song "Retalhos de Cetim", which became the 2nd most played in all media of the year, being its biggest success until then. In this "Um Novo Samba", Benito created his own style of playing samba, but this generated a lot of controversy among some of the critics at the time, who began to call what he did "samba-joia", by combining traditional samba with piano and arrangements romantic and jazzistic. However, this Samba-joia did not please Benito, who never stopped mentioning it as a pejorative term, since it identifies itself as being of the Samba genre. Being impelled by "Retalhos de Cetim", Benito became one of the great names of the Brazilian Popular Music of the 70s. This same composition opened the doors to success in Brazil and abroad, having been recorded by Jair Rodrigues, by the orchestra of Paul Mauriat and by the guitarist American Charlie Byrd, also appearing among the compositions selected by the historian Jairo Severiano as one of the greatest hits of the year 1973. The simple disc had sold more than 150 thousand copies.

=== 1970s and heyday ===
In 1974 he released another LP, entitled Gravado Ao Vivo, which contained more songs that became the most played of the year, including "Beleza Que Você é Mulher", "Apesar de Tudo" and his other great song that is almost always associated with his name, "Charlie Brown". This song took 5 years to compose, starting in 1969, the year Benito was living in an Italian inn in Santos; where the other residents read Charlie Brown comics. When Benito asked about what was going on in the comics, he was enchanted with the character and then wrote the song that became one of the most played in 1974. In the same year, Roberto Carlos releases his fourteenth studio album on the label CBS, containing as track number two the song "Quero Ver Você de Perto", being a song by Benito that had not been released on any record until then. Di Paula also recorded the song "Último Andar" for the national soundtrack of the drama O Espigão (Rede Globo), aired between April and November of the same year.

In 1975 he released two LPs. One of these was a career album, and had more hits that were played at the time, among them being "Vai Ficar na Saudade", "Não Precisa Me Perdoar" and "Bandeira Do Samba", all going to the most played of the year. On this same album there was a song in tribute to Ataulfo Alves, "Como Dizia O Mestre", a great inspiration for Benito and also another tribute, which was "Sanfona Branca", made for Luiz Gonzaga. Benito was a friend of Luiz Gonzaga, ever since they first met in the bathroom at an Artists' Caravan in Brasília planned by Silvio Santos. Luiz Gonzaga also wrote a song for Benito, "Chapéu de Couro e Gratidão", from his album "Chá Cutuba". Gonzaga called him "my step son".

In the same year, he hosted the TV program Brasil Som 75, on TV Tupi, from São Paulo, which resulted in an album released in the same year, in which he presented some of his guests, including Elizeth Cardoso, Wando and Bebeto. On this album, he released another hit at the time, "Mulher Brasileira", a song that is also usually associated with him. One of the times he left the show's recording studio, he found Adoniran Barbosa, who gave him a piece of paper with half a song done and asked Benito to continue. Benito continued the song and later, together with Adoniran, they delivered it to the group Os Três Moraes, with the title "Não Precisa Muita Coisa". In the same year, alongside Elizeth Cardoso, Paulinho da Viola, Gilberto Gil, Jorge Ben Jor, Beth Carvalho, Sônia Santos, Quinteto Violado and Cláudia, was part of the Brazilian delegation that participated in the Midem Festival (Marché International du Disque et de l'Édition Musicale), in the city of Cannes, in France. Still in 1975, he released the song "Charlie Brown" abroad, which was very successful, to the point that Chico Buarque referred to Charlie Brown as if he were a real character. The song was covered by artists like Two Man Sound and Sylvia Vrethammar.

In 1976 he still continued and released an album with the name Brasil Som 76, but was soon replaced by Elizeth Cardoso, this album not being widely distributed. However, he released a career album, which featured three songs that once again became radio hits, and they were "Tudo Está No Seu Lugar", a song made for his mother and family, "Do Jeito Que A Vida Quer", another tribute to Ataulfo Alves, and "Maria Baiana Maria", which yielded a single single just for this song. With all these songs gaining fame with each album released, Benito is nominated for the Press Trophy of best singer of the same year, competing against Roberto Carlos and Chico Buarque, and ends up winning the award. He also makes his first appearance at the Golden Globe from Rede Globo, with the song "Vai Ficar Na Saudade" , yielding a music video in the same year.

In the year 1977 he released a song on his album Benito di Paula entitled "Osso Duro de Roer", where he made a clear statement that he was still alive, because the same journalists that called him "tacky", "cheesy" and "out of style" had also said that Benito had leukemia and that he had even died. These critics created the pejorative label "samba-joia" for the type of music that Benito did, they always existed as said before, but at each moment they became more frequent as time went by as he became more famous, but he never stopped defending himself, calling them "owners of samba" . On the same album there was the song "De Tombar Caminhão" and "Proteção as Borboletas", which also went on to be among the most played songs of the year. In addition to having also made "Assobiar ou Chupar Cana", a song that was made for actors, sportsmen and others who gained notoriety on TV, who ventured as musical interpreters and claiming to be singers and composers. And, in a way, people who used their public image to give their opinion on various topics. Benito uses Pelé as his main target, as they already had a certain verbal hostility, portrayed in the song "Coisas da Vida" from 1975.

In 1978 he released his LP with songs that, in a long time, were not among the most played songs of the year. this was because as time went by, they started to become more melancholic, just like at the beginning of their career in the 60s. But despite that, there were still lively songs like "Ave de Rapina"" and "Viva O Sol", which became the opening theme of his tv program that he had two years later.

By 1979, the album that many listeners call Desencontro, for being the first track, is released. This album has romantic songs, and with a very melancholy rhythm, as can be seen in the names, "Se Eu Pudesse", "Madrugada", "Olha Nós Aí" and the song "Pau-de-Arara", which has an almost imperceptible criticism of the government and the situation of the Sertão. But even so, he still has lively songs like "Vamos Cantar" and "Som do Meu Cavaquinho". In the same year he recorded with the group Demônios da Garoa the soundtrack song "A Vida é Dura", which was the theme of the character Victor Valentim from the telenovela Ti-ti-ti from Rede Globo.

=== 1980s ===
The 1980s of Benito di Paula are mainly due to a constant change of labels and a considerable decline of the artist, where he starts to lose place in the media in a constant way. It is also a time where his music, in the early parts of the decade, is much calmer than in the previous decade. But even so, it was a time of many songs that pleased his loyal audience, who continue to remember a lot of that time, his fame always being related to the 1970s. In 1980 he released an album that didn't quite follow the rhythm of the previous ones, but something different, like a "lively music with sad lyrics". On this record there were songs like "Quero Ver Você de Perto", (now with him singing instead of Roberto) "De Quem É Essa Morena" (his song together with Chico Anysio), "Havia Festa" and "Nossa Homenagem", made as a tribute to Vinicius de Moraes, who had died in July of the same year. Still in 1980, he was invited by Sílvio Santos to start recording another program where he would be a presenter, now on TVS. The program was interviews with singers, who would be interviewed at the same time as they sang, the name of the program was "O Som do Brasil", and had as its theme song "Viva o Sol" from 1978. Due to alleged budget problems, the program did not go much further, and was later placed as a "Benito di Paula Special". That same year, suddenly, the label Copacabana canceled all contracts with Benito, after the release of the album.

In 1981 without Copacabana, Benito makes a contract with WEA to release his new album. On this album, he managed to return to the most played media, with his song "Ah, Como Eu Amei". In addition to this great fame, there were other songs that greatly pleased his audience, such as "Um Dia Vai Chegar" and "Preciso Te Encontrar".

In 1982 he released another album by WEA, and on this album, he yielded another successful song, despite not being as great as the previous one, which was "Sonho em Preto e Branco". The other songs on the LP were mostly known to the singer's fans, such as "Radamés" and "Chorei". His song, which was still in the fourth place of the most played songs of the year, "Ah, Como Eu Amei", goes to the national soundtrack of the telenovela O Homem Proibido, from Rede Globo.

In 1983 he released his last album for WEA, with the name Bom Mesmo é o Brasil, because, like Copacabana, canceled the contracts with the singer. In this album, the rhythm, genre and music itself is totally different from all of their previous albums, as it follows a funk mostly. This sudden change did not please many of its listeners, so much so that it is one of the least purchased, being difficult to find nowadays. But even so, there were songs in the old style, like "Vovó Clementina" and "O Xerife e o Bandido". That same year saw the peak of the Clube de Amigos do Benito di Paula do Litoral Santista, one of, if not the biggest, club of fans listening to Benito throughout Brazil. In this year, its leardership was: president Rose di Paula, vice president Luiz Caymmi and director Maruda Bitra.

On the album he released in 1984, Que Brote Enfim o Rouxinol Que Existe Em Mim, he signed a contract with RGE. On this LP, a song stood out, "Amigo do Sol, Amigo da Lua", a song with "innocent and pure content", which gained quite a bit of fame and later ended up as the soundtrack of telenovela on Rede Globo, A gata comeu. In addition to this song, there were others like "Sigo Te Amando", "Fonte Nova" and "Lagartixa Também Muda de Cor", which is believed to be a kind of indirect due to its letter.

In 1985, he released his album with the name Nação, an album where he made many criticisms and defended some guidelines. For example, in its first track, which has the name homonym of the album, it criticizes the exterminations, lack of rights and land of Indigenous peoples in Brazil. He also made a song to mark the redemocratization of Brazil after the military dictatorship, the name of the song is given by "New Republic". The album featured the special participation of the duo Tonico & Tinoco, in the song "Caminhante", and also featured the Grande Otelo, in the song "Samba de Um Não Dá".

In the year of 1986 he released an instrumental album, where there were classics such as "Retalhos de Cetim", "Ela", "Madrugada", "Sonho em Preto e Branco", "Tudo está Mudado" and even his last famous one, "Amigo do Sol, Amigo da Lua". After releasing the album, RGE no longer had a contract with him. He also records with Luiz Gonzaga the song "Viva Meu Padim", on the album Forró de cabo a Rabo, by the northeastern singer.

In 1987 he released an album by Copacabana once again, its name was Quando a Festa Acabar, but the album was unsuccessful, being hard to find these days. On the LP there were songs like "Quando a Festa Acabar" and "Vale o Que Está Escrito". This album marked the end of an era, as he spent three years without recording anything after its release, and this had never happened before, going even a year without releasing an album since his career began. Despite this, he made many presentations, and sang the main song of the album in the last program of Chacrinha, on July 2, 1988, due to the death of the presenter on June 30.

=== 1990s ===
The 1990s were his last years of national exposure during a long period ahead, it was a decade where he released an album every two years. In 1990 he released the album Fazendo Paixão on label RCA Victor, where we had his last song that burst on the radio, which had the name homonym, music that was a production of Chico Roque and Carlos Colla, and not Benito as usual. The song had a video clip that was recorded in Paquetá Island, Rio de Janeiro. In addition to this song, they also had others such as "A Vida é Bonita Sem Você", "Cigarra Marrom" (made for Alcione) and "Pedaços de Carinho". On April 30, 2021, in a livestream on his son's Instagram, he revealed that he did not like the album very much, and said that it was the record company's decision (the lyrics of the songs).

Two years later, in 1992, he released the album A Vida Me Faz Viver, his last for the Copacabana. The album featured songs like "Eu Não Aguento Mais", which seems to be a kind of outburst by the singer, as it was shown at the time. The album had its biggest exhibition in the program of Rede Globo "Almanaque" together with César Filho. At this time his look was different than usual and before the last album. Now his hair was shorter, with a less "messy" shape, mustache and goatee done, etc. Although the album did not have any "pop" song, one of the tracks "Meto o Pé Na Porta", was re-recorded by other artists such as Gian & Giovani.

In 1994 he released the album Pode Acreditar, again and for the last time with RGE. The album was presented on the program Jô Soares Onze e Meia on August 16, 1994, where he sang one of the songs from the album, "O Amor é Um Jogo". The last track on this album was "Senna Nosso Campeão", in tribute of Ayrton Senna, the Brazilian Formula 1 driver who died in an accident caused during one of his races. He also had the special participation of Chico Anysio in the songs "O Amor é Um Jogo" and "Choro de Homem", latter being featured in one of the episodes of Escolinha do Professor Raimundo. The album had a rhythm very similar to their previous ones from the beginning of the 1970s. In the same year, two singles were released, "Por Amor" and "Viva Meu Padim", for Luiz Gonzaga. And then in 1996 he released a new LP and also in CD, Baileiro by Paradoxx Music, which contained songs like "Dignidade de um Otário" and "Sentimentos de Amor". Benito would not release another LP or CD in the next 13 years, for the reason that no record company asked him to record.

In the second half of 1997, he started as a writer by publishing the book of short stories Cantos e Contos do Benito di Paula. In 1998 he participated in the "Projeto Seis e Meia", at Teatro João Caetano, in Rio de Janeiro. On the occasion, he performed with the pianist Carolina Cardoso de Menezes, this being the last show of the great pianist. Around that time, Paulinho Moska re-recorded with great success "Retalhos de Cetin".

=== 2000s ===
In the first decade of the new millennium, Benito di Paula disappears from all media and rarely appears in an interview or music program. In the year 2002 the group from Pagode Revelação re-recorded with great success "Do Jeito Que A Vida Quer". That same year, the book Velhas Histórias, memórias futuras by Eduardo Granja Coutinho was released, a book in which the author made several references to the composer. That same year, he cut his hair to just above his shoulder, in addition to leaving it "messy" again. He also started shaving his mustache and goatee.

In 2003, "Do Jeito Que A Vida Quer" (with Grupo Revelação) was one of the most played songs on segmented stations in samba in Rio de Janeiro and throughout Brazil. In the same year, Alcione, on the album Alcione ao vivo 2, re-recorded "Retalhos de Cetim", one of the composer's greatest hits. That year, on the CNT program Calouros em Delirios, with Pedro de Lara, Benito completely removed his mustache and goatee, leaving his hair short to the nape of the neck, which caused strangeness among the public.

In 2004 he performed in a show at Lona Cultural João Bosco, in Rio de Janeiro. And in 2008 the group Samba de Rainha, composed only of women, re-recorded "Retalho de Cetin" on the CD " Vivendo samba.

After 13 years without recording, Benito released in 2009 on EMI Music his second live CD and first DVD recorded at Vivo Rio, one of the biggest venues in Rio of Janeiro. On that occasion, he recorded the greatest hits of his career and four new compositions, including "Quero ser sua amigo" (previously recorded in 1975 by Agnaldo Timóteo), "Pagode da cigana", "Ficar, Ficamos" and "Unidos de Tom Jobim", a tribute to the maestro. Among the hits presented are "Retalho de Cetin", "Mulher Brasileira", "Tudo Está No Seu Lugar", "Beleza Que é Você Mulher" and "Charlie Brown", in addition to "Ah, Como Eu Amei" (by his brothers Ney and Jota Vellozo) and "Me Dê Motivo" (Michael Sullivan and Paulo Massadas), accompanied by the band composed by Jorge Cardoso (musical direction), Ney Vellozo (guitar), nephew Kauan Vellozo (ukulele), Téo Lima (drums), Edu (bass), Luiz Felipe (Seven-string guitar), Ivanildo, Pirulito and Esguleba (percussion), Jussara, Jurema, Jefferson and Nélio (backing vocals) and his son Rodrigo Vellozo on piano. The DVD also included "Bandeira do samba", "Do Jeito Que a Vida Quer", "Como Dizia o Mestre", "Assobiar e Chupar Cana", "Se Não For Amor", "Osso Duro de Roer", "Maria baiana Maria", "Sanfona Branca" and "Violão Não Se Empresta a Ninguém".

=== 2010s ===
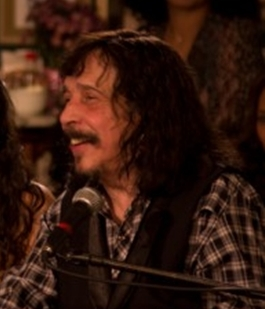
Di Paula on TV Brasil in 2012

In 2011 next to Arnaldo Antunes, Alcione, Leci Brandão, Beth Carvalho, Tania Maria, Zeca Baleiro, Verônica Ferriani, Cida Moreira, Fabiana Cozza, Diogo Nogueira and Milena participated in the tribute CD to Nelson Cavaquinho entitled Uma flor para Nelson Cavaquinho, released by the label Lua Music, in which he performed the track "Rugas", by Nelson Cavaquinho, Augusto Garcez and Ari Monteiro.

In 2012 he made a special appearance in a concert by Grupo Revelação at Arena HSBC in Rio de Janeiro. They sang three of the singer's greatest hits, namely "Além de Tudo", "Retalhos de Cetim" and "Charlie Brown".

In 2013, Fernando Haddad became mayor of São Paulo and sent a subpoena that he would expropriate and demolish Benito's mansion in Morumbi, where he had lived for over 30 years, for the construction of a metro line, a project that began with the then mayor Gilberto Kassab. The City Hall said it would compensate with R$500,000 (US$90,000), which was not worth the total amount of the house according to Benito, who at the time would have paid "billions of Cruzeiros" (US$1,000,000). Benito tried to negotiate while he went after another house. He commented a lot on this on the program A Tarde é Sua with Sonia Abrão, saying that when the subpoena arrived, he even thought about suicide. The house was expropriated and he got a compensation of R$1,000,000 (US$200,000), and with that bought an apartment in Jardins, where he moved in with his son Rodrigo. Also had his hit song "Mulher Brasileira" re-recorded by his son Rodrigo Vellozo for the telenovela Dona Xepa, on RecordTV.

At the end of 2019, his son, André Vellozo, 36 years old, committed suicide.

=== 2020s ===
After the mourning, in 2020, together with his son Rodrigo, who would release his album, they made a song in tribute to André, entitled "Lagrimas no Meu Sorriso".

Shortly after the start of the COVID-19 pandemic, as a precaution, Benito shaved his head and beard. He also started to make, with the help of his son Rodrigo, " livestreams " where he sings his greatest hits together with his son.

On August 3, 2021, Aurora was born, daughter of Rodrigo and his wife Carolina Bellezi, being Benito's first granddaughter. And on November 12 of the same year, he released a single with his son Rodrigo, entitled "O Infalível Zen", and on the 28th of the same month a full album of the same name.

=== Death ===
Benito di Paula died of prostate cancer in São Paulo, on October 18, 2026, at the age of 84.

== Discography ==
- 1956 – Final (Continental)
- 1966 – Final/Bem Feito (Continental)
- 1967 – Uday Vellozo (Continental)
- 1968 – Benito di Paula (Continental)
- 1969 – Nino, o Italianinho (Copacabana)
- 1970 – Hei John / Faça de Mim Uma Ilha (Copacabana)
- 1971 – Benito di Paula (Copacabana)
- 1972 – Ela (Copacabana)
- 1972 – Violão Não Se Empresa À Ninguém (Copacabana)
- 1973 – Um Novo Samba (Copacabana)
- 1974 – Gravado ao Vivo (Copacabana)
- 1975 – Benito di Paula e Seus Convidados – Brasil Som 75 (Copacabana)
- 1975 – Benito di Paula / Você Vai Ficar Na Saudade (Copacabana)
- 1976 – Benito di Paula / Tudo Está No Seu Lugar (Copacabana)
- 1977 – Benito di Paula / Assobiar ou Chupar Cana (Copacabana)
- 1978 – Benito di Paula / Viva O Sol (Copacabana)
- 1978 – Caprichos de La Vida Copacabana)
- 1979 – Benito di Paula / Desencontro (Copacabana)
- 1980 – Benito di Paula / Havia Festa (Copacabana)
- 1981 – Benito di Paula / Ah, Como Eu Amei (WEA)
- 1982 – Benito di Paula / Sonho em Preto e Branco (WEA)
- 1983 – Bom Mesmo É o Brasil (WEA)
- 1984 – Que Brote Enfim o Rouxinol que Existe em Mim (RGE)
- 1985 – Nação (RGE)
- 1986 – Benito di Paula / Instrumental
- 1987 – Quando a Festa Acabar (Copacabana)
- 1990 – Fazendo Paixão (BMG Ariola)
- 1992 – A Vida Me Faz Viver (Copacabana)
- 1994 – Pode Acreditar (RGE)
- 1996 – Balieiro (Paradoxx Music)
- 2009 – Ao Vivo (CD & DVD, EMI Music)
- 2016 – Essa Felicidade É Nossa (RYB8 Music)
- 2021 – O Infalível Zen (Rodrigo & Benito)
