= Samba-joia =

Samba-joia (lit. 'samba-jewel'; also sambão-joia or simply sambão) is an old pejorative term coined by Brazilian music critics to designate a more romantic type of samba born in the 1970s.

This is a format with a simpler rhythmic structure that dilutes the percussion, the main attribute of traditional samba. Described as an old-fashioned brega by critics, it was nevertheless a great commercial success for romantic artists such as Agepê, Benito di Paula, Gilson de Souza, Luiz Américo and Luiz Ayrão.

Certain critics point out that the movement influenced certain groups in the pagode romântico subgenre of the 1990s.

== Bibliography ==
- Lopes, Nei; Simas, Luiz Antonio (2015). Dicionário da História Social do Samba (in Brazilian Portuguese). Rio de Janeiro: Civilização Brasileira. p. 271. ISBN 978-8520012581.
- Lima, Natasha Correa (2017-08-03). "Ídolo do 'sambão-joia', Agepê foi o primeiro a vender 1 milhão de discos" (in Brazilian Portuguese). Rio de Janeiro: O Globo.
- Vianna, Luiz Fernando; Martini, Paula (2016-12-04). "Samba-joia era romântico e se aproximava do bolero" (in Brazilian Portuguese). Rio de Janeiro: CBN.
- Cruz, Maria Alice (2011-11-27). "O 'sambão-joia' pede passagem" (PDF) (in Brazilian Portuguese). Campinas: Jornal da Unicamp. p. 12.
- Lauretti, Patrícia (May 2014). "O samba mediado". Jornal da Unicamp. 597. Campinas.
