= Ultratop =

Belgian cultural organisation

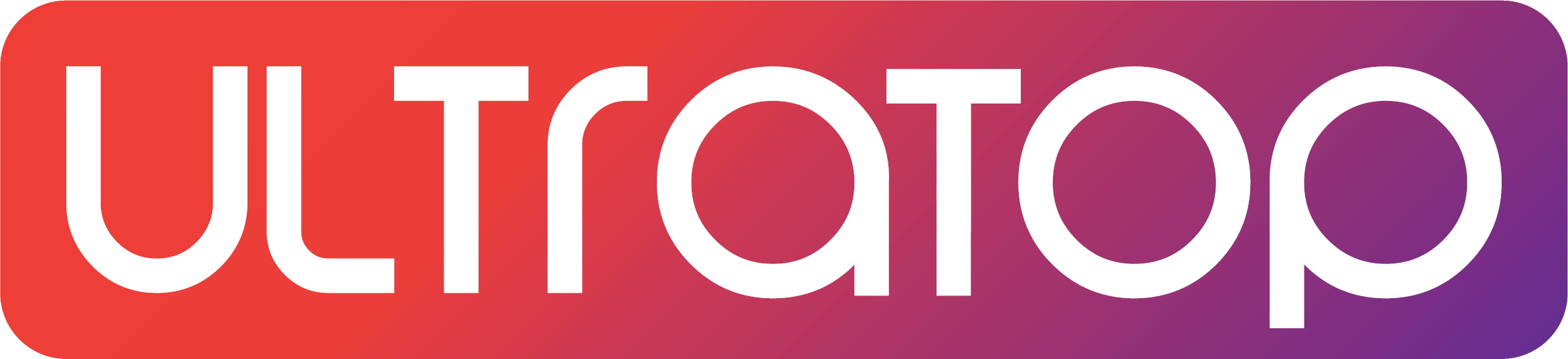
- Formation: 1995; 31 years ago
- Type: Nonprofit
- Purpose: Record charts
- Location: Belgium
- Official language: Dutch, French
- Website: ultratop.be/nl/

Ultratop is an organization which generates and publishes the official record charts in Belgium. Ultratop is a non-profit organization, created in 1995 on the initiative of the Belgian Entertainment Association (BEA), the Belgian member organization of the International Federation of the Phonographic Industry. Two parallel sets of charts are concurrently produced and published: one is on behalf of Belgium's mainly Dutch-speaking Flanders region, and the other caters to the nation's mainly French-speaking region of Wallonia.

== Ultratop charts ==
The music charts produced by Ultratop organization are separated along regional-language boundaries, an unusual division that is justified by the cultural differences in Belgium. So it is that the mainly Dutch-speaking Flanders region has one set of charts of record activity there, while the mainly French-speaking Wallonia region has another set to measure popularity in those provinces.

The charts are broadcast on several Belgian radio stations, and on TV stations TMF in Flanders and Plug RTL in Wallonia.

=== Procedure ===
Ultratop creates charts based on record sales of around 500 retail outlets and legal digital downloads. Currently GfK is the market observer of the charts. The chart broadcasts on Radio Contact on Saturdays from 12:00 to 14:00. The combined number of Ultratop chart listeners on the various radio or TV stations exceeds two million every week. To celebrate the 10th anniversary of the charts in 2005, a jubilee book was published. It covers all 15,282 singles from 5,882 artists thus far.

=== Prominent charts ===
==== Ultratop 50 Singles (Flemish chart) ====
Ultratop 50 has existed since 31 March 1995. Prior to 1995, the official IFPI Belgium charts which covered both the French speaking part of Belgium (Wallonia) and the Dutch speaking part of Belgium (Flanders) were compiled based on shipments from distributors to retailers and not on sales from retailers to customers. However, this chart coexisted with a weekly Flemish chart that was based on actual sales from retailers to customers known as the Radio 2 Top 30 (previously known as the BRT Top 30) and which was broadcast by VRT, also known as BRT. After Ultratop started publishing the official charts in 1995, Radio 2 started publishing and broadcasting the Ultratop charts. The Ultratop 50 chart is compiled in Dutch and presented on the Belgian radio station MNM. It also used to air on the now defunct TMF Flanders, and has not been shown on television since.

The charts archived on the Ultratop website from before when Ultratop started (1995) are retroactively taken from the book Het Belgisch hitboek: 45 jaar hits in Vlaanderen: 1954-1999 by Robert Collin which in turn uses a variety of sources.

==== Ultratop 50 Singles (Walloon chart) ====
The Walloon Ultratop chart began in 1995 as the Ultratop 40, ranking the forty best-selling singles in the mainly French-speaking region of Belgium. The predecessor prior to Ultratop was a nationwide (unified) Belgian chart which began to be compiled in 1961. On 4 September 2010, the Ultratop 40 was renamed Ultratop 50 as well, after the ranking list increased from a total of 40 to 50 songs.

==== Ultratop 200 Albums (Flemish chart) ====
Compiled in Dutch, it covers weekly albums sales in Belgium's Dutch-speaking Flanders region. Originally brought out as the Ultratop 50 Albums chart, it was expanded to become the Ultratop 100 Albums chart, and eventually the Ultratop 200 Albums chart.

==== Ultratop 200 Albums (Walloon chart) ====
Published in French, it covers weekly albums sales in Belgium's French-speaking Wallonia region.

=== Complete list of Ultratop charts ===
The Ultratop charts published include:

List of all Ultratop charts
Chart name	Flanders	Wallonia
Ultratop 50 Singles	Top 50	Top 50
Ultratop 200 Albums	Top 200	Top 200
Ultratop Compilations	Top 20	Top 20
Ultratop Dance	Top 50	Top 50
Ultratop R&B/Hip-Hop	Top 50	Top 50
Ultratop Airplay	Top 30	Top 30
Ultratop Alternative Albums	Top 50	—N/a
Back Catalogue Singles	Top 50	Top 50
Dance Bubbling Under	Top 20	Top 20
Albums Belges / Belgische Albums	Top 40	Top 20
Mid Price	Top 20	Top 20
Heatseekers Albums	Top 20	Top 20
Albums Classiques / Klassiek Albums	Top 20	Top 20
DVD Musicaux / Muziek-DVD	Top 40	Top 10
Ultratop Vlaams	Top 10	—N/a
Radio 2 Vlaams	Top 10	—N/a
Vlaams Kids	Top 5	—N/a

== Ultratip ==
In addition to the main Ultratop 50, another weekly singles chart known as Ultratip or Ultratip Bubbling Under was published until it was discontinued on 29 May 2021. Also referred to as the Tipparade, it was an indicator chart of songs that had not or had not yet reached the Ultratop 50, comparable to the US Bubbling Under Hot 100 chart.

=== Ultratip charts ===
- Flanders: Ultratip Bubbling Under 100
- Wallonia: Ultratip Bubbling Under 50

== Streaming ==
Since 2016 for singles, and since July 2017 for albums, the Ultratop charts also include streaming. The exact number of streams that are counted as a single or an album is undisclosed. In order to avoid inflation of album sales through raising the number of tracks, only the twelve most streamed tracks are counted. To avoid the effect of one-hit wonders, the two most streamed tracks are counted at the average of the next ten tracks.

== See also ==
- List of number-one hits (Belgium)
- List of best-selling Belgian music artists
- Music of Belgium
