= Agepê =

Brazilian singer and composer (1942–1995)

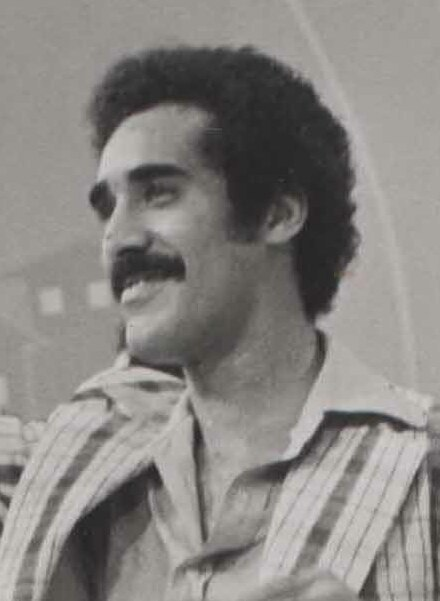

Background information
- Also known as: Ripinha
- Born: Antônio Gilson Porfírio; August 10, 1942; Rio de Janeiro, Brazil
- Died: August 30, 1995 (aged 53) Rio de Janeiro, Brazil
- Genres: Samba
- Occupation: Singer AND composer
- Instrument: vocals
- Years active: 1975–1995

Antônio Gilson Porfírio (August 10, 1942 – August 30, 1995), better known as Agepê, was a Brazilian singer and composer. His nickname consists of the initials AGP, of his name.

His discography is characterized by a romantic and sensual style that some have called commercial. Its main success is the song "Deixa eu te amar" (Let me love you), illustrating the telenovela of the TV Globo Vereda Tropical. His hit album Mistura Brasileira has sold more than a million and a half copies.

== Biography ==
Born in 1942 in Rio de Janeiro, Agepê worked as a baggage carrier. His first nickname was Ripinha. He worked also as a technical designer for the company Telecomunicações do Rio de Janeiro, which he then abandoned to pursue his artistic career.

His recording career began in 1975 when he published Moro onde não mora ninguém (I live where no one lives), which was then remixed by Wando. Nine years later, he wrote and sang "Deixa eu te amar", which was also the soundtrack of the telenovela Vereda Tropical.

He was part of a group of composers of the samba school Portela. He has also successfully remixed Cama e Mesa by Roberto Carlos and Erasmo Carlos.

On August 27, 1995, he was admitted to the São Bernardo Clinic for an ulcer worsened by diabetes. The next day he went into a coma. He died on August 30 and was buried in the São Francisco Xavier cemetery in Caju, a neighborhood in Rio de Janeiro.

== Discography ==
- Moro Onde Não Mora Ninguém (1975)
- Agepê (1977)
- Canto De Esperança (1978)
- Tipo Exportação (1978)
- Agepê (1979)
- Agepê (1981)
- Mistura Brasileira (1984) – 1,500,000 copies sold
- Agepê (1985)
- Agepê (1986)
- Agepê (1987)
- Canto Pra Gente Cantar (1988)
- Cultura Popular (1989)
- Agepê (1990)
- Me Leva (1992)
- Feliz Da Vida (1994)
- Maxximum (Sony BMG, 2005)

== See also ==
- Liga Independente das Escolas de Samba do Rio de Janeiro
