= List of best-selling Belgian music artists =

The best-selling Belgian music artists cannot be listed officially, as there is no organization that has recorded global music sales of Belgian artists. This page lists those artists who have had claims made to be among the top sellers.

== Belgian artists by reputed sales 1940–present ==
=== 50 million records or more ===
No.	Artist	Sales (in millions)	Period	Genre	Source
1	Salvatore Adamo	100 more	1963–present	Chanson	

=== 20 million records or more ===
No.	Artist	Sales (in millions)	Period	Genre	Source
2	Frédéric François	40	1970–present	Chanson	
3	Lou Deprijck/Plastic Bertrand	38	1963–present	Pop/Rock	
4	Jacques Brel	25	1953-1978†	Chanson	

=== 10 million records or more ===
No.	Artist	Sales (in millions)	Period	Genre	Source
5	Rocco Granata	17	1959–present	Pop	
6	Francis Goya	15	1966–present	Instrumental	
7	Frank Michael	15	1974–present	Pop	
8	Technotronic	14	1988–2005	Eurodance	
9	Helmut Lotti	13.3	1990–present	Pop	
10	Lara Fabian	13	1986–present	Pop	
11	Claude Barzotti	12	1973–2023†	Pop	
12	Vaya Con Dios	10.5	1986–2014	Pop	
13	Art Sullivan	10.4	1966-2019†	Chanson	

=== 5 million records or more ===
No.	Artist	Sales (in millions)	Period	Genre	Source
14	Stromae	8.6	2005–Present	Hip Hop/Dance	
15	André Brasseur	7	1965–present	Instrumental	
16	Lio	7	1979–present	Pop	
17	Tony Sandler	6	1949–present	Pop	
18	Annie Cordy	5.5	1960–2000	Pop	
19	Axelle Red	5.2	1987–present	Pop	
20	Lasgo	5	2000–present	Dance	
21	Bobbejaan Schoepen	5	1938–2010†	Pop	
22	Eddy Wally	5	1959–2016†	Schlager	

=== 2 million records or more ===
No.	Artist	Sales (in millions)	Period	Genre	Source
23	K3	4.6	1999–present	Pop	
24	J.J. Lionel	4.5	1970-2020†	Pop	
25	Ian Van Dahl/Annagrace	4.3	2000–present	Dance	
26	Paradisio	4.1	1994–present	Dance	
27	Les Crazy Horse/Alain Delorme	4	1971–1975	Pop	
28	Confetti's/T-Spoon	4	1982–present	New Beat/Dance	
29	The Wallace Collection	4	1968–present	Pop/rock	
30	Benny B	3.5	1990–present	Eurodance	
31	Soeur Sourire	3.5	1963-1983†	Pop	
32	DJ F.R.A.N.K./Van Rijswijk/Danzel	3.3	1999–present	Dance	
33	Maurane	3.2	1979–2018†	Pop	
34	Clouseau	3.1	1984–present	Pop	
35	Christian Vidal	3.1	1972–present	Pop	
36	Junior Jack	3	1990–present	Eurodance	
37	Kate Ryan	3	2000–present	Pop/Dance/House	
38	K's Choice	3	1990–present	Rock	
39	Lords of Acid/Praga Khan	2.9	1988–present	Acid house	
40	Soulwax/2 many dj's	2.7	1995–Present	Rock/Dance	
41	Django Reinhardt	2.5	1934-1953†	Jazz	
42	Front 242	2.5	1980–present	Electro	
43	Jimmy Frey	(2.5)	1956–present	Pop	
44	Toots Thielemans	2.5	1940–2016†	Jazz/Instrumental	
45	Henri Seroka	2.2	1969–present	Film music/Pop	
46	Milow	2.2	2003–present	Pop	
47	Dana Winner	2.15	1989–present	Pop	
48	D.H.T.	2.1	1995–present	Trance/Eurodance	
49	Milk Inc./Regi Penxten	2.1	1996–present	Electronica/House	
50	Burt Blanca	2	1958–present	Rock'n'roll	
51	Christian Adam	2	1973–present	Pop	
52	Philippe Lafontaine	2	1978–present	Pop	
53	M.I.K.E.	2	1992–present	Trance	
54	Soulsister/Jan Leyers/Paul Michiels	2	1986-1997, 2007	Pop	

Note - Numbers may not be accurate. International album and single sales were counted.

== Sources ==
- The official websites of the artists
- IFPI
- History of the Belgian music industry
- Best selling Belgian artists
