= Lou Deprijck =

Belgian singer and record producer (1946–2023)

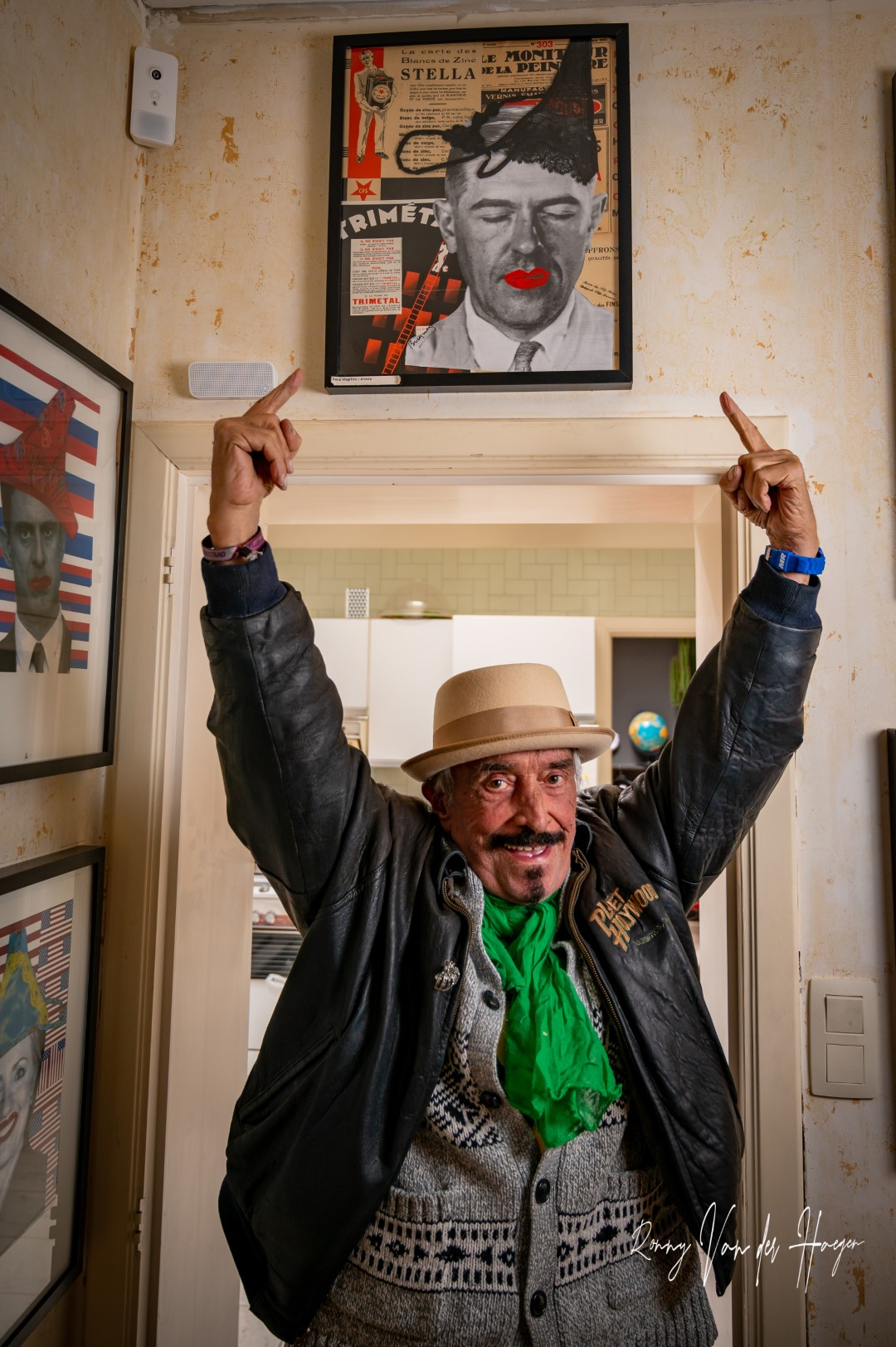

Background information
- Born: Francis Jean Deprijck; 11 January 1946; Lessines, Belgium
- Died: 19 September 2023 (aged 77) Brussels, Belgium
- Genres: Latin pop, disco, samba, pop-punk, ska
- Occupations: Singer, composer, songwriter, producer
- Years active: 1972–2023
- Formerly of: Two Man Sound, Lou & the Hollywood Bananas

Francis Jean "Lou" Deprijck (French pronunciation: [lu dəpʁɛk]; 11 January 1946 – 19 September 2023) was a Belgian singer and record producer. He was a major figure in the Belgian pop scene of the 1970s and 1980s, with more than 20 million copies of his compositions sold worldwide, making him one of the best selling Belgian artists. Deprijck is best known for having co-written with Yves Lacomblez and produced the 1977 Plastic Bertrand single "Ça plane pour moi".

== Music career ==
=== Early work and Two Man Sound ===
His first group Pop' Liberty 6 had a complete flop in 1967 with "Je suis pop et tout à fait dingue". However he later found success with Two Man Sound, a Latin-pop outfit formed with Sylvain Vanholme of the Wallace Collection and Yvan Lacomblez. Two Man Sound sold over a million copies of their 1975 single "Charlie Brown", while the album Disco Samba, with its hugely successful title track, sold around 1.4 million copies in Latin America.

Deprijck also had a major 1978 solo success in France and Belgium with ska/reggae song "Kingston, Kingston", under the moniker Lou & The Hollywood Bananas.

=== Plastic Bertrand and Viktor Lazlo ===
In the English-speaking world, Deprijck's best known hit was "Ça plane pour moi", which he co-wrote and produced for Plastic Bertrand.

Deprijck always maintained that he performed the vocals on the original recording of "Ça plane pour moi", and the question remains controversial. In 2006 the Brussels court of appeal, upholding the decision of a lower court, found that Bertrand was the sole interpreter of the song. In 2010 an expert opinion produced for another case suggested the 1977 vocalist had a picard accent, like Deprijck's. This did not, however, alter the 2006 ruling, and media statements by Deprijk to the effect that his claim to be the singer had been "recognised by the justice system" were ill-founded. (All of the proceedings between 2006 and 2010 arose from disputes between the record company AMC, which owned the catalogue of Plastic Bertrand's Belgian label RKM, and Deprijck, whom it believed to be making inappropriate use of the material. Deprijck never took the question of who sang what to court himself.)

In an interview prompted by the 2010 episode, Bertrand appeared to admit that he was not the vocalist, but in a follow-up interview the next day he denied this, saying he was being ironic and had been trapped, and threatening legal action. This echoed a similar incident in the 1990s when Bertrand seemed to tell journalist Gilles Verlant that he was not the singer before quickly retracting. Since 2010, Bertrand has consistently said that he is the performer on the original recording, and this remains the position in law.

In the 1980s, Deprijck was also the creative force behind the success of Viktor Lazlo, born Sonia Dronier, whom he met at Le Mirano nightclub in Brussels. She initially did backing vocals for Lou & the Hollywood Bananas before taking the name Viktor Lazlo from a character in the 1942 film Casablanca at Deprijck's suggestion. He produced the self-titled album Viktor Lazlo in 1987 for her, as well as the album Hot & Soul in 1989.

In 1984, calling himself Lou Van Houten, Deprijck released the album Collures with Boris Bergman as Les Epatants.

== Personal life ==
Deprijck was born in Lessines on 11 January 1946. He moved to Brussels in 1964 to work for the Régie des Télegraphes et Téléphones, at the time the telephone company of Belgium, and then moved to Thailand 25 years later.

Deprijck resided largely near Pattaya, Thailand. The story of his life in Thailand was shown in the VTM TV channel documentary Vlamingen in Pattaya (Flemings in Pattaya) as part of the Belgian news program Telefacts. Life in Pattaya inspired him to rewrite the text of his most famous song "Kingston, Kingston" into "Pattaya, Pattaya", which soon became the unofficial hymn of Pattaya.

Lou Deprijck died on 19 September 2023, shortly after being admitted to a Brussels hospital. He was 77.

== See also ==
- List of best-selling Belgian artists
