= Charlie Brown (Benito di Paula song) =

1974 single by Benito di Paula

- 1975 German 7" single cover

Single by Benito di Paula
- Released: October 1, 1974
- Recorded: 1974
- Studio: Estúdio Reunidos, São Paulo
- Genre: Samba
- Length: 4:17
- Label: Copacabana, Vogue, Carnaby, Telefunken, Eleven
- Composer: Benito di Paula
- Lyricist: Benito di Paula

Benito di Paula singles chronology
"Além de tudo" (1974)	"Charlie Brown" (1974)	"Beleza Que Você é Mulher" (1975)

Music video
- "Charlie Brown" on YouTube

"Charlie Brown" is a 1974 samba single by Brazilian singer Benito di Paula, who composed and wrote the lyrics. It became a major hit song and a signature song for di Paula. In 1975, he released the song "Charlie Brown" abroad, which became very successful internationally, to the point that it was covered by international artists in Portuguese, as well as in their languages. The title refers to the character Charlie Brown from the cartoon series Peanuts.

== Composition and lyrics ==
This song took 5 years to compose, starting in 1969, the year di Paula was living in an Italian boarding house in Santos, where he saw the other residents reading Peanuts comics. When di Paula asked what was going on in the comics, he asked for the drawings to be translated, and with that, he became enchanted with the character Charlie Brown, and decided to write a song about him, inviting the fictional character to Brazil.

The song's lyrics are full of references to Brazil, its diverse relief and culture, and its famous people.

In the second verse of the song, di Paula mentions his fellow musicians Vinícius de Moraes, Jorge Ben Jor and Luiz Gonzaga, who were part of the Brazilian political opposition to the ruling Brazilian military junta at the time, and the Rio de Janeiro football team CR Flamengo, which has the biggest national fan base.

In its fourth verse, he makes a reference to São Paulo by its nickname "Terra da garoa" ("Land of drizzle"), he mentions a quote from the musician Caetano Veloso, the state of Bahia, the artist Carlos Imperial, and the verse ends citing the Rio Carnival, idealizing the Brazil in his heart.

== Release ==
It was first recorded in 1974 at Estúdio Reunidos in São Paulo by the record label Copacabana, being his fourth album for the same label and was released on October 1, 1974, which became his most popular and most played song.

The song was very well received in Brazil, becoming the biggest hit in the national music charts in 1975. Soon after being released, di Paula was invited to be part of the Brazilian delegation that participated at Midem (International Record and Music Publishing Market) in Cannes, France, where he was given three minutes to present some music, and he chose " Charlie Brown". It was very well received by European audiences as well. The song became even more popular in Europe, after the Belgian trio Two Man Sound, covered it in Portuguese in a disco-samba version in 1975.

== Track listings ==
7" (Copacabana)

1. "Charlie Brown" – 4:17

7" (Vogue/Carnaby)

1. "Charlie Brown" – 4:17
2. "Beleza que é você mulher" – 4:43

7" (Telefunken)

1. "Charlie Brown" – 4:15
2. "Pare, olhe e viva" – 3:55

7" (Eleven)

1. "Charlie Brown" – 4:17
2. "Na casa de sinha" – 3:35

== Other recordings ==
"Charlie Brown"

Single by Two Man Sound
- Released: January 1976
- Recorded: December 1975
- Genre: Samba, disco
- Length: 3:19
- Label: Durium, Pink Elephant, Warner Music Group, Vogue
- Composer: Benito di Paula
- Lyricist: Benito di Paula
- Producer: Roland Kluger

Two Man Sound singles chronology
"Vini Vini" (1973)	"Charlie Brown" (1976)	"Oye Come Va" (1976)

Music video
- "Meu amigo Charlie Brown" on YouTube

- The song was most notably covered by the Belgian trio Two Man Sound, in its original Portuguese version, but in faster-paced disco-samba style in 1975. It peaked at number seven in Germany and peaked at number one in Belgium in the music charts in 1975.

=== Adaptations in other languages ===
Cover versions of Charlie Brown in other languages
Artist	Album	Details
Ton van Kluyve	Mijn Hoempapa	Released: 1975 (Netherlands); Dutch-language adaptation; Format: 7"
Benny	Amigo Charly Brown/Wir Sind Nicht Mehr Zu Jung	Released: 1975 (Germany) (Austria) (Switzerland); German-language adaptation; Format: 7"
Guy Mardel	Prends Des Vacances Charlie	Released: 1975 (France) (Belgium); French-language adaptation; Format: 7"
Sylvia Vrethammar	Sylvia	Released: 1976 (Sweden); English-language adaptation; Format: 7"
Vikingarna	Kramgoa Låtar 3	Released: 1976 (Sweden); Swedish-language adaptation; Format: LP
Virve Rosti	Tuolta Saapuu Charlie Brown	Released: 1976 (Finland); Finnish-language adaptation; Format: 7"
Emmanouil Iordanopoulos	Giordanelli	Released: 1976 (Greece); Greek-language adaptation; Format: LP
Pavel Liška	Gong 3	Released: 1977 (Czechoslovakia); Czech-language adaptation; Format: LP
Trio Express	Express	Released: 1983 (Romania); Romanian-language adaptation; Format: LP
Bjørn & Okay	Hej Med Dig	Released: 1997 (Denmark); Danish-language adaptation; Format: LP
Kuldsed Lindid	Kaua	Released: 2001 (Estonia); Estonian-language adaptation; Format: LP
