= Two Man Sound =

Belgian pop band

- Yves Lacomblez, Sylvain Vanholme and Lou Deprijck in 1977

Background information
- Origin: Brussels, Belgium
- Genres: Disco, Eurodisco
- Years active: 1971–1990, 2006
- Labels: Vogue. WEA, Ariola, Pink Elephant
- Past members: Lou Deprijck; Sylvain Vanholme; Yves Lacomblez

Two Man Sound was a Belgian pop trio of the 1970s. Their style combined the disco music typical of the era with samba and bossa nova. Their signature hits were their version of "Charlie Brown" released in 1975, which was a success in Belgium and Italy, and a Latin medley of Brazilian pop songs called "Disco Samba", released in 1977. The latter became a huge European hit in the early 1980s, with repeated hit-listings in Euro Charts from 1983 through 1986. Other songs were "Capital Tropical", released in 1977, which peaked at no. 11 on the US Dance Chart, and "Que Tal America", a samba hit released in 1979, which became an "underground disco anthem" in North America.

== Other projects ==
Band members Lacomblez and Deprijck were also record producers and songwriters who penned the international 1977 hit "Ça plane pour moi" for fellow Belgian artist Plastic Bertrand. Deprijck, who was also producer on "Ça plane pour moi", appeared under numerous other pseudonyms during his career; finding fame in several European countries for his work with "Lou and the Hollywood Bananas" who produced the minor 1978 ska hit, "Kingston, Kingston". Two Man Sound's 1979 track "Que Tal America" was a minor hit (no. 46) in the UK Singles Chart.

== Group members ==
- Lou Deprijck
- Sylvain Vanholme, formerly of Wallace Collection
- Yvan Lacomblez, often known by the nickname "Pipou"

== Discography ==
- 1972 - Rubro Negro (Pink Elephant)
- 1973 - Vini Vini (Pink Elephant)
- 1976 - Charlie Brown (WEA)
- 1977 - Oye Come Va (WEA)
- 1978 - Disco Samba (Vogue) distributed by JDC Records
- 1979 - Que Tal America (Vogue)
- 1980 - Two Man Sound (Vogue)
- 1990 - The Best of... (CD, Ariola Records)

== See also ==
- Brigitte Bardot (song)
