= Wando (singer) =

Brazilian singer-songwriter

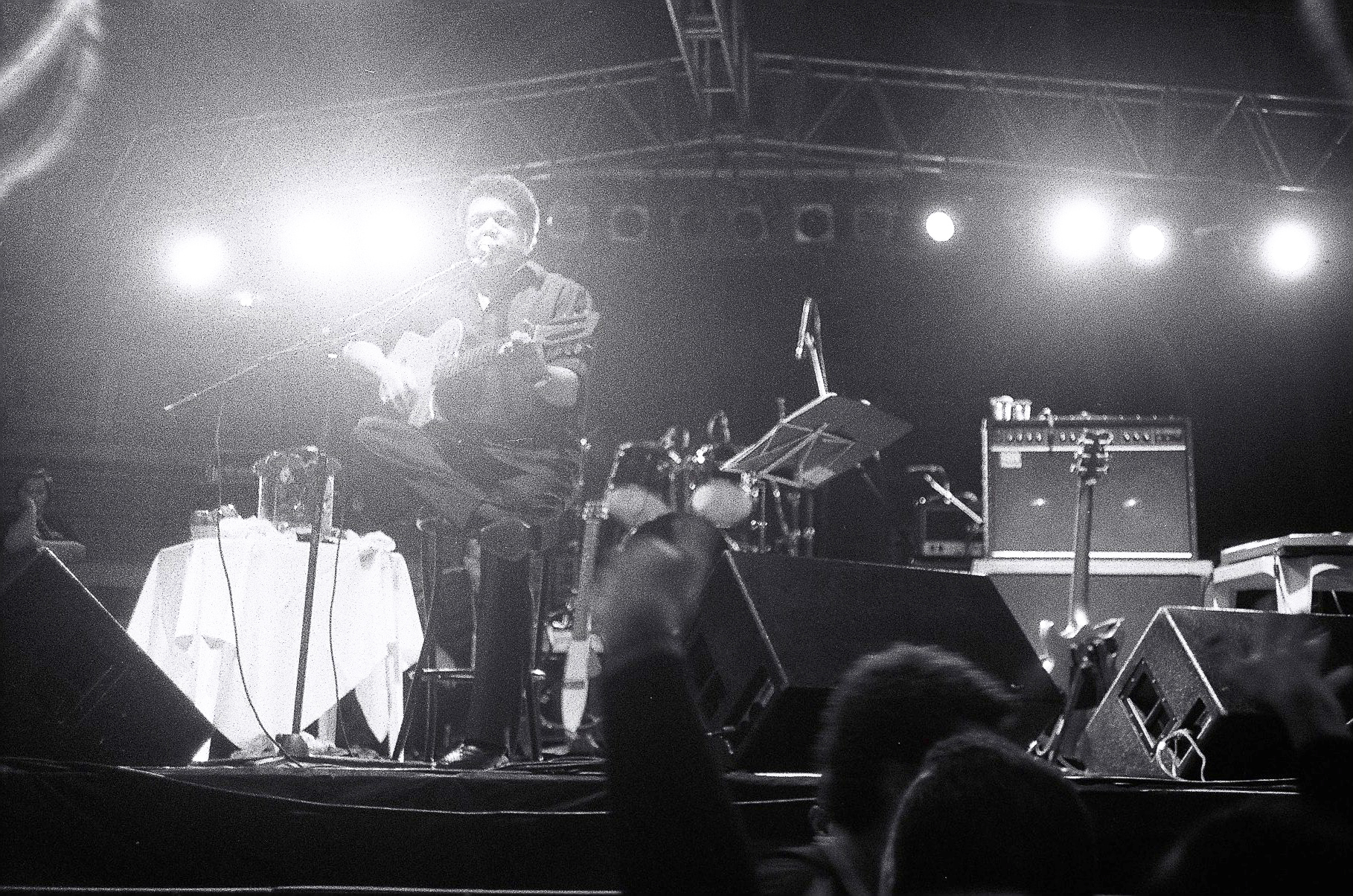
- Wando in 2009

Background information
- Born: Wanderley Alves dos Reis; October 2, 1945; Bom Jardim de Minas
- Origin: Minas Gerais, Brazil
- Died: February 8, 2012 (aged 66)
- Genres: Samba-joia, Brega
- Occupations: Singer, songwriter
- Years active: 1969–2012
- Website: www.wando.com.br

Wanderley Alves dos Reis, better known as Wando (Brazilian Portuguese: [ˈvɐ̃du], October 2, 1945 – February 8, 2012), was a Brazilian singer-songwriter.

Wanderley won the nickname Wando from his grandmother. As a child he moved from Cajuri to Juiz de Fora, where he majored in classical guitar and started dealing with music around 20 years. At that time he participated in music ensembles and has performed at dances in the region. Later moved to Volta Redonda (RJ), where he worked as a truck driver and marketer.

His career as singer began in 1969 and the success came in 1973. He composed for other singers of MPB, as Jair Rodrigues, who in 1974 recorded “O Importante é Ser Fevereiro”. "A Menina e o Poeta" was recorded by Roberto Carlos in his 1976 album "Moça" (1975), "Chora Coração" (1985), which was part of the soundtrack of the Brazilian soap opera Roque Santeiro, and especially the song "Fogo e Paixão", released the album "O Mundo Romântico de Wando" in 1988, were his greatest hits.

On January 27, 2012, Wando was admitted to ICU of a hospital in Belo Horizonte with serious heart problems. He underwent an emergency angioplasty and began to breathe on appliances. His death (cardiopulmonary arrest) was announced at 8 am on February 8, 2012, at the Biocor Institute in Nova Lima, Minas Gerais.

== Discography ==
- Glória a Deus No Céu e Samba na Terra (1973)
- Wando (1975)
- Porta do Sol (1976)
- Ilusão (1977)
- Gosto de Maçã (1978)
- Gazela (1979)
- Bem-vindo (1980)
- Pelas Noites do Brasil (1981)
- Fantasia Noturna (1982)
- Coisa Cristalina (1983)
- Vulgar e Comum é Não Morrer de Amor (1985)
- Ui-Wando Paixão (1986)
- Coração Aceso (1987)
- O Mundo Romântico de Wando (1988)
- Obsceno (1988)
- Tenda dos Prazeres (1990)
- Depois da Cama (1992)
- Mulheres (1993)
- Dança Romântica (1995)
- O Ponto G da História (1996)
- Chacundum (1997)
- Palavras Inocentes (1998)
- S.O.S. de Amor (1999) - Live
- Picada de Amor (2000)
- Fêmeas (2012)
