= Wallace Collection (band) =

Belgian pop rock band

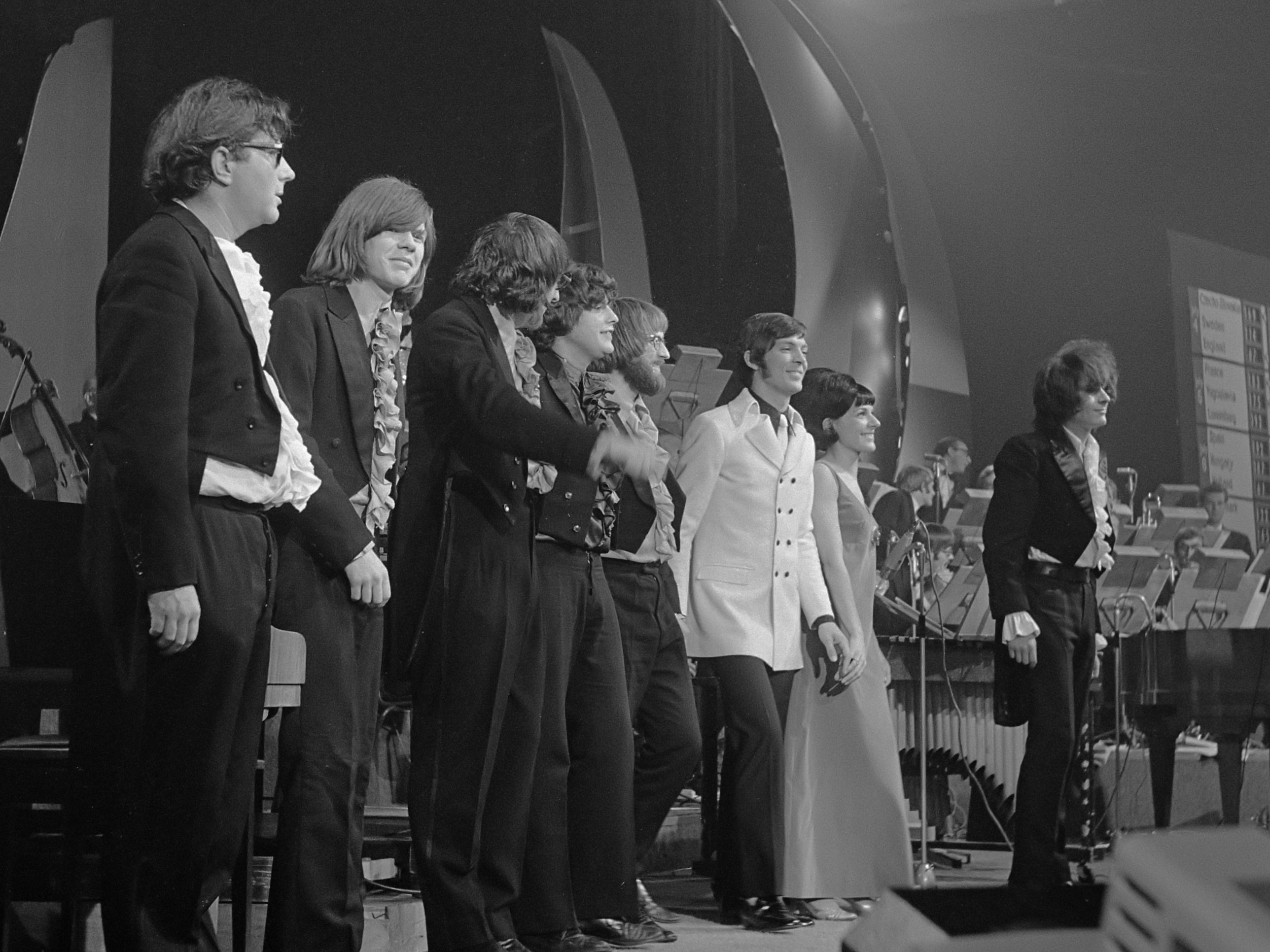
- Wallace Collection (1969)

Background information
- Origin: Belgium
- Genre: Pop rock
- Years active: 1968–1971
- Label: EMI
- Members: Sylvain Vanholme; Christian Janssens; Freddy Nieuland; Marc Hérouet; Cédric Murrath
- Past members: Raymond Vincent; Jacques Namotte

Wallace Collection were a Belgian pop rock group active in the late 1960s and early 1970s. They are best known for their 1969 international hit "Daydream".

== History ==
Wallace Collection was formed by members of a group called Sylvester's Team, three of whom began playing under the name 16th Century along with bassist Christian Janssens and two members of the Belgian National Philharmonic Orchestra, Raymond Vincent and Jacques Namotte.

Wallace Collection was based in Britain, naming itself after the famous museum adjacent to the headquarters of its record label, EMI. Its debut studio album, Laughing Cavalier, was recorded at Abbey Road Studios and was released in 1969. The single "Daydream" became a hit in 21 countries, including going #1 in Belgium. In the wake of its success, the group toured Europe, the United States, Mexico, and South America. It also composed the soundtrack to a French film, La Maison, in 1970. Later singles, such as "Love" and "Serenade", were hits in Belgium and some other countries but did not reach the level of "Daydream", and the group split up in 1971. In 2005 the group re-formed with an altered lineup.

== Members ==
1969–1980

- Sylvain Vanholme (guitar, vocals)
- Freddy Nieuland (drums, vocals, died 10 January 2008)
- Marc Hérouet (keyboards)
- Christian Janssens (bass)
- Raymond Vincent (violin, died 5 November 2018)
- Jacques Namotte (cello, died 23 December 2012)
- Genesio Di cesare (guitar, ¨ Take life a with grin¨, died 23 october 2024)

2005–present

- Sylvain Vanholme (guitar, vocals)
- Freddy Nieuland (drums, vocals, died 10 January 2008)
- Marc Hérouet (keyboards)
- Christian Janssens (bass)
- Cédric Murrath (violin)

== Members' work after Wallace Collection ==
=== Raymond Vincent ===
After Wallace Collection, Raymond Vincent started the band Esperanto which produced three albums on A&M, Esperanto Rock Orchestra, Danse Macabre and Last Tango. He also recorded an album of original compositions and songs for string quartet called 'Metronome' (on Izarra Records). He died on 5 November 2018, aged 75.

=== Sylvain Vanholme ===
After Wallace Collection Sylvain Vanholme joined songwriters 'Pipou' and Lou Deprijck in Latin influenced pop-combo Two Man Sound which scored a few international hits. Sylvain Vanholme also became a successful producer working with Belgian artists The Machines, The Kids, Gorky, Jo Lemaire & Flouze and others).

=== Marc Hérouet ===
Keyboard Player Marc Hérouet achieved limited success with Salix Alba.

== Discography ==
=== Albums ===
- Laughing Cavalier (EMI/Parlophone, 1969)*
- Serenade (EMI/Odeon, mai 1970)**
- Wallace Collection (EMI/Parlophone, 1970)**
- La Maison (Original Motion Picture Soundtrack, EMI/Odeon, 1970)
- Tax Vobiscum (Espera, 1981)
- The Best Of... The Wallace Collection (Ariola, 1990)
- Wallace Collection (EMI France, 1990)
- Candelights to Satellites (1992)*** (jamais édité)
- Live Concert with the Best of Wallace Collection (RM Records, 1999)
- Laughing Cavalier + Serenade (EMI Belgium, 2004)

*In the UK, 'Laughing Cavalier' was one of the last albums released in both MONO and STEREO format by EMI. However, it is not a dedicated mono mix but a fold down of the stereo mix (as was the case for the mono 'Yellow Submarine' album by The Beatles).

In the US Capitol released a 12-track version of the album, retitling it 'Wallace Collection' in the process.

**The band's 2nd album for EMI was simply titled 'Wallace Collection' [no relation to the Capitol American version of their first LP] worldwide, but it came out in France with a distinctive colour cover featuring a slightly alternate shot of the band and was titled 'Serenade', which is the unofficial title that album is commonly referred to.

***The 'Candlelights to Satellites' album was a proposed comeback album recorded 1989–1990 featuring the band's original lineup, minus Jacques Namotte. The final master, completed in January 1992, included new studio tracks as well as a selection of live tracks recorded on Feb. 13, 1991 at the Palais des Beaux-Arts, Brussels. Management and publishing issues arose and the album was left unreleased. Only one single (an edit of 'Velvet Moon' and 'Politicians') was published, in January 1991.

=== Singles ===
- "Daydream" (EMI, 1969)
- Rêverie/ Le Monde Est Fou (EMI, 1969)
- Love / Fly Me To The Earth (EMI, 1969)
- Dear Beloved Secretary / Hello Suzannah (EMI, 1969)
- Serenade / Walk On Out (EMI, 1970)
- We Gotta Do Something New / Where (EMI, 1970)
- Parlez-Moi d’Amour / Stop Teasing Me (Original Motion Picture Soundtrack from the movie “La Maison”) (EMI, 1970)
- Il Sorriso, Il Paradiso / Just A Little Matter (EMI, 1971)
- Stay / My Way Of Loving You (Original Motion Picture Soundtrack from the movie “Un Beau Monstre”) (EMI, 1971)
- You’re Gone / Hitting The Road (EMI, 1971)
- Like A Rose On The Table / Listen To My Song (EMI, 1971)
- Baby Love (Original Motion Picture Soundtrack from the movie “Les Intrus”) / Think About Tomorrow (EMI, 1971)
- Anthinea / Deep Down In My Bed (EMI, 1972)
- Les Avions Décollent / Mais Qui Sont Les Sauvages (with Jacques Hustin) (EMI, 1972)
- Take Life With A Grin / Together (EMI, 1980)
- Jack / Tax Vobiscum (Espera, 1980)
- Velvet Moon* / Politicians* (Wallace Collection, 1991)
- Daydream 93 / Daydream (Concert Version) (Wallace Collection, 1993)

As with many bands from the late 60's/early 70's, singles were released in MONO or STEREO depending on which part of the world you lived. In the UK, EMI started to issue singles in stereo in the late spring of 1969. But in France and in some other European countries, buyers of EMI records had to wait until mid-1972 to be able to purchase local singles in stereo. Because the bulk of Wallace Collection singles from 1969–1971 were primarily French releases, it is the mono versions of many of these songs that are generally available.

However, a few true stereo mix exist on foreign pressings.

'Daydream'/'Baby I Don't Mind' : the US and Canadian pressings of this single are not only in stereo but also features a unique mix of both sides (single tracking, different placement of instruments...).

'Dear Beloved Secretary'/'Hello Suzannah' : the German pressing is the only place where a true stereo mix of the 45-only track 'Hello Suzannah' is available.

'Serenade'/'Walk On Out' : the UK and German (and probably Japanese) pressings of this single have a true stereo mix of the 45-only track 'Walk On Out'. Besides, these pressings feature a unique single edit of 'Serenade', different from short version more widely available on the French, Italian, Spanish... mono pressings.

'Baby Love'/'Thing About Tomorrow' : unique stereo mixes of these two soundtrack songs appear on a 1972 Mexican EP featuring 'Baby Love'/'Tension on side 1, 'Think About Tomorrow'/'Adagio' on side 2. These two true stereo mixes can also be found on the Japanese single.

The Italian-only single 'Il Sorriso, Il Paradiso/Just A Little Matter' was a stereo release.

Caution: contrary to the STEREO mention that appears on the cover and on the label, the Japanese pressing of 'Stay'/'My Way Of Loving You' is the mono mix.''
