= Axelle Red discography =

Discography of the Belgian pop singer

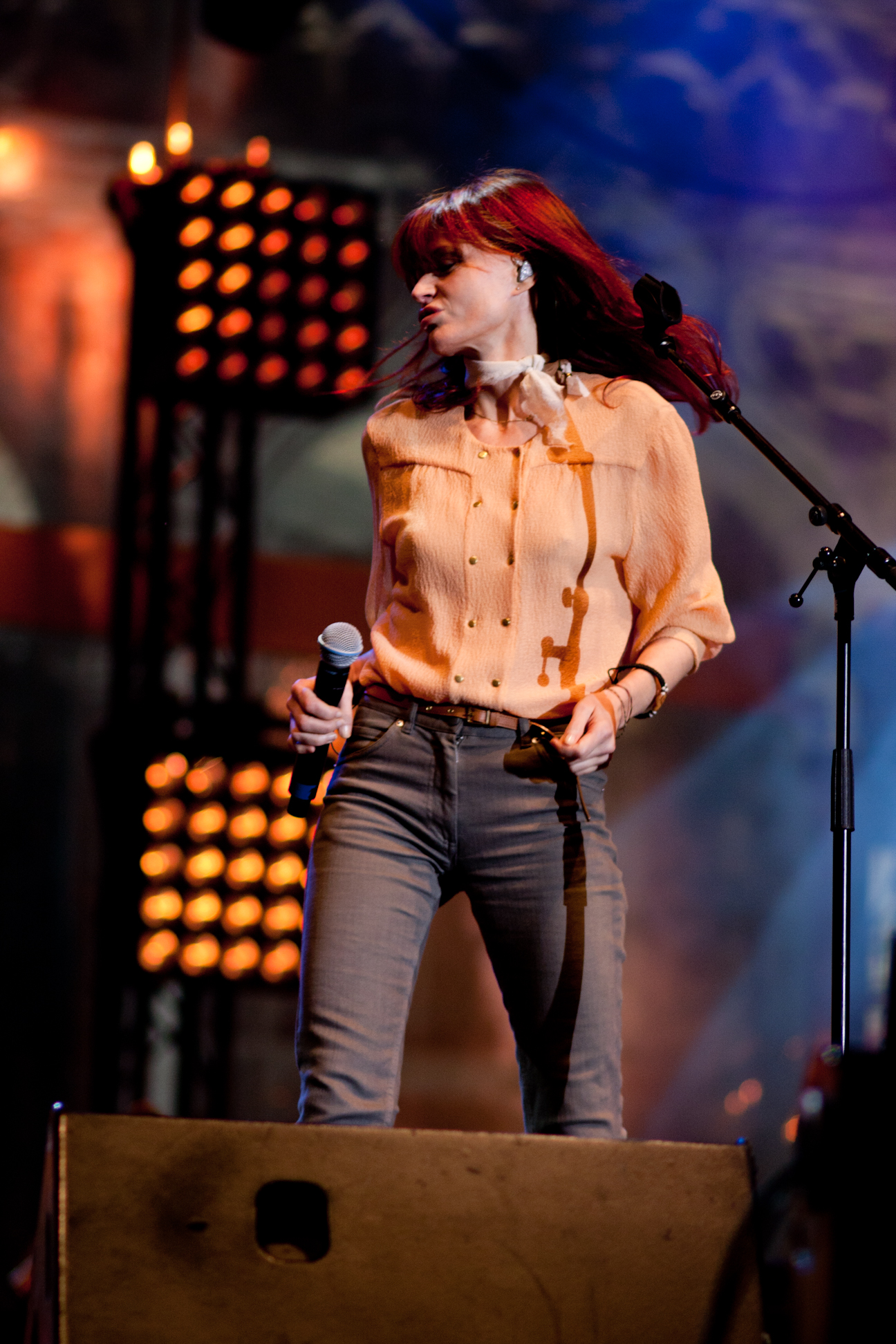
- Red performing in 2011
- Studio albums: 11
- Live albums: 1
- Compilation albums: 2
- Singles: 34
- Music videos: 2
- Box sets: 1

This article presents the discography of the Belgian pop singer Axelle Red.

== Albums ==
=== Studio albums ===
Year	Title	Sales (France)	Certification		Peak position				
Year	Title	Sales (France)	FRA	BEL	FRA	FRA (DD)	BEL (WA)	BEL (FL)	SWI
1993	Sans plus attendre	350,000	Platinum (1996)	5 x Platinum	2	—	19	16	—
1996	À tâtons	650,000	2 x Platinum (1999)	4 x Platinum	5	—	6	3	—
1998	Con solo pensarlo	—	—	—	—	—	5	1	—
1999	Toujours moi	450,000	Platinum (2000)	3 x Platinum	1	—	4	6	66
2002	Face A / Face B	160,000	2 x Gold (2003)	Platinum	13	—	4	4	37
2006	Jardin secret	60,000	Gold (2006)	3 x Platinum (2007)	6	5	2	1	44
2008	Sisters & Empathy	—	—	Gold (2009)	—	—	19	3	—
2011	Un cœur comme le mien	18,000	—	Gold (2011)	23	—	7	4	49
2013	Rouge ardent	22,000	—	Platinum (2013)	22	—	2	1	73
2018	Exil	—	—	—	—	—	5	4	—
2022	The Christmas Album	—	—	—	—	—	44	14	—

=== Live albums ===
Year	Title	Sales certified (France)	Certification	Peak position			
Year	Title	Sales certified (France)	FRA	FRA	BEL (WA)	BEL (FL)	SWI
2000	Alive (in concert)	100,000	Gold (2000)	20	23	25	96

=== Compilations ===
Year	Title	Sales certified (France)	Certification			Peak position			
Year	Title	Sales certified (France)	FRA	BEL (WA)	BEL (FL)	FRA	BEL (WA)	BEL (FL)	SWI
2004	French Soul	100,000	Gold (2004)	Gold (2004)	Gold (2004)	4	12	10	45
2015	The Songs (Acoustic)					—	13	7	—
2023	AR30					—	23	81	—

=== Box sets ===
Year	Title	Date of release	Peak position
Year	Title	Date of release	BEL (FL)
2003	Axelle Red	November, 2003	37

== DVDs ==
Year	Title	Date of release	Sales certified	Certification (France)	Peak position
Year	Title	Date of release	Sales certified	Certification (France)	FRA
2004	Live 2004 / French Soul	November 18, 2004	25,000	Gold (2004)	20
2007	Le Tour de mon jardin secret	2007	—	—	—

== Singles ==
Year	Title	Sales certified	Certification (France)	Peak position				Album
Year	Title	Sales certified	Certification (France)	FRA	BEL (WA)	BEL (FL)	SWI	Album
1983	"Little Girls"	—	—	—	—	35	—	—
1985	"Back to Tokyo"	—	—	—	—	—	—	—
1989	"Kennedy Boulevard"	—	—	—	—	5	—	—
1991	"Aretha et moi"	—	—	—	—	34	—	—
1992	"Elle danse seule"	—	—	—	—	11	—	Sans plus attendre
1993	"Je t'attends"	—	—	13	—	22	—	Sans plus attendre
1993	"Sensualité"	250,000	Gold (1994)	2	—	6	—	Sans plus attendre
1993	"Le Monde tourne mal"	—	—	38	—	28	—	Sans plus attendre
1996	"À Tâtons"	—	—	—	30	35	—	À Tâtons
1997	"Rien que d'y penser"	—	—	—	—	48	—	À Tâtons
1997	"Mon Café"	—	—	—	—	48	—	À Tâtons
1997	"Ma Prière"	—	—	—	—	45	—	À Tâtons
1998	"À quoi ça sert"	—	—	45	—	—	—	À Tâtons
1998	"Rester femme"	125,000	Silver (1998)	9	20	22	—	À Tâtons
1998	"La Cour des Grands"	—	—	16	31	54	—	—
1999	"Ce Matin"	—	—	17	20	53	—	Toujours Moi
1999	"Faire des mamours"	—	—	—	—	—	—	Toujours Moi
1999	"Parce que c'est toi"	250,000	Gold (2000)	2	1	9	—	Toujours Moi
2000	"Bimbo à moi"	—	—	44	36	49	—	Toujours Moi
2000	"J'ai jamais dit (je serai ton amie)" (radio mix)	—	—	—	51	46	—	Toujours Moi
2001	"Aretha et moi" (live)	—	—	—	—	—	—	Alive (in concert)
2002	"Manhattan-Kaboul"	500,000	Platinum (2002)	2	4	34	37	French Soul
2002	"Je me fâche"	—	—	56	33	43	80	Face A / Face B
2003	"Pas maintenant"	—	—	61	23	—	—	Face A / Face B
2003	"Venez vers moi"	—	—	—	—	51	—	Face A / Face B
2003	"Toujours"	—	—	—	23	49	—	Face A / Face B
2004	"Gloria"	—	—	—	54	50	—	Face A / Face B
2004	"Je pense à toi"	—	—	—	12	44	—	French Soul
2005	"J'ai fait un rêve"	—	—	—	53	32	—	French Soul
2006	"Changer ma vie"	—	—	—	—	—	—	Jardin secret
2006	"Temps pour nous"	—	—	67	16	11	—	Jardin secret
2007	"Si tu savais (Janelle)"	—	—	—	55	51	—	Jardin secret
2007	"Naïve"	—	—	—	52	18	—	Jardin secret
2007	"Over 't Water"	—	—	—	—	4	—	—
2011	"La claque"	—	—	—	29	44	—	Une coeur comme le mienne
2013	"Rouge ardent"	—	—	89	13	8	—	Rouge ardent
2013	"Quelque part ailleurs"	—	—	—	61	53	—	Rouge ardent
2013	"Amour profond"	—	—	—	56	54	—	Rouge ardent
2014	"De mieux en mieux"	—	—	—	82	62	—	Rouge ardent
2017	"Who's Gonna Help You?"	—	—	—	46	38	—	Exil
2018	"Excusez-moi"	—	—	—	89	54	—	Exil
2018	"Signe ton nom"	—	—	—	70	78	—	Exil
2018	"Quand le jour se lève"	—	—	—	—	55	—	Exil
2019	"D'autres que nous" (with Ycare)	—	—	—	14	72	—	—
2021	"Santa Claus Is Coming to Town"	—	—	—	49	46	—	—
2026	"Chanter pour elles" (with Renaud)	—	—	—	—	48	—	—
