= 0110 =

2006 concerts in four Belgian cities on 1 October

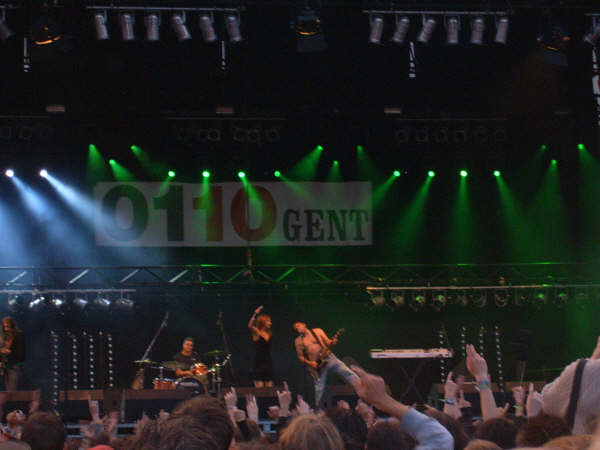
Gorki's frontman Luc De Vos and Isabelle A at the 0110 concert in Ghent

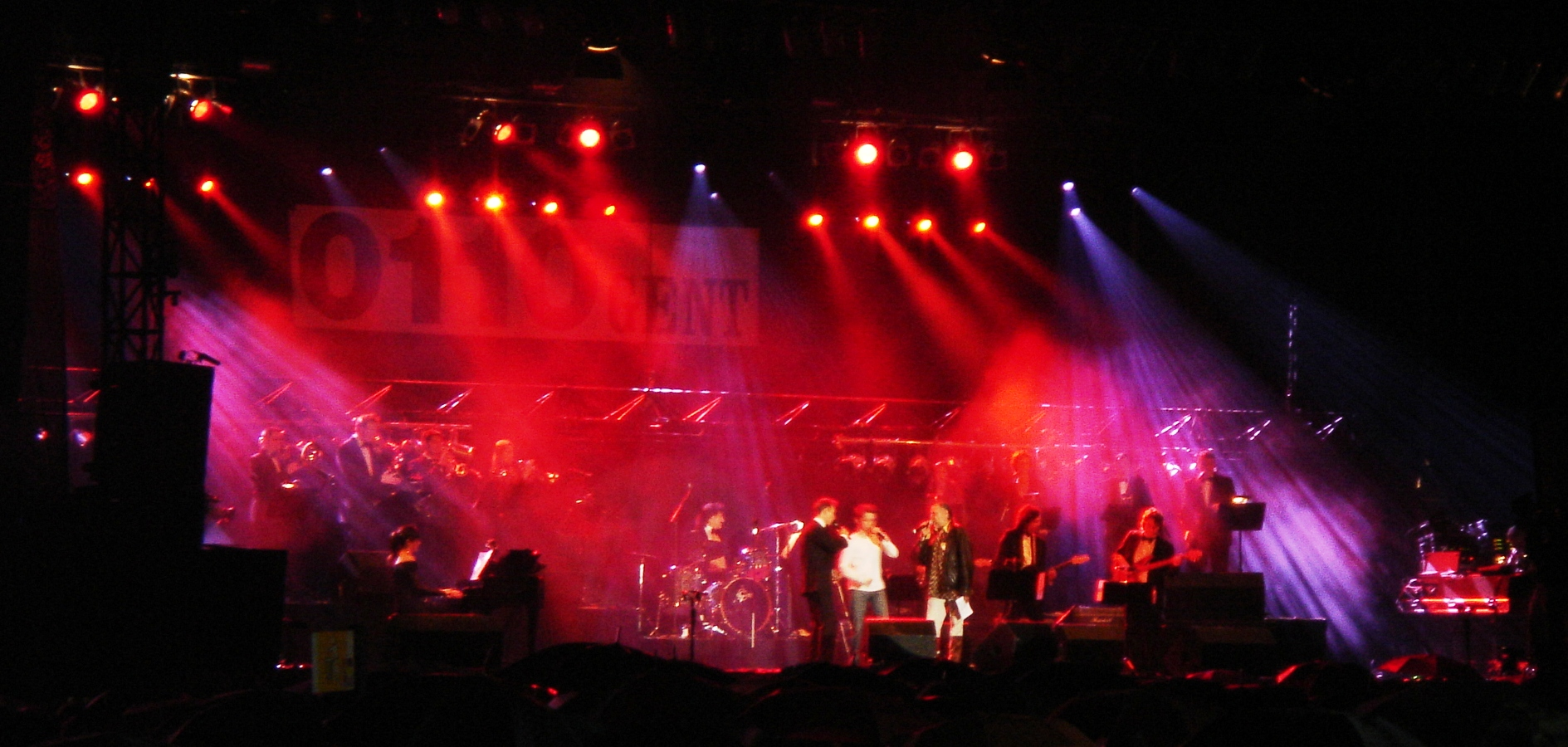
Helmut Lotti, Sioen and Roland on the stage, also in Ghent

The 0110 concerts, held on October 1, 2006, in Antwerp, Brussels, Charleroi and Ghent, were organised by dEUS frontman Tom Barman, Arno Hintjens and Frederik Sioen to promote tolerance in Belgian society, and "against Vlaams Belang, extremism and gratuitous violence".

According to the organisation, more than 100,000 people attended the concerts (around 50,000 in Antwerp, 25,000 in Ghent and Brussels, and 5,000 in Charleroi). Over 140 Belgian artists and groups, often in unprecedented combinations (like Daan and Plastic Bertrand, Gorki and Isabelle A, and so on), volunteered for the event. Tom Barman stated that this would not be a one-time initiative.

The concerts were sponsored by the Belgian National Lottery. Summer rock festivals like Sfinks, Pukkelpop, Folk Dranouter, Lokerse Feesten, Gentse Feesten and Suikerrock urged their public to support the event.

== 0110 controversy ==
The event preceded the 2006 municipal elections in Belgium by just one week, thus sending a political message as well.

The right wing opposition party Vlaams Belang wrote an open letter to famous Flemish artists, such as Clouseau, Helmut Lotti, Will Tura, Johan Verminnen and Laura Lynn, who were announced to participate, asking not to do so. The party requested the boycott because the event "only targets Vlaams Belang". One Vlaams Belang council member has called upon the readers of his web log to start a "mail bombardment" to the concerned artists. Critics speak of an intimidation campaign by the party. According to the Vlaams Belang however, the intimidation came from the organizers of the 0110 concerts and the complete Flemish media against Vlaams Belang, because the Flemish media were partizan of the concerts. According to the party, the media in Flanders is completely in the hands of the left-wing establishment. On the contrary, no Flemish artist would ever even think to participate in a festival organised by the Vlaams Belang, because this would be responded by the establishment by an ever-lasting boycott against the artist. On a party congress on 1 October, Filip Dewinter was quoted saying that "if it really were concerts against intolerance, the Vlaams Belang would have to be guest of honour", referring to the cordon sanitaire against the party.

Vlaams Belang sees this as a direct attack by the establishment, because the event is sponsored by the Belgian National Lottery. The National Lottery however decided upon the sponsoring contract before the political content was clear.

The Antwerp mayor Patrick Janssens (Different Socialist Party) disapproved of the concerts. The Vlaams Belang party also refers to the fact that the official website of the event specifically states that "Flanders deserves better than extreme right" and that Tom Barman, the main organizer, had already announced in 2005 that he was planning a concert "against Vlaams Belang" in October 2006.

== The concerts ==
=== Antwerp ===
Presentation: Bart Peeters
Location: Vlaamse en Waalse Kaai (Gedempte Zuiderdokken)

- Abdel zonder gel
- Wannes Van de Velde / Fixkes
- Jan De Smet
- Leki
- Sindicato Sonico
- Zita Swoon + Guests
- Scala
- Douzi
- Roland & Boogie Boy
- Clouseau
- Internationals (the concert was cancelled due to bad weather conditions).
- dEUS
- Fixkes

https://web.archive.org/web/20140513011523/https://www.proximusgoformusic.be/nl/item.php?text_id=145438

=== Brussels ===
Presentation: Annabelle Van Nieuwenhuyse and Sam Touzani
Location: Paleizenplein/place des Palais (in Dutch/French)

"De Laatste Showband" with guests:

- Bunny & Patrick Riguelle
- Ialma
- Ialma & Urban Trad & N'Faly Kouyaté
- Laura Lynn & David Bovée & Patrick
- Think of One & Marrakech Emballages Ensemble
- Guy Swinnen & Willy Willy & Sibo
- Willem Vermandere & Fabrizio Cassol
- La Fille d'Ernest & Willy Willy & Patrick
- Balo & Pili Ginga
- Johan Verminnen & Axl Peleman
- Manou Gallo & Laïla Amezian
- Jan Decorte Adamo & Mousta Largo
- Rey Cabrera & Jean-Louis Daulne
- Neeka & Philip Catherine & Patrick Riguelle
- A Brand
- Baï Kamara Jr. & Dani Klein
- Lange Jojo
- Sttellla & Lange Jojo
- Two Man Sound
- Laura Claycomb & Stijn
- James Deano & UMAN & JMX
- Rocco Granata & Roland
- Réjane & Patrick
- Frank Vander linden & Eté 67
- Monsoon & Sacha Toorop
- Jaune Toujours & Monsoon & Fabrizio Cassol
- Saule & Lio
- Marie Daulne & Fabrizio Cassol
- Viktor Lazlo & Daan
- Hooverphonic
- Laïs
- Axelle Red & Akro
- Plastic Bertrand
- Arno & Plastic Wallace Collection

=== Charleroi ===
Location: Spiroudome

- Super carolo Band
  - Prïba 2000
  - Jeff Bodart
  - William Dunker/Aldo Granato
  - Marka
- Abou Mehdi (1 slam)
- Hollywood Porn Star
  - Malibu Stacy (Dave)
  - My Little cheap Dictaphone
- Messbass 1 slam et 1 rap
- Vincent Venet
  - Miam Monster Miam
  - Sophie galet
  - Marie Warnant
- KLM 1 slam et 1 rap
- Ete 67
  - Jeronimo
  - Montevideo
- front stage: Inox 1 slam 1 rap
- Machiavel
  - Beverly jo Scott
  - tbc
- front stage: Abou Mehdi 1 slam et 1 rap
- collectif dub reggae Ashanti 3000, Omar Perry, Mika
- KLM 1 slam et Messbass 1 rap
- Les pleureurs
  - Saule
  - Lio
  - Sacha Toorop
  - Adamo
- Abou Mehdi 1 slam et Inox 1 rap
- Super carolo
  - Band Marka, Priba 2000
  - William Dunker, Prïba 2000
  - Sttellla (Jlfonck)+ Prïba 2000
  - Super Carolo band full/FINAL
  - DJ Globul/ Fabrice Lig

=== Ghent ===
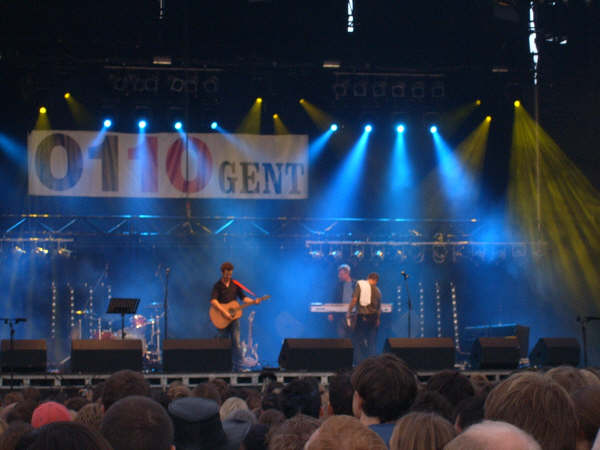
Wouter Deprez at the 0110 concert in Ghent.

Presentation: Wim Oosterlinck
Location: NMBS parking (St. Pietersstation)

- X!nk
- Monza (special guest Thé Lau)
- Gunter Lamoot
- Living Roots I (starring Bert Ostyn, Dirk Blanchart, Kris De Bruyne, Kommil Foo)
- Hadise
- Living Roots II (starring Jan De Campenaere, Gert Bettens, Djamel, PJDS)
- Abdelli
- 't Hof van Commerce
- Wouter Deprez
- Luc De Vos + girlfriends (Isabelle A)
- Kamagurka
- Sioen
- Will Tura
- Arid
- Helmut Lotti

== Book ==
In 2008 Belgian author Bart Van Lierde wrote the crime novel 0110: the premise is a terrorist act during the 0110 concerts in Antwerp. The main question is which political party ordered the attack: Vlaams Belang, as this party is convinced that the concerts are held to influence the outcome of the municipal elections; or the other parties, as the outcome indeed may be influenced if Vlaams Belang will be found guilty.
