= Wouter Van Belle =

Belgian record producer

Wouter Van Belle is a Belgian musician and producer. He is known for his work with Flip Kowlier, Gorki, Noordkaap, Arno, Axelle Red, Yevgueni, Novastar and Racoon. He scored as producer four number-one albums in Flanders and one in the Netherlands, and had top three singles in Flanders, France and the Netherlands. He is also the keyboard player for Dead Man Ray.

== Career ==
One of Van Belle's first productions was Gorky, the debut album of Belgian band Gorki. Van Belle was responsible for much of the sound and melody of the song Mia, which he turned from a punkrock song into a piano ballad. Despite never being released as a single, it became a classic which was voted the best song ever by the listeners of Studio Brussel and best Belgian song ever by the listeners of Radio 1. Van Belle not only produced the album, but also created the piano melody for the song. The number 2 song in the above mentioned list of best Belgian songs ever, Als ze lacht by Yevgueni, was also produced by Van Belle. In the 2005 version of that all-time Flemish songs list, he was involved as producer, mixer, writer and/or musician with 18 of the 100 songs.

In 1994 he won the Zamu Music Award for Best Producer.

He created his own label "Petrol" in 2000, to release an album he produced for Flip Kowlier which was then rejected by his original label. Ocharme ik reached #18 in the Flemish charts, and Van Belle would continue to release music on his own label, not only by Kowlier but also by Yevgueni and Gabriel Rios. In 2006 he released a solo album, Wow/Flutter.

In 2011 he was one of the four judges on Idool, the Flemish version of British TV show Pop Idol.

In 2020, he was inducted into the "Eregalerij" (Hall of Fame) of Radio 2, the largest radio station in Flanders, for his "large influence on Belgian music" The Hall of Fame lauded his work as a producer and as talent developer with e.g. Axelle Red and Flip Kowlier.

In 2022 and 2025, Van Belle contributed as a musician to the recording of Poldoore's albums Soft Focus and Chroma Dream.

== Charted singles ==
=== As writer or composer ===
- Arno, Vive ma liberté (1993), reached #48 in the Flemish charts
- Margriet Hermans, Alle mooie mannen zijn zo lelijk... (als ik je zie) (1990), #53 on the Dutch charts

=== As producer ===
- Axelle Red
  - A quoi ça sert (1996), reached #45 in the French charts
  - À tâtons (1996), reached #30 in Wallonia and #35 in Flanders
  - Elle danse seule (1992), #11 in Flanders
  - Je t'attends, #113 in France and #22 in Flanders
  - Le monde tourne mal (1993), #28 in Flanders and #38 in France
  - Rester femme (1996), #9 in France
  - Sensualité (1996), #2 in France (remained in the charts for 46 weeks) and #6 in Belgium
- Belgian Asociality
  - De gefrustreerde automobilist (1995), #50 in Flanders
  - Morregen (1994), #47 in Flanders
- Flip Kowlier
  - Directeur (2013), #41 in Flanders
  - Mo ba nin (2010), #30 in Flanders
- Gorki/Gorky (band changed name)
  - Anja (1990), #36 in Flanders
  - Lieve kleine Piranha (1991), #50 in Flanders
  - Soms vraagt een mens zich af (1992), #32 in Flanders
- Kid Safari, Blue (1994), #38 in Flanders
- MC Baker & The PCB, Don't Mess It Up (1991), #29 in Flanders
- Noordkaap
  - Ik hou van u (1995), #22 in Flanders
  - Satelliet Suzy (1996), #21 in Flanders
- Novastar
  - Lost & Blown Away (2000), #45 in Flanders and #92 in the Netherlands
  - Wrong (1999), #43 in Flanders and #47 in the Netherlands
- Paul Michiels, One Day At A Time (1998), #44 in FLanders
- Racoon
  - Brick By Brick (2014), #32 in the Netherlands
  - Don't Give Up The Fight (2011), #8 in the Netherlands
  - Freedom (2011), #81 in the Netherlands
  - Liverpool Rain (2011), #56 in the Netherlands
  - No Mercy (2011), #3 in the Netherlands
  - Oceaan (2012), #6 in the Netherlands (64 weeks in the charts)
  - Shoes Of Lightning (2013), #5 in the Netherlands
  - Took A Hit (2011), #57 in the Netherlands
- Stash, Sadness (2004), #2 in Belgium (33 weeks in the charts), #96 in the Netherlands
- Volt, They're Gonna Sample Me (1993), #50 in Flanders
- Wigbert, Ebbenhout blues (1991), #5 in Flanders

== Charted albums (as producer) ==
- Axelle Red
  - À Tâtons (1996), #3 in Flanders, #5 in France and #6 in Wallonia
  - Con solo pensarlo (1998), #1 in Flanders and #5 in Wallonia
  - Sans plus attendre (1993), #16 in Flanders, #19 in Wallonia, #46 in France
- Belgian Asociality, Adenosine Trifosfaat Preparaat (1995), #44 in Flanders
- BiezeBaaze, Wachten op misschien (2003), #31 in Flanders
- Flip Kowlier
  - Ocharme ik (2001), #18 in Flanders
  - In de fik (2004), #2 in Flanders
  - Otoradio (2010), #7 in Flanders
  - Cirque - De avonturen van W.M. Warlop (2013), #7 in Flanders
  - Geike Arnaert, Lost In Time (2019), #3 in Flanders
- Gorky, Gorky (1992), #39 in Flanders
- Laïs, Douce victime (2004), #3 in Flanders
- Noordkaap, Programma '96, #8 in Flanders
- Novastar, Novastar, #1 in Flanders and #66 in the Netherlands
- Paul Michiels, The Inner Child (1998), #10 in Flanders
- Racoon
  - Liverpool Rain (2011), #1 in the Netherlands and #109 in Flanders
- Stash
  - Blue Lanes (2007), #24 in Flanders
  - Rock 'n Roll Show (2005), #1 in Flanders
- Yevgueni
  - Aan de arbeid (2007), #13 in Flanders
  - Kannibaal (2004), #50 in Flanders
  - We zijn hier nu toch (2009), #1 in Flanders
