= Nekka-Nacht =

Music festival in Antwerp, Belgium

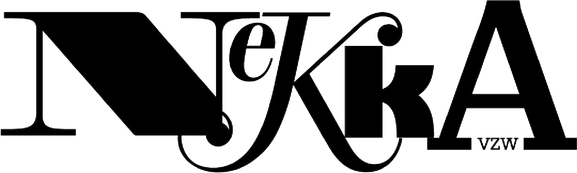

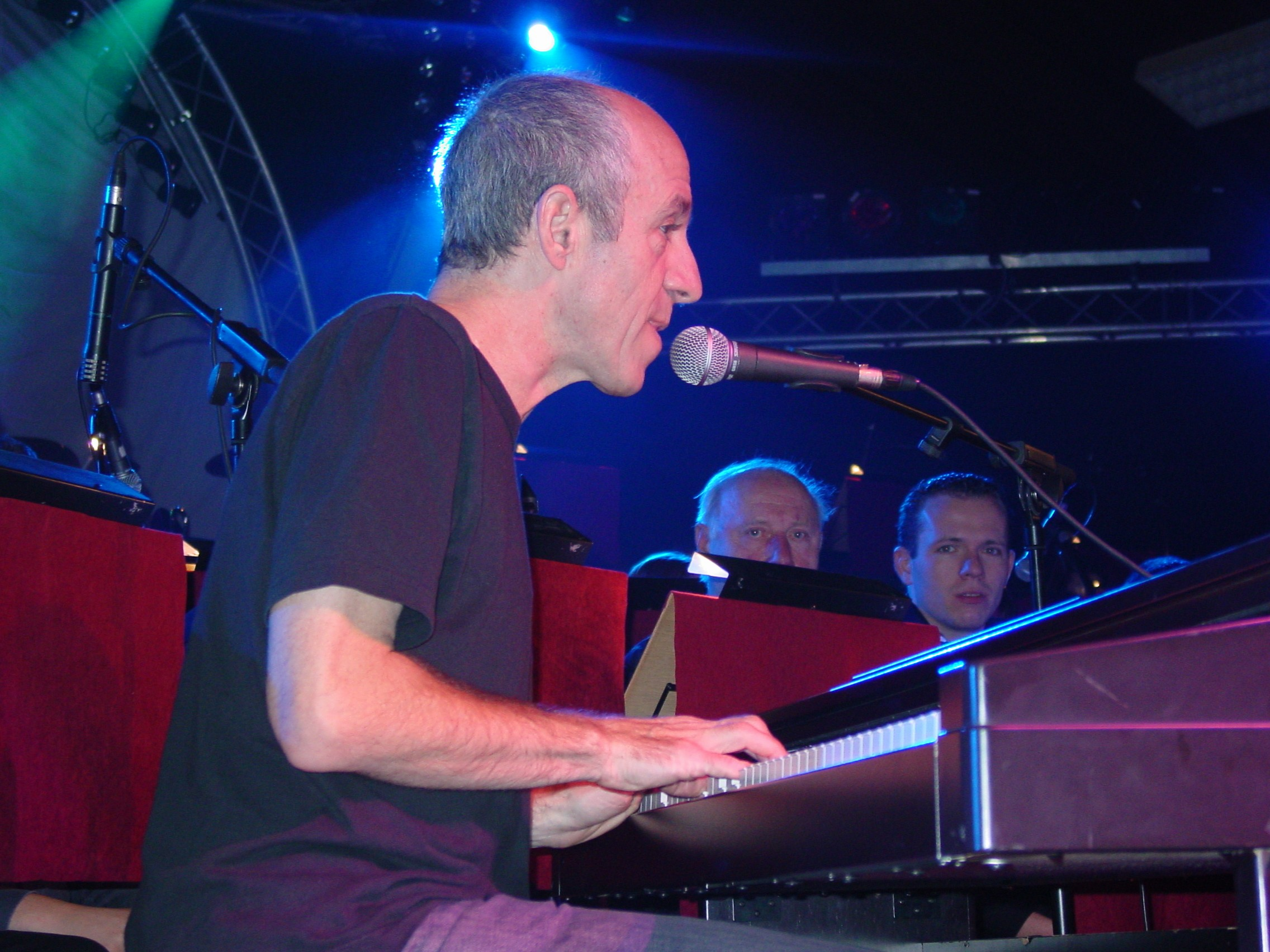
- Raymond van het Groenewoud was twice the main guest (1999 and 2010)
- Genre: Alternative rock, rock, indie rock, pop, hip hop, levenslied, folk rock
- Locations: Antwerp, Belgium
- Years active: 1969–2018, 2022–present
- Capacity: 20.000 (Sportpaleis); 8.000 (Lotto Arena) from 2023
- Organiser: Nekka vzw
- Website: nekka.be

Nekka-Nacht (Eng. Nekka-Night) is an annual event organized in Antwerp, Belgium. Traditionally, it celebrates the career of a Dutch-language artist from Flanders or the Netherlands.

== History ==
The first edition dates from 1969. Until 1970, the event was called Kazuno. From 1971 it was organized as Nekka. Back then, other-language artists also performed, and it was rather known as a folk-festival. The first Nekka-Nacht editions in 1994 and 1995 didn't have one specific main guest yet. Since 1996, different artists perform the songs of one main singer or band.

In 2013, a compilation album 20 Jaar Nekka Nacht was released.

== Central guests ==
- 1996: Boudewijn de Groot
- 1997: Johan Verminnen
- 1998: Rob de Nijs
- 1999: Raymond van het Groenewoud
- 2000: Will Tura
- 2001: Stef Bos
- 2002: De Nieuwe Snaar
- 2003: De Kreuners and Frank Boeijen in a second edition
- 2004: Kommil Foo
- 2005: Herman van Veen
- 2006: Kadril
- 2007: Boudewijn de Groot
- 2008: Bart Peeters
- 2009: Zjef Vanuytsel and Yevgueni
- 2010: Raymond van het Groenewoud
- 2011: Thé Lau and The Scene
- 2012: Willem Vermandere
- 2013: 20th anniversary edition with young artists performing a song with one of the previous central guests.
- 2014: De Nieuwe Snaar
- 2015: Buurman
- 2016: "Flanders honors Toon Hermans"
- 2017: No edition due to withdrawal of main sponsor
- 2018: No central guest, performances of different artists
- 2019-2022: No editions
- 2023: Mama's Jasje
