= Zjef Vanuytsel =

Belgian singer and guitarist

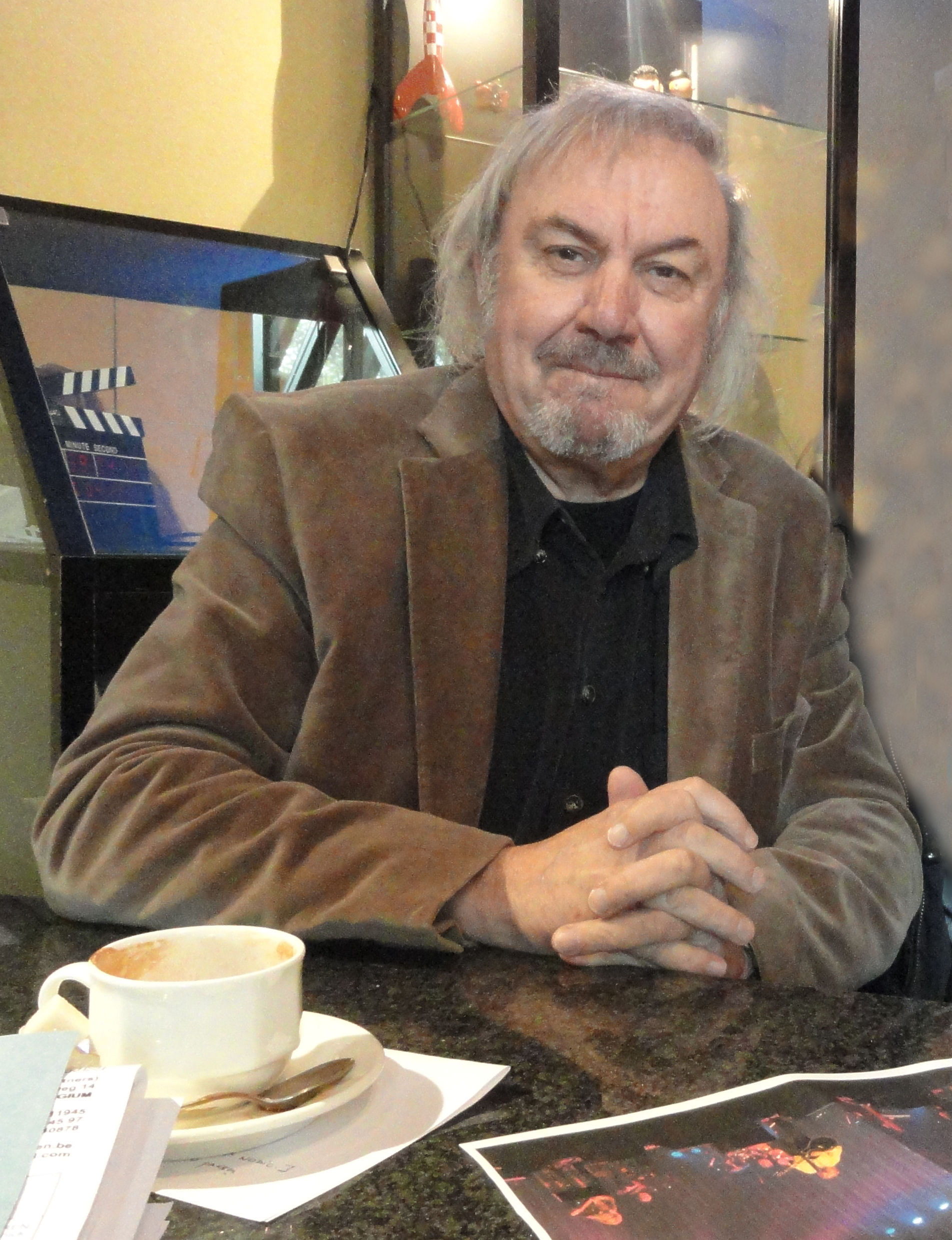
Zjef Vanuytsel

Jozef Guillaume Dymphna "Zjef" Vanuytsel (July 6, 1945 – December 30, 2015) was a Belgian folk music/kleinkunst singer and guitarist. He is seen as one of the Big Three of Flemish kleinkunst, along with Wannes Van de Velde and Willem Vermandere. Vanuytsel is most famous for his debut album, "De Zotte Morgen" ("The Mad Morning"), which became a bestseller and sold more than 100.000 copies. The title track "De Zotte Morgen" and the single "Houten Kop" ("Hangover", literally "Wooden Head") from the same album are his most well known songs. Apart from being a musician Vanuytsel was also an architect.

== Biography ==
Vanuytsel was born in Mol, Belgium. He began composing and singing while he studied at his high school in Hoogstraten and continued doing so when he studied architecture at the St. Lucas Institute in Brussels. He changed his first name into his artist's name "Zjef", inspired by the then popular progressive spelling in the Dutch-speaking countries. In 1970 he debuted with the album "De Zotte Morgen", which sold more than 100.000 copies in Flanders and the Netherlands. Several songs from this album, including "De Zotte Morgen", "Houten Kop", "Hop Marlène" ("Come on, Marlène") and "Ik Weet Wel, Mijn Lief" ("I Do Know, My Love") are still classics in Dutch language music. Vanuytsel combined a knack for melody and poetic lyrics with traditional folk music and pop music influences. Recurring themes are melancholy about things that pass by, doubt, but also warmth, compassion and comfort. He was influenced by Boudewijn de Groot, Jacques Brel and Bob Dylan and wrote from an autobiographical standpoint. The song "Stil in de Kempen" ("Silence in de Kempen") was written as a tribute to the death of his parents. Throughout the 1970s Vanuytsel released three albums, "Er is geen weg terug" (1973) ("There is no way back") (1973), "De Zanger" ("The Singer") (1976) and "De Stilte van het Land" (1978) ("The Silence of the Country"), which all sold relatively well. Many songs from these albums are still regarded as classics today, such as "De massa" ("The masses"), "Tussen Antwerpen en Rotterdam" ("Between Antwerp and Rotterdam") and "Laat alleen mijn goede vrienden over" ("Only leave me with my good friends").

In the 1980s Vanuytsel's popularity waned. "Tederheid" ("Tenderness") (1983) became his final record for a long time and he concentrated back on his job as an architect. Among other buildings he designed the city halls of Huldenberg and Bertem and worked on the Nero café in Hoeilaart, the cultural center Den Egger in Scherpenheuvel and the civil center De Markten in Brussels. In interviews he claimed he felt overworked and wanted to concentrate more on his family.

In 2007 Vanuytsel released a new album, "Ouwe Makkers" ("Old Buddies") (2007), and the following year he began touring again in Flanders. He was the main act during the Nekka-Nacht in the Sportpaleis in Antwerp. He also gave one concert in Goirle in the Netherlands. Ill health troubled him often. Near the end of 2008 he had cancel a tour because of an operation. In 2014 Vanuytsel began touring again, but cancer problems cancelled this event permanently.

He died in Leuven, Belgium on December 30, 2015, from cancer.

== Albums ==
- De zotte morgen (Philips, 1970 - LP)
- Er is geen weg terug (Philips, 1973 - LP)
- De zanger (Philips, 1976 - LP)
- De stilte van het land (Philips, 1978 - LP)
- Tederheid (Philips, 1983 - LP)
- Ouwe makkers (Universal, 2007 - CD)
- Integraal (Universal, 2014 - 7 Cd-box)
