= Sensualité =

Single by Axelle Red

from the album Sans plus attendre
- B-side: "Femme au volant"
- Released: 10 October 1993
- Recorded: 1993
- Genre: Pop
- Length: 3:48
- Label: Virgin
- Songwriters: Albert Hammond, Shelly Peiken, Axelle Red
- Producer: Wouter Van Belle

Axelle Red singles chronology
"Aretha et Moi" (1992)	"Sensualité" (1993)	"Elle danse seule" (1994)

Audio sample
- A 22 seconds sample from "Sensualité" where Red is singing the first refrain.: file; help

"Sensualité" is a song recorded by Belgian singer-songwriter Axelle Red. It is the third single from her debut album, Sans plus attendre, released on 10 October 1993. In 1994, the song was very successful in France and is generally considered to be Axelle Red's signature song. It was also the first single of the singer released under her pseudonym of Axelle Red.

== Background, lyrics and performances ==
Lyrics were written and the music composed by Albert Hammond, Shelly Peiken and Axelle Red. This pop song deals with a love relationship in which the physical aspect is important. During an interview in the French programme La Méthode Cauet, Axelle Red explained that the song originally should have been named "Sexualité" ("Sexuality" in English), but this title was cancelled as it could have been perceived too provocative.

The song is the fourth track on the studio album Sans plus attendre. It also features on Axelle Red's albums French Soul as first track, and on Alive, as first track too. It is also available on many French and Belgian compilations, such as Bleu Blanc Tubes vol. 1, De Pré Historie 1993, Bel 90 - Het beste uit de Belpop van 1993 and 100 op 1 - De beste Belgen.

== Chart performance ==
In France, "Sensualité" debuted at number 27 on the SNEP Singles Chart on 22 January 1994, then entered the top ten three weeks later, peaked at number two for six consecutive weeks, being unable to dislodge IAM's "Je danse le Mia" which topped the chart then, and spent 19 weeks in the top ten and 38 weeks in the top 50. It was certified gold by the Syndicat National de l'Édition Phonographique, and ranked at number four on the 1994 year-end chart.

== Track listings ==
- CD single
1. "Sensualité" — 3:48
2. "Femme au volant" — 3:41
- 7" single
1. "Sensualité" — 3:48
2. "Femme au volant" — 3:41
- Cassette
1. "Sensualité" — 3:48
2. "Femme au volant" — 3:41

== Charts ==
=== Weekly charts ===
Weekly chart performance for "Sensualité"
Chart (1993–1994)	Peak position
Belgium (Ultratop 50 Flanders)	6
France (SNEP)	2
Quebec (ADISQ)	4

=== Year-end charts ===
Year-end chart performance for "Sensualité"
Chart (1994)	Position
Europe (Eurochart Hot 100 Singles)	100
France (SNEP)	4

== Certifications ==
Certifications for "Sensualité"
Region	Certification	Certified units/sales
France (SNEP)	Gold	250,000^{*}
^{*} Sales figures based on certification alone.
