= Stash (band) =

Belgian band

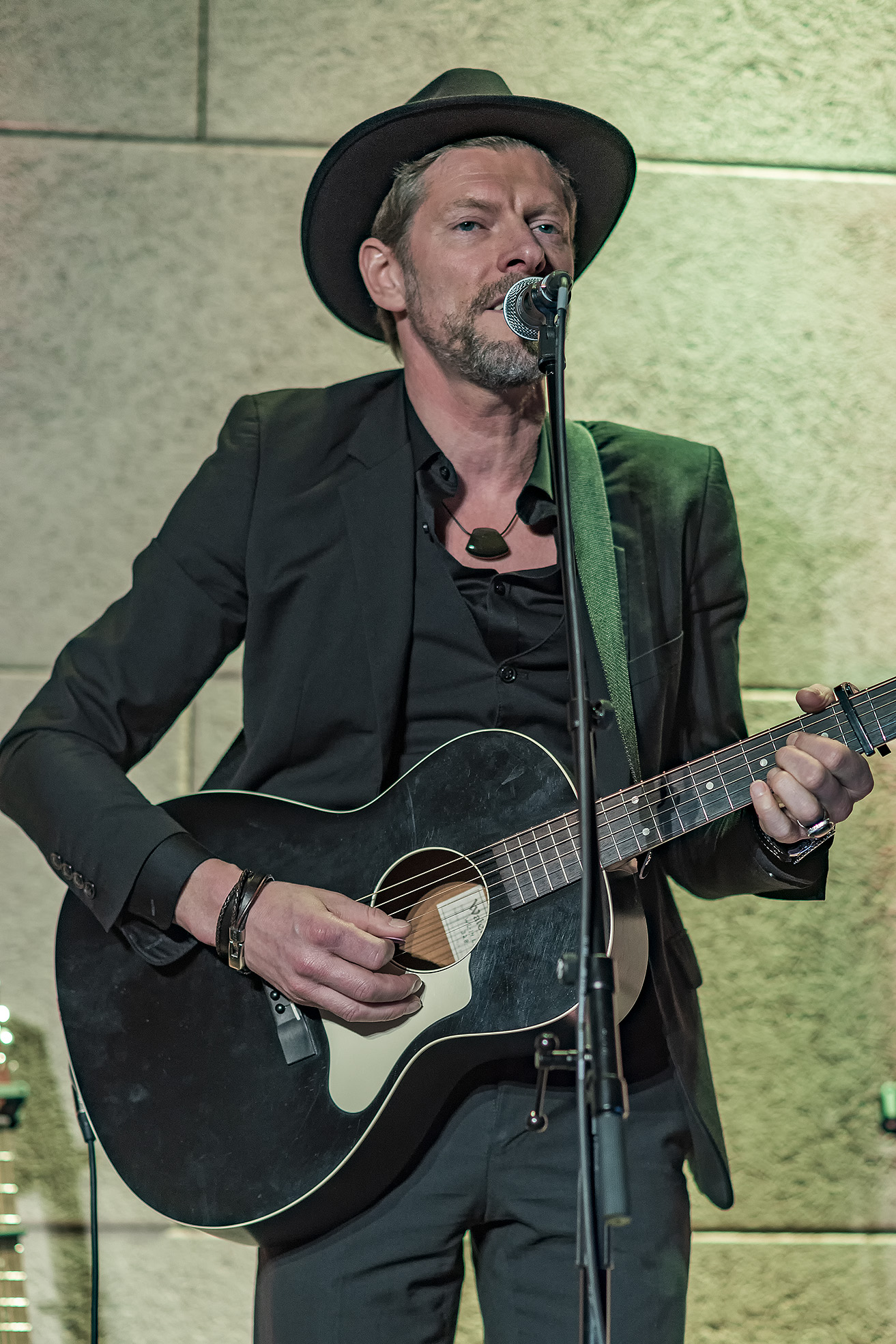

Background information
- Origin: Belgium
- Years active: 1997
- Members: Gunther Verspecht; Mathias Moors; David Vertongen; Philip Bruffaerts
- Website: www.stash.be

Stash (formerly Stache) is a Belgian music band that out of almost nowhere scored a monster hit in Flanders with the title "Sadness" in 2004–2005.

The hit single broke the records of the hit list of the VRT, the Ultratop by being both the longest present track in the top 10 as well as the longest present track in the entire Ultratop 75. In the videoclip "Sadness", several famous Flemish musical artists appear, like Axl Peleman, Guy Swinnen, Luc De Vos and Walter Grootaers - the official "international" clip does not have any of these cameos. In the clip of "Shelter from Evil Ones", the mothers of the four band members play music as well.

In the summer of 2011, they could be seen at Rock Werchter and Marktrock, among others. The front man of Stash is Gunther Verspecht.

== Discography ==
=== Singles ===
- "Sadness"
- "Shelter from Evil Ones"
- "Carving the Pain"
- "I Need a Woman", a duet with Sam Bettens
- "All That's Left"
- "Fading Out"
- "Empty Your Gun"

Single(s) with hits in the Flemish Ultratop 50	Date of appearance	Date of entrance	Highest position	Number of weeks	Remarks
"Sadness"	2004	30-10-2004	2	33	
"Shelter from Evil Ones"	2005	14-05-2005	tip5	–	
"Carving the Pain"	2005	27-08-2005	tip9	–	
"I Need a Woman"	2006	04-02-2006	11	12	Duet with Sarah Bettens
"All That's Left" / "Advertising Space"	2007	17-11-2007	25	16	
"Fading Out"	2008	16-02-2008	tip7	–	
"Empty Your Gun"	2013	20-07-2013	tip96	–	

=== Albums ===
- Grow Up to Be Just Like You (2001) (recorded as Stache)
- Thee Without Sin, Throw the First Stone (2002) (recorded as Stache)
- Rock 'n Roll Show (2005)
- Blue Lanes (2007)
- All That Fire! (2009)
- Wolfman! (2019)

Album(s) with hits in the Flemish Ultratop 50	Date of appearance	Date of entrance	Highest position	Number of weeks	Remarks
Rock 'n Roll Show	2005	23-04-2005	1	29	
Blue Lanes	2007	10-11-2007	24	21	
