= Another Lonely Soul =

Studio album by Novastar
- Released: 5 March 2004
- Recorded: BSB Studio, Brussels
- Genre: Soft rock
- Length: 42:47
- Labels: WEA; Virgin
- Producer: Piet Goddaer

Novastar chronology
Novastar (2000)	Another Lonely Soul (2004)	Almost Bangor (2008)

Alternative cover
- European EMI release cover

Another Lonely Soul is the second album of the Belgian band Novastar, released in 2004 by WEA. The album stayed at #1 of the Flemish Ultratop album chart for six weeks and was awarded a platinum record and the TMF Award for best album. The songs "Never Back Down", "When the Light Go Down on the Broken Hearted" and "Rome" were released as singles.

In 2006, Virgin Records released the album in all European countries. For this release, the album was remixed and supplemented with the song "Wrong", a single from the previous album Novastar, which preceded the other songs.

== Background ==
Singer and pianist Joost Zweegers intended to record the album in the United States, but unhappy with the way he was pushed to produce hits, he returned to Belgium. He started a collaboration with the Belgian musician Piet Goddaer (Ozark Henry) and together they wrote the songs for Another Loney Soul. Piet Goddear also produced the album, and sings or plays instruments on several songs.

Another Lonely Soul has no straightforward hits, like the debut album Novastar, but is more coherent. Joost Zweegers described Another Loney Soul as "more emotional and less suited for the radio" In another interview, he tells that "Another Lonely Soul was intended to be different from the debut, which was too poppy".

== Track listing ==
- All songs by Piet Goddaer and Joost Zweegers, except "Don't Ever Let It Get You Down" by Goddaer, Jonnie Most and Zweegers.
1. "Lend Me Love" – 4:53
2. "Never Back Down" – 4:18
3. "Rome" – 4:08
4. "Faith" – 5:02
5. "When the Lights Go Down on the Broken Hearted" – 4:39
6. "Lost Out over You" – 4:39
7. "Ask for the Moon" – 4:30
8. "This is a Road to Nowhere" – 2:47
9. "Don't Ever Let It Get You Down" – 4:24
10. "Still Learning to Fly" – 4:11

== Charts ==
=== Weekly charts ===
Chart (2004–2006)	Peak position
Belgian Albums (Ultratop Flanders)	1
Belgian Albums (Ultratop Wallonia)	56
Dutch Albums (Album Top 100)	36
Italian Albums (FIMI)	60

=== Year-end charts ===
Chart (2004)	Position
Belgian Albums (Ultratop Flanders)	3
