= Con solo pensarlo =

Con Solo Pensarlo

Studio album by Axelle Red
- Released: 1998
- Genre: Pop
- Producer: Wouter Van Belle and Axelle Red

Axelle Red chronology
À Tâtons (1996)	Con Solo Pensarlo (1998)	Toujours Moi (1999)

Con Solo Pensarlo is a 1998 album by the Belgian singer Axelle Red. The albums contains Spanish versions of French songs that appeared on Axelle Red's two previous albums, Sans Plus Attendre and À Tâtons.

The songs from Con Solo Pensarlo that were released as single, are "A Tientas", "Con Amor O No", "Dejame Ser Mujer" and "Sensualidad".

== Track listing ==
1. "Sensualidad" (originally "Sensualité")
2. "A tientas" ("A Tâtons")
3. "Con sólo pensarlo" ("Rien que d'y penser")
4. "Era" ("C'était")
5. "Mi oración" ("Ma Prière")
6. "Te esperé" ("Je t'attends)
7. "Tan infantil" ("Pas si naïf")
8. "Mi café" ("Mon Café)
9. "Con amor o no" ("Amoureuse ou pas")
10. "Déjame ser mujer" ("Rester Femme")
11. "No sufras por mí" ("T'en fais pas pour moi")
12. "El mundo gira mal" ("Le Monde tourne mal")
13. "Sirve de que" ("À quoi ça sert")

== Charts ==
Chart (1998)	Peak position
Belgian (Flanders) Albums Chart	1
Belgian (Wallonia) Albums Chart	5

End of the year chart (1998)	Position
Belgian (Flanders) Albums Chart	17
Belgian (Wallonia) Albums Chart	62

== Certifications ==
Region	Certification	Certified units/sales
Belgium (BEA)	Platinum	30,000^{*}
^{*} Sales figures based on certification alone.
