= Novastar =

Belgian rock band

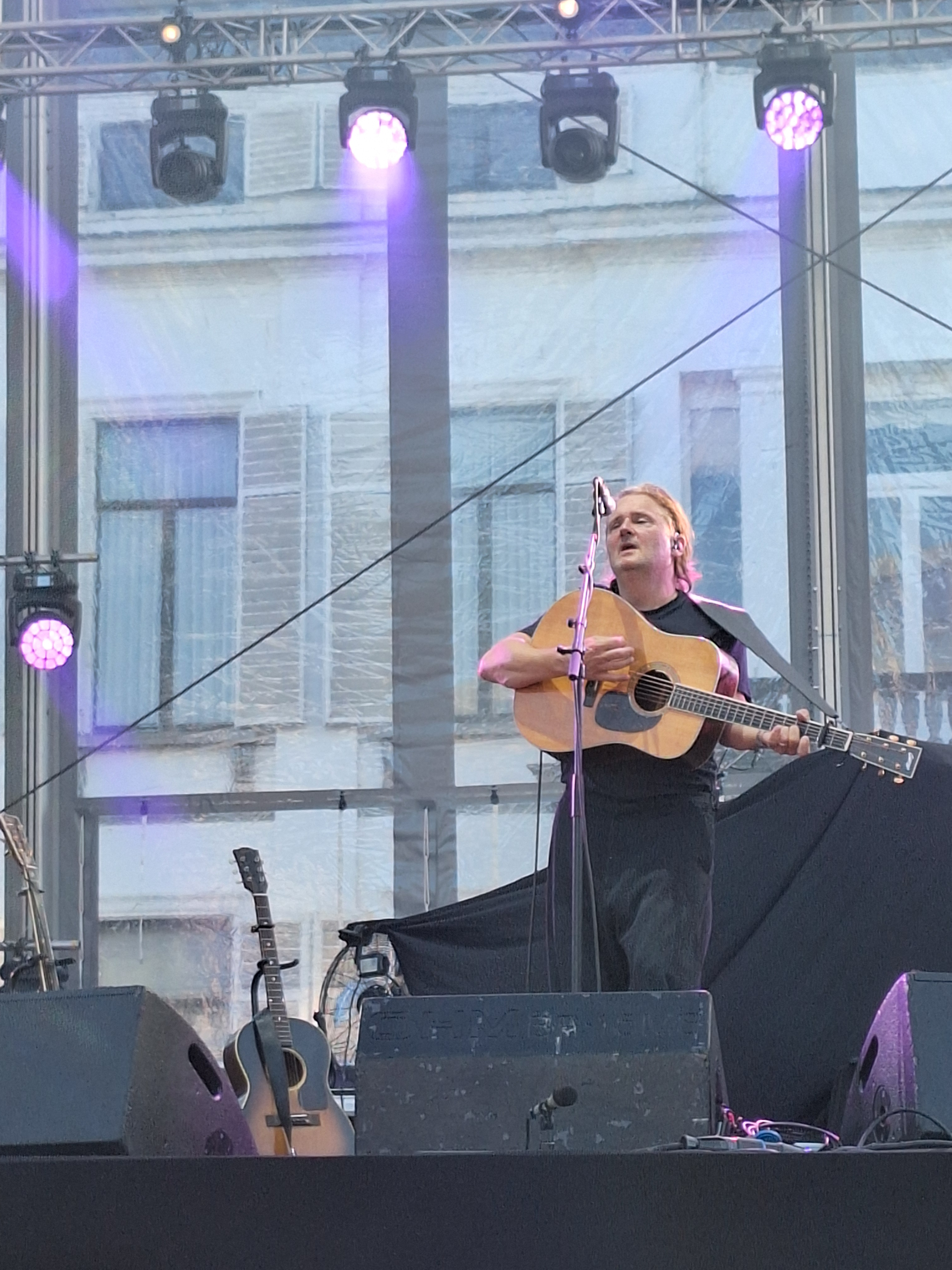
- Novastar performing in 2025

Background information
- Origin: Belgium
- Genres: Pop rock; alternative rock; indie pop
- Years active: 1996–present
- Labels: WEA; Virgin; Capitol
- Members: Joost Zweegers; Lars van Bambost; Jang Coenen; Karel De Backer; Cathy-Ann van Volsem
- Website: novastar-music.com

Joost Zweegers
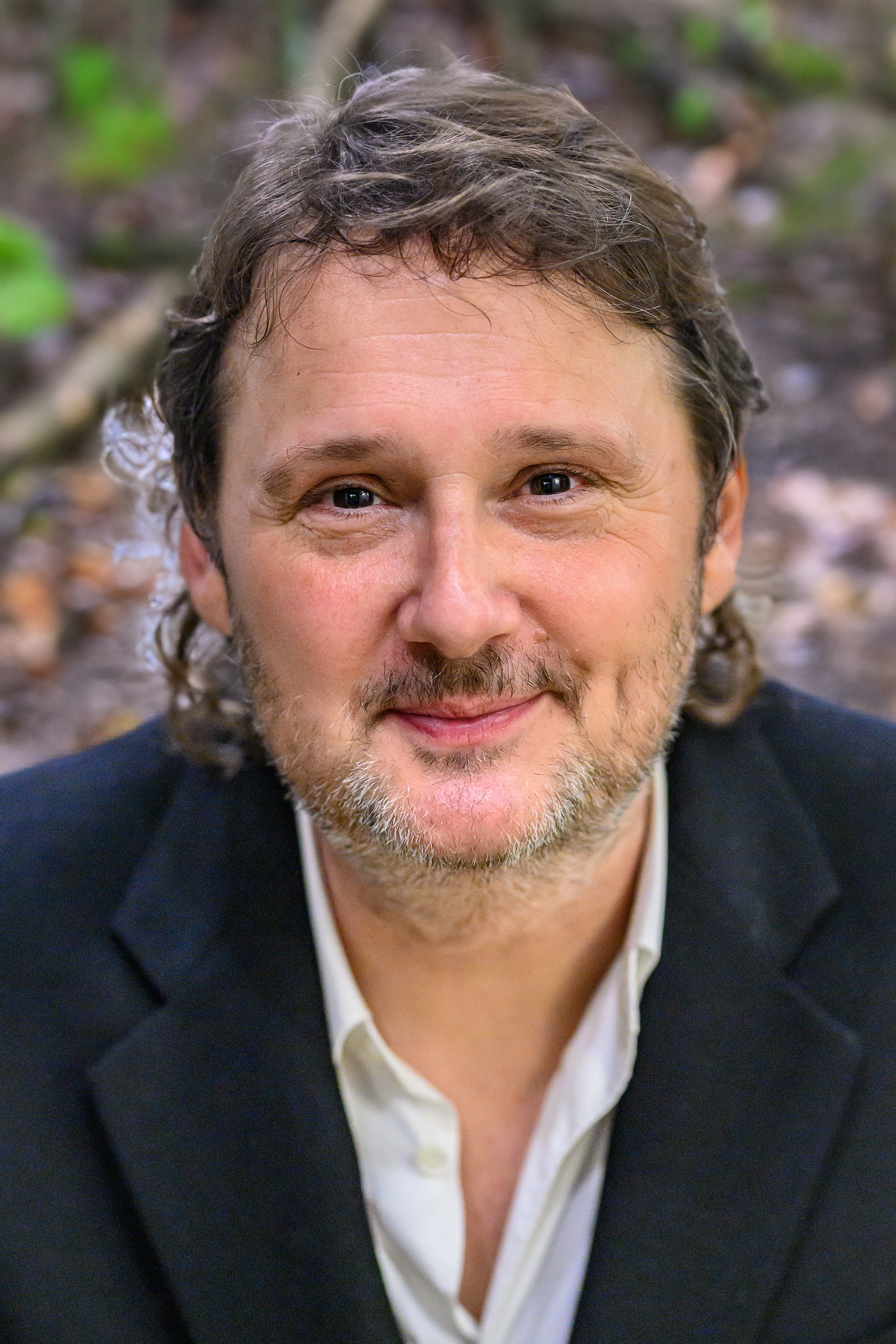
- Zweegers in 2023

Background information
- Born: 1 April 1971 (age 54); Sittard, Netherlands
- Genres: Pop rock; alternative rock; indie pop
- Occupation: Musician
- Instruments: Vocals; piano; guitar
- Years active: 1992–present
- Labels: WEA; Virgin; Capitol
- Website: novastar-music.com

Novastar is a Belgian rock band led by Dutch-born singer-songwriter and guitarist/pianist Joost Zweegers. They are known for their emotional ballads, and the high pitch of Zweegers's voice. Zweegers has also released solo material under the name Novastar.

== History ==
=== Novastar ===
Novastar was the winner of Humo's Rock Rally in 1996. Their self-titled debut album Novastar was not released until four years later, in 2000, but with success. The album, produced by Wouter Van Belle and Marc Bonne, was released by Warner Music, reached #1 on the Ultratop Chart in Flanders, and won the band a platinum record. The singles "Wrong", "The Best Is Yet to Come", "Caramia", and "Lost and Blown Away" received much airplay. Novastar was honored as best album at both the Zamu Music Awards and the TMF Awards. Neil Young heard Novastar's music and was impressed. He invited Joost and his band to open up for his Neil Young & Crazy Horse live show on several European tour dates.

=== Another Lonely Soul ===
Joost Zweegers intended to record his second album in the United States, but unhappy with the way he was pushed to produce hits, he returned to Belgium. He started a collaboration with the Belgian musician Ozark Henry and together they wrote the songs for the next Novastar album, Another Lonely Soul. The album, which Henry also produced, was released in 2004.

Although Zweegers described Another Lonely Soul as "more emotional and less suited for the radio", the album was an immediate success. Just as the debut album, the new record topped the Ultratop album chart and was awarded a platinum record and the TMF Award for best album. Zweegers also received the Zamu Music Award as Best Singer.

The singles "Never Back Down", "When the Lights Go Down on the Broken Hearted", and 'Rome" got a lot of airplay in Belgium and the Netherlands. The band gained popularity in other parts of Europe as well, with "Never Back Down" receiving major airplay in Italy, Spain, and Portugal. Novastar toured through Belgium and the Netherlands in clubs as well as festivals such as Pinkpop, Rock Werchter, Dour, and Lowlands.

In 2005, Novastar signed with the EMI record label, which released Another Lonely Soul (supplemented with the debut-album single "Wrong") in all European countries.

=== Almost Bangor ===
In the last months of 2007, Zweegers took his old keyboard player Jeroen Swinnen along to Bangor, a small picturesque village near the coast of Brittany, France, to write songs. Back home, he called Wim De Wilde, a well-known Belgian soundtrack composer, to ask him to produce a new Novastar album. They worked together with Kevin Killen (known for his work with Elvis Costello, Peter Gabriel, U2, Bryan Ferry, and Kate Bush), percussionist Luis Jardim (The Rolling Stones, Paul McCartney, Bowie, Björk, Grace Jones), bassist Laurent Vernerey, pianist Claude Salmieri, and many others.

The resulting record, Almost Bangor, combines a variety of different genres. It received platinum sales status in Belgium and golden status in the Netherlands. Both singles "Mars Needs Woman" and "Because" reached the top of the airplay charts in both countries. Novastar received a prestigious 3FM Award for Best Alternative Artist in the Netherlands. After a sold-out club tour in the Fall of 2008, the band performed in February at the fully packed Lotto Arena in Antwerp and Amsterdam's Heineken Music Hall. In between, the band performed at the biggest festivals in the Netherlands and Belgium as well, including Pinkpop, Cactus Festival, Dranouter, and Bospop.

=== Inside Outside ===
Joost Zweegers spent four years creating the next album, titled Inside Outside, which was released by Warner Music in Belgium and The Netherlands on 28 March 2014. It was influenced by many musicians including Richard Ashcroft (The Verve), Pink Floyd, George Harrison, Paul Weller, and Fleetwood Mac. Zweegers worked with songwriters Dean Dyson, Andy Burrows, and James Walsh.

The album was produced and mixed by John Leckie (The Stone Roses, Radiohead, The Verve, Los Lobos, Muse, My Morning Jacket, Pink Floyd, Harrison). Zweegers travelled to the UK for six months to record in several studios, including Rockfield Studio, Doghouse Studio, and Rak Studios. Musicians that were involved in the recordings included Clive Deamer (Portishead, Roni Size), Charlie Jones (Robert Plant, Goldfrapp), Mikey Rowe (David Gilmour, Noel Gallagher's High Flying Birds), Skin Tyson (Cast, The Strange Sensation), and Steve Berlin.

After its release, the album hit the Belgian album charts at #1 the first day Novastar followed this with a sold-out tour of Belgium and The Netherlands in April and May 2014. The first single from the album, "Closer to You", topped the airplay charts in Belgium. The follow-up single, "Light Up My Life", was released at the end of June 2014 and also received a lot of airplay.

=== In the Cold Light of Monday ===
In 2018, Novastar released their fifth studio album, titled In the Cold Light of Monday.

=== Holler and Shout ===
In 2021, Novastar released their sixth studio album, Holler and Shout.

== Band members ==
- Joost Zweegers – guitar, piano, vocals
- Lars van Bambost – guitar
- Jang Coenen – bass
- Karel De Backer – drums
- Cathy-Ann van Volsem – drums

== Discography ==
=== Albums ===
Year	Album	Peak positions			Certification
Year	Album	BEL (Fl)	BEL (Wa)	NED	Certification
2000	Novastar	1	–	66	BEL: Platinum
2004	Another Lonely Soul	1	56	36	BEL: Platinum
2008	Almost Bangor	2	78	7	BEL: Gold
2014	Inside Outside	1	67	8	
2018	In the Cold Light of Monday	2	–	21	
2021	Holler and Shout	8	–	47	
2024	The Best Is Yet to Come	1	–	42	

=== Singles ===
Year	Single	Peak positions					Album
Year	Single	BEL (Fl) Ultratop	BEL (Fl) Ultratip	BEL (Wa) Ultratip	NED Dutch Top 40	NED Single Top 100	Album
1999	"Wrong"	43		–		47	Novastar
2000	"The Best Is Yet to Come"	–	3	–	–	–	Novastar
2000	"Caramia"	–		–	–	–	Novastar
2000	"Lost & Blown Away"	45		–	–	92	Novastar
2004	"Never Back Down"	28		–	–	84	Another Lonely Soul
2004	"When the Lights Go Down on the Broken Hearted"	–	16	–	–	43	Another Lonely Soul
2004	"Rome"	–		–	–	–	Another Lonely Soul
2008	"Mars Needs Woman"	13		–	–	63	Almost Bangor
2008	"Because"	14		4	24	20	Almost Bangor
2008	"Waiting So Long"	–	–	–	21	5	Almost Bangor
2009	"Tunnelvision"	–	21	–	–	–	Almost Bangor
2014	"Closer to You"	–	1	37	–	–	Inside Outside
2014	"Light Up My Life"	–	15	–	–	–	Inside Outside
2018	"Home Is Not Home"	–	2	–	–	–	In the Cold Light of Monday
2018	"Holly"	–	5	–	–	–	In the Cold Light of Monday
2018	"Cruel Heart"	–	2	–	–	–	In the Cold Light of Monday
2019	"Word's Out"	–	31	–	–	–	In the Cold Light of Monday
2019	"Life Is All"	–	43	–	–	–	In the Cold Light of Monday
2020	"We Don't Mind"	–	30	–	–	–	In the Cold Light of Monday
2021	"Velvet Blue Sky"	43	–	–	–	–	Holler and Shout
2022	"Your World"	50	–	–	–	–	Holler and Shout

=== DVDs ===
Year	Album	Certification
2009	Almost Bangor - Live	

== Awards ==
- Best Alternative Artist – 3FM Awards (2009)
- Best Belgian Album for Novastar – TMF Awards
- Best Composer – ZAMU Awards
- Best Album for Novastar – ZAMU Awards
- Best Writer/Composer – Music Industry Award (MIA)
- Limburg Culture Award
