= Été 67 =

Belgian rock band

Été 67 (Summer of 67; the name is inspired by the 1967 Summer of Love) is a rock band created in 1998 in Esneux (near Liège), Belgium. They generally sing in French, but also do some covers in English (like I'm Waiting for the Man, Venus in Furs or Simple Twist of Fate, Soul of a Man) and Dutch. They musically sound between The Smiths and Jacques Dutronc, with a singer inspired by Bertrand Cantat of Noir Desir.

They are now one of the most popular live acts in French-speaking Belgium.

The Belgian label Team for action (distribution "Bang!") released on April 13, 2005 a first untitled EP including the song Le quartier de la gare which became quite popular on Belgian radios. Their first untitled LP was released on March 3, 2006, with a special 2 CDs edition released on March 27, 2007.

They signed with the French independent label Wagram Music, and released an eponymous EP and LP during summer 2007 with different track listings.

They record their second album during summer 2009 in Brussels and Paris.

== Members ==
- Nicolas Michaux - vocals, guitar
- Raphaël Breuer - guitar, singer
- Bryan Hayart - drums, percussion
- Nicolas Berwart - bass
- Renaud Magis - guitar, backing vocals
- Xavier Dellicour - saxophone, clarinet, flute, musical keyboard, harmonica

== Discography ==
Été 67 / Demos 2003
1. Le répondeur
2. Le p'tit diable
3. Les pilules
4. Terre inconnue (version 1)
5. Terre inconnue (version 2)
Été 67 / EP (Belgian release)

Released on April 13, 2005

1. Le quartier de la gare
2. Sens unique
3. Suite d'accords
4. Générique 67
Été 67 / LP (Belgian release)

Released on March 3, 2007

1. Les pilules
2. Dis-moi encore
3. Le quartier de la gare
4. Eva
5. Marcher droit
6. Tu n'es pas là
7. Si vous voulez de moi
8. Chinese restaurant
9. Le petit diable
10. Autodestruction massive
11. Je suis un égoïste
12. I'm waiting for the man (Back To Mono #2) -- Velvet Underground cover
13. Les vacances à la plage
Été 67 / LP - Special Edition (Belgian release)

Released on March 27, 2007

CD 1

1. Les pilules
2. Dis-moi encore
3. Le quartier de la gare
4. Eva
5. Marcher droit
6. Tu n'es pas là
7. Si vous voulez de moi
8. Chinese restaurant
9. Le petit diable
10. Autodestruction massive
11. Je suis un égoïste
12. I'm waiting for the man (Back To Mono #2) -- Velvet Underground cover
13. Les vacances à la plage
14. Tout ce que je veux
15. On nous cache tout, on nous dit rien -- Jacques Dutronc cover
16. Dis moi encore (#2)
17. Souvenirs
18. Voir un ami pleurer \ Een vriend zien huilen -- Jacques Brel cover, duet with Franck vander Linden (from De Mens; studio recording from the 0110 live act)

CD 2 (DVD Bonus)

1. Dis-moi encore (video)
2. Dis-moi encore (making of)
3. Les vacances à la plage (vidéo)
Été 67 / Le quartier de la gare (French release)

Released on June 18, 2007

1. Le quartier de la gare
2. Les pilules
3. Autodestruction massive
4. Générique 67
Été 67 / LP (French release)

Released on August 27, 2007

1. Les pilules
2. Dis-moi encore
3. Le quartier de la gare
4. Eva
5. Marcher droit
6. Tu n'es pas là
7. Tout ce que je veux
8. Si vous voulez de moi
9. Chinese restaurant
10. Le petit diable
11. Autodestruction massive
12. Je suis un égoïste
13. On nous cache tout, on nous dit rien -- Jacques Dutronc cover
14. Les vacances à la plage
Été 67 / Passer la frontière

Released on March 27, 2010

1. Passer la frontière
2. Plus tôt que prévu
3. Hôtel Delirium # 9
4. Dans ma prison
5. Une vie saine (duet with Antoine Wielemans (Girls in Hawaii)
6. Crime passionnel
7. Quelque chose à part
8. Drogue douce
9. Loin d'ici
10. Le cow-boy tout nu
11. Romans de gare
12. Le pourboire
13. Sans rêves
14. Retour à Élisabethville
