= Jardin secret =

Jardin Secret

Studio album by Axelle Red
- Released: October 2, 2006
- Recorded: Willie Mitchell's royal studio's, Memphis
- Genre: Pop
- Producer: Axelle Red and Daan Stuyven

Axelle Red chronology
French Soul (2004)	''Jardin Secret'' (2006)

Jardin secret is the sixth studio album by Belgian singer Axelle Red. It was released in October 2006.

"Temps pour Nous" was the first single released from the Jardin Secret.

== Track listing ==
1. "Temps pour nous" — 3:16
2. "Changer ma vie" — 3:17
3. "Perles de pluie" — 4:02
4. "Jure!" — 2:47
5. "Pas compliquer" — 3:28
6. "Si tu savais (Janelle)" — 3:42
7. "Papillon" — 4:34
8. "Utopie" — 4:43
9. "Romantique à mort" — 3:23
10. "Ce dont le monde a besoin" — 3:30
11. "Naïve" — 3:16
12. "Jardin secret" — 4:18
13. "Fruit défendu" — 1:33

== Charts ==
Chart (2006–2007)	Peak position
Belgian (Flanders) Albums Chart	1
Belgian (Wallonia) Albums Chart	2
French Albums Chart	6
Swiss Albums Chart	44

End of the year chart (2006)	Position
Belgian (Flanders) Albums Chart	5
Belgian (Wallonia) Albums Chart	44
French Albums Chart	152
End of the year chart (2007)	Position
Belgian (Flanders) Albums Chart	11
Belgian (Wallonia) Albums Chart	68

== Certifications ==
Region	Certification	Certified units/sales
Belgium (BRMA)	3× Platinum	90,000^{*}
France (SNEP)	Gold	75,000^{*}
^{*} Sales figures based on certification alone.
