= Kommil Foo =

Belgian cabaret duo

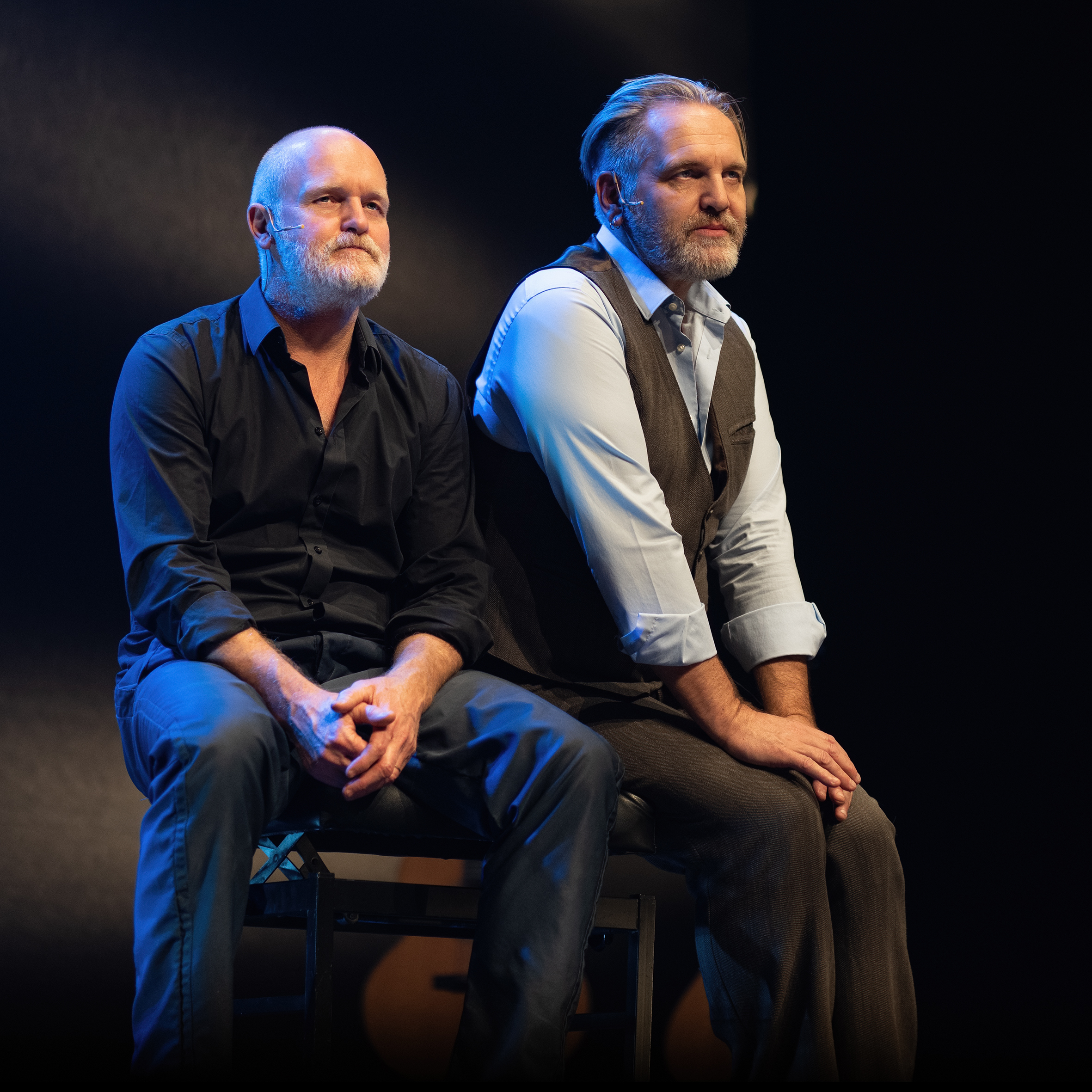
- Kommil Foo in 2022

Background information
- Origin: Antwerp, Belgium
- Genres: Folk music, spoken word
- Years active: 1987–present
- Labels: BMGy, Play It Again Sam, LC
- Members: Raf Walschaerts; Mich Walschaerts
- Website: https://www.kommilfoo.be/

Kommil Foo is a Flemish cabaret duo, existing of two brothers Raf (b. 2 October 1965) and Mich Walschaerts (b. 10 March 1969).

== Career ==
In 1987, the duo gave their first performance in a Ghent student club. They performed their first real show Ballade in 1988. Between 1988 and 1992, the brothers wrote three musical theatre programs.

In late 1992, the duo's fourth program Plank was awarded in Rotterdam. The jury spoke of a "perfect duo with a great future". Plank marked the duo's breakthrough and was performed over 250 times in Flanders and the Netherlands.

TV presenter Mark Uytterhoeven saw one of their shows, and invited them weekly in his television show Morgen Maandag in 1993. From then, the duo became known to the big audience in Flanders.

In 1998, they performed their anniversary show 10 years of Kommil Foo: the very best with an extended orchestra, and in 2002 the 15-year anniversary was celebrated at the Sportpaleis in Antwerp. In 2004, the duo was the central guest at Nekka-Nacht. Meanwhile, they continue to tour successfully in Flemish and Dutch theatres.

Both men also work separately on other cabaret, theatre, and children's theatre productions.

== Trivia ==
- The duo's name is phonetic Dutch for the French Comme il faut (Eng: As it must).
- The brothers seemed destined to form a cabaret duo. "Our dad has no embarrassment whatsoever and is made to be on a stage, while our mum writes beautiful poems" Raf said in a 2019 interview.
- The brothers claim they hardly ever argue. In their career that lasts decennia, they split up once, but reunited 3 hours later.

== Awards and honours ==
- Camerettenprijs (Netherlands): 1992
- CJP-podiumprijs (Netherlands): 1994
- Central guests at Nekka-Nacht (Belgium): 2004
- Poelifinario (Netherlands): 2005
- Dirk Witte prijs (Netherlands): 2015
- 1st place in the Radio 1 Low Countries-List (nl) (song Ruimtevaarder): 2018, 2019, 2020, 2022

== Programs ==
- Ballade (1988)
- Naakt op sokken (1990)
- J. van Gips (1992)
- Plank (1993)
- Akke-akke-tuut (Show for children, 1993)
- Neandertaal (1995)
- Bek! (1998)
- Andermans gelag (benefit for Amnesty International, 1998)
- 10 jaar Kommil Foo (1998)
- IJdele Hoop (2000)
- Lof der Waanzin (2002)
- Wolfijzers en Schietgeweren (2004)
- Spaak (2005)
- In Concert (2006)
- Wolf (2008)
- Kommil Foo DeLuxe: Het beste van Kommil Foo met Orquesta Tanguedia (2010)
- Breken (2012)
- Schoft (2016)
- Oogst (2019)
- Grind (2023)

== Discography ==
- Ballade (1988)
- Neandertaal (1995)
- Bek! (1998)
- Andermans gelag (1998)
- 10 jaar Kommil Foo (1998)
- IJdele Hoop (2000)
- Lof der Waanzin (2002)
- Het beste live (2003)
- Wolfijzers en Schietgeweren (2004)
- Spaak (2005)
- Wolf (2008)
- Kommil Foo DeLuxe (2010, met Orquesta Tanguedia)
- Breken (2012)
- Liefde zonder meer (2017)
- Oogst – 30 jaar Kommil Foo (2019)
