= À tâtons =

Studio album by Axelle Red
- Released: 1996
- Recorded: Caste Studios, Nashville
- Genre: Pop
- Length: 1:00:59
- Label: Virgin Records
- Producer: Wouter Van Belle and Axelle Red

Axelle Red chronology
Sans Plus Attendre (1993)	À tâtons (1996)	Con Solo Pensarlo (1998)

À tâtons is the second album by the Belgian singer Axelle Red. It was released in 1996.

Singles taken from À Tâtons were "Rien Que d'y Penser", "À Tâtons", "Rester Femme", "À Quoi Ca Sert" and "Ma Prière".

== Track listing ==
1. "À tâtons" (Axelle Red, Albert Hammond, Shelly Peiken) – 3:30
2. "C'était" (Red, Hammond, Peiken) – 4:07
3. "Mon café" (Red) – 4:37
4. "Ma prière" (Red) – 4:44
5. "Pas si naïf" (Red, Christophe Vervoort) – 3:42
6. "À quoi ça sert" (Red, Vervoort) – 3:36
7. "Papa dit" (Red, Patrick Deltenre, Vervoort) – 4:58
8. "Qui connaît la route" (Richard Seff, Red) – 3:30
9. "Rien que d'y penser" (Red, Hammond, Peiken) – 3:06
10. "T'en fais pas pour moi" (Red, S. Cropper, C. Marsh) – 5:10
11. "Rester femme" (Red) – 5:02
12. "Légère" (R. Seff, Red) – 3:55
13. "Un été pour rien" (R. Seff, Daniel Seff, Red) – 3:30
14. "À tâtons (reprise)" – 7:32

== Charts ==
Chart (1996–1998)	Peak position
Belgian (Flanders) Albums Chart	3
Belgian (Wallonia) Albums Chart	6
French Albums Chart	5

End of year chart (1997)	Position
Belgian (Flanders) Albums Chart	44
Belgian (Wallonia) Albums Chart	58
End of year chart (1998)	Position
Belgian (Flanders) Albums Chart	97
Belgian (Wallonia) Albums Chart	84
French Albums Chart	21

== Certifications ==
Region	Certification	Certified units/sales
Belgium (BRMA)	2× Platinum	60,000^{*}
France (SNEP)	Platinum	300,000^{*}
^{*} Sales figures based on certification alone.
