= Alive (in concert) =

Live album by Axelle Red
- Released: 2000
- Genre: Pop
- Label: Virgin Records

Axelle Red chronology
Toujours Moi (1999)	Alive (in concert) (2000)	Face A / Face B (2002)

Alive (in concert) is a live album by Belgian artist Axelle Red. It was released in 2000.

== Track listing ==
No.	Title	Length
1.	"Sensualité"	7:12
2.	"Ce Matin"	2:40
3.	"À Tâtons"	4:03
4.	"À quoi ça sert ?"	4:01
5.	"Elle danse seule"	4:44
6.	"Le Monde tourne mal"	8:29
7.	"Just the 2 of Us"	3:51
8.	"À 82 Ans"	3:09
9.	"Parce que c'est toi"	5:16
10.	"La Réponse"	4:39
11.	"Ma Prière"	6:33
12.	"Je t'attends"	4:22
13.	"Aretha et Moi"	6:29
14.	"Rester Femme"	3:38
15.	"J'ai jamais dit" (Radio Mix)	3:52

== Charts ==
Chart (2000–2001)	Peak position
Belgian (Flanders) Albums Chart	25
Belgian (Wallonia) Albums Chart	23
French Albums Chart	20
Swiss Albums Chart	96

== Certifications ==
Region	Certification	Certified units/sales
Belgium (BEA)	Platinum	30,000^{*}
France (SNEP)	Gold	100,000^{*}
^{*} Sales figures based on certification alone.
