= Face A / Face B =

Studio album by Axelle Red
- Released: 2002
- Genre: Pop
- Length: 64:02
- Label: Virgin Records
- Producer: Filip Vanes

Axelle Red chronology
Alive (in concert) (2000)	Face A / Face B (2002)	French Soul (2004)

Face A / Face B is a 2002 album by the Belgian singer Axelle Red.

The singles released from the album were "Je Me Fâche", "Venez Vers Moi", "Pas Maintenant", "Toujours" and "Gloria".

== Track listing ==
1. "Venez vers moi" (Axelle Red, Richard Seff) – 4:52
2. "Voilà tout ce qu'on peut faire" (Red, R. Seff) – 4:18
3. "Vole" (Red) – 5:17
4. "Blanche Neige" (Red) – 6:01
5. "Je me fâche" (Red) – 4:55
6. "Toujours" (Red, Daniel Seff) – 4:14
7. "Amants de minuits" (Red, Christophe Vervoort) – 4:26
8. "Disco grenouille" (Red) – 5:31
9. "Gloria" (Red, Vervoort) – 4:04
10. "Pas maintenant" (Red, D. Seff) – 3:39
11. "T'es ma maman" (Red, Vervoort) – 3:50
12. "Bon anniversaire" (Red, Vervoort) – 12:55

== Certifications ==
Country	Certification	Date	Sales certified	Physical sales
Belgium	Platinum		30,000	
France	2 x Gold	2003	200,000	110,000 in 2002

== Charts ==
Chart (2002)	Peak position
Belgian (Flanders) Albums Chart	4
Belgian (Wallonia) Albums Chart	4
French Albums Chart	13
Swiss Albums Chart	37

End of the year chart (2002)	Position
Belgian (Flanders) Albums Chart	47
Belgian (Wallonia) Albums Chart	60
French Albums Chart	105
End of the year chart (2003)	Position
Belgian (Flanders) Albums Chart	76
Belgian (Wallonia) Albums Chart	80
