= Wouter Deprez =

Flemish comedian and cabaretier

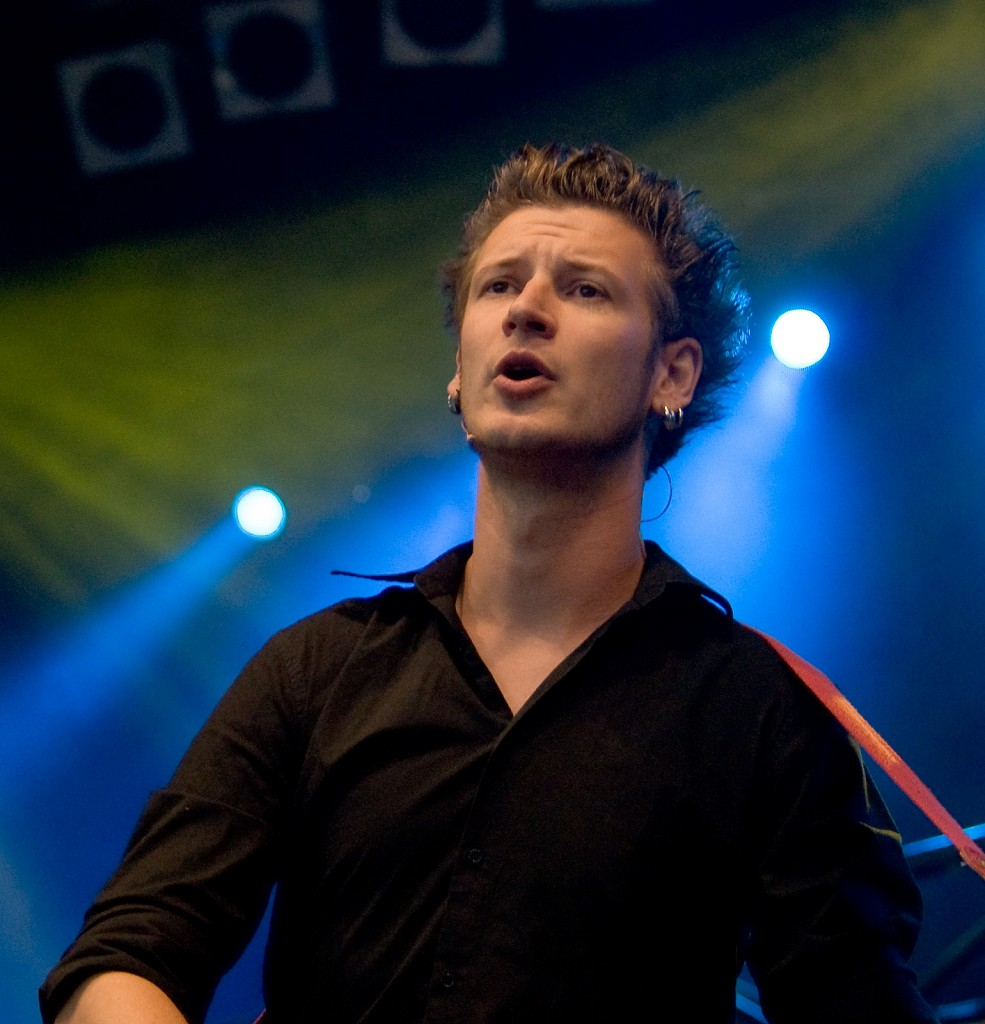
- Wouter Deprez, 0110 concert on 1 November 2006 in Gent, Belgium
- Born: 14 February 1975 (age 51); Geluwe, Belgium
- Website: www.wouterdeprez.be

Wouter Deprez (born 14 February 1975 in Geluwe) is a Flemish comedian and cabaretier. In 2003 he won Humo's Comedy Cup and in 2005 he won the TV quiz De Slimste Mens.

== Shows ==
- Schellekes (2001)
- Moest ik van u zijn (2002)
- Koning Keizer Kannibaal, together with Wannes Capelle and Helder Deploige (2004)
- War (2005)
- Eelt (2007)
- Je Zal Alles Worden (2009)

== Awards ==
- 2000 - Winner Humorologie
- 2002 - Finale of the Cameretten (cabaretfestival)|Camerettenfestival
- 2003 - Winner Humo’s Comedy Cup
- 2004 - Jury Award Amsterdams Kleinkunstfestival
