= Laura Lynn =

Belgian singer

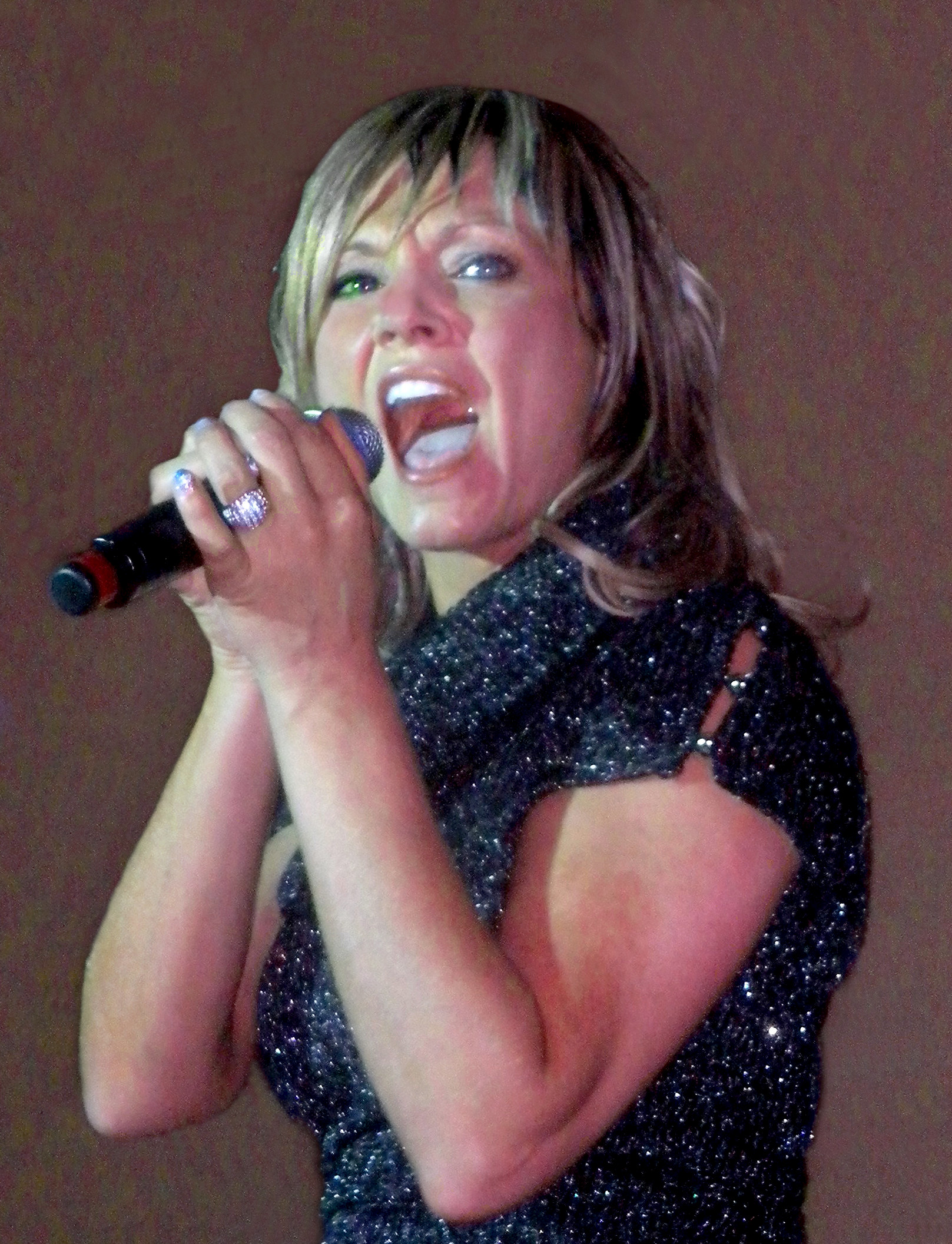

Background information
- Born: Sabrina Tack; 18 June 1976 (age 50)
- Genre: Schlager
- Occupation: Singer
- Years active: 2005–present
- Website: www.lauralynn.be

Laura Lynn (born 18 June 1976) is a Belgian singer, based in Flanders. Her real name is Sabrina Tack and she is known as the "Queen of Schlager". She mainly sings in Dutch, but has also recorded songs in Afrikaans and English.

She has had, as of 2008, four number-one songs on the Flanders Ultratop 50:

- "Jij bent de mooiste" in 2006
- "Kom Dans met Mij" in 2007, with Frans Bauer
- "Dans de hele nacht met mij", also in 2007
- "Al duurt de nacht tot morgenvroeg" in 2008, again with Bauer
