= Toujours moi =

Studio album by Axelle Red
- Released: 1999
- Recorded: ICP Studios, Brussels
- Genre: Pop
- Length: 50:07
- Label: Virgin Records
- Producer: Axelle Red

Axelle Red chronology
Con Solo Pensarlo (1998)	Toujours moi (1999)	Alive (2000)

Toujours moi is a 1999 album by the Belgian singer Axelle Red.

The singles released from this album were "Parce que c'est toi", "Bimbo à moi", "Faire des mamours", "Ce matin", "Toujours moi" and "J'ai jamais dit (que je serais ton amie)".

== Track listing ==
1. "Faire des mamours" (Axelle Red, Christophe Vervoort) – 7:42
2. "Mon futur proche" (Red, Vervoort) – 3:31
3. "Ce matin" (Red, Vervoort) – 2:35
4. "Parce que c'est toi" (Red, Daniel Seff) – 4:08
5. "À 82 ans" (Red, D. Seff) – 2:35
6. "La Réponse" (Red, Richard Seff) – 4:21
7. "Bimbo à moi" (Red, R. Seff) – 3:55
8. "Stay or not" (Red, Vervoort) – 8:42
9. "J'ai jamais dit (je serais ton amie)" (Red, D. Seff) – 3:53
10. "Quitter tôt" (Red, D. Seff) – 2:56
11. "Toujours moi" (Red, R. Seff) – 5:49

== Charts ==
Chart (1996–1998)	Peak position
Belgian (Flanders) Albums Chart	6
Belgian (Wallonia) Albums Chart	4
French Albums Chart	1
Swiss Albums Chart	66

End of year chart (1999)	Position
Belgian (Flanders) Albums Chart	52
Belgian (Wallonia) Albums Chart	29
French Albums Chart	30
End of year chart (2000)	Position
Belgian (Flanders) Albums Chart	39
Belgian (Wallonia) Albums Chart	28
French Albums Chart	56

== Certifications ==
Region	Certification	Certified units/sales
Belgium (BRMA)	2× Platinum	60,000^{*}
France (SNEP)	Platinum	300,000^{*}
^{*} Sales figures based on certification alone.
