= Luc De Vos =

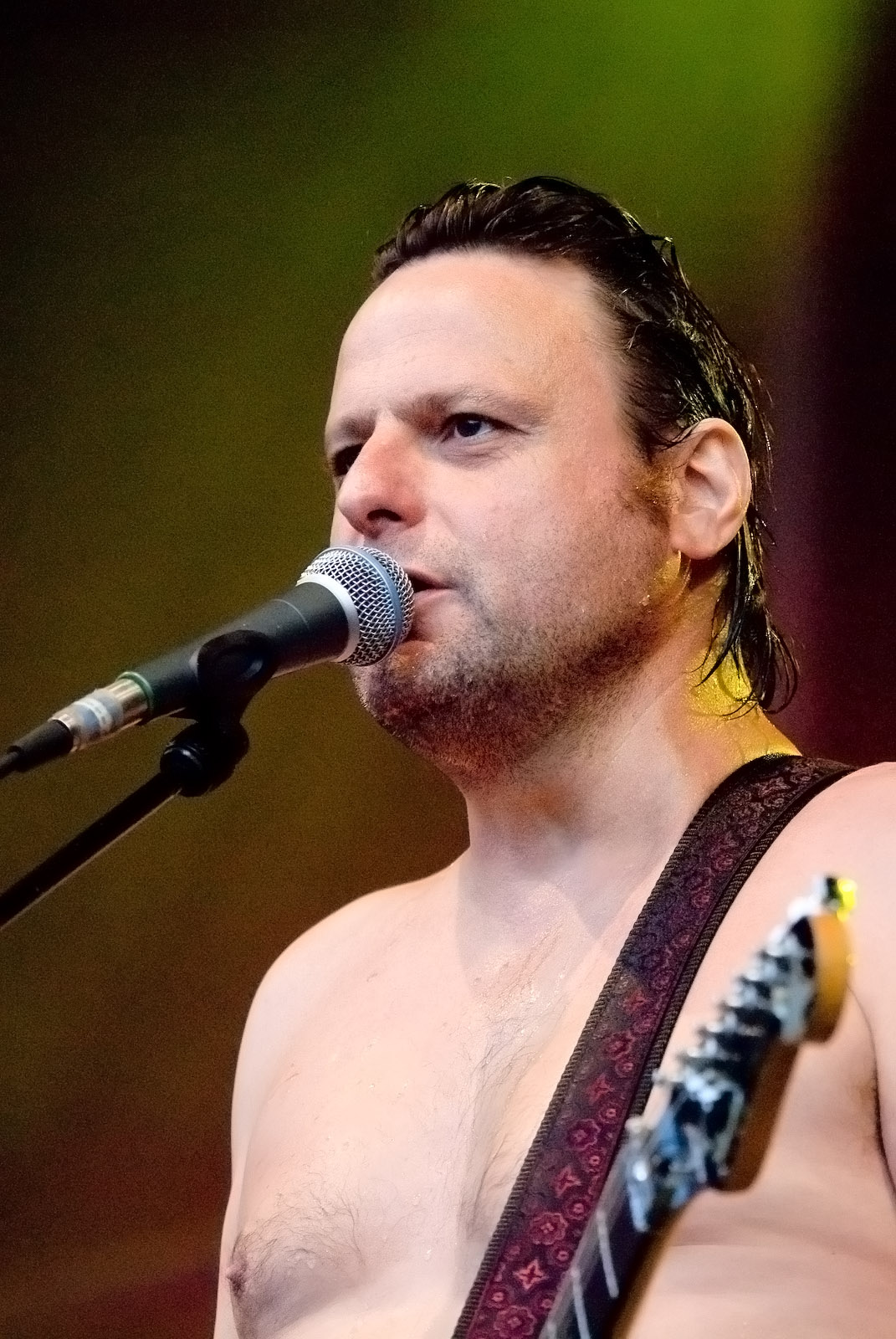
- Luc De Vos at the 0110 concert in Ghent on 1 October 2006.

Background information
- Born: 12 July 1962; Evergem (Wippelgem), Belgium
- Died: 29 November 2014 (aged 52); Ghent, Belgium
- Genres: Alternative rock
- Occupation(s): Musician, singer-songwriter, writer, voice actor
- Instrument(s): Vocals, guitar
- Years active: 1989–2014
- Labels: Virgin Records, Sony Music Entertainment, PIAS
- Website: www.gorki.be

Luc De Vos (12 July 1962 – 29 November 2014) was a Belgian musician and writer, best known as the lead singer of the Dutch-language alternative rock formation Gorki and as a guest in multiple television shows. He also voiced VW bus in the Flemish version of the Disney movie Cars. He died of acute organ failure on the 29 November 2014 in his working apartment in Ghent.

== Early life ==
De Vos was born in 1962 in the village of Wippelgem near Ghent as the youngest of 7 children. He had his secondary education at the Sint-Lievenscollege in Ghent. As a toddler, he knew that he wanted to become a rockstar, a job he described as a privilege rather than a job, once he had it.

== Career ==
=== Musical career ===
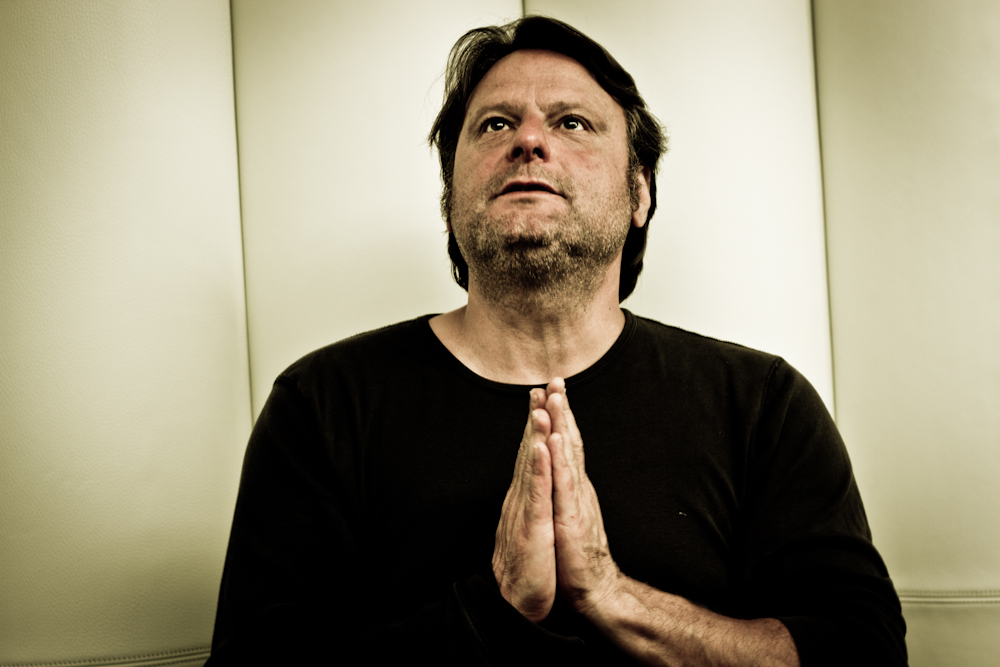
Vos praying before performing, June 2014

With his original band Gorky, De Vos ended third in Humo's Rock Rally in 1990. Together with Noordkaap, who won the same Rock Rally, he brought the genre of Dutch language rock music to the people's attention. After Gorky disbanded in 1993, Luc De Vos continued under the name Gorki. Stijn Meuris described the genre of Gorki's songs and De Vos's lyrics as "Flemish poetry with the boots in the clay" and "I have no clue what this guy was talking about, but I understood him". Temporary side projects of De Vos include English language rock formation Automatic Buffalo which he started with the members of Ashbury Faith, and a solo tour in 2010.

With his bands Gorky/Gorki, he had 3 singles and 12 albums in the Flemish charts (the album charts only start in 1995, i.e. after his first albums were released). This included 5 top ten albums.

=== Writing career ===
Luc De Vos wrote columns for, among others, Flemish radio station Studio Brussel and the Ghent city magazine Zone 09/. He also wrote several books, the most recent of which, Paddenkoppenland (Toadheadsland), was described as an autobiography even though De Vos himself denied this.

== Death ==
Luc De Vos was found dead in the early evening of 29 November 2014 in his working apartment in Ghent. After an autopsy, both suicide and malicious intent were ruled out. The cause of death was concluded to be acute failure of vital organs. He left a wife and a son.

De Vos' public funeral at Saint Peter's Church in Ghent took place on Saturday 6 December 2014. Around 15,000 people assembled outside on the Saint Peter's Square as the church was full. He was buried in the famous Catholic cemetery of Campo Santo.

== Legacy ==
Luc De Vos's most famous song was "Mia". Though originally a B-side, it soon grew to be one of the most popular songs in Flanders, as well as gaining a cult following in the Netherlands, having been voted top of multiple radio station's lists of most timeless songs, including reaching the #1 spot three years in a row on "De Tijdloze 100", the best song of all-time list voted for by the listeners of Studio Brussel. The song has given its name to the MIA's, the music awards for Belgian artists.
