= Gorki (band) =

Belgian rock band

- Gorky around 1992: Wout de Schutter, Luc de Vos, Geert Bonne.

Background information
- Origin: Ghent, Belgium
- Genres: Pop-rock
- Years active: 1989–1993 (as Gorky); 1993–2014 (as Gorki)
- Labels: Virgin Records (1993 – 1996 & 1999); Sony Music Entertainment (1996 – 2000); PIAS (2000 – 2014)
- Members: Luc de Vos; Erik van Biesen; Luc Heyvaerts; Bert Huysentruyt; Thomas Vanelslander
- Past members: Wout de Schutter; Geert Bonne; Wim Rogge; Steven van Havere; Eric Bosteels
- Website: gorki.be

Gorki (originally Gorky) was a Belgian rock group, in its most recent line-up consisting of Luc de Vos (lead singer and guitarist), Luc Heyvaerts (keyboard and clarinet), Erik van Biesen (bass guitar), Thomas Vanelslander (guitarist) and Bert Huysentruyt (drums). Three songs by Gorki were number one hits in the Studio Brussel alternative hitlist De Afrekening in Belgium: 'Lieve kleine piranha' (Gorky, 1992), 'Schaduw in de schemering (from the CD 'Plan B') and 'Joerie' in 2006. Luc De Vos died on 29 November 2014.

== Biography ==
=== Gorky ===
The band was originally named Gorky, and the first members were Luc de Vos, Wout de Schutter and Geert Bonne. In 1990, the group finished 3rd in Humo's Rock Rally, a contest for upcoming Belgian talent organised by the popular magazine Humo. In 1991 the band rose through with the single "Anja", referring to a Dutch singer from the 1960s with that name.

=== "Mia" ===
After "Anja", several other singles were released from the debut album Gorky. Among them was "Soms vraagt een mens zich af" ("Sometimes a man wonders"), the B-side of which was "Mia", a song that finished as number one for three years in a row on the "best song of all time" chart by the music station Studio Brussel. Likewise, it reached number 1 in a similar chart of Radio 1 in Flanders, and was named best Belgian song on the chart by Radio Donna in 2005.

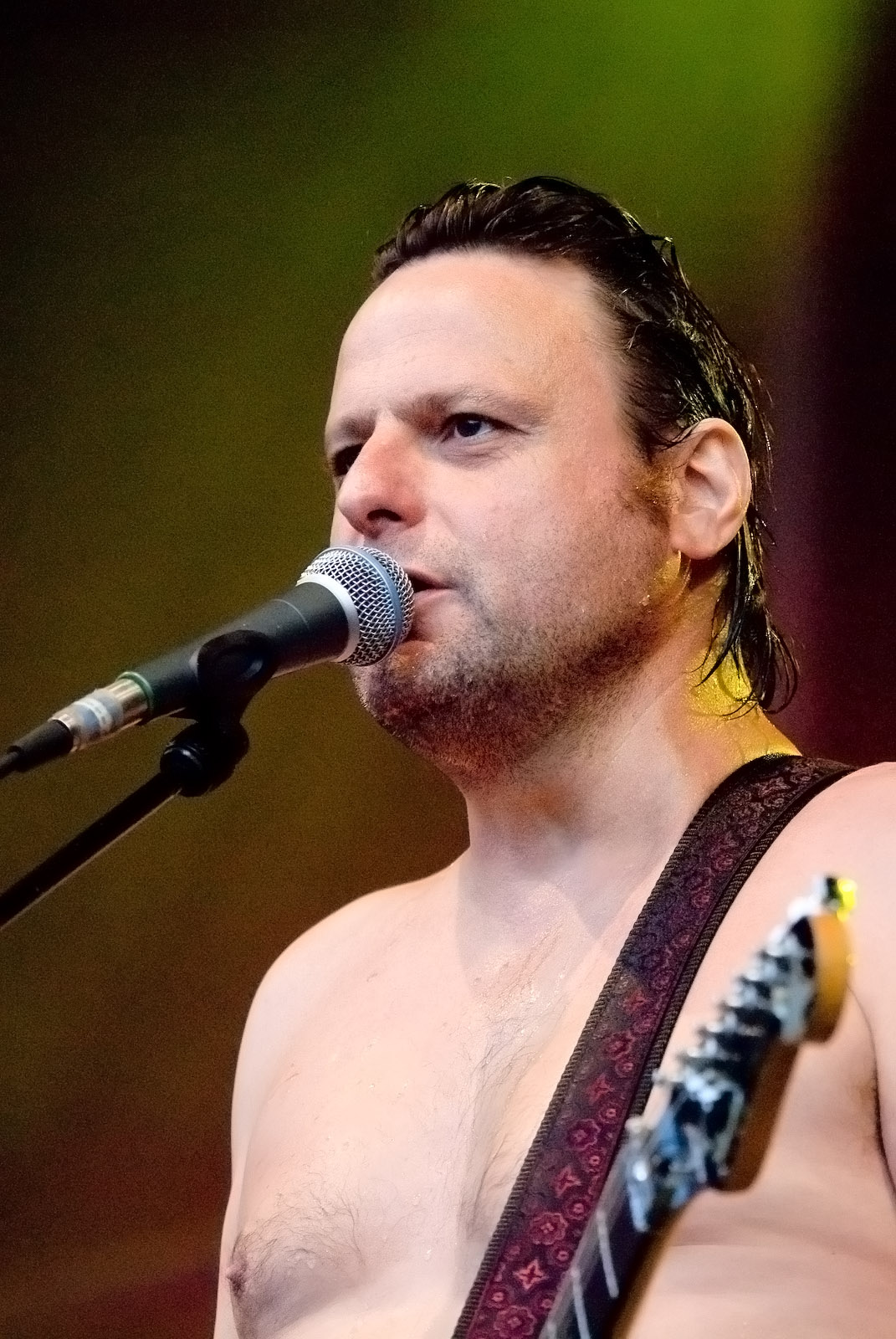
Luc de Vos performing in 2006

In 2006, it was elected the best song about girls on a TV-show on the public network één. In 2008, the early music consort Capilla Flamenca issued "Rosa (Mia)", a polyphonic adaptation of "Mia" sung in Latin. In 2008 a new award show was founded called "de MIA's" (the MIAs). It was named after the best Flemish song of all times and officially stands for the Music Industry Awards.

=== Death of Luc de Vos ===
Luc de Vos died of acute organ failure on 29 November 2014, between 17:00 and 17:30 at the age of 52, leaving a wife and son. The band ceased to exist thereafter.

== Members ==
=== Current ===
- Luc de Vos – vocals, guitar (1989–2014)
- Thomas Vanelslander – guitar (2011–2014)
- Erik van Biesen – bass (1993–2014)
- Bert Huysentruyt – drums (2011–2014)
- Luc Heyvaerts - keyboard (1996–2014)

=== Former ===
- Wim Rogge – guitar (1992–1997)
- Wout de Schutter – bass (1989–1992)
- Geert Bonne – drums (1989–1992)
- Steven van Havere – drums (1993–1999)
- Eric Bosteels – drums (2000–2011)

== Discography ==
=== Studio albums ===
Title	Album details
Gorky	Released: February 24, 1992; Label: Virgin
Boterhammen	Released: November 23, 1992; Label: Virgin
Hij Leeft	Released: 1993; Label: Virgin
Monstertje	Released: April 18, 1996; Label: Virgin
Ik Ben Aanwezig	Released: March 02, 1998; Label: Columbia
Eindelijk Vakantie!	Released: January 28, 2000; Label: Epic
Vooruitgang	Released: May 17, 2002; Label: Lipstick Notes
Plan B	Released: April 15, 2004; Label: PIAS
Homo Erectus	Released: January 02, 2006; Label: PIAS
Voor Rijpere Jeugd	Released: 2008; Label: PIAS
Research & Development	Released: April 16, 2011; Label: PIAS

=== Compilation albums ===
Title	Album details
Het Beste van Gorki	Released: January 25, 1999; Label: Virgin
Het Beste van Gorki Live	Released: November 28, 2003; Label: PIAS
Anja Loves Ninja	Released: November 02, 2012; Label: EMI
Alles Moet Weg	Released: 2019; Label: CNR Music Belgium
VOS	Released: October 18, 2024; Label: Lipstick Notes
Oude Reus (featuring Luc de Vos)	Released: December 06, 2024; Label: Lipstick Notes
