= Axelle Red =

Belgian singer-songwriter (born 1968)

- Axelle Red in 2026.

Background information
- Born: Fabienne Demal; 15 February 1968 (age 58); Hasselt, Belgium
- Genres: Pop, Soul
- Occupations: Singer, songwriter
- Years active: 1993–present
- Labels: Former: Virgin; Current: Music & Roses
- Website: Official website

Fabienne Demal (born 15 February 1968), better known by her stage name Axelle Red, is a Belgian singer-songwriter. She has released 12 albums, including Sans plus attendre, À Tâtons, Toujours Moi and Jardin Secret. She is best known for her 1993 single "Sensualité", a hit in France in 1994.

== Biography ==
=== Early years ===
Red was born as Fabienne Demal on 15 February 1968 in Hasselt, Flanders, Belgium, the daughter of Roland Demal, a solicitor in Hasselt and a councillor for the Flemish Liberals and Democrats (VLD) in the City Council. She has lived in Paris and currently lives in a village near Brussels. In 1983, aged 14, Fabienne Demal produced her first single, "Little Girls", using the artist name Fabby. In 1986, she chose the artist name Axelle Red. Her stage name was not only a reference to the color of her hair. It was also a nod to the character of the singer, namely 'fiery' and 'fighting'.

=== 1990s ===
Red graduated from the Vrije Universiteit Brussel (VUB) as a lawyer in 1993.

Despite her Flemish origin, she decided to focus on a French-language career. In 1993, her debut album Sans Plus Attendre was released, which immediately resulted in her artistic break-out in France, Switzerland, Canada and Belgium, where sales amounted to more than 200,000.

Axelle Red received an International Federation of the Phonographic Industry platinum award for sales of more than 1 million; a year later she sold out the Paris Olympia for the first time.

In 1998, she married Filip Vanes (still her husband and manager at Music & Roses).

That year, she also sang the official anthem, "La Cour des Grands", with Youssou N'Dour at the opening ceremony of the 1998 FIFA World Cup in the Stade de France outside Paris, before a television audience of over a billion people. Seven months pregnant with her daughter, Janelle, in her shows devoted to soul and rhythm and blues she was joined by her heroes, Wilson Pickett, Sam Moore, Eddie Floyd, Percy Sledge and Ann Peebles. Axelle supported Amnesty International's grand benefit concert in Paris, although under doctor's orders, she was advised not to perform herself due to her pregnancy. That same year saw the release of her Spanish album, Con Solo Pensarlo.

In 1999, Red received the most important music award in France for female artist of the year, the Victoire de la Musique, while her third studio album, Toujours Moi, was also released, written and produced by herself. It sold more than 800,000 copies.

=== 2000s ===
In 2002, her fourth studio album, Face A / Face B, was released. The title refers to the vinyl records from the sixties labelled "fast and slow" side (an up-tempo side for dancing and a ballad side for slows). It was a co-production with producer Al Stone.

In 2003, her second daughter, Gloria, was born. A CD box was also released comprising three CDs with numerous previously unreleased tracks such as duets with Charles Aznavour, Francis Cabrel, Stephan Eicher, Sylvie Vartan, Arno and Tom Barman. Her duet with Renaud, "Manhattan-Kaboul", had the most airplay in France that year and notched up sales of more than 800,000 singles, for which Axelle and Renaud received an NRJ music award at Midem in Cannes.

In 2004, Axelle made her acting debut in Rudolf Mestdagh's film Ellektra.

French Soul, her first 'Best Of' compilation, was released with two previously unreleased songs "I Have A Dream" and "J'ai Fait Un Rêve", an homage to Martin Luther King Jr. Axelle directed the two videos herself. Pregnant with a third daughter, Billie, she ended the year with a lightning visit to Sri Lanka with UNICEF emergency aid for the people who had been hit so badly by the tsunami.

In May, she joined Peter Gabriel and Youssou N'Dour at the Geneva concert on the occasion of the 60th anniversary of the United Nations, at which Axelle was thanked by Kofi Annan for her humanitarian work with the various NGOs. Together with Bob Geldof, she was also the spokesperson for Live 8 in France and performed on 2 July 2005 at the Palace of Versailles in front of 200,000 people during the benefit.

2006 saw the release of Jardin Secret, Axelle's fifth studio album. The tracks were recorded in Willie Mitchell's Royal Studios in Memphis. In September 2006, Axelle received the highest artistic honour, becoming Chevalier dans l'Ordre des Arts et des Lettres, presented to her by the French Minister of culture, Renaud Donnedieu de Vabres. She also took part in the 0110 concerts against intolerance and racism in Antwerp and Brussels.

In 2008 she wrote her first album in English, Sisters & Empathy, and recorded it with her regular musicians, Michael Toles and Lester Snell from Memphis and Jeff Anderson and Damon Duewhite from New York City.

=== 2010s ===
Axelle Red live in Antwerp in 2026

In 2011, a new album was released, Un Coeur Comme le Mien (A heart like mine), carried by the single La Claque. It became a certified gold record in Belgium. After two concerts in May in Paris and Brussels, a tour was scheduled from October 2011 to summer 2012.

The album Rouge Ardent from 2013 marked a return to soul pop. Different musicians cooperated on this album: Gérard Manset, author of Je te l'avais dit, Christophe Miossec and Stephan Eicher, in co-writing for De mieux en mieux, and Albert Hammond (Ce cœur en or, Je te l'avais dit) the album was number 1 when it was released in Belgium and went gold in Belgium.

Also in 2013, an Axelle Red Fashion Victim exhibition was presented at the Modemuseum in her hometown, Hasselt.

She joined the jury for the third season of The Voice van Vlaanderen, broadcast from January to May 2014 on VTM. On 30 October 2015, The Songs (Acoustic) was released, an acoustic compilation of covers and some original tracks. On Exil, her album released in 2018, Axelle Red switched from soul to more electronic and rock music. Once more, Albert Hammond cooperated on this album, together with Shelly Peiken and Dave Stewart. The album's release was followed by a tour in Belgium and France.

=== 2020s ===
Axelle Red performing in 2026

Somewhat different from her repertoire, in 2022 Red released a Christmas album with covers. The album contains soulful versions of songs like "Let It Snow" and "Little Drummer Boy", but above all she focussed on less common songs. The album was followed by a winter tour, and the 2022 Night of the Proms also featured Axelle Red, next to Nik Kershaw and Kool & the Gang.

In 2023, a new tour in Belgium celebrates her thirty-year career, and features mostly best-of setlists.

In 2026, Red became a coach on the twelfth season of The Voice Belgique.

== Social activities ==
Since 1997, Axelle Red has been an ambassador for the United Nations Children's Fund (UNICEF), standing up for the rights of children and women in war-torn regions and developing countries. That same year she devoted herself to the Ottawa Convention against land mines and in the poverty-stricken Haiti.

After being forced to flee the riots in the Democratic Republic of the Congo in June 2004, in July of that year Axelle campaigned in Niger with UNICEF against female circumcision and child marriages.

Red travelled to the north of Senegal in 2005 for the French Oxfam/Agir Ici's campaign, "Make noise till Hong Kong". She spoke up for honest trade prices. At the European summit, Axelle officially asked José Manuel Barroso, chairman of the European Commission, to increase the budget for the development of the Third World countries.

In 2007, Axelle visited poverty-stricken Sierra Leone for the UNICEF campaign "Together, saving 4 million babies", five years after the civil war. Sierra Leone has the largest child mortality in the world. In March 2007, Axelle spoke at the FIFDH (International Film Festival and Forum on Human Rights) in Geneva together with the Cambodian director, Rithy Panh, during a debate on prostitution. In December 2007, King Albert II presented her with the medal of Commandeur in de Kroonorde for her social commitment.

In May 2008, the University of Hasselt awarded Axelle the honorary title of Doctor Honoris Causa for her social commitment as an artist and human rights' activist. On the occasion of International Women's Day, Axelle was guest speaker at the Council of Europe during a debate on domestic violence.

As ambassador for Handicap International in 2022, she visited the organization's workshop in Colombia, where efforts are being made to clear the soil of land mines, inch by inch.

== Discography ==
- Sans plus attendre (1993)
- À tâtons (1996)
- Con solo pensarlo (1998)
- Toujours moi (1999)
- Alive (in concert) (2000)
- Face A / Face B (2002)
- Jardin secret (2006)
- Sisters & Empathy (2008)
- Un coeur comme le mien (2011)
- Rouge Ardent (2013)
- Exil (2018)
- The Christmas Album (2022)

== Honours and awards ==
=== Decorations ===
- Commandeur de l'Ordre des Arts et des Lettres: 2006
- Commandeur in the Belgian Order of the Crown: 2007

=== Distinctions ===
- Doctoratus honoris causa of the Hasselt University: 2008

=== Awards ===
- Victoires de la Musique: Female artist of the Year: 1999
- IFPI Platinum Europe Awards: 2002 (for 1 million sales of the album "À Tâtons")
- Victoires de la Musique: Original song of the year: 2003 (for "Manhattan-Kaboul" with Renaud)
- NRJ's NRJ Music Awards: Best French song for "Manhattan-Kaboul" with Renaud: 2003
- NRJ Music Awards: Best French duo with Renaud: 2003
- Straffe Madam Award: 2007
- Humo's Pop Poll: Best Belgian singer: 2008
- Gouden Klaproos: 2008
- Gouden Huppel of Hasselt: 2014
- Radio 2 Hall of Fame: 2018
- Golden Hasselt Award: 2019
- Music Industry Award: 2026
