= French Soul =

Greatest hits album by Axelle Red
- Released: 2004
- Genre: Pop, pop-soul
- Length: Unknown

Axelle Red chronology
Face A / Face B (2002)	''French Soul'' (2004)	Jardin Secret (2006)

French Soul is a 2004 "best of" album by Belgian pop singer Axelle Red.

== Track listing ==
CD 1

1. "Sensualité" — 3:53
2. "Elle danse seule" — 4:04
3. "Je t'attends" — 3:33
4. "Le Monde tourne mal" — 3:49
5. "À Tâtons" — 3:30
6. "Rien que d'y penser" — 3:08
7. "Ma Prière" — 4:26
8. "À quoi ça sert" — 3:37
9. "Rester femme" — 3:51
10. "Ce Matin" — 2:33
11. "Parce que c'est toi" — 4:08
12. "Faire des mamours" — 4:10
13. "Bimbo à moi" — 3:21
14. "J'ai jamais dit (Je serais ton amie)" — 3:54
15. "Je me fâche" — 3:50
16. "Pas maintenant" — 3:24
17. "Toujours" — 3:30
18. "Manhattan-Kaboul" Renaud and Axelle Red — 3:56

CD 2

1. "J'ai fait un rêve" (soul version) — 7:18
2. "Je pense à toi" (soul version) — 4:01
3. "Vole" (soul version) — 5:30
4. "Blanche Neige" (soul version) — 5:47
5. "Ma Prière" (soul version) — 4:04
6. "Elle danse seule" (soul version) — 4:06
7. "Faire des mamours" (soul version) — 5:32
8. "Voilà tout ce qu'on peut faire" (soul version) — 4:15
9. "Rester femme" (soul version) — 8:37
10. "People Get Ready" (soul version) — 3:33

== Certifications ==
Country	Certification	Date	Sales certified	Physical sales
France	Gold	2004	100,000	
Belgium (Flanders)	Gold	November 20, 2004	20,000	
Belgium (Wallonia)	Gold	November 20, 2004	20,000	

== Charts ==
Chart (2004–2005)	Peak position
Belgian (Flanders) Albums Chart	10
Belgian (Flanders) Alternative Albums Chart	3
Belgian (Flanders) Albums Chart (Belgian albums)	6
Belgian (Flanders) Mid Price Albums Chart	2
Belgian (Wallonia) Albums Chart	12
French Compilations Chart	4
Swiss Albums Chart	45

End of the year chart (2004)	Position
Belgian (Flanders) Albums Chart	54
Belgian (Wallonia) Albums Chart	57
French Compilations Chart	27
End of the year chart (2005)	Position
Belgian (Flanders) Albums Chart	96
