= Sans plus attendre =

Sans Plus Attendre

Studio album by Axelle Red
- Released: 1993
- Recorded: Studio Powertone, Mechelen
- Genre: Pop
- Length: 44:39
- Label: Virgin Records
- Producer: Wouter Van Belle

Axelle Red chronology
Sans Plus Attendre (1993)	À Tâtons (1996)

Sans Plus Attendre is the debut album by Belgian singer Axelle Red, released in 1993.

Five singles were taken from the album: "Kennedy Boulevard", "Elle danse seule", "Je t'attends", "Sensualité" and "Le monde tourne mal".

== Track listing ==
1. "Elle danse seule" (Richard Seff) – 4:01
2. "Amoureuse ou pas" (Edward Holland, Lamont Dozier, Brian Holland, Axelle Red) – 3:23
3. "Vendredi soir" (Brian Nelson, Red) – 2:55
4. "Sensualité" (Albert Hammond, Shelly Peiken, Red) – 3:50
5. "Le monde tourne mal" (R. Seff) – 5:18
6. "Pars" (Daniel Seff, R. Seff) – 3:08
7. "Je t'attends" (D. Seff, R. Seff) – 3:33
8. "Un homme ou une femme" (Wigbert Van Lierde, Red) – 3:28
9. "Femme au volant" (Van Lierde, Red) – 3:41
10. "Les Voisins" (D. Seff, R. Seff) – 3:35
11. "Présence" (D. Seff, R. Seff) – 4:05
12. "Kennedy Boulevard" (D. Seff, R. Seff) – 3:42

== Charts ==
=== Weekly charts ===
Chart (1993–1997)	Peak position
Belgian Albums (Ultratop Flanders)	16
Belgian Albums (Ultratop Wallonia)	19
France (SNEP)	7

=== Year-end charts ===
Chart (1997)	Position
Belgian Albums (Ultratop Flanders)	52
Belgian Albums (Ultratop Wallonia)	30
Chart (1998)	Position
Belgian Albums (Ultratop Flanders)	95

== Certifications ==
Region	Certification	Certified units/sales
Belgium (BRMA)	5× Platinum	150,000^{*}
France (SNEP)	Platinum	300,000^{*}
^{*} Sales figures based on certification alone.
