= Willem Vermandere =

Belgian singer (born 1940)

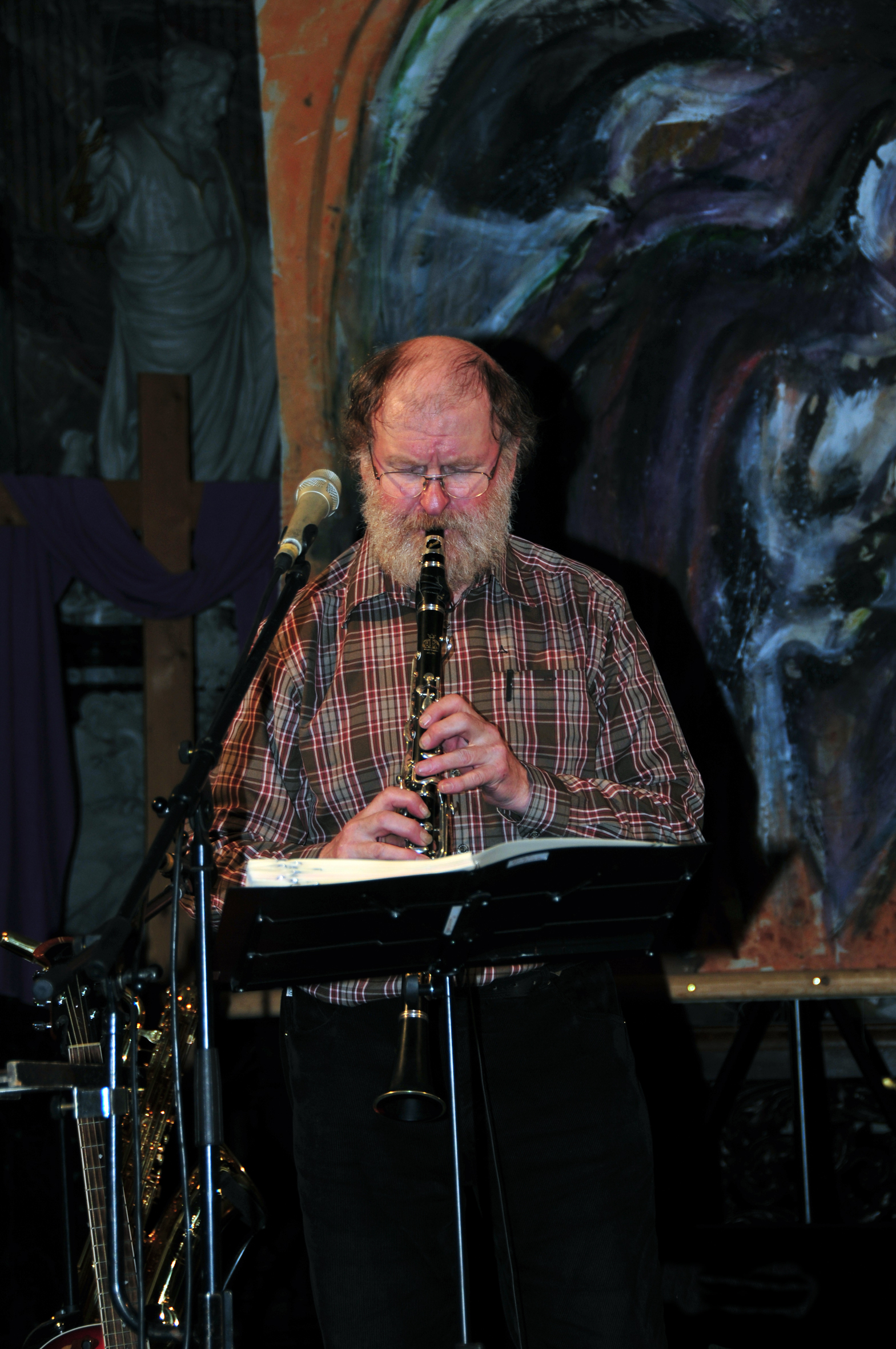
Vermandere in 2010

Willem Vermandere (born 9 February 1940 in Lauwe, Belgium) is a Belgian singer, Flemish cabaret artist, writer, sculptor, guitarist and painter. His songs are written and sung in the dialect of the South of West-Flanders in Belgium. His most famous songs are ‘Klein ventje van Elverdinge’, ‘Lat mie maar lopen’, ‘Als ik zing’, ‘Blanche en zijn peird’, ‘Bange blankeman’, ‘Duizend soldaten’, ‘La Belle Rosselle’ and ‘Ik plantte ne keer patatten’.

== Biography ==
Vermandere studied Religion at Ghent and has been a teacher at Nieuwpoort. Although he is most known for his music, Vermandere is more active as a sculptor. His repertoire expresses criticism on society. His performances are a mixture of seriousness, sadness and fun. His songs can be considered poetry.

He performs as a band with Freddy Desmedt and Pol Depoorter. In 1993 Vermandere wrote the song "Bange Blanke Man" ("Frightened White Man"), a song criticizing racism and xenophobia in a multicultural society. When performing at the Grand-Place in Brussels in 1992 Vermandere was physically assaulted by members of the far-right party Vlaams Blok. He also received letters of threat.

In 2000 he was bestowed with the title of honorary citizen of Veurne, where he currently lives in the suburb of Steenkerke. In 2009 the Flemish station Radio 2 nominated him as a member of the galley of honor for a life filled with music.

== Discography ==
- Liedjes Van De Westhoek, 1968
- Langs De Schreve, 1969
- Willem Vermandere (album),1971
- Vier (album), 1973
- Met Mijn Simpel Lied, 1976
- Lat Mie Maar Lopen, 1981
- Als ik zing', 1984
- Willem Vermandere, 1988
- Ik wil maar zeggen, 1988
- De eerste jaren, 1989
- Lat mie maar lopen, 1991
- Een avond in Brussel, 1990
- Help mij, 1993
- Mijn Vlaanderland, 1995
- De vergeten liedjes, 1996
- In de donkerste dagen, 1997
- Onderweg, 1999
- Gezongen uit de ark, 2000
- De eerste jaren II, 2000
- Van Blanche tot Blankeman, 2000
- Omzwervingen - Liedjes zonder woorden, 2002
- Op den duur, 2003
- Master serie - Willem Vermandere, Het beste van, 2005
- Van soorten, 2005
- Altijd iemands vader, altijd iemands kind, 2006
- Alles gaat over, 2010
- De zanger & de muzikant Vincent Troch', 2012
- Den overkant & de meditaties, 2014
- 14-18 En wat nu?, 2015
- Confessies, 2020

== Books ==
- Thuis en nog veel verder, 2000, Gent, Blobe, 224 pp.
- Van Blanche tot Blankeman, 2007, Lannoo: 122 liedjesteksten
- De zeven laatste woorden, 2013, Lannoo, 70 p.

== Art ==
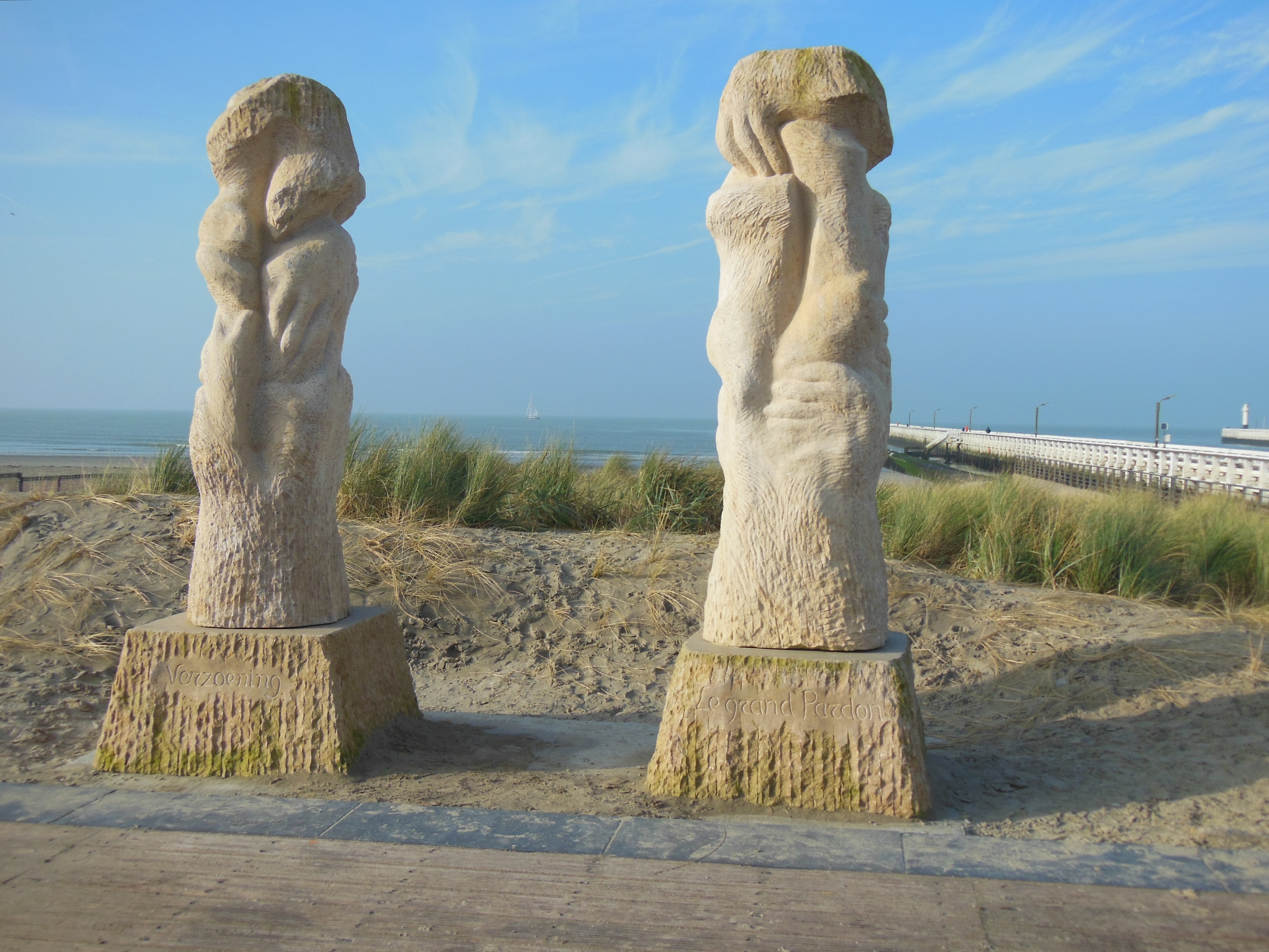
The sculpture Verzoening (Reconciliation) in Nieuwpoort, Belgium

The sculpture Verzoening, in English Reconciliation, was created by Willem Vermandere to commemorate World War I. It was erected October 8, 2014 at the geographical starting point of the Western Front.
