= Dogbowl discography =

- Studio albums: 10
- Live albums: 1
- Compilation albums: 1
- Singles: 2

This article presents the complete oeuvre of American singer-songwriter Dogbowl, also known as Stephen Tunney, including his work as a band member and as a collaborating artist.

== As a Solo artist ==
=== Studio albums ===
Title	Album details
Tit! An Opera	Released: 1989; Label: Shimmy Disc; Format: CS, LP
Cyclops Nuclear Submarine Captain	Released: 1991; Label: Shimmy Disc; Format: CD, CS, LP
Flan	Released: 1992; Label: Shimmy Disc; Format: CD, CS, LP
Project Success	Released: December 8, 1993; Label: Shimmy Disc; Format: CD, LP
The Zeppelin Record	Released: September 1998; Label: Lithium; Format: CD
Fantastic Carburetor Man	Released: 2001; Label: Eyeball Planet; Format: CD
Songs for Narcisse	Released: 2005; Label: Eyeball Planet; Format: CD
Zone of Blue	Released: May 15, 2015; Label: 62TV; Format: CD, LP

=== Collaborative albums ===
Title	Album details
Hot Day in Waco (with Kramer)	Released: October 31, 1994; Label: Shimmy Disc; Format: CD
Gunsmoke (with Kramer)	Released: February 13, 1996; Label: Shimmy Disc; Format: CD

=== Live albums ===
Title	Album details
Live on WFMU	Released: 1995; Label: Lithium; Format: CD
Le Chien Lunatic: Dogbowl Live in Bruxelles	Released: 2003; Label: Eyeball Planet; Format: CD
Dogbowl Live at CBGB 1985–1986	Released: 2007; Label: Eyeball Planet; Format: CD

=== Compilation albums ===
Title	Album details
Best of Dogbowl	Released: 2001; Label: 62TV; Format: CD

== With King Missile ==
Title	Album details
Fluting on the Hump	Released: 1987; Label: Shimmy Disc; Format: LP
They	Released: 1988; Label: Shimmy Disc; Format: CD, LP

== Other credits ==
Year	Artist	Release	Role(s)	Song(s)
1989	Bongwater	Too Much Sleep	Writing	"One So Black"
1992	Bongwater	The Peel Session	Guitar	—
1996	Kramer	Still Alive in '95	vocals, acoustic guitar	—
2001	Dionysos	Haïku Folk	instruments	"Ciel en sauce"
