= Best of Dogbowl – Volume II =

Compilation album by Dogbowl
- Released: 2001
- Recorded: 1989 – 2001
- Studio: Various: Noise New York; (New York City, NY); Noise New Jersey; (Jersey City, NJ); Studios de la Seine; (Paris, France); The Eyeball Planet Studio; (New York City, NY)
- Genre: Psychedelic pop
- Length: 70:35
- Label: 62TV

Dogbowl chronology
Fantastic Carburetor Man (2001)	Best of Dogbowl – Volume II (2001)	Songs for Narcisse (2005)

Best of Dogbowl – Volume II is a compilation album by Dogbowl, independently released in 2001 by 62TV Records. Despite the title's suggestion, there was no other greatest hits album released by Dogbowl.

== Track listing ==
All tracks are written by Dogbowl.

No.	Title	Album (date)	Length
1.	"Hot Day in Waco"	Hot Day in Waco (1994)	4:49
2.	"Hello Helen"	Flan (1992)	1:55
3.	"Womanizer"	The Zeppelin Record (1998)	4:25
4.	"Silkworm Exploding"	Cyclops Nuclear Submarine Captain (1991)	3:07
5.	"Nothing Better"	Gunsmoke (1996)	5:50
6.	"Bus"	Fantastic Carburetor Man (2001)	5:15
7.	"Growing Up in a Wheelchair"	Tit! An Opera (1989)	4:28
8.	"Love Bomb"	Cyclops Nuclear Submarine Captain (1991)	3:47
9.	"Oklahoma"	The Zeppelin Record (1998)	3:58
10.	"Cindy on the Sidewalk"	Gunsmoke (1996)	3:05
11.	"Anastasia"	Tit! An Opera (1989)	4:00
12.	"Cyclops Nuclear Submarine Captain"	Cyclops Nuclear Submarine Captain (1991)	3:42
13.	"Going Out on a Date (With a Girl That You Like)"	Project Success (1993)	1:32
14.	"South American Eye"	Cyclops Nuclear Submarine Captain (1991)	2:47
15.	"The President Was Shot"	The Zeppelin Record (1998)	3:28
16.	"On the Monkey Bars"	Tit! An Opera (1989)	3:26
17.	"Cigars Guitars and Topless Bars"	Live on WFMU (1995)	3:52
18.	"Gunsmoke"	Gunsmoke (1996)	3:01
19.	"Drunk Every Night Over the Blue Fur Bosom Girl"	Drunk Every Night Over the Blue Fur Bosom Girl 7" (1991)	4:08

== Personnel ==
Adapted from Best of Dogbowl – Volume II liner notes.

- Dogbowl – vocals, instruments, production, engineering, cover art

== Release history ==
Region	Date	Label	Format	Catalog
United States	2001	62TV	CD	29846
