= Couleur Café =

Music festival in Brussels

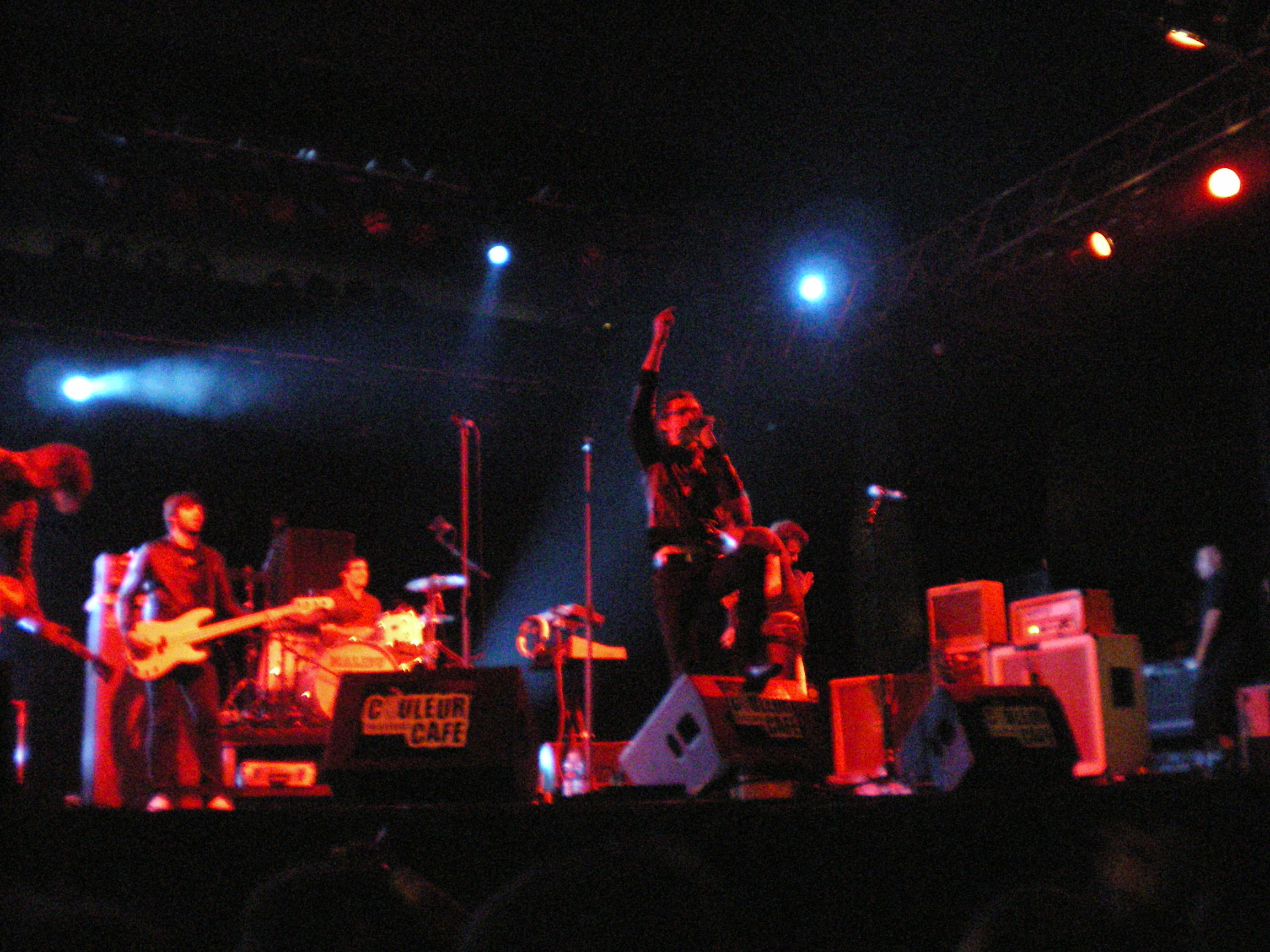
- Malibu Stacy in 2007 at Couleur Café
- Genre: Funk; Hip hop Reggae; Dance; Soul; Blues; Rock
- Dates: End of June/early July
- Locations: Brussels, Belgium
- Years active: 1990–2020, 2022–present
- Capacity: 75,000
- Website: couleurcafe.be

Couleur Café Festival is an annual world and urban contemporary music festival taking place around the end of June or early July in Brussels, Belgium.

== History ==
At its inception in 1990, the festival was organised in the Halles de Schaerbeek/Hallen van Schaarbeek, a cultural centre in the Schaerbeek municipality. In 1994, following work on the Halles de Schaerbeek, the festival moved to the Tour & Taxis site, north-west of the Pentagon (Brussels' city centre). From its 2017 edition, it has been held on the Heysel/Heizel Plateau in northern Brussels, near the Atomium.

== Description ==
The scope of the three-day festival lies on world music with as main styles funk, hiphop, reggae, dance, dub, soul, Latin, blues and rock divided over four stages. Internationally famous acts as well as less known talent or locally popular musicians are represented. Apart from the music itself, there is also a large art exposition, a market with young designers, dance workshops, cocktail bars and food stands from a worldwide variety of kitchens (fifty countries). Festival visitors can camp nearby at Camping Zen.

In 2014, the entire event counted 72,000 visitors over three days.

== Featured performers ==
Performers at previous festivals included:

- 1990: Angélique Kidjo, Irakere, Mamady Keita, Papa Wemba, Zap Mama
- 1991: Mory Kanté
- 1992: Angélique Kidjo, Papa Wemba, The Wailers
- 1993: Classic Swédé Swédé, Mahlathini and the Mahotella Queens, Manu Dibango, Galliano, Mother Earth
- 1994: Johnny Clegg, Mory Kanté, Herbie Hancock
- 1995: Koffi Olomide, Terence Trent D'Arby, Odex Protocole
- 1996: Galliano, Habib Koité, Noa, The Believers
- 1997: Asian Dub Foundation, Maceo Parker, Youssou N’Dour, Ziggy Marley
- 1998: Ciocarlia, Daniela Mercury, Famoudou Konaté, Jimmy Cliff, Khadja Nin, Mamady Keita, Mory Kanté, Natacha Atlas, Starflam, Odex Protocole
- 1999: Cheb Mami, Faudel, Femi Kuti, Krewcial, P18, Zap Mama
- 2000: Alpha Blondy, Amadou & Mariam, Asian Dub Foundation, Candy Dulfer, Orishas, Postmen, The Herbaliser, The Skatalites, The Wailers, Youssou N'Dour, Tomas & Co
- 2001: Baaba Maal, Burning Spear, Carlinhos Brown, Culture, Khaled, Ozomatli, Starflam, Zuco 103
- 2002: Cesária Évora, Daniela Mercury, Horace Andy, Mory Kanté, Orishas, P18, Sizzla, Wawadadakwa, Zuco 103
- 2003: Amparanoia, Asian Dub Foundation, I Muvrini, Israel Vibration, Zaïko Langa Langa, Jimmy Cliff, Kana, Mad Professor, Ojos De Brujo
- 2004: Amparanoia, Ska-P, Souad Massi, Babylon Circus, Amp Fiddler, Gabriel Ríos, Starflam
- 2005: Alpha Blondy, Arno, Femi Kuti, Jah Shaka, Jane Birkin, Kool Shen, Maceo Parker, Magnus, Mahala Raï Banda, Orishas, Rokia Traoré, Youssou N'Dour, Zap Mama, Zita Swoon
- 2006: Amparanoia, Burning Spear, Cali, Gabriel Ríos, George Clinton, Gilberto Gil, Ivete Sangalo, James Brown, Louise Attaque, Off The Record, Patrick Watson, Saïan Supa Crew, Think Of One, Third World, Toumani Diabaté, Tracy Chapman, Vive la Fête, Fab Faya
- 2007: Buscemi, Cassius, Daan, Dj Mehdi, Gotan Project, Kelis, Puggy, Sean Paul, The Roots, The Tellers, Ziggy Marley, Johnny Clegg
- 2008: Aṣa, Erykah Badu, Gentleman, Jimmy Cliff, Kassav', Kery James, Natacha Atlas, Orishas, Zucchero
- 2009: Amadou & Mariam, Alpha Blondy, Arno, Asian Dub Foundation, Babylon Circus, Ben Harper, Benabar, Cesária Évora, Emir Kusturica, Khaled, Keziah Jones, Magic System, Mamady Keita, Oi Va Voi, Ozomatli, Rohff, Selah Sue, Shameboy, Solomon Burke, The Skatalites, Zap Mama
- 2010: 1060, Diam's, Ebony Bones, Femi Kuti, George Clinton, Hindi Zahra, Papa Wemba, Rox, Scylla, Selah Sue, Snoop Dogg, Soprano, Staff Benda Bilili
- 2011: Absynthe Minded, Alborosie, Arsenal, DJ Shadow, Merdan Taplak, Seal, Selah Sue, Yael Naim, Ziggy Marley, Ziggi Recado
- 2012: Jessie J, Erykah Badu, Tinariwen, Sean Paul, De La Soul, Gentleman, Kaer, Stephen Marley, Public Enemy, Gogol Bordello
- 2013: Neneh Cherry, Aloe Blacc, Maceo Parker, Andy Allo, Faithless, Jimmy Cliff, Matisyahu, Fat Freddy's Drop, Mos Def, Salif Keita, Kery James, Joeystarr
- 2014: (planned): Basement Jaxx, Bootsy Collins and the Funk Unity Band, Dizzee Rascal, Parov Stelar Band, Tiken Jah Fakoly, De Jeugd van Tegenwoordig, Dilated Peoples, Girls in Hawaii, Puggy, Morcheeba, Soldout, Seeed, Seun Kuti, La Yegros, Skip & Die, Iron Ites, Captain Steel, Root Pursuit, The Rudies, Burning Spear, Tricky, Ben Howard, Chinese Man, The Subs, Keziah Jones, Chance The Rapper, Laura Mvula, Akua Naru, Cuban Beats All Stars, Veence Hanao, Oyster Node, Selectah Nesta, What It Is, Asian Dub Foundation, Alpha Blondy, Jurassic 5, Blitz The Ambassador, Magnus LIVE, Gabriel Ríos, John Butler Trio, Ky-Mani Marley, Youssoupha, Protoje & The Indiggnation, Danakil, The Soul Rebels, Suarez, Little Collin
- 2015: 1995, Alborosie, Arsenal, Bigflo & Oli, Branko, Buraka Som Sistema, Busta Rhymes, Caravan Palace, Collie Buddz, Crystal Fighters, Cypress Hill, Dub Inc, Ester Rada, Flavia Coelho, G-Eazy, Gentleman, Groundation, Hiatus Kaiyote, Israel Vibration, Jah9, Joey Bada$$, Jupiter & Okwess International, Kasai Allstars, Kavinsky, La Chiva Gantiva, La Fine Equipe, Lefto, Midnite, Milky Chance, Modestep, Naâman, Oddisee, Palenke Soultribe, Pink Oculus, Sergent Garcia, Shantel, SOJA, Starflam, Superdiscount, Tarrus Riley, The Magician, Wu-Tang Clan, Wyclef Jean, Xavier Rudd
- 2016: Akua Naru, Alpha Wann, Apollo Brown, Arno, Atomic Spliff, Black Box Revelation, Bomba Estereo, Brigitte, Bunny Wailer, CHIC ft. Nile Rodgers, Chicos y Mendez, Chronixx, Clap! Clap!, Claptone, Cunninlynguists, De Jeugd van Tegenwoordig, De La Soul, Elito Reve & Su Charangon, Féfé, G.A.N, Ghinzu, Goran Bregovic, GRANDGEORGE, Hudson Mohawke, Ibeyi, Inna Modja, Jamie Woon, Jeremy Loops, Julian Marley, Kano, Kassav, Kel Assouf, Kwabs, LTGL, Magic System, Method Man & Redman, MHD, Morgan Heritage, Mr. Vegas, Nneka Omar Souleyman, Oxmo Puccino, Pat Thomas & Kwashibu Area Band, Pomrad, Protoje, Quantic, Raging Fyah, Roméo Elvis & Le Motel, Selah Sue, Soprano, St Paul and the Broken Bones, Trixie Whitley, Woodie Smalls, Young Fathers, Youssou N'Dour

=== 2017 ===
| | Red Stage | Green Stage | Blue Stage | Elektropedia Black Stage |
|---|---|---|---|---|
| Friday 30 June | Ronnie Flex & Deuxperience Band; Patrice -M- presents Lamomali; Orishas | Pura Vida; Kabaka Pyramid & The Bebble Rockers; Vald; Roméo Elvis x Le Motel; Birdy Nam Nam | J Bernardt; Flavia Coelho; Fatima; Sango | Goodfellas Sound System x Supafly Collective |
| Saturday 1 July | Yaniss Odua; Oumou Sangaré; Emir Kusturica & The No Smoking Orchestra; Toots and The Maytals; The Roots | Sysmo; Scylla; Coely; Niveau4; Tomi & Su Timbalight | Daniel Dzidzonu; Demi Portion; La Dame Blanche; Baloji; LeFtO; Compact Disk Dummies | Goodfellas Sound System x Supafly Collective |
| Sunday 2 July | Jungle by Night; Kery James; Alpha Blondy; Flatbush Zombies; Damian "Jr. Gong" Marley | Caballero & Jeanjass; Jupiter & Okwess; Lil Dicky; Lianne La Havas (solo); Deluxe | Soom T Jmsn; Princess Nokia; Loyle Carner; Guts Live Band; Batuk | Goodfellas Sound System x Supafly Collective |

=== 2018 ===
| | Red Stage | Green Stage | Blue Stage | Black Stage |
|---|---|---|---|---|
| Friday 29 June | Damso; Alborosie; Angèle; Amadou & Mariam | Selah Sue; Ibeyi; Panda Dub; Dubioza Kolektiv; Melanie De Biasio | Mahalia; Oddissee; Togo All stars The Color Grey; Makala, Di-meh, Slim K | |
| Saturday 30 June | Blackwave; George Clinton; Naaman; Chronixx; Residente | Gregory Porter; Akua Naru; Temetan; Leon Bridges; Underachievers | Alia; Niveau4; El Caribe Funk; Tank & The Bangas; Juicy; De palenque a matonge | |
| Sunday 1 July | Coely; Milky Chance; Ziggy Marley; Young Thug; Chinese Man | Calypso Rose; Stikstof; Lee Fields; Tarrius Riley; Fatoumata Diawara | Masego; L'or du commun Meta Meta; Smino; Le 77; Chico y Mendes | |

=== 2019 ===
| | Red Stage | Green Stage | Blue Stage | Black Stage |
|---|---|---|---|---|
| Friday 28 June | Sean Paul; Zwangere Guy; Xavier Rudd; Kabaka Pyramid | Wizkid; Mick Jenkins; Night Lovell; Kokoroko; Les Amazones D'Afrique | Arp Frique; La Yegros; Samory-I; Kojaque; Dvtch Norris | |
| Saturday 29 June | Craig David presents TS5; Salif Keita; Gentleman; Joyner Lucas; Inna De Yard | Kamasi Washington; Tamino; Hamza; Niveau4 XXL; Veence Hanao & Le Motel | Loud; Oshun; BCUC; Hollie Cook; Shayfeen&Madd; Bombataz | |
| Sunday 30 June | Ms. Lauryn Hill; Goran Bregovic; Tiken Jah Fakoly; Protoje | Amparanoia; Groundation; Rejjie Snow; The Cat Empire; Kokoko! | Isha; Sampa The Great; Glauque; Kabola; Lachy Y la Suprema Ley; Martha Da'ro | |

=== 2020–21 ===
Due to the COVID-19 pandemic in Belgium, the 2020 and 2021 editions were cancelled.

=== 2022 ===
| | Red Stage | Green Stage | Black Stage | Dub Stage |
|---|---|---|---|---|
| Friday 24 June | Fally Ipupa; Zwangere Guy; Koffee; Youssou N'Dour | Panda Dub; The Comet is Coming; Caballero & JeanJass; Blaiz Fayah; Jungle By Night | DJ Maphorisa; Black Motion; DJ Nigga Fox; Blck Mamba | O.B.F. Sound System; Reggaebus ft Omar Perry; Weeding Dub; Stand High Patrol DJ-Set; Blackbird Soundsystem |
| Saturday 25 June | Shaggy; Pongo; Afrontal; Yemi Alade; Lila Iké | FRONTAL Soundsystem; Omah Lay; Niveau4; Bas; IAMDDB; Lee Fields | Carl Craig; Romare; Deena Abdelwahed; DC Salas | Aba Shtani-I; Jah Observer; Crucial Alphonso; Mad Codiouf ft Reggaebus; Natural Skanking |
| Sunday 26 June | Nathy Peluso; Dub Inc; Stikstof; AJ Tracey; Sampha The Great | BCUC; Mr Eazi; TiiwTiiw; Cimafunk; Elidad Almeida | Lefto Early Bird; Gilles Peterson; Philou Louzolo; La Dame | O.B.F Soundsystem ft Charlie P & Sr Wilson; Manudigital ft Carporal Negus; Zion Train; Reggaebus; O.B.F Sound System |

=== 2023 ===
| | Red Stage | Green Stage | The Fox | Black Stage | Dub Stage |
|---|---|---|---|---|---|
| Friday 23 June | Roméo Elvis; Fireboy DML; SOJA blackwave. | Ayra Starr; Earl Sweatshirt; Thundercat; Naza; Karpe: Omar Sheriff | ECHT! Peet; Jaz Elise; Sofia Gabanna; M.CHUZI | Danilo Plessow (MCDE); Coco Em; DTM Funk; Coco Maria | Kanka; Mahom; Dub Engine; Bisou; Reggaebus Soundsystem |
| Saturday 24 June | Protoje; TAYC; Coely; Seun Kuti & Egypt 80; Mortimer | Innoss'B; Niveau4; BNXN; ArrDee; Orchestra Baobab | Lander & Adriaan; Compota de Manana; Jazz Brak; JUICY; Kuna Maze | Jyoty; Kampire; Nídia; Yooth x Bona Léa | Wicked and Bonny ft Berise; Iration Steppas; King Shiloh + Black Omolo; Joe Yorke & Purkins; Reggaebus SoundSystem |
| Sunday 25 June | Joey Bada$$ Black Sherif; Tash Sultana; Gente de Zona; Kabaka Pyramid | London Afrobeat Collective; ISHA; EARTHGANG; The Cavemen; YENDRY | La Jungle; Kin'gongolo Kiniata; Neue Grafik Ensemble; Flohio; Reinel Bakole | DJ Vega; Branko; DJ Lag; M I M I | Vandal; Anthony B ft. Little Lion Sound; Reggaebus SoundSystem; Little Lion Sound; Atili |

=== 2024 ===
| | Red Stage | Green Stage | The Fox | Black Stage | Dub Stage | La Plancha |
|---|---|---|---|---|---|---|
| Friday 28 June | Julian Marley; Disiz; Frenna & The Gang; Masego | Meryl; Jesse Royal; SiR; Ghetts; Blaqbonez | Hilk van JMF; MonoNeon; DIKKE; Swing; Kabola | Ninette; Golden Zebora; BurunTuma; VHOOR; Musa Keys | METTA FREQUENCIES ft Anthony John; Aba Shanti-I meets Jah Observer; Alpha Steppa & Awa Fall; Sumac Dub; Reggaebus Soundsystem; Imperial Sound Army | Manteiga; Sylvia; Mambele |
| Saturday 29 June | Steel Pulse; Ferre Gola; Lila Iké; Action Bronson; Bad Gyal | Nubya Garcia; Compota de Manana; Brihang; Biga*Ranx; Broederliefde | Morgan; Martha Da'ro; Cristale; TUKAN; Aunty Rayzor; Catu Diosis | RaQL b2b Bo Meng; Moonshine; JAEL; Skyla Tylaa | Roots Explosion; Reggaebus SoundSystem; Mafia & Fluxy meets Megumi Mesaku; Iseo & Dodosound; Tetra Hydro K | Papi da Silva; DJ NC; Ekany |
| Zondag 30 juni | Romain Virgo; Charlotte Adigéry & Bolis Pupul; Stikstof; Tems; Sidiki Diabaté | Sho Madjozi; Fatoumata Diawara; Busy Signal; NIVEAU4; JPEGMafia | STACE; Lord Apex; Nubiyan Twist; Jah Lil; Fulu Miziki Kolektiv | Cheb Runner; Paula Tape; Bibi Seck; Austin Millz | Reggabus Soundsystem; Unlisted Fanatic presents the UFO Collective; Sanga Mama Africa ft Black Omolo; Telly*; JAEL; O.B.F x Iration Steppas | DJ G-Lo; DJ iNess; Ice-T; Cuuurtis |

=== 2025 ===
| | Red Stage | Green Stage | The Fox | Black Stage | Dub Stage | La Plancha |
|---|---|---|---|---|---|---|
| Friday 27 June | Baloji; DYSTINCT; Little Simz; Omah Lay | Etuk Ubong; Jordan Rakei; Kin'Gongola Kiniata; Pa Salieu | MAVEE; Ife Ogunjobi; Tawsen; Toya Delazy; Maraboutage | O'SIMMIE b2b Kevin Kofii th4ys Rosa Pistola; Zack Fox | Feminine Hi-Fi; ReggaeBus; Jideh High Elements; Higher Meditation ft. Jah Marnyah and Nia Songbird; Kanka; Mala | B2B2B; DDVRKK; Jacques Jaguar; Mambele |
| Saturday 28 June | Kofi Stone; Burning Spear; Werrason; Shenseea; Nathy Peluso | Jalen Ngonda; Maureen; Jazz Brak; Niveau4; L'Entourloop | JAZMYN; BNNYHUNNA; Mo'Kalamity; Aili; Bamby | Rrita Jashari b2b Clara! b2b Laryssa Kim; Karen Nyame KG; Crystallmess; Nooriyah | Youthie; Tippy I Jah Version; Ondubground; Reggaebus; Mahom | Ravi Bongo; Brownsugvr; Joliiah; TUTUMIMI |
| Sunday 29 June | Groundation; TIF; Dino D'Santiago; Davido; Denzel Curry | Jungeli; Kokoroko; Saïan Supa Celebration; DIKKE; Queen Omega & The Royal Souls | Camille Yembe; Godson; Blanco; Tshegue; Kybba; Missy Da Kunt | Susobrino; LA CREOLE: Sylvere & Missy Da Kunt; Heaven Sam; Blck Mamba b2b BAMBII | Docta G CHATON; Supa Mana; Joe Yorke; Crucial Alphonso; Micah Shemaiah; Manudigital feat. Dapatch | Keesha; Chicago; Jolani; Armizy |
