= Dog bowl =

Dog bowl may refer to:

- A type of bowl designed for use by dogs
- Dog Bowl (sculpture), sculpture by William Wegman
- Dog Bowl, American television program
- Dogbowl, American artist and musician
  - Dogbowl discography
