= Jah People =

American roots reggae band

- Origin: Philadelphia, Pennsylvania, U.S.
- Genres: Roots reggae, funk, rock, soul
- Years active: 2012–present
- Awards: PHL Live World Music Category Winner (2015)
- Members: Dean Rubenstein; Alesia Dessau; Noah Sokoloff; Andrew Walls; Mike Stankus; Anthony Gentile; Kevin Farrow
- Website: jah-people.com

Jah People is an American roots reggae band from Philadelphia, Pennsylvania. Founded in 2012, Jah People began primarily as a cover band performing classic reggae hits from Bob Marley including "Exodus", "Is This Love" and "Redemption Song". The group grew a local interest by embodying Marley's message of love and spirituality, with a blend of musicality to meld funk, rock, reggae, and soul influences. Jah People began to create original songs, such as "Karma Flow" and "Selfish" in 2014, with the title song "Rising High" as an update to Marley's "Exodus" from his ninth studio album. The group is a part of the growing reggae scene in the arts-centered city of Philadelphia, Headlining in the 2015, 2016 and 2018 Caribbean Festival at Penn's Landing.

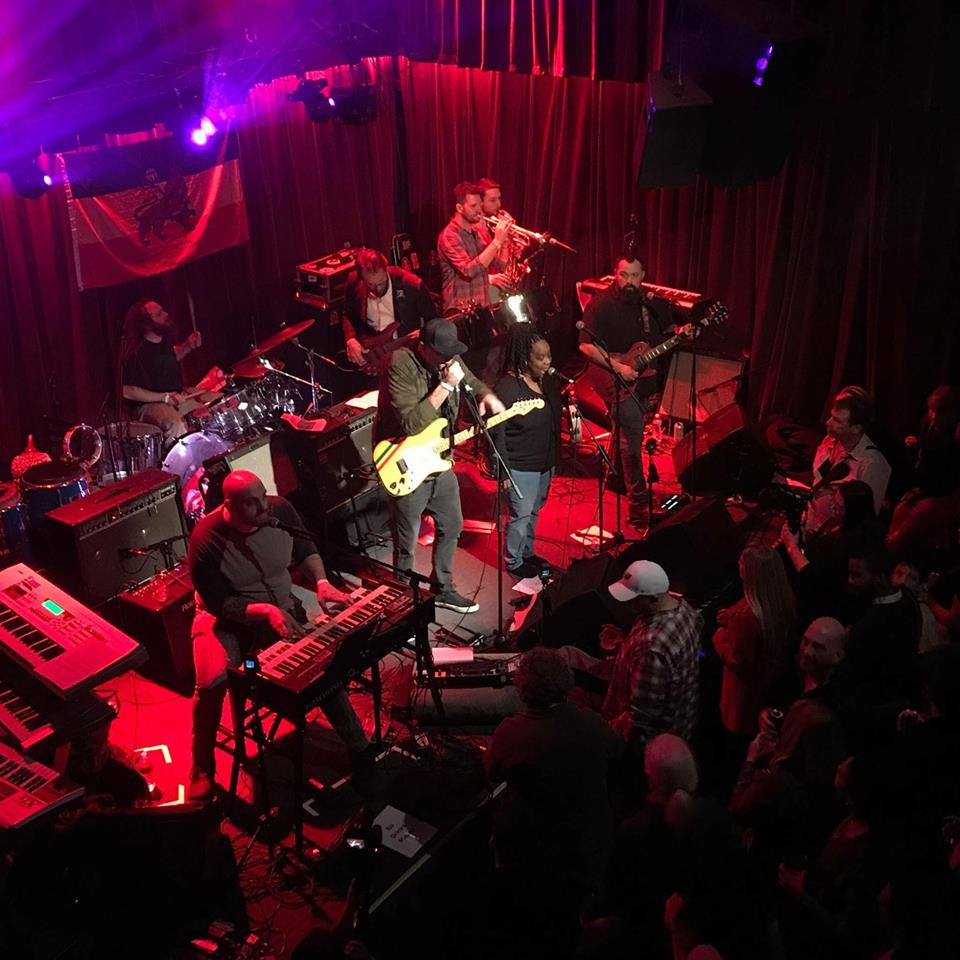
Jah People live at Ardmore Music Hall

In 2015, Jah People was awarded Best in the "World Music" category of the PHL Live music competition sponsored by Philadelphia City Councilman David Oh. They have opened four times for Bob Marley's touring collective, The Wailers, UB40, Jesse Royal, Tarrus Riley, Junior Marvin and has collaborations and/or recordings with rapper Freeway, Nigel Hall from The band Lettuce and American Idol runner up, Justin Guarini.

The band traverses the Mid-Atlantic states (Maryland, Pennsylvania, Delaware, Washington DC, New York and New Jersey) with their renditions of selections from the Marley songbook and songs from their 2015 Rising High release and much more. In August 2018 and once again in August 2019, Jah People was hired to perform for Super Bowl champions, Philadelphia Eagles as the exclusive performers for the team and their families at the annual family BBQ at Novacare complex.

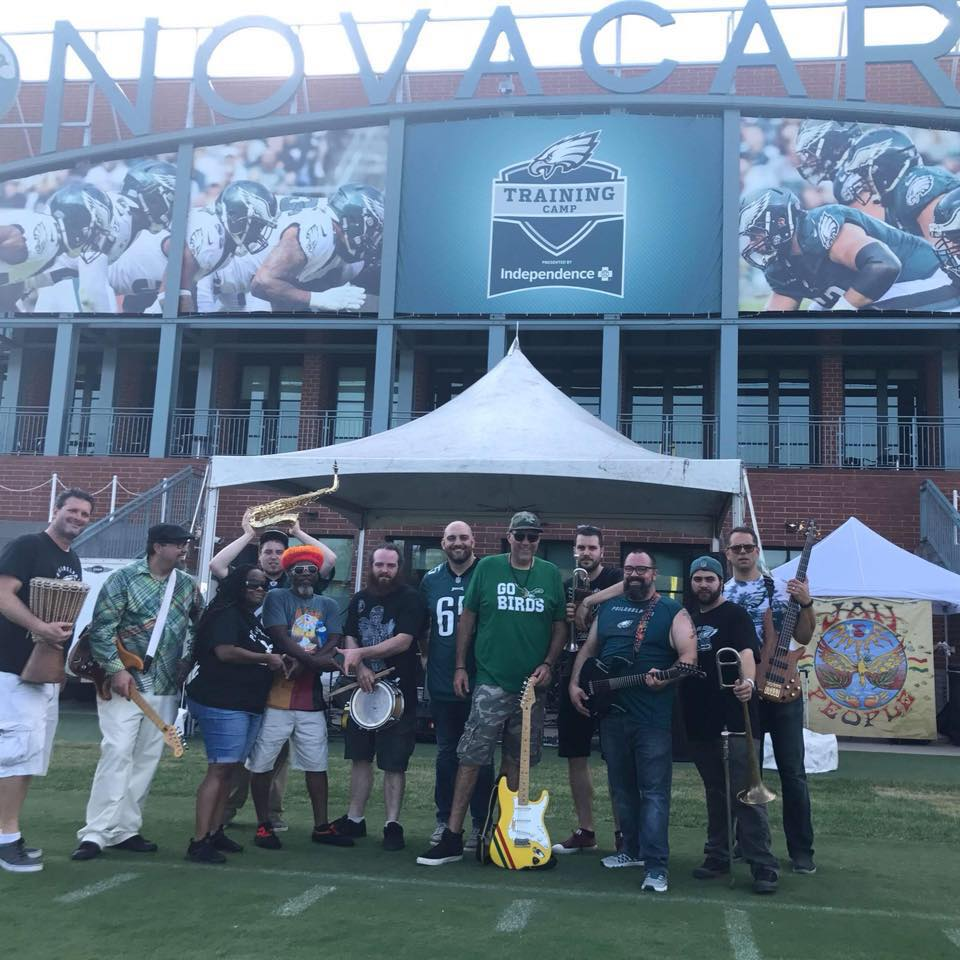
Jah People at the Philadelphia Eagles Annual BBQ

The tense climate in the region and the country in 2016 urged Jah People to use their platform and stages to encourage peace and harmony during the 2016 "Pop-Ups For Peace" tour - stops included SteelStacks in Bethlehem, PA, and Philadelphia's PHLLive Kickoff Concert and City Summer Concert Series, with pop-up shows at surprise locations. In May 2016, they performed for the Roots Rock Run 5K, an annual fundraiser by Black Thought of The Roots for youth programs in Philadelphia.

In March 2020, Jah People embarked on their first week long residency in Key West, Florida. This concert series of events was dubbed "Rising High; Reggae on The Rock", With all proceeds benefiting The Bahamas' hurricane relief fund. The humanitarian mission was kicked off by a day long reggae bill headlined by Jah People, held on Key West's main strip, Duval street.

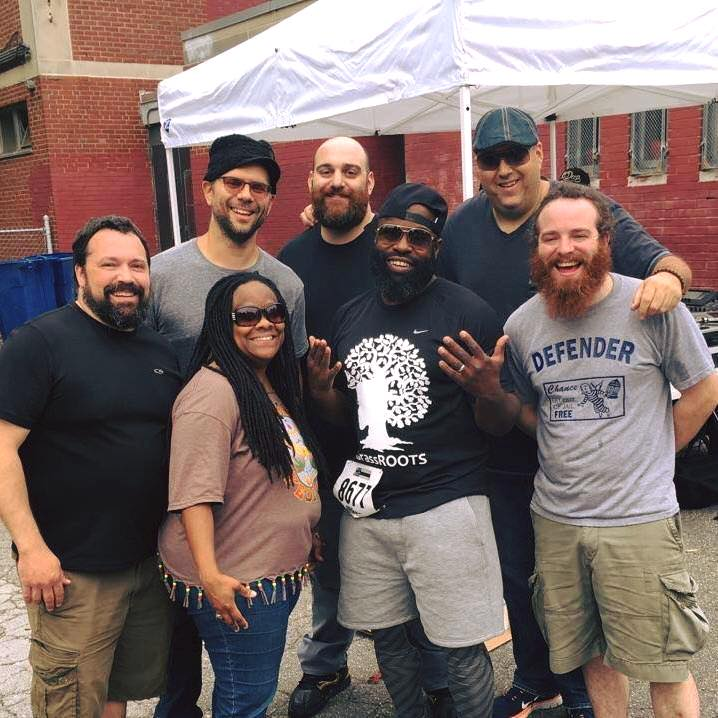
Jah People with Black Thought of The Roots

== Members ==
The band consists of core members: Dean Rubenstein (vocals / guitar), Alesia Dessau (vocals / percussion), Noah Sokoloff (vocals / keys), Andrew Walls (drums), Mike Stankus (bass), Anthony Gentile (guitar / vocals), Kevin Farrow (percussion / Harmonica) - each individual bringing unique a set musical influences to the group.

== Genres ==
Jah People's live performances are anchored in roots reggae, which is the spiritual and aspirational subgenre of reggae popular from 1974 to 1983, but the group is known to add other genres to the mix. Live performances are peppered with reggae classics, as well as standards from the worlds of funk, rock, and soul. The group's original music includes cross-genre guest appearances, including a verse from Philadelphia rapper Freeway on the title track "Rising High".

== Cover catalog ==
Common cover songs
Punky Reggae Party	Trenchtown Rock	Stir It Up
Fly Like An Eagle	Three Little Birds	Many Rivers to Cross
Them Belly Full	Turn Your Light Down	Exodus
Positive Vibration	I Shot The Sheriff	Could You Be Loved
Get Up Stand Up	No Woman No Cry	The Heathen
War	Jammin'	So Much Things To Say
Natural Mystic	Harder They Come	Guiltiness
Buffalo Soldier	Kinky Reggae	Waiting In Vain
Natty Dread	Fire On The Bayou	Satisfy My Soul
Is This Love	One Love	Rebel Music

== Band name origin ==
Rastafari call God Jah. The name inhabits the spiritual aspect of honoring God. Bob Marley spoke about the "movement of Jah people" in 1977 on British television's "Top of the Pops" when he played his hit "Exodus" against a backdrop painting of Marcus Garvey and Haile Selassie.
