= Peace Is the Mission =

Studio album by Major Lazer
- Released: June 1, 2015
- Length: 32:02
- Label: Mad Decent
- Producers: Diplo; Boaz van de Beatz; DJ Snake; Gent & Jawns; Jr Blender; Sonny Moore; MOTi; Picard Brothers; Andrew Swanson; David Taylor; Ticklah; Wiwek

Major Lazer chronology
Apocalypse Soon (2014)	Peace Is the Mission (2015)	Know No Better (2017)

Singles from Peace Is the Mission
- 1. "Lean On" Released: March 2, 2015; 2. "Powerful" Released: September 1, 2015

Professional ratings
Aggregate scores
Source	Rating
Metacritic	68/100
Review scores
Source	Rating
AllMusic	4/5 stars
Billboard	4/5 stars
Clash	7/10
Entertainment Weekly	A−
The Guardian	2/5 stars
Los Angeles Times	2/4 stars
NME	3/5 stars
The Observer	3/5 stars
Pitchfork	7.4/10
Rolling Stone	3.5/5 stars

Peace Is the Mission is the third studio album by American electronic dance music project Major Lazer. It was released on June 1, 2015. The album was preceded by the international hit single "Lean On" with DJ Snake featuring MØ; additionally, the second single "Powerful" featuring Ellie Goulding and Tarrus Riley was released simultaneously with the album.

== Singles ==
The lead single from the album, "Lean On", a collaboration with DJ Snake and Danish singer MØ, was released on March 2, 2015. The track received universally positive reviews and became a massive hit, reaching the top ten in nineteen international charts and topping many others, giving Major Lazer their most internationally successful single to date. The second single from the album, "Powerful", featuring Ellie Goulding and Tarrus Riley was released on September 1, 2015. A preview of the single was revealed on April 23, whilst the whole song was unveiled on May 28. It was added to BBC Radio 1's playlist on 21 June. It reached top 10 in Australia and Poland. The remix of "Light It Up" featuring Nyla & Fuse ODG was released as the third single on the album on 5 November 2015 and became a top 10 hit in UK, Ireland, Belgium, Germany, Netherlands, Denmark, Finland, Norway and Sweden, therefore becoming one of the highest charting Major Lazer singles to date.

=== Promotional singles and other songs ===
Four promotional singles were released; "Roll the Bass" on March 23, 2015, "Night Riders", a collaboration with Travi$ Scott, 2 Chainz, Pusha T and Mad Cobra, released on April 20, 2015, and "Too Original", a collaboration with Elliphant and Jovi Rockwell, released on May 11, 2015. On 2 June 2015, a lyric video was released for "Be Together", a collaboration with Wild Belle, making it the fourth promotional single. On 4 June 2015, a lyric video was released for "Blaze Up the Fire", a collaboration with Chronixx, making it the fifth promotional single.

"All My Love" featuring Ariana Grande was featured on The Hunger Games: Mockingjay, Part 1 – Original Motion Picture Soundtrack prior to the remix that is featured on Peace Is the Mission. On April 27, 2015, Diplo revealed in an interview with Belgian radio station Studio Brussel that they have been working on a track with Belgian singer Selah Sue. He added that it might appear on their next album. Selah Sue herself confirmed this during an interview with Studio Brussels on May 4, 2015. In May 2015, Major Lazer revealed their fourth album would be called Music Is the Weapon.

== Commercial performance ==
Peace Is the Mission debuted at number 12 on the Billboard 200, selling 16,000 copies. It also debuted at number five on the Canadian Albums Chart with 3,500 copies sold. In its second week of sales, the album dropped to number 26 on the US chart, selling 4,000 copies, bringing total sales to 20,000 copies. In its third week of sales, the album dropped to number 34 on the chart, selling 3,000 copies, bringing the total sales to 23,000 copies. In its first month of sales, the album rose up to number 24 on the chart, selling 3,000 copies, bringing the total sales to 26,000 copies. In its fifth week of sales, the album dropped to number 30 on the chart, selling 2,000 copies, bringing total sales to 28,000 copies. In its sixth week of sales, its total sales increased to 32,000 copies. In its seventh week of sales, the total sales increased to 35,000 copies. In its second month of sales, the total sales increased to 37,000 copies. In its fourth week of sales, the album rose to the number 1 spot on the US Dance/Electronic albums chart.

== Track listing ==
Standard edition
No.	Title	Writer(s)	Producer(s)	Length
1.	"Be Together" (featuring Wild Belle)	Thomas Pentz; Wild Belle; Andrew Swanson	Major Lazer; Djemba Djemba	3:53
2.	"Too Original" (featuring Elliphant and Jovi Rockwell)	Pentz; Ellinor Olovsdotter; Joelle Clarke; Philip Meckseper; Tommy Tysper	Major Lazer; Wiwek^{[a]}; Jr Blender^{[a]}	3:27
3.	"Blaze Up the Fire" (featuring Chronixx)	Pentz; Jamar McNaughton Jr.; Meckseper; Leighton Walsh	Major Lazer; Jr Blender	3:34
4.	"Lean On" (with DJ Snake featuring MØ)	Pentz; Karen Marie Ørsted; William Grigahcine; Meckseper; Charles Flores Jr.	Major Lazer; DJ Snake	2:56
5.	"Powerful" (featuring Ellie Goulding and Tarrus Riley)	Pentz; Maxime Picard; Clement Picard; Omar Riley; Ilsey Juber; Fransisca Hall	Major Lazer; Picard Brothers; Skrillex^{[a]}; Switch^{[a]}	3:26
6.	"Light It Up" (featuring Nyla)	Pentz; Nailah Thorbourne; Meckseper; T-Baby; David Alexander Malcolm; Sidney Swift	Major Lazer; Jr. Blender	3:18
7.	"Roll the Bass"	Pentz; Boaz de Jong; Ashanti Reid; Meckseper; Ronald Fritz Jr.	Major Lazer; Boaz van de Beatz	3:46
8.	"Night Riders" (featuring Travis Scott, 2 Chainz, Pusha T and Mad Cobra)	Pentz; Tauheed Epps; Terrence Thornton; Ewart Everett Brown; Jacques Webster II; Theron Thomas; Timothy Thomas; Swanson	Major Lazer; Djemba Djemba	3:53
9.	"All My Love" (remix; featuring Ariana Grande and Machel Montano)	Pentz; Ørsted; de Jong; Meckseper; Ella Yelich-O'Connor; Ariana Grande; Machel Montano; Gamal Doyle	Major Lazer; Boaz van de Beatz; Jr. Blender	3:49
Total length:				32:02

Peace is the Mission: Extended
No.	Title	Writer(s)	Producer(s)	Length
10.	"Light It Up" (remix; featuring Nyla and Fuse ODG)	Pentz; Thorbourne; Nana Abiona; Meckseper; T-Baby; Malcolm; Swift	Major Lazer; Jr. Blender	2:46
11.	"Boom" (featuring MOTi, Ty Dolla $ign, Wizkid and Kranium)	Pentz; Meckseper; Timo Romme; Kemar Donaldson; Tyrone Griffin Jr.; Ayodeji Balogun	Major Lazer; Jr. Blender; MOTi	3:06
12.	"Wave" (featuring Kali Uchis)	Pentz; Meckseper; Karly Loaiza; Victor Axelrod	Major Lazer; Jr. Blender; Ticklah	3:09
13.	"Thunder & Lightning" (featuring Gent & Jawns)	Pentz; Meckseper; William Bennett; Long Phung; Clifton Gibbs; Coxsone Dodd	Major Lazer; Jr. Blender; Gent & Jawns	3:57
14.	"Lost" (featuring MØ)	Frank Ocean; James Ho; Micah Otano	Major Lazer; Jr. Blender	3:15
Total length:				48:15

Peace is the Mission: Remixes
No.	Title	Writer(s)	Producer(s)	Length
1.	"Be Together" (Cut Snake remix; featuring Wild Belle)	Pentz; Swanson; E. Bergman; N. Bergman	Major Lazer; Djemba Djemba; Cut Snake	5:52
2.	"Be Together" (LIOHN remix; featuring Wild Belle)	Pentz; Swanson; E. Bergman; N. Bergman	Major Lazer; Djemba Djemba; LIOHN	3:30
3.	"Too Original" (TJR remix; featuring Elliphant and Jovi Rockwell)	Pentz; Meckseper; Olovsdotter; Clarke	Major Lazer; Wiwek^{[a]}; Jr. Blender^{[a]}; TJR	3:20
4.	"Blaze Up the Fire" (Rocky Wellstack remix; featuring Chronixx)	Pentz; Meckseper; McNaughton Jr.; Walsh	Major Lazer; Jr. Blender; Rocky Wellstack	3:18
5.	"Lean On" (J Balvin and Farruko remix; with DJ Snake featuring MØ)	Pentz; Meckseper; Ørsted; William Grigahcine; José Álvaro Osorio Balvin; Carlos Efrén Reyes Rosado	Major Lazer; DJ Snake	3:51
6.	"Lean On" (Dillon Francis & Jauz remix; with DJ Snake featuring MØ)	Pentz; Meckseper; Ørsted; Grigahcine	Major Lazer; DJ Snake; Dillon Francis; Jauz	4:38
7.	"Powerful" (DRAM remix; featuring Ellie Goulding and Tarrus Riley)	Pentz; M. Picard; C. Picard; Juber; Hall; Riley; Shelley Marshaun Massenburg-Smith	Major Lazer; Picard Brothers; Skrillex^{[a]}; Switch^{[a]}	3:40
8.	"Powerful" (Gregor Salto remix; featuring Ellie Goulding and Tarrus Riley)	Pentz; M. Picard; C. Picard; Juber; Hall; Riley	Major Lazer; Picard Brothers; Skrillex^{[a]}; Switch^{[a]}; Gregor Salto	4:35
9.	"Light it Up" (Quintino remix; featuring Nyla)	Pentz; Meckseper; Thorbourne; Swift; T-Baby; Malcolm	Major Lazer; Jr. Blender; Quintino	3:50
10.	"Roll the Bass" (Happy Colors remix)	Pentz; Meckseper; Jong; Fritz Jr.; Reid	Major Lazer; Boaz van de Beatz; Happy Colors	3:13
11.	"Night Riders" (Cesqueax remix; featuring Travi$ Scott, 2 Chainz, Pusha T and Mad Cobra)	Pentz; Swanson; Webster; Epps; Thornton; Brown	Major Lazer; Djemba Djemba; Cesqeaux	3:06
12.	"Night Riders" (Neo Fresco Remix; featuring Travi$ Scott, 2 Chainz, Pusha T and Mad Cobra)	Pentz; Swanson; Webster; Epps; Thornton; Brown	Major Lazer; Djemba Djemba; Neo Fresco	4:17
Total length:				47:10

=== Notes ===
- ^{^[a]} signifies an additional producer.
- "Roll the Bass" contains uncredited vocals performed by Taranchyla (Ashanti Reid) and Randy Valentine (Ronald Fritz Jr).
- "Thunder & Lightning" contains samples of the 1989 song "Brimstone & Fire" by Clifton Gibbs and the Selected Few.
- "Lost" is a cover of the Frank Ocean song of the same name.

== Personnel ==
Credits were adapted from AllMusic.

- Dark Art – mixing
- Boaz van de Beatz – instrumentation, mixing, producer, programming
- Jr. Blender – additional production, instrumentation, mixing, producer, programming
- 2 Chainz – vocals (track 8)
- Chronixx – vocals (track 3);
- Mad Cobra – vocals (track 8)
- Rich Costey – mixing
- Diplo – instrumentation, producer, programming
- Elliphant – vocals (track 2)
- Ellie Goulding – engineer, vocals (track 5)
- Ariana Grande – vocals (track 9)
- Tom Hough – vocal engineer
- JSTJR – programming
- Manny Marroquin – mixing
- Philip Meckseper – engineer
- Machel Montano – vocals (track 9)
- Sonny Moore – additional production, guitar, programming
- MØ – vocals (track 4)
- Nyla – vocals (track 6, 10)
- Picard Brothers – guitar, producer, programming
- Ricky Remedy – instrumentation, mixing
- Tarrus Riley – engineer, vocals (track 5)
- Todd Robinson – mixing assistant
- Jovi Rockwell – vocals (track 2)
- Anthony Rotella – mixing
- James Royo – mixing
- Travi$ Scott – vocals (track 8)
- DJ Snake – producer
- Andrew Swanson – producer, programming
- Pusha T – vocals (track 8)
- David Taylor – additional production, mixing
- Ticklah – instrumentation
- Walshy Fire – vocals
- Wild Belle – vocals (track 1), instrumentation
- Wiwek – additional production, programming

== Charts ==
=== Weekly charts ===
Chart (2015–16)	Peak position
Australian Albums (ARIA)	5
Austrian Albums (Ö3 Austria)	32
Belgian Albums (Ultratop Flanders)	9
Belgian Albums (Ultratop Wallonia)	23
Danish Albums (Hitlisten)	7
Dutch Albums (Album Top 100)	13
Finnish Albums (Suomen virallinen lista)	3
French Albums (SNEP)	11
German Albums (Offizielle Top 100)	40
Irish Albums (IRMA)	84
Italian Albums (FIMI)	26
New Zealand Albums (RMNZ)	17
Norwegian Albums (VG-lista)	8
Scottish Albums (Official Charts)	30
Spanish Albums (Promusicae)	71
Swedish Albums (Sverigetopplistan)	4
Swiss Albums (Schweizer Hitparade)	11
UK Albums (Official Charts)	25
UK Independent Albums (Official Charts)	3
US Billboard 200	12
US Top Dance Albums (Billboard)	1
US Independent Albums (Billboard)	3

=== Year-end charts ===
Chart (2015)	Position
Australian Albums (ARIA)	83
Belgian Albums (Ultratop Flanders)	111
Belgian Albums (Ultratop Wallonia)	181
Danish Albums (Hitlisten)	40
French Albums (SNEP)	174
Swedish Albums (Sverigetopplistan)	31
US Billboard 200	87
US Independent Albums (Billboard)	33
US Top Dance/Electronic Albums (Billboard)	7
Chart (2016)	Position
Australian Dance Albums (ARIA)	27
Belgian Albums (Ultratop Flanders)	173
Danish Albums (Hitlisten)	13
Dutch Albums (MegaCharts)	44
Swedish Albums (Sverigetopplistan)	14
US Billboard 200	120
US Top Dance/Electronic Albums (Billboard)	8
Chart (2017)	Position
Danish Albums (Hitlisten)	97
Swedish Albums (Sverigetopplistan)	91
US Top Dance/Electronic Albums (Billboard)	9
Chart (2018)	Position
US Top Dance/Electronic Albums (Billboard)	13

== Certifications ==
Region	Certification	Certified units/sales
Denmark (IFPI Danmark)	3× Platinum	60,000^{‡}
France (SNEP)	Platinum	100,000^{‡}
Italy (FIMI)	Gold	25,000^{‡}
New Zealand (RMNZ)	3× Platinum	45,000^{‡}
Norway (IFPI Norway)	Gold	15,000^{‡}
Sweden (GLF)	Gold	20,000^{‡}
United Kingdom (BPI)	Gold	100,000^{‡}
United States (RIAA)	Gold	500,000^{‡}
^{‡} Sales+streaming figures based on certification alone.
