= Powerful (song) =

Single by Major Lazer featuring Ellie Goulding and Tarrus Riley

from the album Peace Is the Mission
- Released: September 1, 2015
- Length: 3:26
- Label: Mad Decent; Because
- Songwriters: Diplo; Maxime Picard; Clement Picard; Ilsey Juber; Fran Hall; Tarrus Riley
- Producers: Major Lazer; Picard Brothers

Major Lazer singles chronology
"Lean On" (2015)	"Powerful" (2015)	"Lost" (2015)

Ellie Goulding singles chronology
"Love Me like You Do" (2015)	"Powerful" (2015)	"On My Mind" (2015)

Music video
- "Powerful" on YouTube

"Powerful" is a song recorded by American electronic music project Major Lazer. It is the second official single off their third studio album, Peace Is the Mission (2015), featuring guest vocals from English singer Ellie Goulding and Jamaican singer Tarrus Riley. The song was initially planned to be the lead single from the album but was scrapped in favor of "Lean On".

== Composition ==
The song is described as an "EDM power ballad" and its soul, pop and R&B nature led the critics to label it as one of the most accessible and radio friendly songs in the album. It was written by Thomas Pentz, Maxime Picard, Clement Picard, Ilsey Juber, Fran Hall and reggae musician Tarrus Riley; the latter is also featured on the track along singer Ellie Goulding. The song is a musical departure from Major Lazer's dancehall-inspired signature sound, having this song dubbed as a ballad by many reporters.

== Music video ==
The music video was released on July 23, 2015. It features both Goulding and Riley performing their parts using telekinetic powers and ruining a small diner. The clip's theme is labeled as "supernatural" and was directed by James Slater.

== Use in media ==
In 2017, the song was used in an advertisement for Emporio Armani's Stronger With You and Because It's You perfumes. On November 4, 2019, episode of the reality television singing competition show The Voice, team Gwen (Stefani) member Jacob "Jake" HaldenVang performed a rock arrangement of the song in a Knockout round, opposing fellow Team Gwen member Royce Lovett. Coaches Kelly Clarkson, John Legend, and Blake Shelton all preferred HaldenVang's performance, and Stefani agreed, naming him the winner of the Knockout and advancing him to the Live Playoffs.

== Track listing ==
Digital download
No.	Title	Length
1.	"Powerful" (featuring Ellie Goulding and Tarrus Riley)	3:26

Digital download – remixes - EP
No.	Title	Length
1.	"Powerful" (featuring Ellie Goulding and Tarrus Riley)	3:26
2.	"Powerful" (featuring Ellie Goulding and Tarrus Riley) (With You. x GITCHII remix)	4:03
3.	"Powerful" (featuring Ellie Goulding and Tarrus Riley) (Gregor Salto remix)	4:34
4.	"Powerful" (featuring Ellie Goulding and Tarrus Riley) (Michael Calfan remix)	2:55
5.	"Powerful" (featuring Ellie Goulding and Tarrus Riley) (BOXINBOX & Lionsize remix)	3:48
6.	"Powerful" (featuring Ellie Goulding and Tarrus Riley) (G-Buck remix)	4:06

== Charts ==
=== Weekly charts ===
Chart (2015)	Peak position
Australia (ARIA)	7
Australia Dance (ARIA)	1
Austria (Ö3 Austria Top 40)	55
Belgium (Ultratop 50 Flanders)	30
Belgium (Ultratop 50 Wallonia)	33
Canada Hot 100 (Billboard)	64
Czech Republic Airplay (ČNS IFPI)	10
Czech Republic Singles Digital (ČNS IFPI)	47
Denmark (Tracklisten)	39
France (SNEP)	78
Germany (GfK)	90
Hungary (Single Top 40)	31
Hungary (Stream Top 40)	32
Ireland (IRMA)	77
Italy (FIMI)	31
Netherlands (Dutch Top 40)	31
Netherlands (Single Top 100)	73
New Zealand (Recorded Music NZ)	20
Poland Airplay (ZPAV)	7
Poland (Polish Airplay New)	1
Poland (Video Chart)	5
Scottish Singles Sales (Official Charts)	93
Slovakia Airplay (ČNS IFPI)	50
Switzerland (Schweizer Hitparade)	53
UK Indie (Official Charts)	3
UK Singles (Official Charts)	54
US Billboard Hot 100	83
US Pop Airplay (Billboard)	22
US Hot Dance/Electronic Songs (Billboard)	5

=== Year-end charts ===
Chart (2015)	Position
Australia (ARIA)	68
Poland (ZPAV)	43
US Hot Dance/Electronic Songs (Billboard)	21

== Certifications ==
Region	Certification	Certified units/sales
Australia (ARIA)	2× Platinum	140,000^{‡}
Denmark (IFPI Danmark)	Gold	30,000^{^}
Italy (FIMI)	Platinum	50,000^{‡}
New Zealand (RMNZ)	Platinum	15,000^{*}
United Kingdom (BPI)	Silver	200,000^{‡}
United States (RIAA)	Gold	500,000^{‡}
^{*} Sales figures based on certification alone.^{^} Shipments figures based on certification alone.^{‡} Sales+streaming figures based on certification alone.

== Release history ==
Release history
Region	Date	Format(s)	Label	Ref.
United States	September 1, 2015	Contemporary hit radio	Mad Decent; Interscope	
