= The Tellers =

Belgian rock band

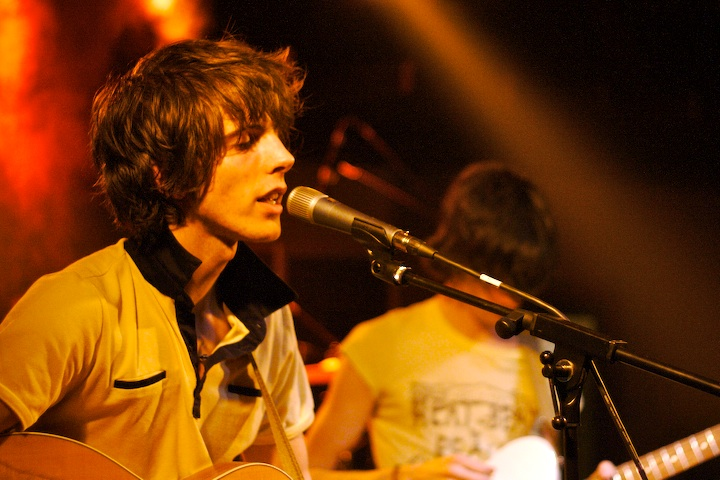

Background information
- Origin: Wallonia, Belgium
- Genres: Alternative rock, Indie folk
- Years active: 2005 - present
- Members: Ben Bailleux-Beynon (lead singer, guitar); Fabrice Detry (bass); Cesar Laloux (drums); Joos Houwen (guitar)

The Tellers are a rock group from Wallonia, Belgium.

Benoît "Ben" Baillieux-Beynon was born to a Welsh mother from Cardiff, from whom he got his accent. He started the band in 2005, originally paired up with Nic Van Assche. Van Assche was then replaced by Charles Blistin. In 2006 they recorded the More EP. The band rapidly gained popularity. Their first full-length album, 'Hands Full of Ink,' was released at the end of 2007 and was followed by an intensive European tour. At the same time, the Tellers added band members Kenley Dratwa (drums) and Francis Gustin (bass).

After a two-year tour with this ensemble, the band split, reverting to its original duo. Soon after, members Beynon and Blistin parted amicably. Beynon soon added three new members to the band: Fabrice Detry (bass), Cesar Laloux (drums), and Joos Houwen (guitar).

Although the band only emerged recently, (having released two albums), the group has achieved fame in Belgium, where their album Hands full of ink reached 7th in the charts. They have also had success in Germany, the Netherlands and most recently in France in part due to advertising for Canon.

The song More was included in the soundtrack of EA Sports game, FIFA 08 and was featured in an ANZ Bank advertisement in Australia.

They recorded their EP in the studio of 62TV Records (home of Girls in Hawaii).

== Discography ==
=== Albums ===
The Tellers

More (2006) EP

1. More
2. Girls of Russia
3. Second Category
4. I Lie
5. Jacknife
6. Turn Back Around
7. This World

Hands full of ink (2007)

1. Die With Me / If I Say
2. More
3. Want You Back
4. Penny
5. Confess
6. Darkest Door
7. Prince Charly
8. Too Doo
9. Hugo
10. He Gets High
11. A Bit Of Glue
12. Second Category
13. Memory
14. Holiness / Saintete
15. Me Boy
16. Another Coin For...

Close the Evil Eye (2010)

1. Drama
2. Evil Eye
3. Like I Say
4. Secrets
5. Silent Hills
6. Salt
7. Cold as Ice
8. I've Got A World
9. Friends Of Mine
10. I Wish
11. 7 Words

=== Singles ===
- 2006 : More
- 2006 : Second Category
- 2007 : Hugo
- 2007 : If I say
- 2007 : Memory
- 2008 : Holiness (featuring Coby-Rae)
- 2010 : Like I say / Cold as Ice
- 2010 : I've Got A World
