= Lean On =

Single by Major Lazer and DJ Snake featuring MØ

from the album Peace Is the Mission
- Released: March 2, 2015
- Recorded: 2014: Amsterdam; Hamburg
- Genre: EDM; electronic; moombahton
- Length: 2:57
- Label: Mad Decent
- Songwriters: Karen Marie Ørsted; Thomas Pentz; William Grigahcine; Philip Meckseper; Martin Bresso
- Producers: Major Lazer; DJ Snake

Major Lazer singles chronology
"We Make It Bounce" (2014)	"Lean On" (2015)	"Powerful" (2015)

DJ Snake singles chronology
"You Know You Like It" (2014)	"Lean On" (2015)	"Middle" (2015)

MØ singles chronology
"Beg for It" (2014)	"Lean On" (2015)	"Lost" (2015)

Alternative cover
- Remixes cover

Music video
- "Lean On" on YouTube

Alternative cover
- Alfa version cover

Music video
- "Lean On" on YouTube

"Lean On" is a song by American electronic dance music group Major Lazer and French DJ and record producer DJ Snake featuring Danish singer MØ. It was released on March 2, 2015, as the lead single from Major Lazer's third studio album, Peace Is the Mission (2015). It was written by MØ, Diplo, DJ Snake, Tchami, and Jr Blender, and produced by Major Lazer and DJ Snake. It is an EDM, electronic and moombahton song.

"Lean On" was a critical and commercial success, peaking at number four on the US Billboard Hot 100 and number two on the UK Singles Chart. It reached number one in several other countries including Argentina, Australia, Denmark, Finland, Ireland, the Netherlands, New Zealand, Mexico, and Switzerland; as well as the top 10 in Austria, Belgium, Canada, Colombia, France, Israel, Italy, Norway, Poland, Spain, and Sweden. In November 2015, "Lean On" was named by Spotify as the most streamed song of all time, and had over 1 billion streams globally in June 2017; however, in 2016, it was later overtaken by Drake's "One Dance" (which was overtaken again by Ed Sheeran's Shape of You that was overtaken by The Weeknd's Blinding Lights).

The accompanying music video for "Lean On" was filmed in ND Studios, Karjat, Kaul Heritage City, in Vasai in Maharashtra, India and in the Golden Hall at Stockholm City Hall. The video premiered on March 22, 2015, and has over 3.8 billion views on YouTube as of September 2025. According to IFPI, "Lean On" was the fifth best-selling song of 2015 worldwide, and one of the best-selling singles of all time, with global sales of 13.1 million.

On 22 February 2026, a new version was released which features a new verse from Italian singer and rapper Alfa on the day of the closing ceremony of the Milan / Cortina Olympic Winter Games and was performed live at the Verona Arena in Verona, Italy.

== Background and composition ==
Regarding the creative process behind "Lean On", producer Diplo of Major Lazer said, "We wrote this song with MØ very early from an instrumental Jr Blender created in some sessions in Trinidad. It was a strong hook. Very big to me but the production was lacking an attitude we needed. A year later I remixed the song at a completely different tempo and asked DJ Snake for a signature post chorus. After he did his thing, me, MØ and Blender rewrote the song at the new tempo in Las Vegas and made something very unique that became our album's lead-off single. We're super proud of this song." Diplo offered a slower reggae arrangement of the song to Rihanna, who rejected it. He also offered said arrangement of the song to Nicki Minaj, who turned it down as well. Diplo called this turn of events "a blessing in disguise," and that "MØ sounds better than anybody was going to sound on that record."

== Critical reception ==
The song has received critical acclaim. Brennan Carley of Spin wrote, "It's as if No Doubt met the C+C Music Factory". Consequence of Sound's Michelle Geslani called the song a "bouncy banger" and complimented MØ's "siren-like" vocals. David Jeffries from AllMusic praised MØ and DJ Snake for helping the track "deliver the sentimental lyrics and sensual house music at an intoxicating half-speed tempo." Billboard's Matt Medved praised the song, explaining, "Lean On" gives Major Lazer’s reggae, trap and moombahton blend a pop gloss. Already a festival favorite, it looks primed to follow Jack Ü and Justin Bieber's "Where Are Ü Now" as another Diplo product that both innovates and finds crossover appeal."

Rolling Stone ranked "Lean On" at number 48 on its year-end list to find the 50 best songs of 2015, while Billboard listed it number one on its Top 10 Dance/Electronic songs of 2015. The latter magazine also ranked "Lean On" at number 3 on its year-end critics' poll for 2015: "The Grammys got it wrong. It's rare that a dance record of this quality reaches this level of ubiquity—after all, this is Spotify's most streamed song of all-time as of Nov. 2015. Despite being independently released, the infectious three-minute single became the poster child for dance crossover, dominating both radio and festival play and hitting No. 4 on the Hot 100. By Billboard's measure, 'Lean On' was the dance/electronic song of the year." The prestigious Village Voice ranked "Lean On" at number 25 on their annual year-end critic's poll. On January 26, 2016, "Lean On" reached #3 on Triple J's Hottest 100 of 2015.

== Commercial performance ==
"Lean On" was a global commercial success. In the United States, "Lean On" debuted at the bottom of the Billboard Hot 100 on the issue dated April 25, 2015. The song later reached number four on August 29, 2015, spending 10 consecutive weeks in the top-10. This entry makes it Major Lazer and MØ's highest-charting hit in the country at the time making Major Lazer's first top 10 and top 40, also making MØ's first top 10 and second top 40 ("Cold Water", a collaboration with Justin Bieber, reached number two in 2016); "Lean On" also ties with DJ Snake's "Turn Down for What", which also reached number four in June 2014.

In the United Kingdom, "Lean On" debuted at number 38 on the UK Singles Chart on the week ending April 11, 2015. The song entered the top-10 three weeks later, before reaching number two on June 27, 2015. The song spent 12 non-consecutive weeks in the top 10, becoming one of the few songs during 2015 to spend more than 10 weeks in the top 10 (even above several number-one singles). Elsewhere, in Australia, Denmark, Finland, Hungary, Ireland, New Zealand, and Norway, "Lean On" reached number one. Additionally, the single reached number 3 on the Canadian Hot 100.

In November 2015, "Lean On" was announced to have overtaken "Thinking Out Loud" by Ed Sheeran as the most streamed song ever on Spotify, with 526 million streams globally. It currently has over 2.4 billion streams on the site, making it the ninetieth most streamed song.

== Music video and lyric video ==
=== Music video ===
The accompanying music video for "Lean On" was directed by Tim Erem, produced by Mikhail Mehra, Akshay Multani & Per Welen, director of photography Jacob Møller. It was shot at ND Studios, Karjat, and Kaul Heritage City, Vasai in Maharashtra, India. Some scenes of the video are filmed in the Golden Hall of the Stockholm City Hall. It follows a premise of Major Lazer, MØ and DJ Snake engaging in modernised Bollywood dance sequences. It was inspired by a previous tour Major Lazer embarked on in the country. Speaking about the music video, Major Lazer member Diplo said:

"When we toured there [in India] as Major Lazer, it was mind-blowing to see our fan-base and we wanted to incorporate the attitude and positive vibes into our video and just do something that embodies the essence of Major Lazer. Major Lazer has always been a culture mashup and to us, India feels like some kind of special creature with one foot in history and one firmly in the future."

The video premiered on March 22, 2015, and has 3.8 billion views on YouTube as of September 2025, making it the 32nd most viewed video on the site.

In January 2022, MØ commented, "The video is so beautiful and amazing, but I definitely think it's cultural appropriation, for sure. And I'm so happy that people were making me aware of it, because, at the time, I didn't really understand."

=== Lyric video ===
The lyric video for "Lean On" was uploaded on YouTube on March 2, 2015.

== Remixes ==
On July 10, 2015, the official EP of remixes was released for digital download. The EP consists of seven remixes.

=== Ty Dolla Sign remix ===
The official remix of "Lean On" features a guest appearance by American singer Ty Dolla Sign. It was premiered through Major Lazer's SoundCloud on June 17, 2015. Ty Dolla Sign starts the remix with his new verse while the rest of the song is the same as in the original version.

The remix was well received by music critics. Zach Frydenlund of Complex wrote; "While the song was already catchy as hell, Ty Dolla adds another element to the single". Rap-Up also gave a positive review to the remix with writing that Ty Dolla Sign starts the song with "electrifying verse that is guaranteed to get you lit". Elias Leight of The Fader wrote that Ty Dolla Sign added "some extra juice" to the song with his verse.

== Track listing ==
Digital download
No.	Title	Length
1.	"Lean On" (with DJ Snake featuring MØ)	2:56

Digital download (Remixes)
No.	Title	Length
1.	"Lean On" (Dillon Francis and Jauz Remix) (with DJ Snake featuring MØ)	4:38
2.	"Lean On" (CRNKN Remix) (with DJ Snake featuring MØ)	3:24
3.	"Lean On" (Ephwurd and ETC!ETC! Remix) (with DJ Snake featuring MØ) (US non-enter)	3:18
4.	"Lean On" (Fono Remix) (with DJ Snake featuring MØ)	5:09
5.	"Lean On" (Malaa Remix) (with DJ Snake featuring MØ)	6:17
6.	"Lean On" (Moska Remix) (with DJ Snake featuring MØ)	4:07

Digital download (Remixes Vol. 2)
No.	Title	Length
1.	"Lean On" (J Balvin and Farruko Remix)	3:51
2.	"Lean On" (Tiësto and MOTi Remix) (with DJ Snake featuring MØ)	4:56

== Charts ==
=== Weekly charts ===
Weekly chart performance for "Lean On"
Chart (2015–2016)	Peak position
Argentina (Monitor Latino)	1
Australia (ARIA)	1
Australia Dance (ARIA)	1
Austria (Ö3 Austria Top 40)	3
Belgium (Ultratop 50 Flanders)	2
Belgium (Ultratop 50 Wallonia)	3
Brazil (Billboard Brasil Hot 100)	57
Canada Hot 100 (Billboard)	3
Colombia (National-Report)	9
Croatia International Airplay (HRT)	1
Czech Republic Airplay (ČNS IFPI)	3
Czech Republic Singles Digital (ČNS IFPI)	1
Denmark (Tracklisten)	1
Euro Digital Song Sales (Billboard)	3
Finland (Suomen virallinen lista)	1
France (SNEP)	2
France Airplay (SNEP)	1
Germany (Offizielle Deutsche Charts)	4
Greece Digital (Billboard)	1
Hungary (Dance Top 40)	1
Hungary (Rádiós Top 40)	1
Hungary (Single Top 40)	2
Iceland (RÚV)	1
Ireland (IRMA)	1
Israel International Airplay (Media Forest)	6
Italy (FIMI)	3
Lebanon (Lebanese Top 20)	1
Luxembourg Digital Song Sales (Billboard)	1
Mexico (Billboard Ingles Airplay)	1
Mexico Anglo (Monitor Latino)	1
Netherlands (Dutch Top 40)	1
Netherlands (Single Top 100)	1
Netherlands Dance (Dance Top 30)	1
New Zealand (Recorded Music NZ)	1
Norway (VG-lista)	3
Poland Airplay (ZPAV)	2
Romania Airplay (Media Forest)	2
Romania TV Airplay (Media Forest)	1
Russia Airplay (TopHit)	1
Scottish Singles Sales (Official Charts)	7
Slovakia Airplay (ČNS IFPI)	1
Slovakia Singles Digital (ČNS IFPI)	1
Slovenia (SloTop50)	8
South Africa Airplay (EMA)	5
South Korea International (Gaon)	29
Spain (PROMUSICAE)	2
Sweden (Sverigetopplistan)	2
Switzerland (Schweizer Hitparade)	1
Ukraine Airplay (TopHit)	12
UK Singles (Official Charts)	2
UK Dance (Official Charts)	1
UK Indie (Official Charts)	1
US Billboard Hot 100	4
US Adult Pop Airplay (Billboard)	19
US Dance Club Songs (Billboard)	18
US Hot Dance/Electronic Songs (Billboard)	1
US Latin Pop Airplay (Billboard)	19
US Pop Airplay (Billboard)	1
US Rhythmic Airplay (Billboard)	2

2025–2026 weekly chart performance for "Lean On"
Chart (2025–2026)	Peak position
Estonia Airplay (TopHit)	74
Global 200 (Billboard)	123
Lithuania (AGATA)	79
Slovakia Singles Digital (ČNS IFPI)	80
UK Dance (OCC)	16

=== Monthly charts ===
Monthly chart performance for "Lean On"
Chart (2015)	Peak position
CIS Airplay (TopHit)	2
Russia Airplay (TopHit)	2
Ukraine Airplay (TopHit)	16

=== Year-end charts ===
2015 year-end chart performance for "Lean On"
Chart (2015)	Position
Australia (ARIA)	6
Australia Dance (ARIA)	2
Austria (Ö3 Austria Top 40)	4
Belgium (Ultratop 50 Flanders)	7
Belgium Dance (Ultratop Flanders)	2
Belgium (Ultratop 50 Wallonia)	6
Belgium Dance (Ultratop Wallonia)	2
Canada (Canadian Hot 100)	9
CIS Airplay (TopHit)	7
Denmark (Tracklisten)	1
France (SNEP)	2
Germany (Official German Charts)	5
Hungary (Dance Top 40)	9
Hungary (Rádiós Top 40)	7
Hungary (Single Top 40)	10
Ireland (IRMA)	3
Israel Airplay (Media Forest)	8
Italy (FIMI)	5
Netherlands (Dutch Top 40)	1
Netherlands (Single Top 100)	2
Netherlands Dance (Dance Top 30)	1
New Zealand (Recorded Music NZ)	2
Poland (ZPAV)	8
Russia Airplay (TopHit)	6
Spain (PROMUSICAE)	3
Sweden (Sverigetopplistan)	1
Switzerland (Schweizer Hitparade)	3
Ukraine Airplay (TopHit)	46
UK Singles (Official Charts Company)	7
US Billboard Hot 100	16
US Hot Dance/Electronic Songs (Billboard)	1
US Mainstream Top 40 (Billboard)	8
US Rhythmic (Billboard)	23

2016 year-end chart performance for "Lean On"
Chart (2016)	Position
Argentina (Monitor Latino)	49
Australia (ARIA)	86
Belgium (Ultratop 50 Wallonia)	86
Canada (Canadian Hot 100)	52
CIS Airplay (TopHit)	119
Denmark (Tracklisten)	72
France (SNEP)	37
Hungary (Dance Top 40)	22
Hungary (Rádiós Top 40)	72
Italy (FIMI)	60
Netherlands (Single Top 100)	73
Russia Airplay (TopHit)	130
Spain (PROMUSICAE)	60
Switzerland (Schweizer Hitparade)	46
Ukraine Airplay (TopHit)	108
UK Singles (Official Charts Company)	92
US Billboard Hot 100	85
US Hot Dance/Electronic Songs (Billboard)	10

2017 year-end chart performance for "Lean On"
Chart (2017)	Position
France (SNEP)	163

2024 year-end chart performance for "Lean On"
Chart (2024)	Position
Estonia Airplay (TopHit)	185
Hungary (Rádiós Top 40)	52

=== Decade-end charts ===
Chart (2010–2019)	Position
Australia (ARIA)	60
CIS Airplay (TopHit)	91
Germany (Official German Charts)	38
Netherlands (Single Top 100)	16
Russia Airplay (TopHit)	77
UK Singles (Official Charts Company)	49
US Hot Dance/Electronic Songs (Billboard)	5

== Certifications ==
Region	Certification	Certified units/sales
Australia (ARIA)	10× Platinum	700,000^{‡}
Austria (IFPI Austria)	Platinum	30,000^{‡}
Belgium (BRMA)	3× Platinum	60,000^{‡}
Brazil (Pro-Música Brasil)	3× Platinum	180,000^{‡}
Canada (Music Canada)	2× Platinum	160,000^{*}
Denmark (IFPI Danmark)	5× Platinum	450,000^{‡}
France (SNEP)	Diamond	333,333^{‡}
Germany (BVMI)	2× Platinum	800,000^{‡}
Italy (FIMI)	7× Platinum	350,000^{‡}
Japan (RIAJ)	Gold	100,000^{*}
Netherlands (NVPI)	Platinum	30,000^{‡}
New Zealand (RMNZ)	7× Platinum	210,000^{‡}
Norway (IFPI Norway)	3× Platinum	120,000^{‡}
Poland (ZPAV)	Platinum	20,000^{‡}
Portugal (AFP)	Gold	5,000^{‡}
Spain (Promusicae) Including J Balvin & Farruko Remix	5× Platinum	200,000^{‡}
Sweden (GLF)	6× Platinum	240,000^{‡}
Switzerland (IFPI Switzerland)	2× Platinum	60,000^{‡}
United Kingdom (BPI)	5× Platinum	3,000,000^{‡}
United States (RIAA)	Diamond	10,000,000^{‡}
Streaming
Japan (RIAJ)	Gold	50,000,000^{†}
^{*} Sales figures based on certification alone.^{‡} Sales+streaming figures based on certification alone.^{†} Streaming-only figures based on certification alone.

== Release history ==
Country	Date	Format	Label
Worldwide	March 2, 2015	Digital download	Mad Decent

== See also ==
- List of best-selling singles in Australia
- List of most-viewed YouTube videos
