= Be Together (Major Lazer song) =

Promotional single by Major Lazer featuring Wild Belle

from the album Peace Is the Mission
- Released: October 28, 2015
- Studio: Sandhill Sound (Chicago)
- Genre: EDM; pop rock; R&B
- Length: 3:54
- Songwriters: Thomas Pentz; Andrew Swanson; Elliot Bergman; Natalie Bergman
- Producers: Major Lazer; Djemba Djemba

"Be Together" is a song recorded by American music group Major Lazer featuring fellow American music group Wild Belle, as the opening track of the former's third studio album, Peace Is the Mission (2015). It is also Major Lazer's fourth promotional single. The song may have risen to prominence when trap artist Vanic released a remix of a song to his SoundCloud account, and has since been featured on numerous EDM records and channels.

On November 20, 2015, Major Lazer released the Australazer EP, which features six remixes of "Be Together" by various Australian EDM artists. The official music video was published on January 19, 2016, through Major Lazer's official YouTube channel.

== Charts ==
=== Weekly charts ===
| Chart (2015) | Peak position |
|---|---|
| Australia (ARIA) | 33 |
| France (SNEP) | 150 |
| US Hot Dance/Electronic Songs (Billboard) | 29 |

=== Year-end charts ===
| Chart (2015) | Position |
|---|---|
| US Hot Dance/Electronic Songs (Billboard) | 62 |

== Certifications ==
| Region | Certification | Certified units/sales |
|---|---|---|
| New Zealand (RMNZ) | Gold | 15,000^{‡} |
^{‡} Sales+streaming figures based on certification alone.
