= All My Love (Major Lazer song) =

2014 single by Major Lazer

Song by Major Lazer featuring Ariana Grande

from the album The Hunger Games: Mockingjay, Part 1
- Released: 13 November 2014
- Studio: Air Lyndhurst (London)
- Genre: Electropop; dance-pop
- Length: 3:32
- Label: Republic
- Songwriters: Ella Yelich-O'Connor; Ariana Grande; Karen Ørsted; Thomas Pentz; Boaz de Jong; Philip Meckseper
- Producers: Diplo; Boaz van de Beatz; Jr Blender

"All My Love" is a song by American electronic music project Major Lazer featuring vocals from American singer Ariana Grande. It was released on 13 November 2014 as the fifth song from the soundtrack for The Hunger Games: Mockingjay – Part 1 (2014). The song was written by Grande, Lorde, and MØ with production handled by Boaz van de Beatz, Jr Blender and Diplo. It is an electropop and dance-pop song with elements of dancehall. "All My Love" received positive reviews from music critics who complimented the track's production.

Commercially, the track performed modestly in Belgium and charted in France and the United Kingdom. A remix of the song featuring vocals from Grande and Trinidadian singer Machel Montano was released on 21 January 2015 and appears as the final track on Major Lazer's third studio album Peace Is the Mission (2015). It features an interpolation of Aqua's 1997 song "Lollipop (Candyman)". This version performed modestly in Belgium and charted in Canada. Grande performed the original version on select dates on The Honeymoon Tour (2015).

== Background and release ==
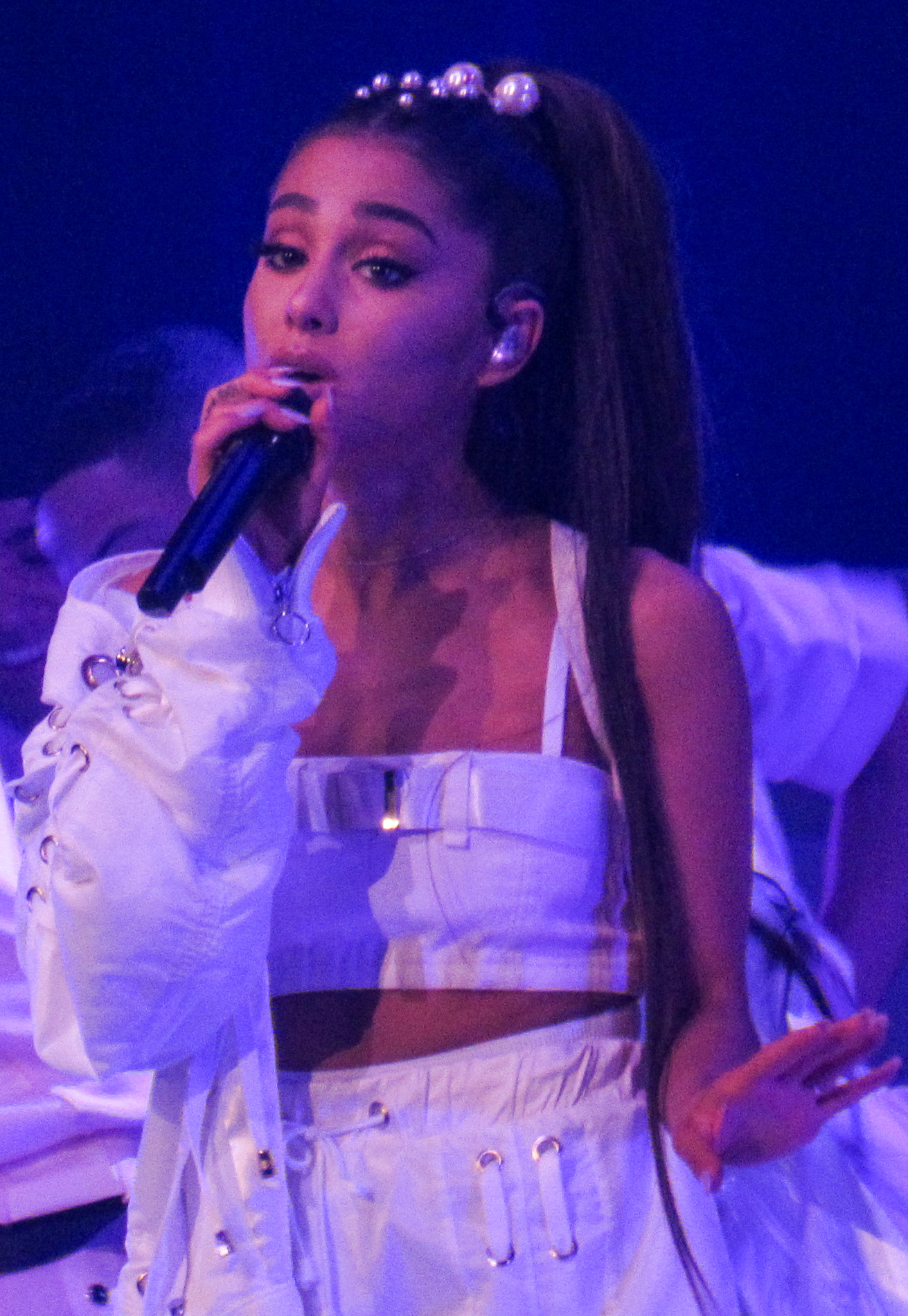
Ariana Grande co-wrote and contributed vocals to "All My Love"

"All My Love" was written by Lorde (credited under her birth-name Ella Yelich-O'Connor), Ariana Grande and MØ (credited under her birth-name Karen Ørsted), while production of the song was handled by Boaz van de Beatz, Jr Blender and Diplo, a member of Major Lazer. Lorde's desire to include "All My Love" on the film's soundtrack led Diplo to rush the production process of the song. In an annotation posted to Genius that Diplo wrote, he mentioned that he was on vacation in London at the same time Grande was there. He managed to communicate with her and go "back and forth with certain mixes." Diplo said that he was willing to "screw around" and surprise people with "this kind of collaboration."

Leaked on 13 November 2014 before the official release date, "All My Love" was included as the fifth track for the soundtrack of the 2014 film The Hunger Games: Mockingjay – Part 1. Diplo first mentioned the track on 16 October 2014 via Twitter. However, he deleted the tweet afterwards. When the album's official track list was announced on 21 October 2014, the song was listed as "Track 5". Lorde, who curated the film's soundtrack, said on Twitter that the song was not excluded for "secrecy's sake" but because it was "not quite finished". A week later, Grande revealed in a livestream that she was included in the film's soundtrack. She described the song as "very interesting" and "very different." Lorde announced the track's title via Twitter on 3 November 2014.

== Composition and reception ==
"All My Love" is an electropop and dance-pop song, with elements of dancehall. Stereogum's Tom Breihan compared it to Grande's 2014 single, "Break Free", featuring Russian-German DJ Zedd. Exclaim writer Alex Hudson called the track an "electronic banger with in-your-face beats and a manic breakdown." Similarly, Complex writer Edwin Ortiz called the song an "electronic pop cut" with a "heart-pulsing backdrop". Brennan Carley of Spin noted that the song features "yelping, punctuated beats and synthesizers [that] pierce the air".

"All My Love" received mostly positive reviews from music critics. Michelle Geslani from Consequence of Sound called the song a "Grade A electropop banger." Geslani praised Diplo's "breezy yet bouncy island rhythms" and Grande's "angelic croon". In a review of the soundtrack, Nick Levine of NME stated that both artists sounded like they were "holding a rave in the rainforest". In a mixed review of the soundtrack, however, Jim Farber of New York Daily News called Grande's inclusion in the song a "commercial move", stating that her vocals proved "too mainstream for an album meant to project something sinister." "All My Love" was moderately successful in Belgium, where it peaked within the top 40 in both the Flanders and Wallonia chart components. It reached number 135 in France and number 194 in the United Kingdom.

== Remix ==
"All My Love (Remix)"

Remix by Major Lazer featuring Ariana Grande and Machel Montano

from the album Peace Is the Mission
- Released: January 21, 2015
- Studio: Mad Decent Studios (Burbank, CA); Metropolis Studios (London, England); KMP Music Lab (San Fernando, Trinidad)
- Genre: Soca; house; dubstep
- Length: 3:49
- Label: Mad Decent
- Songwriters: Thomas Pentz; Boaz de Jong; Philip Meckseper; Ella Yelich-O'Connor; Ariana Grande; Karen Ørsted; Machel Montano; Gamal Doyle
- Producers: Diplo; Boaz van de Beatz; Jr Blender

On 21 January 2015, a remix version featuring vocals from Grande and Trinidadian singer Machel Montano was released. It appears as the ninth track on Major Lazer's third studio album, Peace Is the Mission (2015). Diplo, a member of Major Lazer, co-wrote the song with producers Boaz de Jong Jr Blender, and Skinny Fabulous, and featured artist Machel Montano. A French version of the remix, featuring Grande, Montano, and the French duo Shin Sekaï, was released on 4 March 2016.

The remix was described by critics as a soca, house, and dubstep song, with influences of dancehall. Its instrumentation includes bass, bongo rhythms, and a beat drop. According to Pitchfork writer Claire Lobenfeld, the song features an interpolation of Aqua's 1997 song "Lollipop (Candyman)". Jon Dolan from Rolling Stone called the remix a "weapons-grade sun splash". Idolator writer Mike Wass called it an "effortless overhaul that deserves a spot on your next party playlist." Commercially, the remix of the song charted at number 87 on the Billboard Canadian Hot 100 chart and peaked at number 15 on the US Dance/Electronic Songs chart; it reached number 66 on the latter's year-end chart.

== Credits and personnel ==
Credits adapted from the liner notes of The Hunger Games: Mockingjay, Part 1 (Original Motion Picture Soundtrack).

Recording and management

- Recorded at Air Lyndhurst (London, United Kingdom)

Personnel

- Major Lazer – lead artist, production
- Ariana Grande-Butera – guest vocals, songwriting
- Karen Ørsted – songwriting
- Ella Yelich-O’Connor – songwriting
- Boaz van de Beatz – production
- Jr Blender – production

== Charts ==
=== Weekly charts ===
Chart (2014–16)	Peak position
Belgium (Ultratip Bubbling Under Flanders)	35
Belgium (Ultratip Bubbling Under Wallonia)	34
Canada Hot 100 (Billboard) Machel Montano remix	87
France (SNEP)	135
Scottish Singles Sales (Official Charts)	82
UK Singles (Official Charts Company)	194
US Hot Dance/Electronic Songs (Billboard) Machel Montano remix	15

=== Year-end charts ===
Chart (2015)	Position
US Dance/Electronic Songs (Billboard) Machel Montano remix	66
