= P18 (band) =

French Latin electronic band

P18 is an electro-Latino music band formed with former Mano Negra members Daniel Jamet, Philippe Teboul and Thomas Darnal.

== Albums ==
- Electropica – 2002
- Urban Cuban – 1999
- P18 ¡ Los Mejores ! – 1999

== Festivals ==
- Eurockéennes (1999)
- Couleur Café (1999, 2002)
- Caribana Festival (Switzerland) (2000)
