= Zone of Blue =

2015 studio album by Dogbowl

Studio album by Dogbowl
- Released: May 15, 2015
- Recorded: Swimming House Studio (Brussels, Belgium)
- Genre: Psychedelic pop
- Length: 34:59
- Label: 62TV
- Producer: Philippe Decoster

Dogbowl chronology
Songs for Narcisse (2005)	Zone of Blue (2015)

Zone of Blue is the eighth studio album by Dogbowl, independently released on May 15, 2015 by 62TV Records.

== Track listing ==
All tracks are written by Dogbowl, except "Love in Vain" by Robert Johnson.

No.	Title	Length
1.	"Long Island Railroad"	3:37
2.	"Love Is a Crystal"	3:16
3.	"I Love You, I Love You"	3:05
4.	"Blue Ambulance"	3:16
5.	"Transister Sister"	2:30
6.	"Love in Vain"	3:11
7.	"Long White Line"	2:57
8.	"Lunar Module"	3:32
9.	"Saturnian Soap Opera"	2:42
10.	"Red and Blue"	3:28
11.	"Zone of Blue"	3:25

== Personnel ==
Adapted from Zone of Blue liner notes.

- Dogbowl – vocals, guitar, cover art

Musicians

- Marleen Cappelemans – saxophone
- Philippe Decoster – bass guitar, production
- François Maquet – guitar
- Christophe Raes – drums

Additional musicians

- Rodolphe Coster – guitar (11)

Production and additional personnel

- Stéphane Schrevens – recording, mixing
- Uwe Teichert – mastering

== Release history ==
Region	Date	Label	Format	Catalog
United States	2015	62TV	CD, LP	BC0711
