= Songs for Narcisse =

Studio album by Dogbowl
- Released: 2005
- Recorded: February – March 2005
- Studio: The Eyeball Planet Studio (New York City, NY)
- Genre: Psychedelic pop
- Length: 42:40
- Label: Eyeball Planet
- Producer: Dogbowl

Dogbowl chronology
Best of Dogbowl (2001)	Songs for Narcisse (2005)	Zone of Blue (2015)

Songs for Narcisse is the seventh studio album by Dogbowl, independently released in 2005 by Eyeball Planet.

== Track listing ==
All tracks are written by Dogbowl, except "Ballad of the Boy Wonder" by Michael Cloup and "Waterloo Sunset" by Ray Davies.

No.	Title	Length
1.	"Narcisse"	2:56
2.	"On a One-Wheel"	2:45
3.	"A Constant Ringing"	3:44
4.	"Star"	3:03
5.	"Ballad of the Boywonder"	4:34
6.	"Lucinda Met a Boy"	3:19
7.	"Love-Self"	1:46
8.	"Here Comes the Buzzbomb"	5:17
9.	"A Thousand Anxities"	3:04
10.	"9mm Glock"	1:54
11.	"Penguin Jetliner"	6:27
12.	"Waterloo Sunset" (The Kinks cover)	3:52
13.	"She Likes Fur"	1:41
14.	"Love Another"	3:26

== Personnel ==
Adapted from Songs for Narcisse liner notes.

- Dogbowl – vocals, guitar, production, recording, mixing, cover art

Musicians

- Sidney Fleshflower – bass guitar
- Kiss-Kiss – electronic harpsitron
- Stephanie Samplestein – drums

== Release history ==
Region	Date	Label	Format	Catalog
United States	2005	Eyeball Planet	CD	eye003
