= Fantastic Carburetor Man =

Studio album by Dogbowl
- Released: 2001
- Recorded: The Eyeball Planet Studio (New York City, NY)
- Genre: Psychedelic pop
- Length: 52:37
- Label: Eyeball Planet
- Producer: Dogbowl

Dogbowl chronology
| The Zeppelin Record (1998) | Fantastic Carburetor Man (2001) | Best of Dogbowl (2001) |

Fantastic Carburetor Man is the sixth studio album by Dogbowl, independently released in 2001 by Eyeball Planet.

== Track listing ==
All tracks are written by Dogbowl.

| No. | Title | Length |
|---|---|---|
| 1. | "Mir" | 3:34 |
| 2. | "Hello Albatross" | 3:33 |
| 3. | "Riverside" | 4:29 |
| 4. | "Fantastic Carborator Man" | 2:23 |
| 5. | "Transplant Her Slowly" | 4:14 |
| 6. | "Floating Chrysanthemum" | 2:11 |
| 7. | "You Love Me" | 1:02 |
| 8. | "Oiseau Rougue" | 3:56 |
| 9. | "You in the Telstar" | 1:47 |
| 10. | "Sidewalk Open" | 2:52 |
| 11. | "Giant Wasp Running" | 1:31 |
| 12. | "A Whale With Legs" | 3:08 |
| 13. | "A Broken Heart (It Ain't No Good)" | 4:09 |
| 14. | "Toupee It Flies" | 1:35 |
| 15. | "The 1972 Christmas Bombing of North Vietnam" | 2:56 |
| 16. | "Moths Fluttering Under Streetlamps" | 3:59 |
| 17. | "Bus" | 5:18 |

== Personnel ==
Adapted from Fantastic Carburetor Man liner notes.

- Dogbowl – vocals, instruments, production, engineering, cover art

== Release history ==
| Region | Date | Label | Format | Catalog |
|---|---|---|---|---|
| United States | 2001 | Eyeball Planet | CD | eye001 |
