= Boaz van de Beatz =

- Born: Boaz de Jong; December 15, 1988 (age 37)
- Origin: Gorinchem, Netherlands
- Genres: EDM; electro house; trap; hardstyle; Nederhop; jumptek; dubstep; moombahton
- Occupations: Record producer; DJ
- Years active: 2008–present
- Labels: Nouveau Riche; Mad Decent; Owsla
- Website: maddecent.com/artists/boaz-van-de-beatz/

Boaz de Jong (born December 15, 1988), better known by his stage name Boaz van de Beatz or simply Boaz, is a Dutch record producer and DJ. He is the founder of the Nouveau Riche record label, which includes popular Dutch artists Mr. Polska and Jebroer. Van de Beatz has helped launch the careers of many artists under his label, as well as his frequent collaborator Ronnie Flex and DJ trio Yellow Claw. Since 2013, van de Beatz has transitioned from mainly producing Dutch hip hop songs to releasing electronic music as a lead artist – he has released two EPs under the American dance label Mad Decent.

Van de Beatz is also affiliated with producer Diplo, with whom he contributes to the DJ group Major Lazer. Van de Beatz is known for his unique musical style of creating "insane rap songs that would span four–five genres in about three and a half minutes." His songs incorporate elements of dance. Van de Beatz received the Dutch State Award for "best producer" for three years in a row between 2011 and 2013. He has produced for artists such as Yellow Claw, Diplo, Major Lazer, Jack Ü, The Partysquad, Madonna, Ariana Grande, Pharrell Williams and Sean Paul, among others.

He produced the song Move Up for Mr.Polska, which was used as the theme song for the Dutch rollercoaster Lost Gravity, stationed in Walibi Holland.

== Career ==
"Once I have released something I can not listen to it without hating it. Once I have a file rendered and have an .mp3, I don't want to click play - I know I'm going to hear something that is not good and then I'll sit down again [and work on it] until it becomes so, but that is the problem - music is never good."

— Boaz van de Beatz in an interview with Ballinnn.com in 2015. (Translated from Dutch)

At 17, Boaz moved to live alone, when his parents emigrated to Israel. He turned his house in Gorinchem into a studio and started to search for rappers to record with. He soon discovered Jebroer and Digitzz, later joined by Mr. Polska and Ronnie Flex, all of whom started their careers at that time. In 2015, van de Beatz reflected on that period: "It was a nice time, but I really do not miss it, man. It was especially stressful."

Van de Beatz released his debut 4-track EP Flontie Stacks in June 2013 under Mad Decent and Jeffree's. On July 10, 2014, his debut single "No Way Home" was released under Mad Decent. The track features frequent collaborators Mr. Polska and Ronnie Flex. Van de Beatz's second EP Horse Force was set for an August 2014 release. However, it was delayed until March 2015, due to van de Beatz's busy schedule working on other projects, producing for artists on his label, executive producing an album by Ronnie Flex and working with Diplo and Major Lazer. Horse Force features Dutch artists Mr. Polska, Ronnie Flex, and Kalibwoy, as well as American rapper Riff Raff.

In November 2014, van de Beatz produced Ariana Grande's song "All My Love", which was featured on the soundtrack of The Hunger Games: Mockingjay, Part 1. In 2015, van de Beatz worked on Madonna's single "Bitch I'm Madonna" as a ghost producer along Diplo and Sophie. On June 22, 2015, he released a remix of "Hey Mama" by David Guetta, to celebrate reaching 2 billion streams on Spotify. In January 2016, he released a song titled "Flippo" on Skrillex's Owsla Worldwide Broadcast. On October 9, 2017, van de Beatz collaborated with Trobi, Adika, and Kalibwoy on "U Don't Know," making a rare appearance on the Dutch record label Spinnin Records.

== Nouveau Riche ==
Nouveau Riche
- Founded: 2008
- Founder: Boaz van de Beatz
- Status: Active
- Genre: Various
- Country of origin: Netherlands
- Official website: www.nouveaurichemusic.com

Nouveau Riche was founded by van de Beatz in 2008. Notable releases include the 2014 single "Banaan" by Jebroer, Stepherd, Skinto and Jayh, which was certified Gold in Belgium and has stayed for over 15 weeks in the Belgian Top 50.

== Discography ==
=== EPs ===
- Flontie Stacks (Released July 9, 2013)
- Horse Force (Released March 3, 2015)

=== Singles ===
- "No Way Home" (featuring Mr. Polska and Ronnie Flex) (Released July 10, 2014)
- "Hausa Wausa" (Mr. Polska & Boaz van de Beatz)
- "CROWN" (Diplo - feat. Boaz van de Beatz, Mike Posner & RiFF RAFF)
- "Ravelord" (LNY TNZ & Boaz van de Beatz feat. Mr. Polska & Kalibwoy)
- "Flippo" (on Owsla Worldwide Broadcast)
- "The Right Side" (Rät N FrikK & Boaz van de Beatz)
- "U Don't Know" (Boaz van de Beatz, Trobi, Adika, Kalibwoy)
- Chu Chu Clap (Mr. Polska, Boaz van de Beatz, G-Buck)
- "The Hardest" (Boaz van de Beatz, LNY TNZ)
- "Warmth" (Dvbbs, Boaz van de Beatz, Jono Dorr)

=== Productions ===
- Jebroer feat. Rich Cutillo - Allemaal Lichten
- Jebroer feat. I Am Aisha - Herrie In Me Oor
- Ronnie Flex - Onder Je Lokken (Soundtrack 'Feuten Het Feestje')
- Ronnie Flex - Pocahontas
- Ronnie Flex - Ik Wil Het Hebben ft. Gers Pardoel
- Mr. Polska & Ronnie Flex - Ravotten
- Mr. Polska - Vlammen
- Mr. Polska feat. Ronnie Flex - Soldaatje
- Ronnie Flex - Zusje ft. Mr. Polska
- Ronnie Flex - Tankstation
- Mr Polska - Move Up (Lost Gravity)
- Mr. Polska - Bazooka
- Jebroer - Brommer
- Jebroer - Vriendje
- Jebroer - Van Een Andere Moer
- Jebroer - Omlaag
- Jebroer feat. Ronnie Flex - Beter Nu
- Jebroer feat. Mr. Polska, Skinto & Ronnie Flex - Hoesten Als Bejaarden
- Mr. Polska & Teske - Samen
- Ronnie Flex - Achteruit (prod. Boaz van de Beatz & Ronnie Flex)
- Ronnie Flex ft. Boef - Come Again (prod. by Boaz van de Beatz, Afro Bros & Ronnie Flex)
- Ronnie Flex - Energie ft. Frenna (prod. Boaz van de Beatz, Ronnie Flex & Afro Bros)
- Yellow Claw - Allermooiste Feestje Ft. Mr. Polska & Ronnie Flex (co-produced by Boaz & Yellow Claw)
- AMY MIYÚ & Rochelle - All Good (prod. Boaz van de Beatz)
- Dudu Faruk - King of the Summer (Hebrew: מלך הקיץ)
- Blackpink - Jump (prod. by Diplo, 24, Boaz van de Beatz, Zecca, Ape Drums)
