= Blackwave. =

Belgian hip-hop duo

blackwave.

Background information
- Origin: Antwerp, Belgium
- Genres: Hip hop; R&B
- Members: Willem Ardui; Jean-Valéry Atohoun
- Website: www.blackwavedot.com

blackwave. (also known as blackwavedot) is a Belgian hip-hop duo composed of producer Willem Ardui and rapper Jean-Valéry Atohoun. Their influences include The Roots, Prince, Parliament-Funkadelic and Brockhampton. The group, in an interview with Billboard, said "We love incorporating all kinds of different genres in our music and challenging ourselves to always try something different."

The band released their first album, Mic Check, in 2017. Their second album, Are We Still Dreaming?, was released in 2019 and reached 4th place in the Belgium Top 200 Albums. Their third album, No Sleep in LA, was released in 2022 and peaked in first place for one week.

In 2019, blackwave. was nominated for the 2019 MTV Europe Music Awards in the 'Best Belgian Act' category, losing out to MATTN.

== Discography ==
=== Albums ===
List of albums, with selected chart positions and details
Title	Album details	Peak chart positions	Notes
Title	Album details	BEL (FL)	Notes
Mic Check	Released: 12 May 2017; Label: Sony Music Entertainment Belgium; Format: Digital download, streaming	161	No. / Title / Length; 1. / "Hands Up!" / 3:39; 2. / "That's Just Me" / 3:02; 3. / "BIG Dreams" / 3:07; 4. / "If I" / 3:34; 5. / "Add The Lessons" / 0:43; 6. / "The Juice" / 2:16; 7. / "Flow" (featuring Caleborate) / 2:59; 8. / "Caleb's Skit" (featuring Caleborate) / 0:42; Total length: / / 20:05
Are We Still Dreaming?	Released: 8 November 2019; Label: Sony Music Entertainment Belgium; Format: Digital download, streaming	4	No. / Title / Length; 1. / "[press start]" / 0:06; 2. / "Realize Now" (featuring Yellow Straps) / 3:38; 3. / "GoodEnough" (featuring WesleyFranklin) / 3:18; 4. / "In the Middle" / 3:45; 5. / "Smoke Out/True Colors" / 3:16; 6. / "Elusive" (featuring David Ngyah) / 3:41; 7. / "Arp299" / 2:31; 8. / "Lowkey" / 2:38; 9. / "SWISH" / 2:56; 10. / "The Antidote" (featuring Winston Surfshirt & Benny Sings) / 3:16; 11. / "Listen to the Kids" / 4:00; 12. / "Bittersweet Baby" (featuring Konteks) / 3:19; 13. / "(whateva)" / 0:45; 14. / "home" (featuring Caleborate) / 4:02; 15. / "Up There" (featuring Pell, Caleborate, K1D) / 4:16; 16. / "Lava" / 3:20; 17. / "Figure" / 3:40; Total length: / / 52:27
No Sleep in LA	Released: 9 September 2022; Label: black.wav, PIAS; Format: Digital download, streaming	1	

=== Singles ===
List of singles, showing year released and album
Title	Year	Album
"Flow" (featuring Caleborate)	2017	Mic Check
"If I"	2017	Mic Check
"BIG Dreams"	2017	Mic Check
"Hands Up!"	2017	Mic Check
"Elusive" (featuring David Ngyah)	2017	Are We Still Dreaming?
"Swangin'"	2018	Non-album singles
"Whasgood?!"	2018	Non-album singles
"GoodEnough" (featuring Wesley Franklin)	2018	Are We Still Dreaming?
"never seen u"	2019	Non-album single
"Home"	2019	Are We Still Dreaming?
"Up There" (featuring Pell, Caleborate, K1D)	2019	Are We Still Dreaming?
"These Days" (featuring Caleborate)	2019	Non-album single
"The Antidote" (Winston Surfshirt featuring Benny Sings)	2019	Are We Still Dreaming?
