= The Zeppelin Record =

Studio album by Dogbowl
- Released: September 1998
- Recorded: Studios de la Seine (Paris, France)
- Genre: Folk rock
- Length: 72:23
- Label: Lithium
- Producer: Dogbowl

Dogbowl chronology
Gunsmoke (1996)	The Zeppelin Record (1998)	Fantastic Carburetor Man (2001)

The Zeppelin Record is the fifth studio album by Dogbowl, released in September 1998 by Lithium Records. Released five years after 1993's Project Success, The Zeppelin Record marked the first time Dogbowl had not issued an album through Shimmy Disc and had gone without the collaborative aid of his brother Christopher Tunney and producer Kramer. Instead, he opted to produce the album himself in Paris, where he had been living with his wife and children.

== Track listing ==
All tracks are written by Dogbowl.

No.	Title	Length
1.	"Zeppelin Always Crashing"	4:26
2.	"Silhouette"	4:33
3.	"Oklahoma"	4:02
4.	"Womanizer"	7:15
5.	"Fly"	5:07
6.	"Follow My Roving Eyeball"	3:47
7.	"The President Was Shot"	3:33
8.	"Tokyo Exists Only in Dreams"	4:27
9.	"City of Lights"	5:23
10.	"Basketball Girl No. 5"	4:43
11.	"Peggietta"	3:34
12.	"Electric Eel Merry-Go-Round"	3:08
13.	"English Girl"	2:24
14.	"The Brooklyn Bridge Collapses into a Rose"	4:59
15.	"Revolve in You"	5:09
16.	"The Girl With the Venetian Eyes"	5:53

== Personnel ==
Adapted from The Zeppelin Record liner notes.

- Dogbowl – lead vocals, guitar, production

Musicians

- Boris Declerck – bass guitar
- Dominique Depret – guitar
- Race Age – drums, percussion
- Philippe Sirop – drums, percussion

Production and additional personnel

- Damien Bertrand – engineering
- Jean-Francois Marvaud – engineering
- Nicolas Vernhes – engineering

== Release history ==
Region	Date	Label	Format	Catalog
United States	1998	Lithium	CD	CD REPS 213
