= Hot Day in Waco =

Studio album by Dogbowl & Kramer
- Released: October 31, 1994
- Recorded: 1993
- Studio: Noise New Jersey; Jersey City, New Jersey
- Genre: Psychedelic pop
- Length: 40:26
- Label: Shimmy Disc
- Producer: Kramer

Dogbowl chronology
Project Success (1993)	Hot Day in Waco (1994)	Gunsmoke (1996)

Kramer chronology
The Secret of Comedy (1994)	Hot Day in Waco (1994)	A Remark Hugh Made (1994)

Professional ratings
Review scores
Source	Rating
AllMusic	4.5/5 stars
NME	(6/10)

Hot Day in Waco is a studio album by Dogbowl and Kramer, released on October 31, 1994, by Shimmy Disc.

== Track listing ==
All tracks are written by Dogbowl, except "The Tracks of My Tears" by Pete Moore, Smokey Robinson and Marv Tarplin.

No.	Title	Length
1.	"Meg"	4:00
2.	"Tarantula"	4:26
3.	"Basketball Girl No. 5"	5:48
4.	"When the Sun Goes Down"	4:18
5.	"Wind It Up"	3:33
6.	"Gargoyle"	3:58
7.	"Platform Girl"	2:49
8.	"The Tracks of My Tears" (The Miracles cover)	2:58
9.	"Palm Wine on Palm Sunday"	4:14
10.	"Hot Day in Waco"	4:22

== Personnel ==
Adapted from Hot Day in Waco liner notes.

Musicians

- Dogbowl – vocals, guitar
- Kramer – vocals, instruments, production, engineering

Production and additional personnel

- DAM – design
- Michael Macioce – photography

== Release history ==
Region	Date	Label	Format	Catalog
United States	1994	Shimmy Disc	CD	shimmy 073
