= Gunsmoke (Dogbowl and Kramer album) =

Studio album by Dogbowl & Kramer
- Released: February 13, 1996
- Recorded: 1995
- Studio: Noise New Jersey (Jersey City, NJ)
- Genre: Psychedelic pop
- Length: 40:56
- Label: Shimmy Disc
- Producer: Kramer

Dogbowl chronology
Hot Day in Waco (1994)	Gunsmoke (1996)	The Zeppelin Record (1998)

Kramer chronology
Music for Crying (1995)	Gunsmoke (1996)	Still Alive in '95 (1996)

Gunsmoke is the second studio album by Dogbowl and Kramer, released on February 13, 1996, by Shimmy Disc.

== Track listing ==
All tracks are written by Dogbowl, except "Gunsmoke" co-written by Mark Kramer and "Goin' to the Hashbar" co-written by Mark Blomquist.

No.	Title	Length
1.	"Pollyanna Penelope"	2:46
2.	"Gunsmoke"	2:52
3.	"I'm Not Insane"	3:25
4.	"Nothing Better"	5:51
5.	"Huge, Horrible Carrot"	2:45
6.	"She and Me"	3:53
7.	"Paper Man"	2:44
8.	"Cindy on the Sidewalk"	3:06
9.	"Waiting Room"	4:26
10.	"Blue"	3:17
11.	"Fallen Angel of Amsterdam"	3:34
12.	"Goin' to the Hashbar"	2:17

== Personnel ==
Adapted from Gunsmoke liner notes.

Musicians

- Dogbowl – vocals, guitar
- Kramer – vocals, slide guitar, bass guitar, drums, percussion, mellotron, piano, flute, tapes, production, engineering, photography

Production and additional personnel

- Jed Rothenberg – assistant engineer
- Steve Watson – assistant engineer

== Release history ==
Region	Date	Label	Format	Catalog
United States	1996	Shimmy Disc	CD	shimmy 083
