= Babylon Circus =

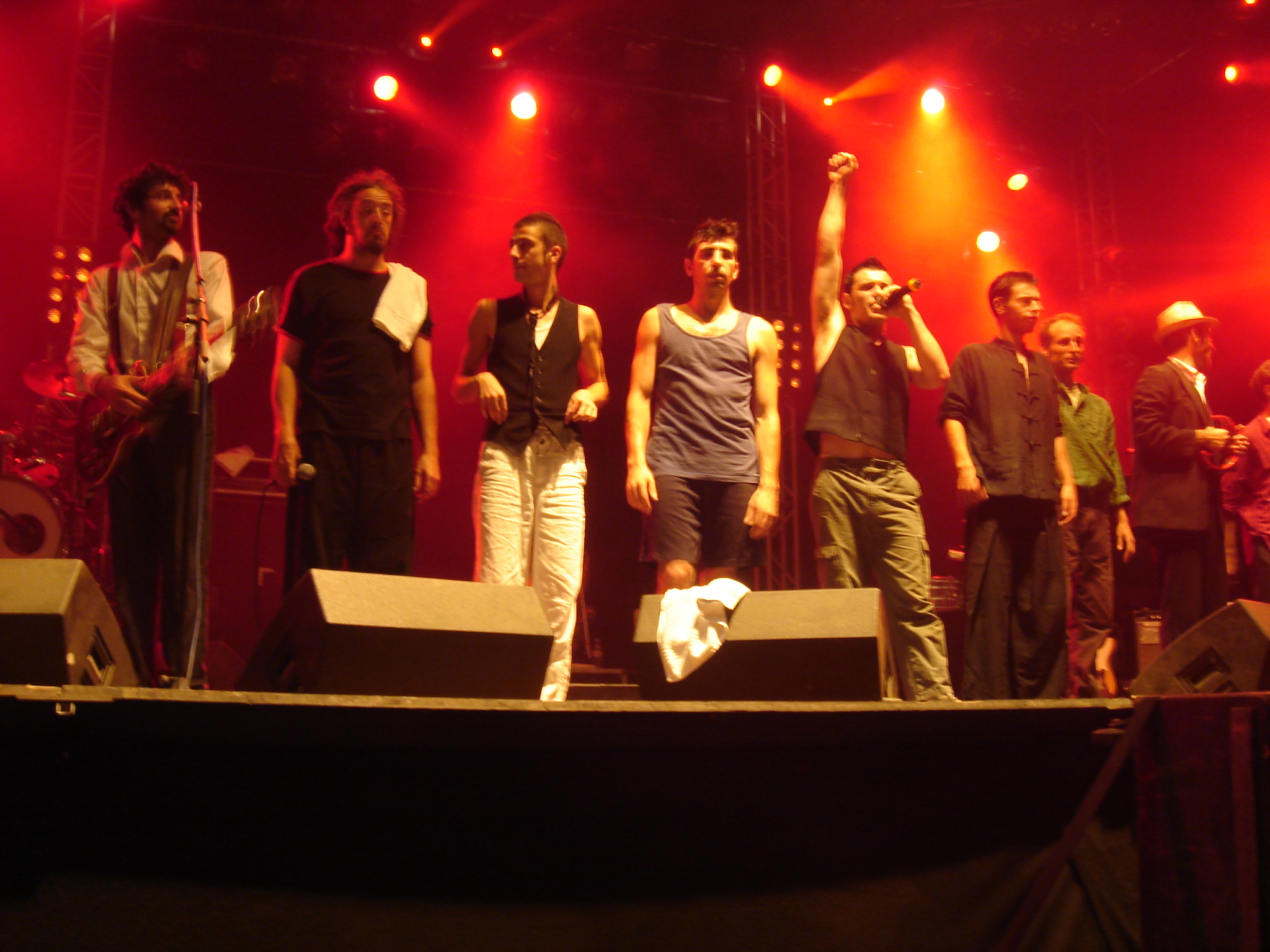
- Babylon Circus at Open Air Gampel (Valais, Switzerland), 2006

Background information
- Origin: Lyon, France
- Genres: Ska, Reggae, Rock
- Years active: 1995 - Present
- Website: http://www.babyloncircus.net/

Babylon Circus is a nine-piece ska and reggae group founded in 1995 in Lyon, France. Since forming, they have released six full - length albums and one EP. They have played over 1500 shows throughout Europe, and have toured as far as Syria, Australia and South Africa

The band began as a ska group but quickly transcended the genre, mixing punk, reggae, rock, swing and jazz influences. They sing in both French and English, sometimes mixing the two in songs. Their third album, Dances of Resistance, was recorded in 2003 and largely has an anti-war theme. In 2009 they launched the album La Belle Étoile followed by Never Stop in 2013. They are still on tour all over the world, from their own country France to other countries in Europe, but also to foreign places like Abu Dhabi and New Zealand.

== Discography ==
- 1996: Demo 1
- 1997: Musika
- 1999: Tout va bien (EP)
- 2001: Au marché des illusions
- 2004: Dances of Resistance (Yelen Musiques/Sony Entertainment France, Rough Trade)
- 2009: La Belle étoile
- 2013: Never Stop
- 2020: State of Emergency

== Members ==
- David Baruchel - vocals, guitar
- Manuel Nectoux - vocals
- Christophe Millot - saxophone, clarinet, accordion, flute, bgv
- Olivier Soumali - keyboards, bgv
- Georges Chaccour - guitar, bgv
- Clement Amirault - trombone, tuba, Barrel organ
- Valentin Meylan - trumpet
- Rémy Labordère - drums
- Raph Vallade - bass
