= Cyclops Nuclear Submarine Captain =

Studio album by Dogbowl
- Released: 1991
- Recorded: Noise New York (New York City, NY)
- Genre: Psychedelic pop
- Length: 59:27
- Label: Shimmy Disc, Needlejuice Records
- Producer: Kramer

Dogbowl chronology
Tit! An Opera (1989)	Cyclops Nuclear Submarine Captain (1991)	Flan (1992)

Professional ratings
Review scores
Source	Rating
Allmusic	4/5 stars

Cyclops Nuclear Submarine Captain is the second studio album by Dogbowl, released in 1991 by Shimmy Disc.

== Track listing ==
All tracks are written by Dogbowl.

No.	Title	Length
1.	"You Hit Me Over My Head"	3:48
2.	"Cyclops Nuclear Submarine Captain"	3:45
3.	"South American Eye"	2:49
4.	"Swan"	2:32
5.	"Ferris Wheel"	3:21
6.	"Toilet!"	2:38
7.	"Silkworm Exploding"	3:10
8.	"Window Fall Down"	3:24
9.	"Float"	3:23
10.	"Love Bomb"	3:49
11.	"Revolution of the Homeless"	3:53
12.	"Flying Saucer Over Mongolia"	3:16
13.	"Beautiful Trailer Park"	2:55
14.	"Apple Mary"	3:11
15.	"Flower Garden Bed"	3:01
16.	"Carnival in the Swamp"	2:17
17.	"So Painful"	1:59
18.	"Cyclops N.S.C. (Reprise)"	0:58
19.	"Shopping Mall"	4:18

== Personnel ==
Adapted from Cyclops Nuclear Submarine Captain liner notes.

- Dogbowl – lead vocals, guitar

Musicians

- Daryl Dragon – guitar, additional vocals
- Raceage – drums, percussion, additional vocals
- Michael J. Schumacher – drums, guitar
- Lee Ming Tah – bass guitar, additional vocals
- Chris Tunney – clarinet, saxophone, organ, additional vocals

Production and additional personnel

- Kramer – production, engineering, organ, additional vocals
- Michael Macioce – photography
- Ron Paul – assistant engineer

== Release history ==
Region	Date	Label	Format	Catalog
United States	1991	Shimmy Disc	CD, CS, LP	shimmy 043
Europe	1991	Shimmy Disc	CD	SDE 9135 CD
