= Flan (album) =

Studio album by Dogbowl
- Released: 1992
- Recorded: 1992
- Studio: Noise New Jersey (Jersey City, NJ)
- Genre: Psychedelic pop
- Length: 55:41
- Label: Shimmy Disc, Needlejuice Records
- Producer: Kramer

Dogbowl chronology
Cyclops Nuclear Submarine Captain (1991)	Flan (1992)	Project Success (1993)

Professional ratings
Review scores
Source	Rating
Allmusic	3/5 stars
Q	3/5 stars

Flan is the third studio album by the avant-garde artist Dogbowl. It was released in 1992 on Shimmy Disc.

== Track listing ==
All tracks are written by Dogbowl.

No.	Title	Length
1.	"Flan Awoke"	3:04
2.	"Ginger Kang Kang"	2:54
3.	"Supermarket"	2:32
4.	"Michael the Human Headed Dog"	2:37
5.	"Walking Away"	2:48
6.	"Holly's World"	2:29
7.	"Transforming the Eyeball"	2:46
8.	"Grey Tulip"	3:11
9.	"Here Come the Cannibals"	0:57
10.	"Blows His Mind"	4:49
11.	"Constellation (The Reoccurring Dream)"	1:20
12.	"Mermaid in My Coffee Cup"	3:28
13.	"Airplane"	2:45
14.	"Metropolis"	5:34
15.	"A Memory"	1:25
16.	"Doggie Can Fly"	3:09
17.	"Hello Helen"	2:00
18.	"Flake of Ash"	2:00
19.	"Spider Headed Farmer"	1:44
20.	"Rat Attacks Flan"	3:01
21.	"Flowers Turn on Their Stems"	1:08

== Personnel ==
Adapted from Flan liner notes.

- Dogbowl – lead vocals, guitar, illustrations

Musicians

- Race Age – drums, percussion
- Michael J. Schumacher – guitar, piano, synthesizer
- Lee Ming Tah – bass guitar, steel guitar
- Christopher Tunney – clarinet, saxophone, tin whistle, organ, backing vocals

Production and additional personnel

- Kramer – production, engineering
- Michael Macioce – photography
- Ron Paul – assistant engineer

== Release history ==
Region	Date	Label	Format	Catalog
United States	1992	Shimmy Disc	CD, CS, LP	shimmy 053
