= Girls in Hawaii =

Belgian indie pop band

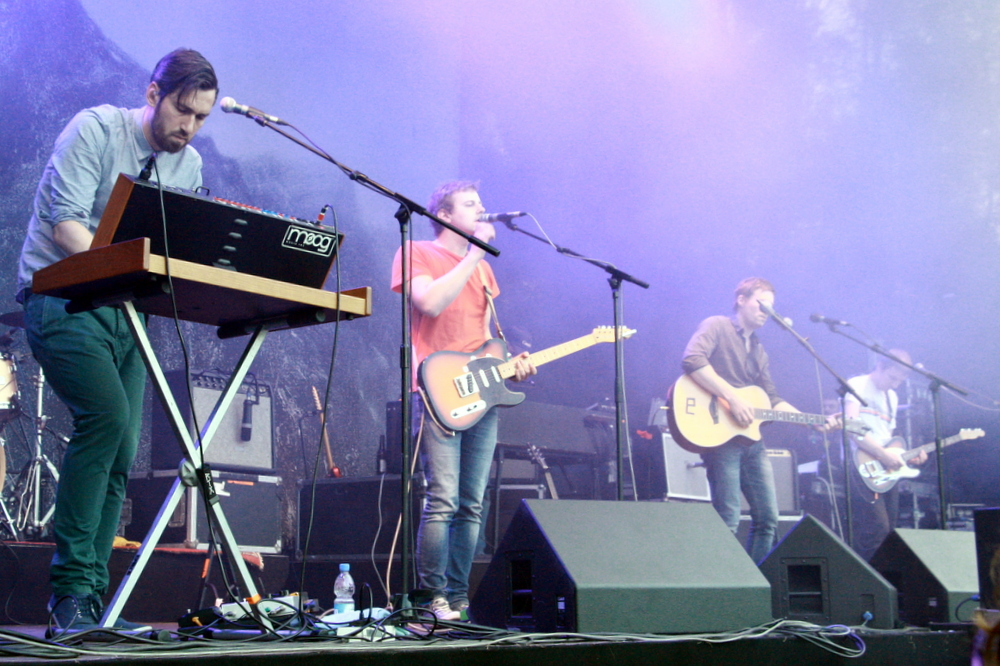
- Girls in Hawaii performing in 2014

Background information
- Origin: Belgium
- Genres: Indie pop Indie rock
- Years active: 2001–present
- Labels: 62TV (Belgium); China Shop (United States); Naïve (France)
- Members: Antoine Wielemans; François Gustin; Daniel Offerman; Brice Vancauwenberghe; Lionel Vancauwenberghe; Boris Gronemberger
- Past members: Denis Wielemans; Christophe Léonard
- Website: www.girlsinhawaii.be

Girls in Hawaii is a Belgian indie pop band.

Girls in Hawaii's first release was Found in the Ground: The Winter EP in early 2003, after which the band toured Belgium and France. In the meantime they started recording what would become their first LP.

From Here To There was released in November 2003 in Belgium and in early 2004 in Europe. It was well-received across Europe, where the band went on a promotional tour through Belgium, France, Italy, Germany and Spain. The record was later released in Japan and, in October 2005, China Shop Music released it in the United States. The band started a short tour of the West Coast of the United States in April 2006.

Their second full-length album, Plan Your Escape, was released in February 2008 in Europe. It was recorded in old houses in the Ardennes Forest by producer Jean Lamoot (who has worked with French artists such as Noir Désir and Alain Bashung). The album, more complex and eclectic than the previous, contains twelve songs; the first single was called "This Farm Will End Up in Fire". The band toured Europe promoting the album during 2008.

In February 2009 Not Here, a documentary relating the life of the band during that tour, was released on DVD.

On 30 May 2010, 28 year-old drummer Denis Wielemans died in a car accident in Brussels.

In 2012 they started working on their third album, Everest. The album was released on 2 September 2013. In the summer of 2014, they released a new EP, Refuge.

In October 2014, they released a live album, Hello Strange, which revisits old songs in an acoustic and/or electronic way.

In September 2017, they released Nocturne, their fourth album which sees them experimenting with electronic sounds. The band went on tour throughout Europe and Québec to promote the record.

In December 2023, Girls in Hawaii celebrated their first album 20th anniversary with four sold out shows at the Ancienne Belgique in Brussels. From Here to There was re-issued for the occasion and the band announced they were working on a new album.

Eldorado, their fifth record, is scheduled to be released on 26 September 2026. It was preceded by the single "Is It Happening Right Now?" which was released on April 2.

== Members ==
=== Current members ===
- Antoine Wielemans – vocals, guitar
- Lionel Vancauwenberge – vocals, guitar
- François Gustin – guitar, keyboard
- Daniel Offermann – bass
- Brice Vancauwenberghe – guitar
- Boris Gronemberger – drums

=== Past members ===
- Denis Wielemans
- Christophe Léonard

== Discography ==
=== Albums ===
Album details	Peak positions			
Album details	BEL (Fl)	BEL (Wa)	FR	SWI
From Here to There: Release date: 25 October 2005; Record label: China Shop Music	–	9	104	–
Plan Your Escape: Release date: 2008; Record label: 62TV	15	2	40	82
Everest: Release date: 2013; Record label: 62TV	5	2	38	88
Hello Strange: Release date: 2014; Record label: 62TV	114	24	194	-
Nocturne: Release date: 2017; Record label: 62TV	22	5	58	-
Eldorado: Release date: 25 September 2026; Record label: Capitane	-	5	167	-

=== EPs ===
- 2003: Found in the Ground: The Winter EP (62TV Records)

=== Contributions ===
- 2007: "Out on the Weekend" in Sounds Eclectic: The Covers Project
