= Tit! (An Opera) =

Studio album by Dogbowl
- Released: 1989
- Recorded: Noise New York (New York City, NY)
- Genre: Psychedelic pop
- Length: 48:48
- Label: Shimmy Disc, Needlejuice Records
- Producer: Kramer

Dogbowl chronology
Tit! (An Opera) (1989)	Cyclops Nuclear Submarine Captain (1991)

Professional ratings
Review scores
Source	Rating
Allmusic	2/5 stars

Tit! (An Opera) is the debut studio album of Dogbowl, released in 1989 by Shimmy Disc. It was re-issued on CD in 1992 with six additional songs. In 2023, it was re-released by Needlejuice Records to include all tracks from the CD and original cassette issue.

== Track listing ==
All tracks are written by Dogbowl.

Side one
No.	Title	Length
1.	"On the Monkeybars"	3:27
2.	"Starving for Love"	2:37
3.	"Obsessed With Girls"	2:18
4.	"Oklahoma"	3:15
5.	"Under the Water"	1:48
6.	"The Girl With the Pelican Hair"	3:17
7.	"Miss You So Much (I Can Die)"	2:31
8.	"Growing Up in a Wheelchair"	4:30

Side two
No.	Title	Length
1.	"Krystellina"	1:32
2.	"When the Romans Died"	2:20
3.	"Anatasia"	4:01
4.	"Sex Gorrillas"	2:19
5.	"Dolphin"	3:24
6.	"Daytime"	2:21
7.	"I Had a Dream of the Plague"	5:45
8.	"Flowers from Katrinka"	3:15

CD issue
No.	Title	Length
1.	"On the Monkeybars"	3:27
2.	"Starving for Love"	2:37
3.	"Obsessed With Girls"	2:18
4.	"Oklahoma"	3:15
5.	"Under the Water"	1:48
6.	"The Girl With the Pelican Hair"	3:17
7.	"Miss You So Much (I Can Die)"	2:31
8.	"Growing Up in a Wheelchair"	4:30
9.	"Volcano"	1:50
10.	"Sad Fellow"	3:01
11.	"Krystellina"	1:32
12.	"When the Romans Died"	2:20
13.	"Anatasia"	4:01
14.	"Sex Gorrillas"	2:19
15.	"Dolphin"	3:24
16.	"Daytime"	2:21
17.	"I Had a Dream of the Plague"	5:45
18.	"Flowers from Katrinka"	3:15
19.	"Marla Sits"	1:53
20.	"One So Black"	3:21
21.	"Head Caves In"	2:26
22.	"Blue Eyes"	2:55

== Personnel ==
Adapted from Tit! (An Opera) liner notes.

- Dogbowl – lead vocals, guitar, drums, percussion, cover art, illustrations

Musicians

- Charles Curtis – cello
- Kramer – bass guitar, guitar, percussion, production, engineering
- Lee Ming Tah – Hawaiian lap steel guitar
- Chris Tunney – clarinet, organ, backing vocals

Production and additional personnel

- David Larr – art direction
- Michael Macioce – photography
- Angel Marcloid – remastering (2023 reissue)

== Release history ==
Region	Date	Label	Format	Catalog
United States	1989	Shimmy Disc	CS, LP	shimmy 023
Europe	1991	Shimmy Disc	CD	SDE 9030 CD
United States	2023	Needlejuice	DL	NJR-160
