= Tarrus Riley =

Jamaican-American musician (born 1981)

Tarrus Riley CD
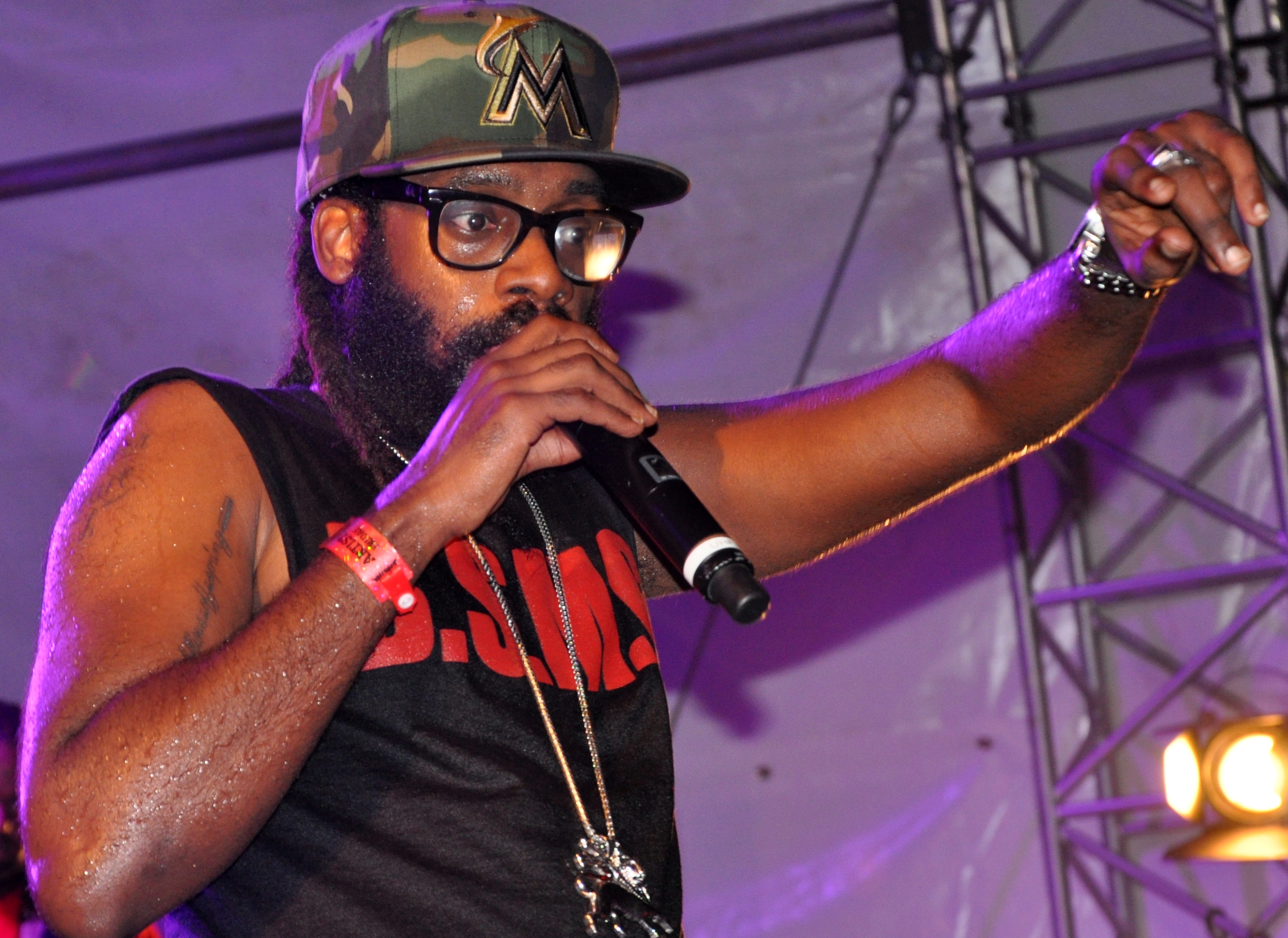
- Riley at the Summerjam Festival 2013

Background information
- Born: Omar Riley; 26 April 1981 (age 45); The Bronx, New York, United States
- Origin: Kingston, Jamaica
- Genre: Reggae
- Occupation: Musician
- Instruments: Vocals; guitar
- Years active: 2005–present
- Labels: VP; Cannon Productions
- Website: tarrusriley.com
- Father: Jimmy Riley

Omar "Tarrus" Riley, CD (born April 26, 1981) is a Jamaican-American reggae singer and member of the Rastafari movement.

== Biography ==
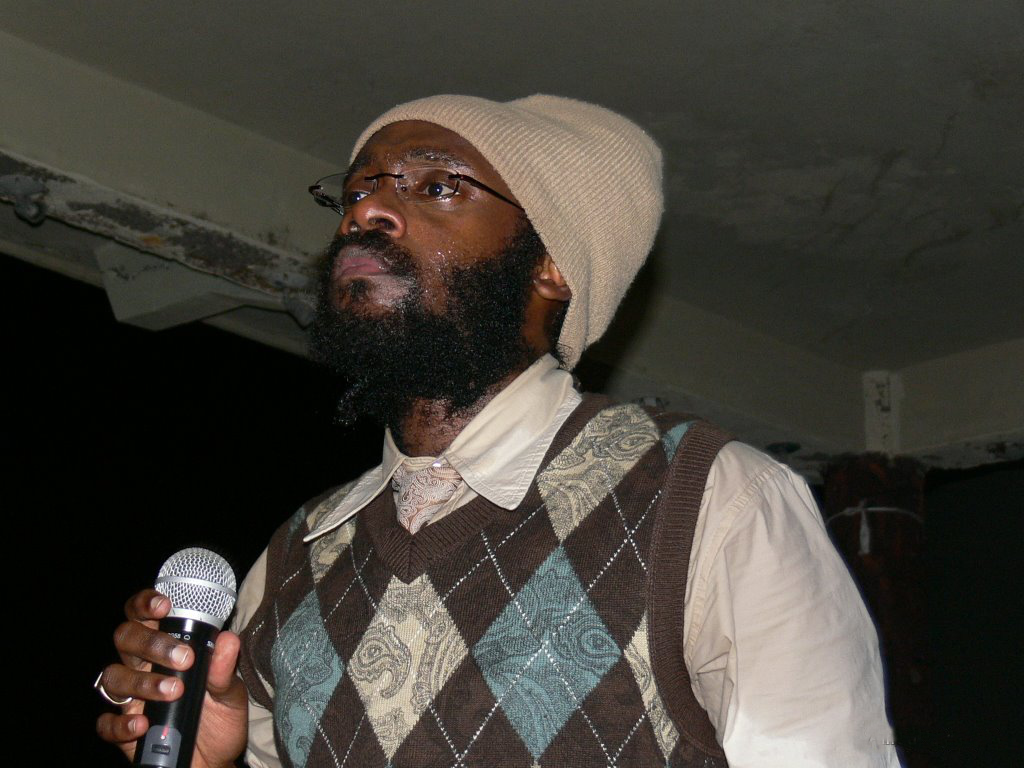
Performing at Negril Escape, 2009

Riley was born in The Bronx, New York, United States, and was raised in Jamaica. His father Jimmy Riley was a veteran reggae singer. Tarrus made his recording debut as a teenager. In 2004, he released his debut album, Challenges.

Riley has consistently racked up awards for his work. Among his accolades are Best Singer, Male Vocalist, Cultural Artiste, Song of the Year, and Best Song. Some of the awards institutions that have rewarded Riley include the Youth View Awards, The Star People's Choice Awards, EME Awards, and the Reggae Academy awards. He is the holder of Jamaica's CVM TV's 15th Anniversary Award, held in February 2009, for the "Most Admired Song in the Past 15 Years" for the hit "She's Royal".

In 2009, Riley released his third album, Contagious, on Cannon Productions. The album was distributed by VP Records. It contained the hits "Start Anew", "Contagious", and "Good Girl Gone Bad" featuring Konshens and Superman, a cover of a Robin Thicke original. 2010 saw the release of the chart-topper "Protect the People", which scaled several charts in Jamaica and across the Caribbean. Early 2011 saw the release of the Black History-themed "Shaka Zulu Pickney", which was featured on a Nyabinghi rhythm album from Bombrush Music. The video for the song, which was directed by Storm Saulter, was well received upon its release. His interest in educating the youth about Black History resulted in the Tarrus Riley Freedom Writers Competition, which ran on Jamaica's Irie FM radio station.

2011 also saw the release of videos for hit singles including "Come Ova" and "Never Leave I". Both songs became hits on Jamaican radio as well as in several Caribbean territories. Riley has performed on several stages around the world. His performances have drawn credible reviews from the media in the Caribbean, North America, the United States and Europe.

Riley tours Europe once each year, performing on the major reggae festivals in several European countries. Riley's most recent high-profile performances include the 2011 Jamaica Jazz and Blues Festival and Roskilde Festival 2011 in Denmark, Reggae Sumfest 2010, Betty Wright and Friends in concert in Jamaica, and the Palmyra Foundation's Fundraising event. He also headlined the Hennessey Artistry show in Barbados in December 2011, with a return to the same event scheduled for December 2019.

Among his accolades in 2011 were the EME Awards (Excellence in Music and Entertainment) for Vocalist of the Year Male and Cultural Artiste of the Year. Riley also copped the 2011 Youth View Award for Cultural Artiste of the Year.

Riley released the acoustic album Mecoustic in 2012 and toured Europe in support of it with his Blak Soil band.

He worked with saxophonist and producer Dean Fraser on his 2014 album Love Situation, which he described as "a true tribute to the rocksteady era", and features guest appearances from U-Roy, Big Youth, Konshens and Mr. Cheeks. The album gave Riley his first number-one placing on the Billboard Reggae Albums chart in February 2014.

Riley was featured on Major Lazer's song "Powerful", from the 2015 album Peace Is the Mission, along with Ellie Goulding.

In 2020, Riley collaborated with male producer Rvssian and female dancehall artist Shenseea on the song "Lighter", which emerged as one of his biggest hits in the Caribbean and their native country Jamaica.

== Awards and nominations ==
- 2007: Jamaica Observer Artiste of the Year
- 2008: Excellence in Music and Entertainment (EME) Awards – Cultural Artiste of the Year (nominated), Male Vocalist of Year Award, Song of The Year ("She's Royal")
- 2008: Reggae Academy Awards – Best Reggae Song, Most Popular Song (both for "She's Royal"), Best Solo Male Vocal Performance, Breakthrough Reggae Artiste
- 2009: Caribbean-American Heritage Awards – Reggae Runnins Caribbean Heritage Award
- 2009: MOBO Awards – Best Reggae (nominated)
- 2009: Soul Train Music Awards – Best Reggae Artist (nominated)
- 2011: EME - Excellence in Music and Entertainment (Jamaica)- Cultural Artiste of the Year and Vocalist of the Year (Male)
- 2011: Youth View Awards (YVA's) – Cultural Artiste of the Year
- 2011: UNIA Marcus Garvey Award – For Contribution of Music
- 2014: MOBO Awards – Best Reggae Act (nominated)

== Discography ==
- Challenges (2004), VP
- Parables (2006), VP
- Contagious (2009), VP
- Mecoustic (2012), VP
- Love Situation (2014), Zojak World Wide
- Healing (2020), JukeBoxx Productions/Zojak World Wide
