= Project Success =

Studio album by Dogbowl
- Released: December 8, 1993
- Recorded: 1993
- Studio: Noise New Jersey (Jersey City, NJ)
- Genre: Psychedelic pop
- Length: 48:26
- Label: Shimmy Disc
- Producer: Kramer

Dogbowl chronology
Flan (1992)	Project Success (1993)	Hot Day in Waco (1994)

Professional ratings
Review scores
Source	Rating
Allmusic	4/5 stars

Project Success is the fourth studio album by Dogbowl, released on December 8, 1993 by Shimmy Disc.

== Track listing ==
All tracks are written by Dogbowl.

No.	Title	Length
1.	"Windmills Falling"	4:21
2.	"Train Goes Away"	2:42
3.	"Hemophiliac of Love"	3:18
4.	"Concrete Table of Love"	3:24
5.	"Going Out on a Date (With a Girl That You Like)"	1:35
6.	"Steamboat"	3:01
7.	"Thinking of Omaha"	3:26
8.	"Reeperbahn"	3:52
9.	"Stalker"	3:54
10.	"Without You"	3:13
11.	"Kind of Girl"	2:44
12.	"Delightful Day"	2:29
13.	"Harmonica"	3:40
14.	"Red Rug"	3:22
15.	"I Pick Daisies"	3:25

== Personnel ==
Adapted from Flan liner notes.

- Dogbowl – lead vocals, guitar, illustrations

Musicians

- Sean Eden – guitar
- Race Age – drums, percussion
- Lee Ming Tah – bass guitar, steel guitar
- Christopher Tunney – clarinet, saxophone

Production and additional personnel

- Jamie Harley – engineering
- Kramer – production
- Michael Macioce – photography

== Release history ==
Region	Date	Label	Format	Catalog
United States	1993	Shimmy Disc	CD, LP	shimmy 063
