= Dogbowl =

American artist, musician and novelist

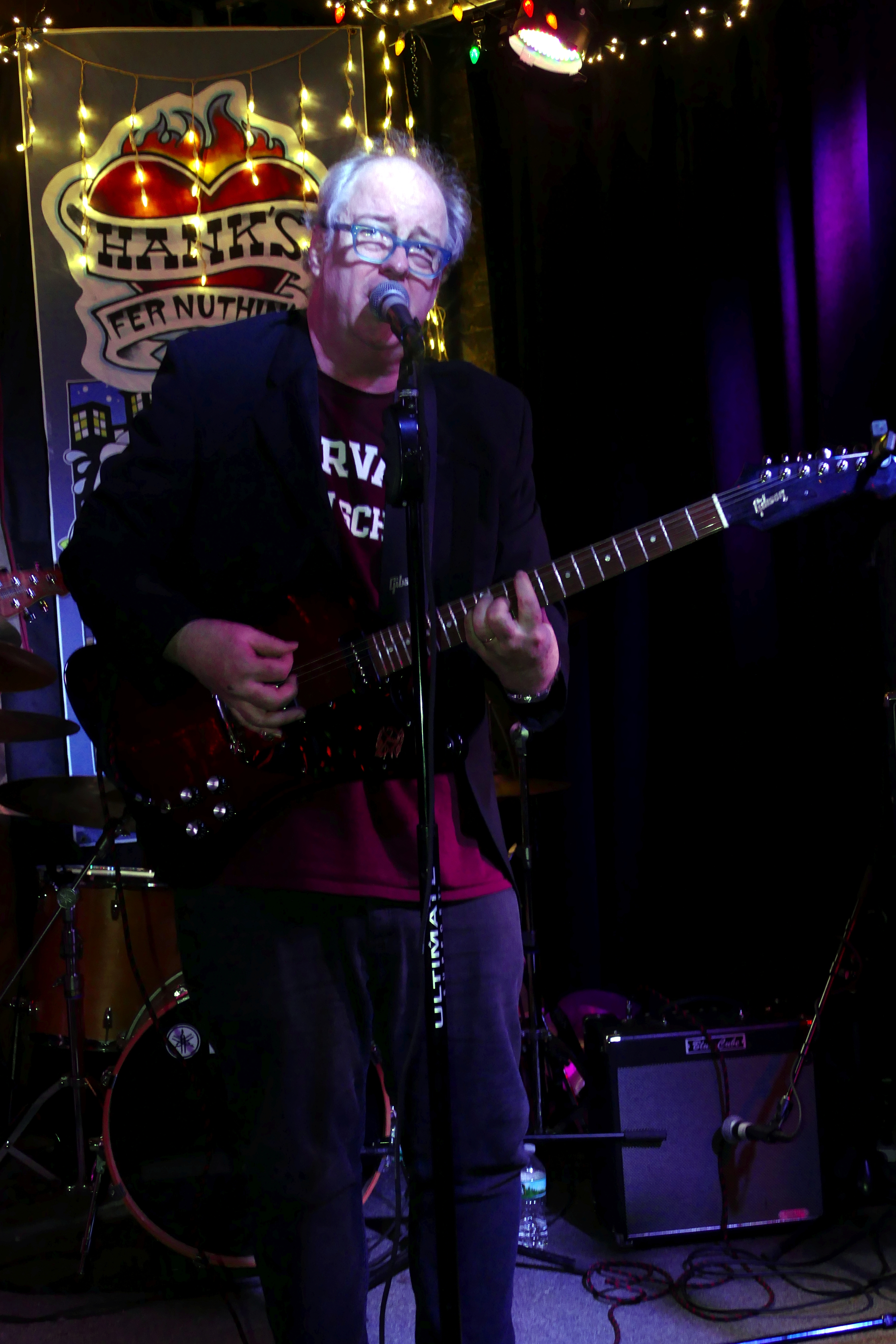
- Dogbowl performing in 2019

Background information
- Birth name: Stephen Tunney
- Genres: Psychedelic rock
- Instrument(s): Guitar, vocals
- Labels: Shimmy Disc; Lithium Records; Eyeball Planet; 62TV Records; Needlejuice Records
- Website: stephentunney.org

Stephen Tunney, also known as Dogbowl, is an American artist, musician and novelist. He is a founding member of the avant-garde band King Missile (Dog Fly Religion), and has recorded many albums as a solo act.

He is also the author of two novels, the surreal, post-apocalyptic Flan, published in 1992 by Four Walls Eight Windows, and One Hundred Percent Lunar Boy, published in 2010 by MacAdam/Cage. One Hundred Percent Lunar Boy takes place on a terraformed Moon two thousand years in the future and chronicles the misadventures of sixteen-year-old Hieronymus Rexaphin, a boy who can see the fourth primary color, and the trouble he gets into after showing his unusual eyes to a teenage tourist girl from Earth.

== Personal ==
Stephen Tunney graduated from Parsons School of Design with a BFA in 1982. He received an MFA from the City College of New York in 1991. He currently lives in New York City.

== Writing ==
Stephen Tunney's novel One Hundred Percent Lunar Boy, published by MacAdam/Cage in 2010 is a recipient of the Barnes & Noble "Discover Great New Writers Series" for the Holiday Season 2010-2011. One Hundred Percent Lunar Boy was translated into French and published in France in Fall 2011 by the French publisher Éditions Albin Michel. One Hundred Percent Lunar Boy is Stephen Tunney's second novel. He published Flan (1992, Four Walls Eight Windows; re-published in 2008 by Running Press). Flan was widely reviewed and appraised by magazines and newspapers such as New York Press, Boston Phoenix Literary Section, Review of Contemporary Fiction, Option, and the San Francisco Chronicle among others.

== Discography ==
- Tit! An Opera (1989)
- Cyclops Nuclear Submarine Captain (1991)
- Flan (1992)
- Project Success (1993)
- The Zeppelin Record (1998)
- Fantastic Carburetor Man (2001)
- Songs for Narcisse (2005)
- Zone of Blue (2015)

== Painting ==
Stephen Tunney, trained as a painter, works in the tradition of Renaissance artist who masters three different fields. He has exhibited widely in the United States as well as Europe, France, Switzerland, England, Belgium and Spain.
