= 62TV Records =

- Parent company: PIAS
- Founder: Pierre Van Braekel; Philippe Decoster; Nico Hammiche
- Distributor(s): Bang! Music
- Genre: Indie pop; indie rock
- Country of origin: Belgium
- Location: Braine-le-Comte
- Official website: www.62tvrecords.com

62TV Records is an independent record label based in Brussels, Belgium. The label specializes in artists of various subgenres of indie pop and is distributed by Bang! Music.

== Artists ==
- Austin Lace
- Flexa Lyndo
- Fonda 500
- Girls in Hawaii
- Hallo Kosmo
- Lucy Lucy!
- Minerale
- Sharko
- The Tellers

== See also ==
- List of record labels
