= List of Belgian bands and artists =

A list of Belgian bands and artists of all time periods. The bands and artists are either Belgian, of Belgian origin or contain Belgian members.

== 0-9 ==
- 2 Belgen
- 2 Fabiola
- 2 Many DJ's
- 2 Unlimited

== A ==
- à;GRUMH...
- Christian Adam
- ABN
- Aborted
- A Brand
- Absolute Body Control
- Jean Absil
- Absynthe Minded
- Jean-Baptiste Accolay
- Salvatore Adamo
- Adèle Colson
- Charlotte Adigéry
- Admiral Freebee
- Kathleen Aerts
- Philippe Aerts
- Agathocles
- Aka Moon
- Aksak Maboul
- Alice on the Roof
- Allez Allez
- Amatorski
- Ameerah
- Amenra
- Amnesia
- Amorroma
- Annagrace
- Ancient Rites
- Angèle
- Arbeid Adelt!
- Arid
- Arkham
- Geike Arnaert
- Arno
- Aroma di Amore
- Arsenal
- Marc Aryan
- A Split-Second
- Astroline
- Natacha Atlas
- Katerine Avgoustakis
- Axelle Red
- Dina Ayada

== B ==
- Bai Kamara Jr
- Emma Bale
- Balthazar
- Santo Barracato
- Samir Barris
- Typh Barrow
- Claude Barzotti
- Basto!
- Francis Bay
- Bazart
- Julos Beaucarne
- Roberto Bellarosa
- Benny B
- Bob Benny
- Bernthøler
- Gert Bettens
- Sam Bettens
- Betty Goes Green
- André Bialek
- Blackwave
- Burt Blanca
- Blanche
- Blu Samu
- Jeff Bodart
- CJ Bolland
- Boogie Belgique
- Vina Bovy
- André Brasseur
- Jacques Brel
- Tina Bride
- BRNS
- Brussels Jazz Orchestra
- Brutal Sphincter
- Brutus
- Bryan Mg
- Buscemi
- The Black Box Revelation
- The Breath of Life

== C ==
- Camille
- Sarah Carlier
- Carnation
- Cartouche
- Fabrizio Cassol
- Philip Catherine
- Jonatan Cerrada
- The Chakachas
- Channel Zero
- Charles
- Chérine
- Chow-Chow
- Ann Christy
- Johannes Ciconia
- The Clement Peerens Explosition
- Clouseau
- Club Moral
- Coely
- Robert Cogoi
- Compact Disk Dummies
- Confetti's
- Coone
- Annie Cordy
- Corina
- Tony Corsari
- Cos
- Ronny Coutteure
- Crazy Horse
- Cré Tonnerre
- Koen Crucke
- Crystal & Runnin' Wild
- Customs

== D ==
- D.H.T.
- Daan
- DAAU/Die Anarchistische Abendunterhaltung
- Damso
- Danger Hardcore Team
- Danzel
- Das Pop
- Charles de Bériot
- Mélanie De Biasio
- Silvy De Bie
- Wim De Craene
- Kris De Bruyne
- De Elegasten
- De Kreuners
- Felix de Laet – known as Lost Frequencies
- De Lama's
- Pierre de Maere
- De Mens
- Philippe de Monte
- Eva De Roovere
- Cipriano de Rore
- De Strangers
- De Vaganten
- Jan De Wilde
- Dead Hollywood Stars
- Dead Man Ray
- Kris Defoort, Kris Defoort Quartet
- Dean Delannoit
- James Deano
- Carlo Deman
- Lou Deprijck
- Bob Dechamps
- Josquin Desprez
- Niels Destadsbader
- dEUS
- Maarten Devoldere
- Danny Devos
- Jodie Devos
- Raymond Devos
- Frédéric Devreese
- Barbara Dex
- Diablo Blvd
- Tom Dice
- Mike Dierickx
- Dimitri Vegas & Like Mike
- Dive
- DJ F.R.A.N.K.
- Clément Doucet
- Douglas Firs
- Dream Express
- Driving Dead Girl
- Guillaume Dufay
- William Dunker
- Jacques Duvall

== E ==
- Lavvi Ebbel
- DJ Elephant Power
- Ellie Delvaux
- Elmore D
- Roméo Elvis
- Enthroned
- Equal Idiots
- Jo Erens
- Jasper Erkens
- Ertebrekers
- La Esterella
- Été 67
- Evil Superstars
- Peter Evrard
- Experimental tropic blues band

== F ==
- Lara Fabian
- Will Ferdy
- Fifty Foot Combo
- Fixkes
- Flat Earth Society
- Flatcat
- Fleddy Melculy
- Jean-Luc Fonck allias Sttellla
- César Franck
- Ray Franky
- Freaky Age
- Frédéric François
- Frenetik
- Jimmy Frey
- Front 242
- Fud Candrix

== G ==
- Frank Galan
- Stéphane Galland
- Ganja White Night
- Yvonne George
- Bene Gesserit
- Ghinzu
- Johan Gielen
- Stéphane Ginsburgh
- Girls in Hawaii
- Glints
- The Go Find
- nl:Good Shape
- Sam Gooris
- Goose
- Erik Goossens
- Gorki
- Rita Gorr
- Gotye
- Francis Goya
- Rocco Granata
- Grand Jojo
- Greetings from Mercury
- Ferre Grignard
- Arthur Grumiaux
- Gustaph
- Guusje
- Gwyllion

== H ==
- Hadise
- Hamza
- Michel Hatzigeorgiou
- Helena
- Henri PFR
- Bart Herman
- Michel Herr
- Ivan Heylen
- The Hickey Underworld
- Axel Hirsoux
- 't Hof van Commerce
- Hoquets
- The Honeymoon Killers
- Hooverphonic
- Vitor Hublot
- Jacques Hustin

== I ==
- The Immortals
- Ingeborg
- Intergalactic Lovers
- Irish Coffee
- Isabelle A
- Isbells
- Ithilien

== J ==
- Jali
- Janez Detd
- Bobby Jaspar
- JeanJass
- JauneOrange
- Jeronimo
- Jess & James
- Chris Joris
- Junior Jack
- Juul Kabas

== K ==
- K3
- Kabouter Plop
- Bart Kaëll
- Kamagurka
- Kid Montana
- The Kids
- Sandra Kim
- Bony King
- Klakkebusse
- Klinik
- Flip Kowlier
- Sylvie Kreusch
- K's Choice
- Sigiswald Kuijken

== L ==
- Yvan Lacomblez
- Lady Linn
- Claire Laffut
- Philippe Lafontaine
- Laïs
- John Larry
- Lasgo
- Isolde Lasoen
- Orlandus Lassus
- Viktor Lazlo
- Lea Rue
- Les Gauff'
- Les Snuls
- Jo Leemans
- Pierre Leemans
- Leez
- Leki
- Jo Lemaire
- Helena Lemkovitch
- Amelie Lens
- Leopold 3
- Léopold Nord & Vous
- Jacques Lippe
- Les Tueurs de la Lune de Miel
- Jan Leyers
- Vincent Liben
- Lia Linda
- David Linx
- Lio
- J.J. Lionel
- Claude Lombard
- Charles Loos
- Lords of Acid
- Nathalie Loriers, Brussels Jazz Orchestra
- Lost Frequencies
- Helmut Lotti
- Lou and The Hollywood Bananas
- Lous and the Yakuza
- Lunascape
- Laura Lynn

== M ==
- M.I.K.E.
- Mâäk's Spirit
- Machiavel
- Mad Curry
- Sven Maes
- Magnus
- Jérémie Makiese
- Malibu Stacy
- Mama's Jasje
- Alec Mansion
- Micha Marah
- Marble Sounds
- Marka
- Lize Marke
- Marva
- Michel Massot
- Maurane
- Simone Max
- Meltheads
- Martin-Joseph Mengal
- Mentissa
- Wim Mertens
- Milo Meskens
- Meskerem Mees
- Guilielmus Messaus
- Metejoor
- Metroland
- Frank Michael
- Paul Michiels
- Milk Inc.
- Millionaire
- Milow
- Mindgames
- Mint
- Mintzkov
- Karel Miry
- Green Montana
- Montevideo
- Marc Morgan
- Marc Moulin
- Mud Flow
- Mustii
- My Little Cheap Dictaphone

== N ==
- Nacht und Nebel
- Nailpin
- The Names
- Naragonia
- Natalia
- Connie Neefs
- Günther Neefs
- Louis Neefs
- Nemo
- The Neon Judgement
- Netsky
- Jef Neve
- Noa Moon
- Helena Noguerra
- Nonkel Bob
- Noordkaap
- Loïc Nottet
- Novastar

== O ==
- Vidna Obmana
- Olivia
- Franck Olivier
- Laura Omloop
- Patrick Onzia
- Wim Opbrouck
- Oscar and the Wolf
- Ostrogoth
- Patrick Ouchène
- Ozark Henry

== P ==
- Paradisio
- Pas de Deux
- Mauro Pawlowski
- The Pebbles
- Bart Peeters
- Alix Perez
- Belle Perez
- An Pierlé
- Placebo – frontman Brian Molko was born in Belgium
- Placebo – Belgian band (leader Marc Moulin)
- Plastic Bertrand – "Ça Plane pour Moi"
- Pleasure Game
- Polyphonic Size
- Praga Khan
- Present
- Bobby Prins
- Psy'Aviah
- Psychonaut
- Puggy
- Bolis Pupul

== R ==
- The Radios
- Rafflesia
- Pierre Rapsat
- Hugo Raspoet
- Raxola
- Jacques Raymond
- Red Zebra
- Regi
- Django Reinhardt
- Renaissance
- Revolting Cocks
- Joseph Reynaerts
- Gabriel Ríos
- Jerry Ropero
- Perry Rose
- Rum (band)
- Kate Ryan

== S ==
- Sadi
- Jean Bosco Safari
- Safi & Spreej
- Liliane Saint-Pierre
- Thor Salden
- Samson & Gert
- Dan San
- Tony Sandler
- Saule
- The Scabs
- Bobbejaan Schoepen
- School is Cool
- Salim Seghers
- Selah Sue
- Jack Sels
- Sennek
- Seppe Gebruers
- Henri Seroka
- Adrien-François Servais
- Tony Servi
- Paul Severs
- Shameboy
- Good Shape
- Sharko
- Shay
- Siglo XX
- Sir Yes Sir
- Soeur Sourire
- Soldout
- Willy Sommers
- Sonar
- Sons
- The Sore Losers
- Free Souffriau
- Soulsister
- Soulwax
- Wim Soutaer
- Spoil Engine
- Willy Staquet
- Starflam
- Stash
- Steak Number Eight
- Luc Steeno
- Jonas Steur
- Steve Houben
- Jasper Steverlinck
- Stikstof
- Jacques Stotzem
- Stromae
- Sttellla
- Styrofoam
- Suarez
- The Subs
- Suicide Commando
- Art Sullivan
- SX
- Sylvain Vanholme
- Sylver

== T ==
- T99
- Tamino
- Taste of Sugar
- TC Matic
- Team William
- Technotronic
- Telex
- The Tellers
- John Terra
- Laura Tesoro
- The Bet
- The Bowling Balls
- The Child of Lov
- The Cousins
- The Dinky Toys
- The Haunted Youth
- The Honeymoon Killers
- The Jokers
- The Setup
- The Starlings
- The Van Jets
- Toots Thielemans
- Pommelien Thijs
- Gene Thomas
- René Thomas
- Thou
- Thurisaz
- Timothy
- Tonia
- Tony Servi & Corina
- Sacha TooropSacha Toorop
- Tourist LeMC
- Toy
- Tragic Error
- Triggerfinger
- Trio Dhoore
- Rudy Trouvé
- Will Tura
- Two Man Sound

== U ==
- Udo
- Ulrikes Dream
- UndaCova
- Univers Zéro
- Urban Trad
- Urbanus

== V ==
- Frank Vaganée
- Jean Vallée
- Jo Vally
- Paul Van Bruystegem
- Roland van Campenhout
- Jelle van Dael
- Ian Van Dahl
- José van Dam
- Wannes Van de Velde
- Bea Van der Maat
- Pierre Van Dormael
- Sven Van Hees
- Jeroen Van Herzeele
- Raymond van het Groenewoud
- Fred Van Hove
- Peter Van Laet
- Tom Van Landuyt
- Jimmy Van M
- Stan Van Samang
- Wallace Vanborn
- Marcel Vanthilt
- Zjef Vanuytsel
- Vaya Con Dios
- Venus
- Venus In Flames
- Peter Verhoyen
- Guy Verlinde
- Willem Vermandere
- Erik Vermeulen
- Johan Verminnen
- Christian Vidal
- Henri Vieuxtemps
- Lily Vincent
- Gus Viseur
- Vismets
- Vive la Fête

== W ==
- Wallace Collection
- Eddy Wally
- Warhaus
- Marie Warnant
- Jean-Claude Watrin
- Koen Wauters
- Whispering Sons
- Johnny White
- Trixie Whitley
- Miguel Wiels
- Will Z.
- Steve Willaert
- Dana Winner

== X ==
- Xandee
- X!NK
- X-Legged Sally

== Y ==
- Ya Kid K
- Yamasuki
- Yasmine
- Yel
- YevgueniYevgueni
- Yves V
- Yolande Moreau
- Eugène Ysaÿe

== Z ==
- Zap Mama
- Jacques Zegers
- Zita Swoon
- Zop Hopop
- Zornik
