= Folk Dranouter =

Belgian music festival

Folkfestival Dranouter

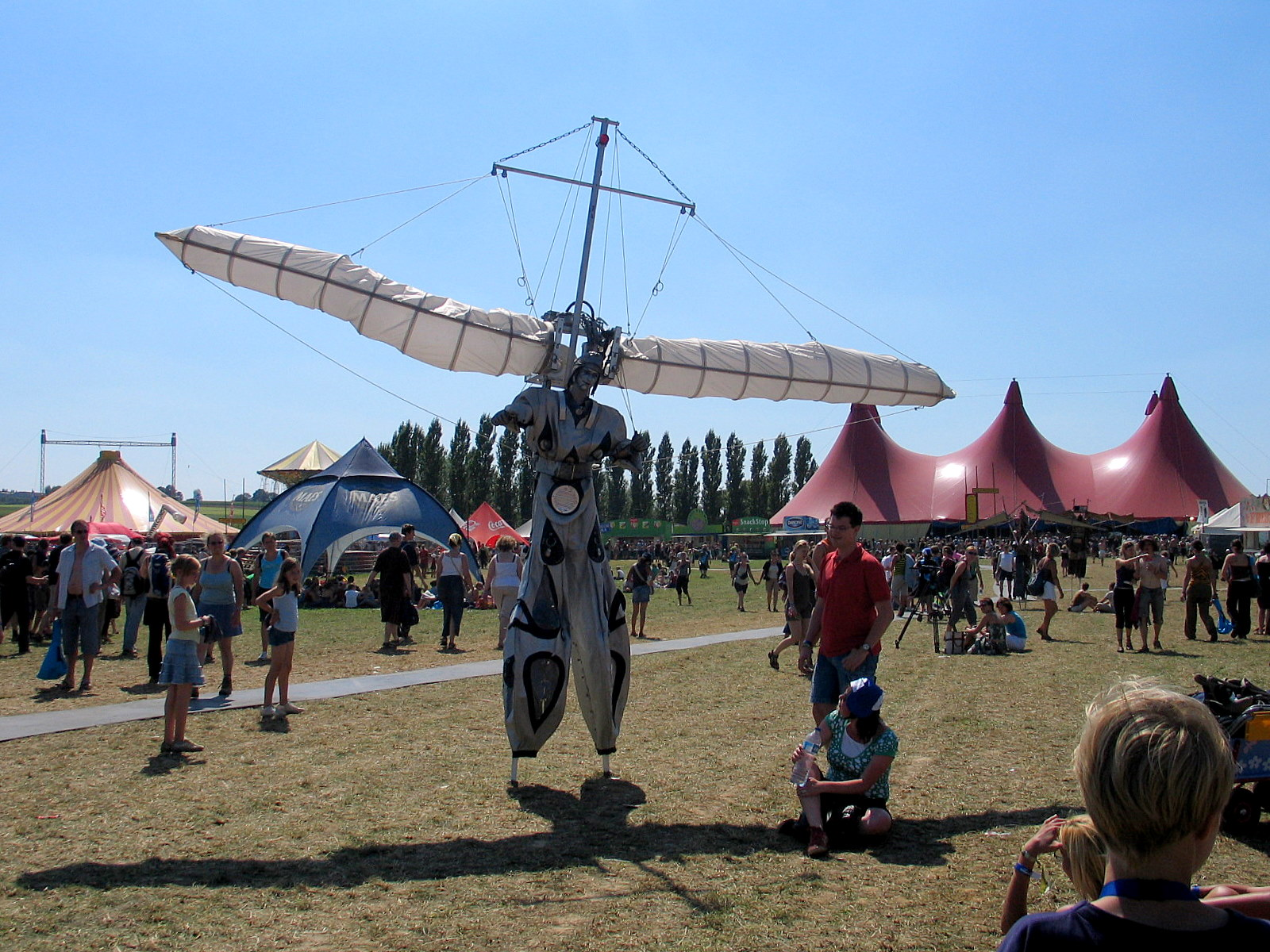
- Stilt walker at Folk Dranouter 2007
- Genre: Folk, pop, world music
- Dates: Early August
- Locations: Dranouter, Belgium
- Years active: 1975–present
- Website: http://www.folkdranouter.be/

Folk Dranouter is a yearly folk festival spanning four days at the beginning of August in the Belgian village of Dranouter. Since 2005, a second, smaller festival, Dranouter aan zee (Dranouter at sea) is organised in De Panne on the beach near the end of April.

== History ==
Created in 1975 by the people of the youth club "De Zon", the first festival showed eight groups on one day with the Albion Morris Men as headliners, and had some 300 visitors. By 1977, the festival had specialized in folk music and got some 1,000 visitors. After a few more years of growth, the festival reached a stable audience of three- to five thousand visitors throughout the 1980s.

From the end of the 1980s on, the festival started programming other genres like world music (with Miriam Makeba in 1989) and singer-songwriters (with Billy Bragg in 1988), and included some more well-known names. The audience increased to some 45,000 people in 1995 and 65,000 in 1997.

In 1997 and 1998, Dranouter won the ZAMU award for best musical event.

== Folk museum ==
In the wake of the festival, a museum of folk music also opened in Dranouter.

== Artists ==
Famous artists who performed in Dranouter over the years include:

=== 1975–1987 ===
- Derroll Adams (1976, 1981, 1991)
- Wannes Van de Velde (1977, 1979, 1982, 1987, 1996)
- Dick Gaughan (1979)
- Paddy Glackin (1982)
- Fairport Convention (1983, 1993, 2000)
- The Chieftains (1983, 1997, 2000, 2009)
- Alan Stivell (1983, 1989, 1994, 2000, 2004)
- The Dubliners (1984, 1991)
- Brenda Wootton (1985)
- Ossian (1985)
- Zachary Richard (1985)
- Kate & Anna McGarrigle (1986, 1995)
- Flaco Jiménez (1986)
- John Prine (1987)
- Steeleye Span (1987, 1994, 1999)

=== 1988 ===
- Mary Coughlan & Band
- Ralph McTell
- Billy Bragg (also 1993, 2008, 2014)
- Malicorne
- Rory McLeod (also 1994) & Kathryn Tickell
- Dónal Lunny (also 1998) & Liam O'Flynn

=== 1989 ===
- Miriam Makeba
- Richard Thompson (also 1992, 2000, 2009, 2014)
- Alan Stivell
- Soldat Louis
- Värttinä

=== 1990 ===
- Donovan
- Johannes Kerkorrel (also 1997, 2002)
- June Tabor
- Luka Bloom (also 1994, 2006, 2011)
- Rory Block

=== 1991 ===
- Dan Ar Braz
- Melanie (also 1995)
- Suzanne Vega (also 1997, 2002, 2008)

=== 1992 ===
- Christy Moore (also 1994, 2005)
- Geoffrey Oryema
- Kirsty MacColl
- Les Négresses Vertes (also 2007)
- Marianne Faithfull (also 2005)
- Pentangle
- Värttinä (also 1997, 2002, 2008)
- Zap Mama (also 1995, 2006)

=== 1993 ===
- Altan (also 1997, 2007)
- Cesária Évora
- Indigo Girls (also 2002)
- Loreena McKennitt (also 2008)
- Michelle Shocked
- Mikis Theodorakis
- The Pogues (also 2010)

=== 1994 ===
- Lloyd Cole
- Joan Baez
- Guo Yue
- Eleanor McEvoy
- Angelo Branduardi
- Khaled

=== 1995 ===
Sources:

- Ry Cooder & David Lindley (with Joachim Cooder and Rosanna Lindley) (USA)
- Los Lobos (USA)
- Kate & Anna McGarrigle (Canada)
- Melanie (USA)
- Zap Mama (Zaire)
- Mary Black (Ireland)
- Shawn Colvin (USA)
- Songhai (Mali/Spain/Great Britain)
- Giora Feidman (USA)
- Gabriel Yacoub (France)
- Shane MacGowan and The Popes (Great Britain)
- Taraf de Haïdouks (Romania)
- Khadja Nin (Burundi)
- Jo Lemaire (Belgium)
- The Equation (Great Britain)
- Cordelia's Dad (USA)
- JPP (Finland)

=== 1996 ===
- Elvis Costello
- Emmylou Harris (also 2006)
- Yannis Markopoulos (also 2004)
- Clannad
- Cowboy Junkies
- Maria McKee
- Janis Ian
- Huun-Huur-Tu (also 2003)
- Cassandra Wilson
- The Corrs
- Ani di Franco

=== 1997 ===
- Sinéad O'Connor (also 2007)
- The Levellers (also 1999, 2003, 2007)
- Noa
- Axelle Red (also 2000, 2007)
- Mari Boine
- Hedningarna
- Davy Spillane
- Afro Celt Sound System (also 1999)
- Beth Orton (also 1998, 2003)

=== 1998 ===
- Ali Farka Touré
- Kodo
- Heather Nova
- Patti Smith
- Dulce Pontes
- Van Morrison
- Martha Wainwright (also 2008)
- Donal Lunny
- Lunasa
- The Nits

=== 1999 ===
- I Muvrini
- Nick Cave
- Baaba Maal
- Rubén González
- James Taylor
- John Hiatt
- Värttinä
- Kepa Junkera
- Afro Celt Sound System
- Shooglenifty

=== 2000 ===
- Mediæval Bæbes
- 16 Horsepower
- Lou Reed (also 2005)
- Robert Plant

=== 2001 ===
- Novastar (also 2005, 2009, 2014)
- Paul Weller
- Youssou N'Dour
- Capercaillie
- The Waterboys
- Neil Finn
- Luar na Lubre
- Admiral Freebee (also 2003, 2007)
- Flip Kowlier (also 2003, 2005, 2009, 2014)
- Maddy Prior

=== 2002 ===
- Patti Smith
- Ray Davies
- Buena Vista Social Club (also 2005)
- Femi Kuti
- Hothouse Flowers

=== 2003 ===
- Hooverphonic (also 2006)
- Gotan Project
- Linda Thompson
- Daniel Lanois
- Arno (also 2007)
- Elliott Murphy
- Gabriel Ríos (also 2006, 2008, 2014)

=== 2004 ===
- Starsailor (also 2007)
- Calexico
- Goran Bregović
- Moya Brennan
- The Skatalites
- Under byen
- Daan (also 2006, 2010)

=== 2005 ===
- Yann Tiersen
- Jah Wobble
- The Proclaimers
- Lou Reed

=== 2006 ===
- Ed Harcourt
- John Cale
- Lambchop
- Jamie Cullum
- John Parish

=== 2007 ===
- Isobel Campbell
- Mark Lanegan
- Lisa Germano

=== 2008 ===
- Tori Amos
- Howe Gelb

=== 2009 ===
- K's Choice
- Travis
- CocoRosie
- Flogging Molly
- Milow
- Iva Bittová

=== 2010 ===
- Tom McRae
- Nouvelle Vague
- Paolo Conte
- Absynthe Minded
- Staff Benda Bilili
- Vaya Con Dios
- La Bottine Souriante
- James Walsh
- Anouk
- Tindersticks
- dEUS
- Joan as Police Woman
- Carolina Chocolate Drops
- Harper Simon
- Solomon Burke & The Souls Alive Orchestra with Special Guest Joss Stone
