= Baloji (rapper) =

Belgian rapper (born 1978)

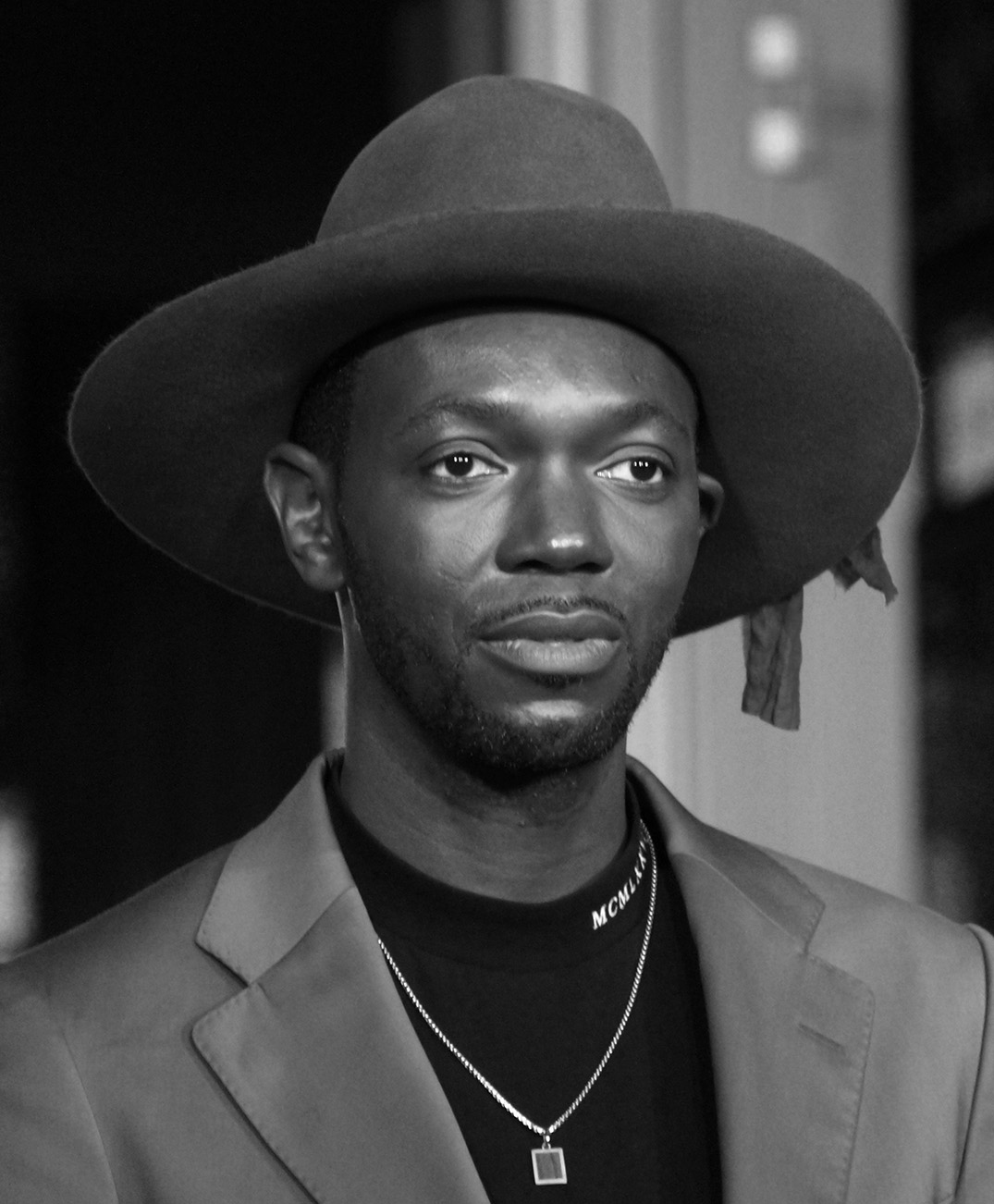
- Baloji in 2020

Background information
- Born: 1978 (age 47–48); Lubumbashi, Zaïre (now Democratic Republic of the Congo)
- Genres: Pop rap, hip-hop, soul, Afrobeat
- Occupations: Rapper, singer, songwriter, film director
- Years active: 1998–present
- Labels: Discipline, Warner Music / EMI (with Starflam)
- Formerly of: Starflam
- Website: baloji.com

Baloji (born 1978), also known as MC Balo, is a rapper, singer, and film director. Of Congolese origin, he has lived in Belgium since he was a young child. Known as MC Balo as part of the hip-hop group Starflam, he went on to pursue a career as a solo artist in 2008. His 2023 film Omen premiered at Cannes in the Un Certain Regard section, where it won the New Voice Prize, and became an international critical success. It was the Belgian entry for Best International Feature Film at the 96th Academy Awards.

== Early life and career ==
Baloji was born in Lubumbashi, Zaïre (now Democratic Republic of the Congo, or DRC), in 1978. The name Baloji is a Swahili word meaning "man of science" in the pre-colonial era, later being corrupted by Belgian Christian evangelists to mean "sorcerer", or the equivalent of a demon. The name was a stigma that he had to overcome. Born out of wedlock to a Belgian father and Congolese mother, he was three or four years old when his father, without telling his mother, took him to live him in Liège, Belgium. He lost touch and did not reconnect with his mother until he was 29.

When Baloji was seven, his father moved back to the DRC, travelling back and forth over the coming years, while Baloji lived with his stepmother. At 14, Baloji lost all contact with his father, left home and dropped out of school. Baloji's love for poetry and the written word started around this time, eventually leading him into hip-hop. Performing under the name MC Balo, he joined the hip-hop collective H-Posse, eventually renamed Starflam, when he was 15 years old.

== Career ==
=== Music ===
Starflam, the band's self-titled debut album came out in 1998, and in 2001 when Baloji was 23, was followed by Survivant, which went platinum. Baloji's last album with Starflam was Donne moi de l'amour in 2003 before quitting the band the following year. Disillusioned following his breakup with Starflam, Baloji left the music scene for a few years before starting up his solo career in 2008.

In 2008, Baloji released his first solo album, Hotel Impala, a blend of hip-hop, soul, and Afrobeat. The album was for, and inspired by, his mother after reconnecting with her following a 25-year separation. Though his mother had written him letters over the years, he did not receive any until 2007. "From that point on, I felt like I had something to sing about in my songs. I wanted to recount the different slices of my life and explain everything that had happened to me from the moment I left the Congo to where I am today". The album, which included collaborations with Gabriel Rios and DJ duo The Glimmers was a commercial and critical success. It was Certified gold and won several awards including two Octaves de la musique, a Belgian music award; the Prix Rapsat-Lelièvre, a Canadian award presented to an artist from French-speaking Belgium; and the Prix Brassens des paroliers.

Baloji's sophomore album, Kinshasa Succursale (2011), was an inflection point in his musical journey, incorporating Congolese musical influences for the first time. Recorded over six days in Kinshasa, the album blends rap with the Congolese rhythm of collaborators that included Konono No. 1, Zaïko Langa Langa, and La chorale de la Grâce, among others.

64 Bits and Malachite followed in 2015 and137 Avenue Kaniama in 2018. Fusing Afrobeat, soul and rap, Kaniama was a 12-track commentary on how mobile phones are turning people into zombies, a theme of his award-winning 2019 short film Zombies.

=== Film ===
By 2012, Baloji had three film projects in development, but was unable to secure funding for them.

He self-financed four short films from 2018, when he completed the short fiction film Kaniama Show. Described by its director as "a fictional satire about the collusion of State and media powers in an unidentified African country" the film's cast includes fellow Congolese Eriq Ebouaney and Eric Kabongo. The following year he released Zombies, a 15-minute visual companion to Kaniama: The Yellow Version, a revised one-track version of his 2018 album 137 Avenue Kaniama. Among its awards, the film won the main award at the Oberhausen Short Film Festival and Best Short of the Year at the MUBI Audience Awards.

In 2019, Baloji stepped in front of the camera to star in the Belgian drama film Binti. The story tackles the issue of immigration and follows Binti (played by Baloji's real-life daughter), a young Congolese girl who lives with her father (Baloji) in Belgium without legal papers. Binti received four nominations at the 10th Magritte Awards, including Best Flemish Film and Most Promising Actor for Baloji.

In 2023, Baloji's feature film directorial debut, Omen, premiered at the Cannes Film Festival, where it won the Un Certain Regard New Voice Prize. It went on to become an international critical success, receiving several dozen nominations and winning awards that included Best African Feature at the Durban International Film Festival; the CineRebels Award at the Munich Film Festival; and Best First Feature at the Africa Movie Academy Awards. It was the Belgian entry for Best International Feature Film at the 96th Academy Awards (held in 2024). The film's soundtrack was released as a five-track EP with MCA Records in November 2023. Starring Rwandan-French actress Eliane Umuhire, the film had its Rwandan premiere in Kigali on 28 June 2024.

== Personal life ==
Baloji lives in Ghent, Belgium. He has one daughter.

== Discography ==
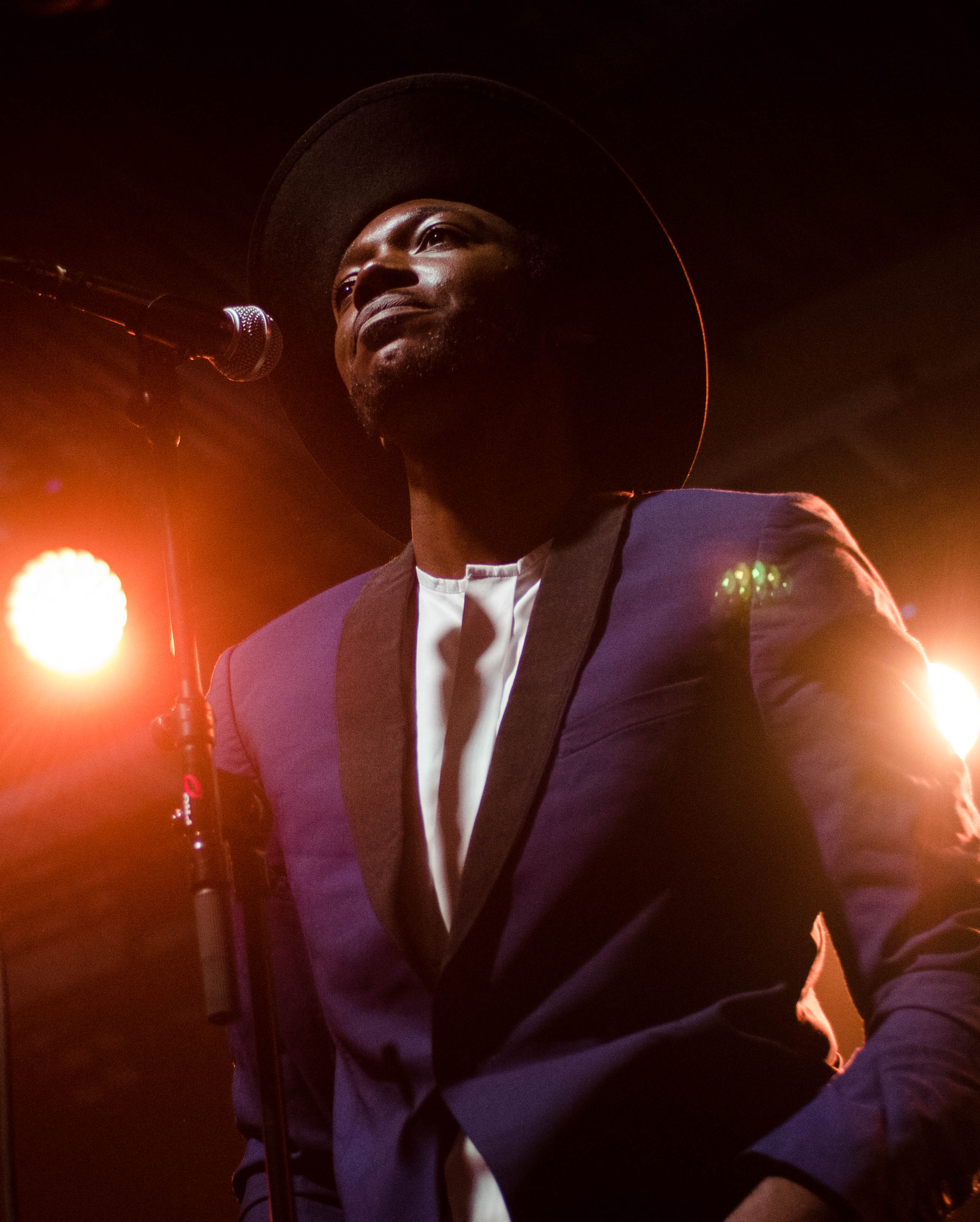
Baloji performing in 2016

=== Albums ===
As part of Starflam

- 1998: Starflam [Discipline Records / Rough Trade]
- 2000: Live & Direct [Warner Music Benelux]
- 2001: Survivant [Capitol/EMI]
- 2002: Survivant – Édition Spéciale (EMI)
- 2003: Donne moi de l'amour [Hostile/EMI]
- 2004: Donne moi de l'amour – Édition Deluxe (EMI)

Solo

- 2008: Hotel Impala
- 2011: Kinshasa Succursale
- 2015: 64 Bits and Malachite
- 2018: 137 Avenue Kaniama

== Maxis and singles ==
As part of Starflam

- 1997: "Corde raide" [12", Discipline Records]
- 1998: Ce plat pays II [12" & CD, Discipline Records]
- 2000: Bled runner [12" & CD, Warner Music Benelux]
- 2001: "De cause à effet" / "Ca tape dur" [12", Capitol / EMI]
- 2001: La Sonora [12 & CD, Capitol / EMI]
- 2001: Amnésie Internationale [12" & CD, Capitol / EMI]
- 2002: Sous pression [12" & CD, Capitol / EMI]
- 2003: "Marseille – Liège" / "Mr Orange" [12", Hostile / EMI]
- 2003: "Ils ne savent pas" [12", Hostile / EMI]

Featured in

- 2015: "La vie est belle / Life is Beautiful" (Petite Noir feat. Baloji)

== Filmography ==
Year	Title	Role	Notes
2011	Bullhead	Patrick	
2017	How Camels Become Lions	Baloji	
2019	Zombies		Director
2019	Binti	Jovial	Nominated–Magritte Award for Most Promising Actor
2023	Omen		Director, screenwriter
