= Herman (album) =

Studio album by 't Hof van Commerce
- Released: 1999
- Genre: Hip hop
- Label: Kinky Star

't Hof van Commerce chronology
En in Izzegem (1998)	Herman (1999)	Rocky 7 (2002)

Herman is the second album of the hip hop group 't Hof van Commerce.

== Track listing ==
1. "Kemmelberg 1983 AD" – 0:47
2. "Bus Ommegangk" – 3:53
3. "Mag et ntwa mjir zin" – 4:46
4. "Le mental en métal" – 4:43 (with Lickweed)
5. "Kust noa kust noa kust" – 4:30
6. "Situoatie 666" – 5:27 (with TLP)
7. "Gele Stylo" – 2:33
8. "De zeune van nboas" – 4:56
9. "De doagn van plezier" – 5:16 (with Stijn Nijs)
10. "Nostalgie Wereldbeker" – 4:45
11. "De zommer van 98" – 5:32
12. "Bol" – 4:50
13. "Alphonse en de Bjistjes" – 3:37
14. "Ze woare der nog nie grji voarn" – 5:40
15. "Ik e de zunne" – 5:31 (with NBM)
16. "De boane noa de zunne" – 4:36

== Personnel ==
't Hof van Commerce

- Flip Kowlier (beats, raps, instruments)
- Serge BZAa (rap)
- DJ 4T4 (beats, engineering, scratch, rap)

Guests

- Bietmeester Piet (beat, guitar, casio)
- U-man, Kra-Z, TLP, Stijn Nijs, NBM (rap)
