= Keep Quiet =

Keep Quiet may refer to:

== Music ==
- Keep Quiet (album), a 2012 album by Sons
- Keep Quiet, 2007 EP by Lab Partners
- "Keep Quiet", song from 2007 BarlowGirl album How Can We Be Silent
- "Keep Quiet", a song by the Protomen from their 2009 album Act II: The Father of Death
- "Keep Quiet", song from 2010 Hot Chip album One Life Stand

== Other uses ==
- Keep Quiet (film), a 2016 feature documentary by AJH Films and Passion Pictures
- Keep Quiet, a 2014 novel by Lisa Scottoline
