= Stuntman ('t Hof van Commerce album) =

Studio album by 't Hof van Commerce
- Released: 2012
- Genre: Hip Hop
- Label: Plasticine
- Producer: 't Hof van Commerce

't Hof van Commerce chronology
Ezoa en niet anders (2005)	Stuntman (2012)

Stuntman is the fifth album by 't Hof van Commerce. The album was released in 2012 after a remarkable 7-year pause of the band since their last album Ezoa en niet anders in 2005. The tone of the album is seen as less aggressive and more positive, as the main mc's (Serge Buyse and Flip Kowlier) have entered their 30s by the release of the album. Some songs (Iderjin is Goed, Kinders In Bedde) are directly putting the stress on the family life that the band members are currently having.

The album was generally well received, scoring 7,5/10 on VlaamseRap.be and 3 out of 4 stars on Humo.be.

== Track list ==
Below is the track list with a possible English translation of the title.

1. Stuntmann (Stuntmen)
2. Wupperbol (Bouncing ball)
3. Nie Normael (Not Normal)
4. Kwik Lik Pélé (Quick as Pélé)
5. Iderjin Is Goed (Everybody is Good)
6. Voe De Show (For the Show)
7. Kinders In Bedde (Children in Bed)
8. Baes (Boss)
9. Kletser Ip De Biln (Slapper on the buttocks)
10. Trappet Of (proverb for: go to hell)
11. Gie Teegn De Wereld (You against the world)
12. Wolfizer (Wolf trap)

== Charts ==
Chart (2012)	Peak position
Belgian Albums Chart (Flanders)	2
