= Live & Direct =

Live & Direct may refer to:

- Live & Direct (P Money album), 2016
- Live & Direct (Starflam album), 2000
- Live & Direct (Taj Mahal album), 1979
- Liveandirect, a 1989 album by Adamski
- Live + Direct, a 2002 album by Renaissance
