= Hans Aarsleff =

Danish linguist and academic (1925–2026)

Hans Christian Aarsleff
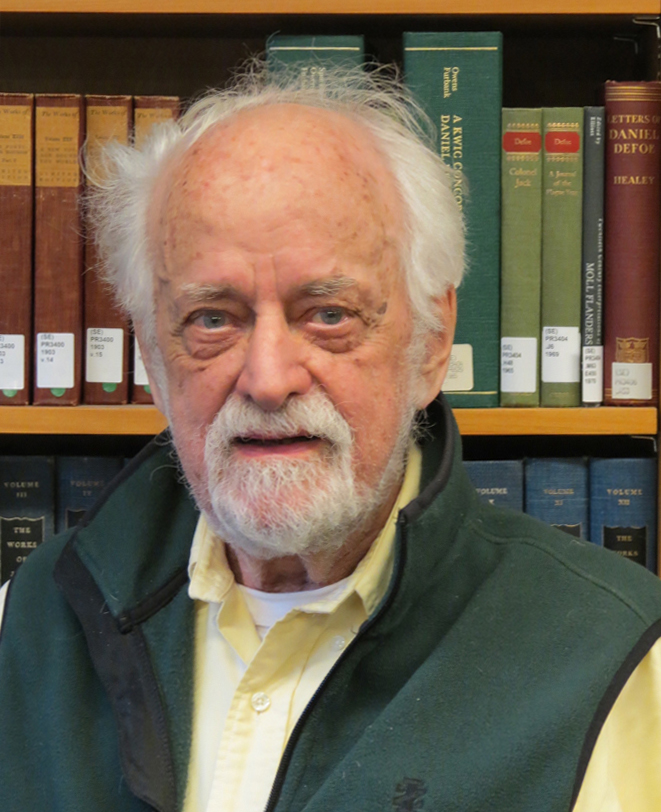
- Born: 19 July 1925; Rungsted, Denmark
- Died: 1 July 2026 (aged 100)
- Scientific career
- Fields: History of linguistics, the history of ideas, history of philosophy

Hans Christian Aarsleff (19 July 1925 – 1 July 2026) was a Danish linguist and academic, who has served as emeritus professor of English at Princeton University since 1997. Aarsleff was a specialist in the history of linguistics, the history of ideas, and the history of philosophy of the 17th, 18th, and 19th centuries.

== Life and career ==
After graduation from the gymnasium with distinction in 1943, majoring in science and mathematics, he studied English language and literature at the University of Copenhagen. In 1948 he gained a scholarship for graduate study at the University of Minnesota, where he spent the next eight years until he came to Princeton in 1956. His doctoral dissertation, "The Study of Language in England, 1780–1860", was completed in 1960. It was published by Princeton University Press in 1967 (re-issued 1983), and soon became a classic among historians of linguistics. He was a much sought-after guest speaker at many conferences and universities in and outside the United States. He stayed at Princeton, where he rose to the rank of full professor in 1972, for the rest of his career. He was elected to both the American Philosophical Society and the American Academy of Arts and Sciences in 1994.

Aarsleff suffered a stroke in 2021. He died on the morning of 1 July 2026, at the age of 100.

== Academic work ==
Right from the start, Aarsleff's work on the history of linguistics fanned out to cover the history of ideas, the history of philosophy, and the history of science, resulting in major essays on Leibniz, Locke, Condillac, Humboldt, Descartes, and Herder. In 1982, a selection of his essays was published under the title "From Locke to Saussure: Essays in the Study of Language and Intellectual History", again a high-profile publication in the field. Aarsleff also contributed a number of entries to Charles C. Gillispie's "The Dictionary of Scientific Biography", among which are major essays on John Wilkins and Thomas Sprat. In June 1991, a special conference was held in honor of Hans Aarsleff at the Sorbonne in Paris. This resulted in a festschrift "La linguistique entre mythe et histoire", edited by Daniel Droixhe and Chantal Grell (Münster: Nodus, 1993).

Aarsleff's writings on Wilhelm von Humboldt caused controversy as they drew attention to the fact that Humboldt was heavily influenced by French philosophers and linguists, which was denied by established German scholarship. His writings on the French-Swiss linguist Ferdinand de Saussure caused similar controversy, as he argued that Saussure's central ideas were strongly influenced by the French 19th-century philosopher-critic Hippolyte Taine, which was denied by Saussure scholars, who have shown that the ideas which Aarsleff attributes to Taine can be traced to other sources about whom Saussure himself wrote, whereas there is not a single reference to Taine in his vast writings, published and unpublished.

In 1970, Aarsleff published an article "The history of linguistics and Professor Chomsky" in the high-profile linguistic periodical Language. This article drew much attention as it was an attack on Noam Chomsky's much publicized work of the preceding years in the history of linguistics, contending that it was based on deficient and partisan scholarship. Although major specialists in the field were of the same opinion, the fierce and vilifying reactions by Chomsky and his followers made Aarsleff a controversial figure among Chomskyan theoretical linguists.

Among his major publications are:

- 1967. "The Study of Language in England, 1780–1860." Princeton: Princeton University Press.
- 1970. "The history of linguistics and Professor Chomsky." Language 46: 570–585.
- 1978. "Taine and Saussure." The Yale Review 68: 71–81.
- 1982. "From Locke to Saussure. Essays on the Study of Language and Intellectual History." London: University of Minnesota Press. London: The Athlone Press.
- 1988. "Introduction to 'On Language. Wilhelm von Humboldt: The Diversity of Human Language-Structure and its Influence on the Mental Development of Mankind', translated by Peter Heath with an introduction by Hans Aarsleff." Cambridge: Cambridge University Press.
- 2001. "Etienne Bonnot de Condillac, 'Essay on the Origin of Human Knowledge', translated and edited by Hans Aarsleff, with an introduction." Cambridge: Cambridge University Press.
