= Isolde Lasoen =

Belgian drummer and singer (born 1979)

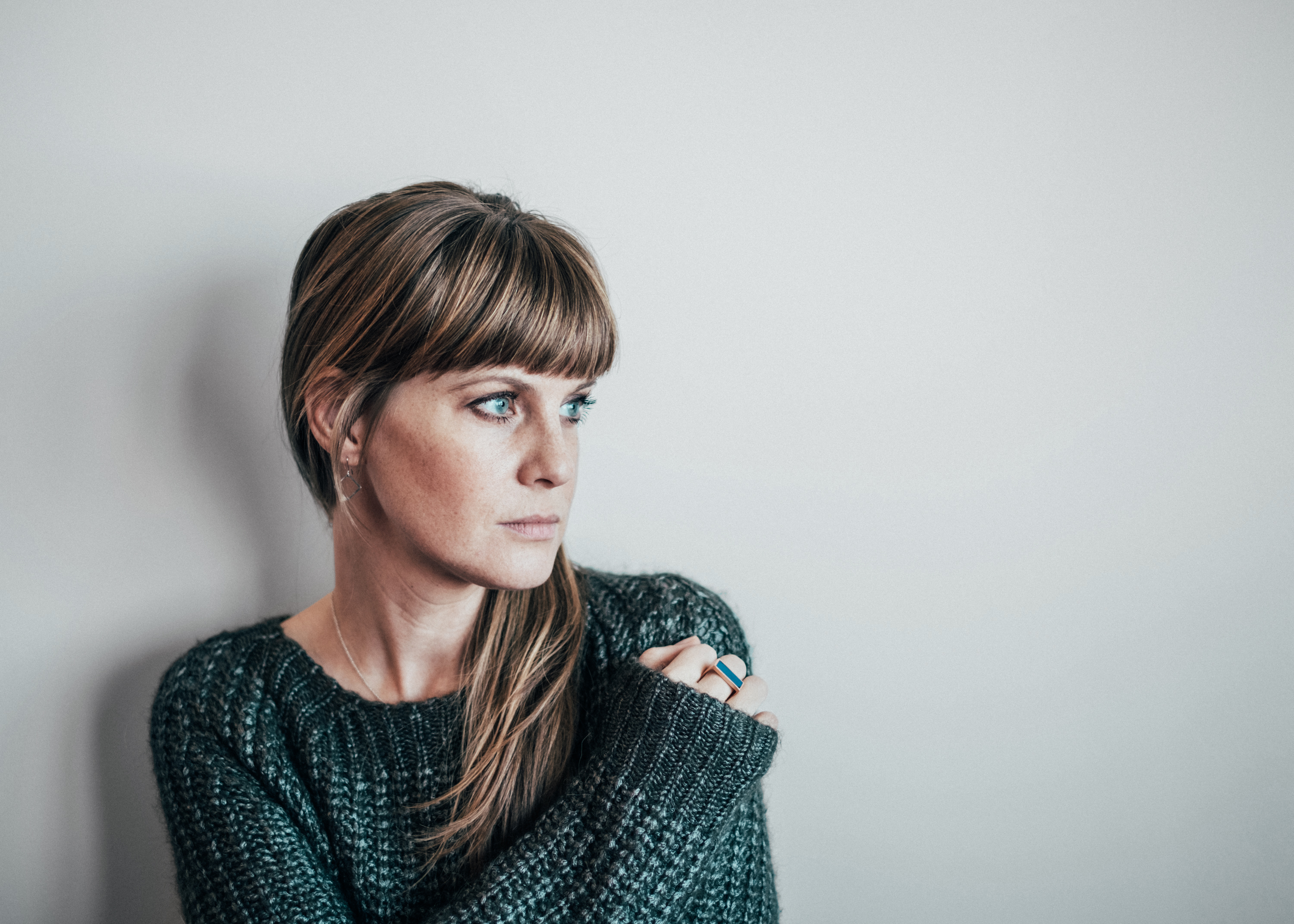
- Lasoen in 2017

Background information
- Born: 31 December 1979 (age 46); Bruges, Belgium
- Genres: Jazz, rock, pop, dance, electronics
- Occupations: Singer, musician
- Instruments: Vocals, drums, flugelhorn, vibraphone, bass synthesizer, tubular bells

Isolde Lasoen (born 31 December 1979 in Bruges) is a Belgian (Flemish) drummer and singer.

== Biography ==
At the age of four, Lasoen started with the fanfare orchestra Nut en Vermaak in Maldegem. After secondary school she studied jazz at the Royal Conservatory of Ghent. She is the drummer in bands like Daan, Saint-Marteau, The Happy (new project with among others Reinhard Vanbergen from Das Pop), Isolde et Les Bens (old French and English songs), Briskey and The Whodads. She also works or worked as freelancer with Guido Belcanto, Willy Willy, Flip Kowlier, Raymond van het Groenewoud, Nic Balthazar, Novastar, Jack Van Poll, Lady Linn, Kapotski and others.

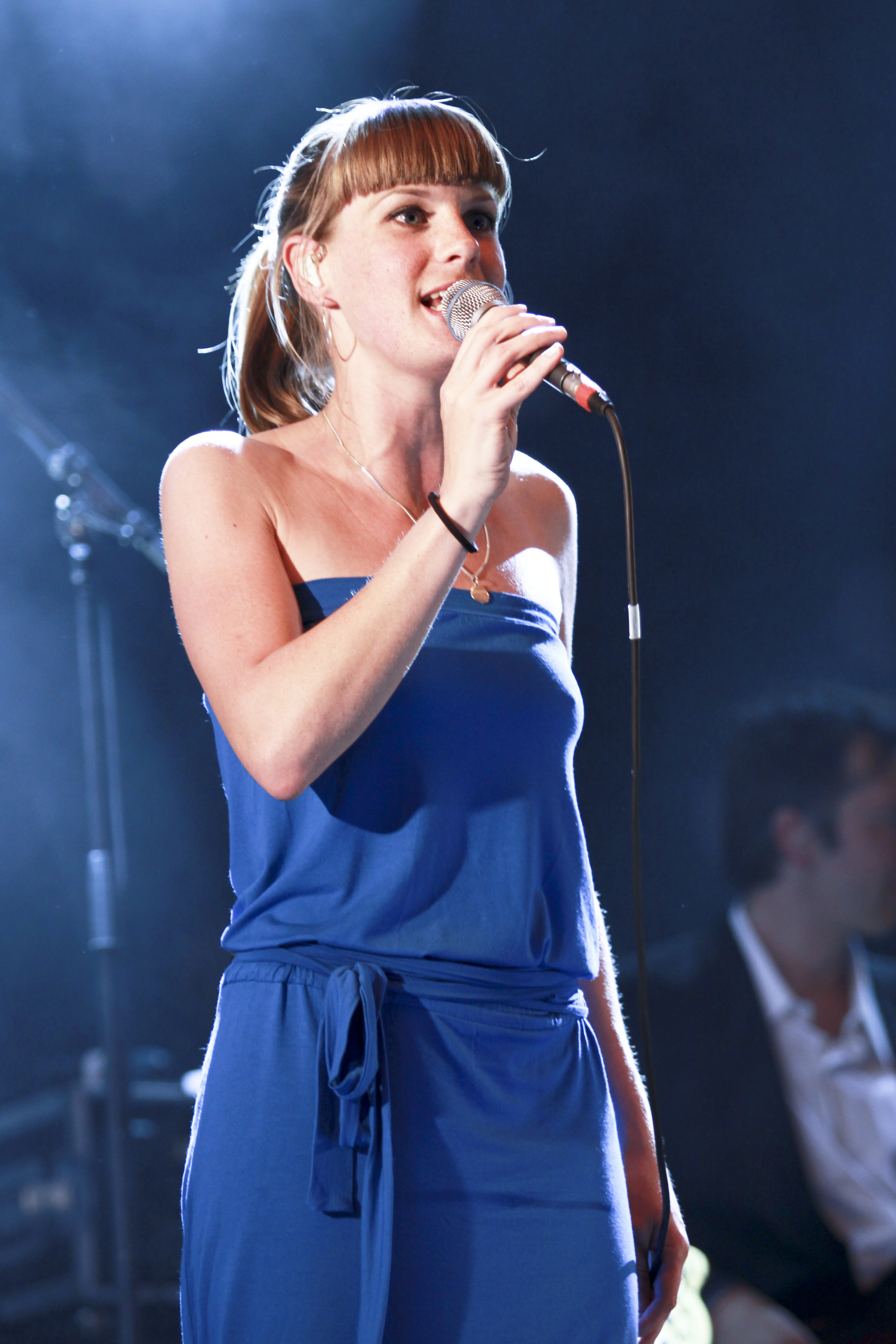
Lasoen performing with Daan at the 2010 Gentse Feesten

In two of Daan's latest albums, Simple and Le Franc Belge, Lasoen outed herself as allround musician: in these records she took care of vocals, drums, vibraphone, trumpet, bass synth and percussion. She also combines these instruments during live acts. Because of this, and mainly because of her singing, Isolde Lasoen appeared more on the forefront, which leads to more solo work. One example is her single "Aluminium Folie", which she recorded with Les Bens, brought out in December 2012.

Lasoen teaches drumming at the Institute for Music and Dance (MUDA), a secondary school for arts in Ghent.

== Discography ==
Year	Single/Album	Peak positions		Notes
Year	Single/Album	BEL (Fl)	BEL (Wa)	Notes
March 8, 2023	Oh Dear LP	–	–	–
2021	"The Four Horsemen"	–	–	–
2011	"Why Don't You Love Me"	17	–	with Willy Willy
2012	"Aluminium folie"	51	–	with Les Bens
2013	"Zetpilcar"	2	–	with Urbanus
2014	"Samba des diables"	81	–	with Les Bens
2014	"Perdu"	57	–	with Les Bens
2015	"Wishful Thinking"	74	–	with Les Bens
2015	"J'ai perdu mon âme"	93	–	with Les Bens and Pieter
2017	"Les belles"	–	–	–
2026	My Kind of Drama	70	–	–
