= Guus =

Guus is a common Dutch given name. It is a diminutive of the name Augustus. The female variant of this name is "Guusje".

People named Guus include:

- Guus Albregts (1900–1980), Dutch economist and politician
- Guus Berkhout (born 1940), Dutch engineer
- Guus Bierings (born 1956), Dutch cyclist and Olympic competitor
- Guus Dräger (1917–1989), Dutch footballer
- Guus Haak (born 1937), Dutch footballer
- Guus van Hecking Colenbrander (1887–1945), Dutch footballer
- Guus Hiddink (born 1946), Dutch football manager and coach
- Guus Hoogmoed (born 1981), Dutch sprinter
- Guus Hupperts (born 1992), Dutch footballer
- Guus Janssen (born 1951), Dutch composer, recording artist and multi-instrumentalist
- Guus Joppen (born 1989), Dutch footballer
- Guus Kessler (1888–1972), Dutch industrialist
- Guus Kouwenhoven (born 1942), Dutch convicted arms trafficker
- Guus Kuijer (born 1942), Dutch author
- Guus Lutjens (1884–1974), Dutch footballer
- Guus Meeuwis (born 1972), Dutch singer-songwriter
- Guus Scheffer (1898–1952), Dutch weightlifter and Olympic competitor
- Guus Til (born 1997), Dutch footballer
- Guus Vogels (born 1975), Dutch field hockey goalkeeper and Olympic medalist
