= Ezoa en niet anders =

Studio album by 't Hof van Commerce
- Released: 2005
- Genre: Hip hop
- Label: Plasticine
- Producer: 't Hof van Commerce

't Hof van Commerce chronology
Rocky 7 (2002)	Ezoa en niet anders (2005)	Stuntman (2012)

Ezoa en Niet Anders is the fourth album by 't Hof van Commerce.

== Track listing ==
1. "Oed Under Grjid"
2. "Niemand Grodder"
3. "Zonder Fans Gin Bands"
4. "Jaloes"
5. "Skit Omoage (En Kopt Drip)"
6. "Lop Mo Deure"
7. "Achter 8 Jaer"
8. "20 Frang Da Aufgeplakt"
9. "Leegaert", with Brahim
10. "Super Commerce Bros.", with Nina Babet, Peter Lesage
11. "In De Rayoeng", with Balo, Gabriel Ríos, Riemeloare, TLP
12. "Ik Wil U Geld"
13. "Borsjt", with Lazy Horse
14. "Gisterenaevend Laete"
15. "Driekartkilo Tekstn", with Spok (5), Statiek
16. "Van De Fakteur"
17. "Oei Gin Vlams Verstaet"

== Chart positions ==
Country	Peak position
Belgium	2
