= Dranouter =

Coordinates: 50°45′57″N 2°47′4″E

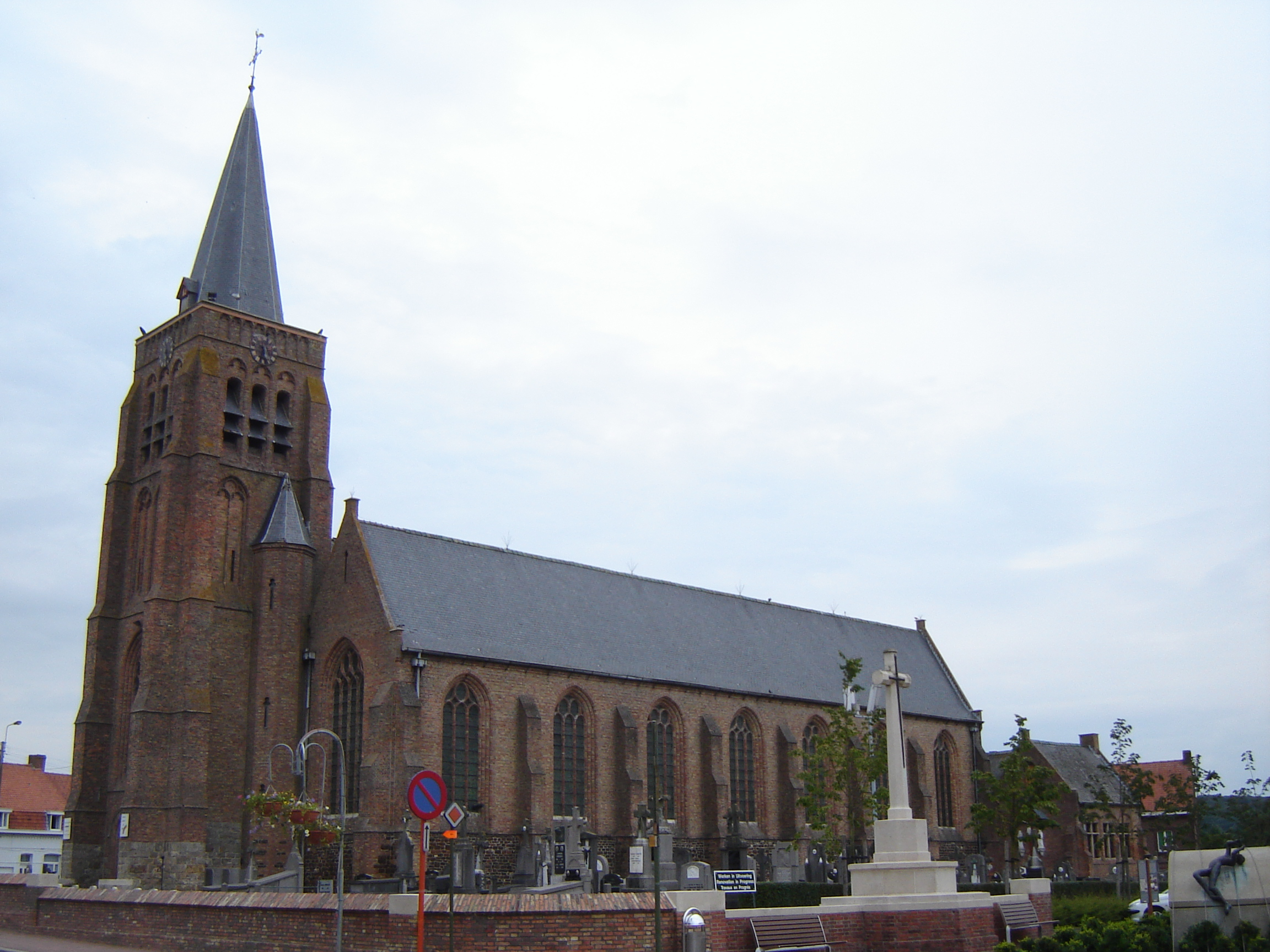
Sint-Jan-de-Doperkerk (Saint John the Baptist)

Dranouter (Dutch, locally known as Nouter) is a village and a deelgemeente in the municipality of Heuvelland in West Flanders, Belgium. Dranouter was an independent municipality before the 1977 local government reforms. Since then, it has been part of the municipality of Heuvelland. The area of the deelgemeente Dranouter is 10.73 km^{2}. The Dranouter Folk Festival is organised in the village every year. The postal code is 8951.

== Population ==
- 1866 census: 1,044
- 1970 census: 805
- 1976: 789
- 2001: 703

== Geography ==
Location of Dranouter within Heuvelland (inset: Belgium)

Dranouter is located at the French border. The nearest towns are Bailleul (to its southwest), Poperinge (to its north), Ypres (to its northeast), and Armentières (to its southeast). The predominant land use is agriculture.
