= Ertebrekers =

Belgian band from West Flanders

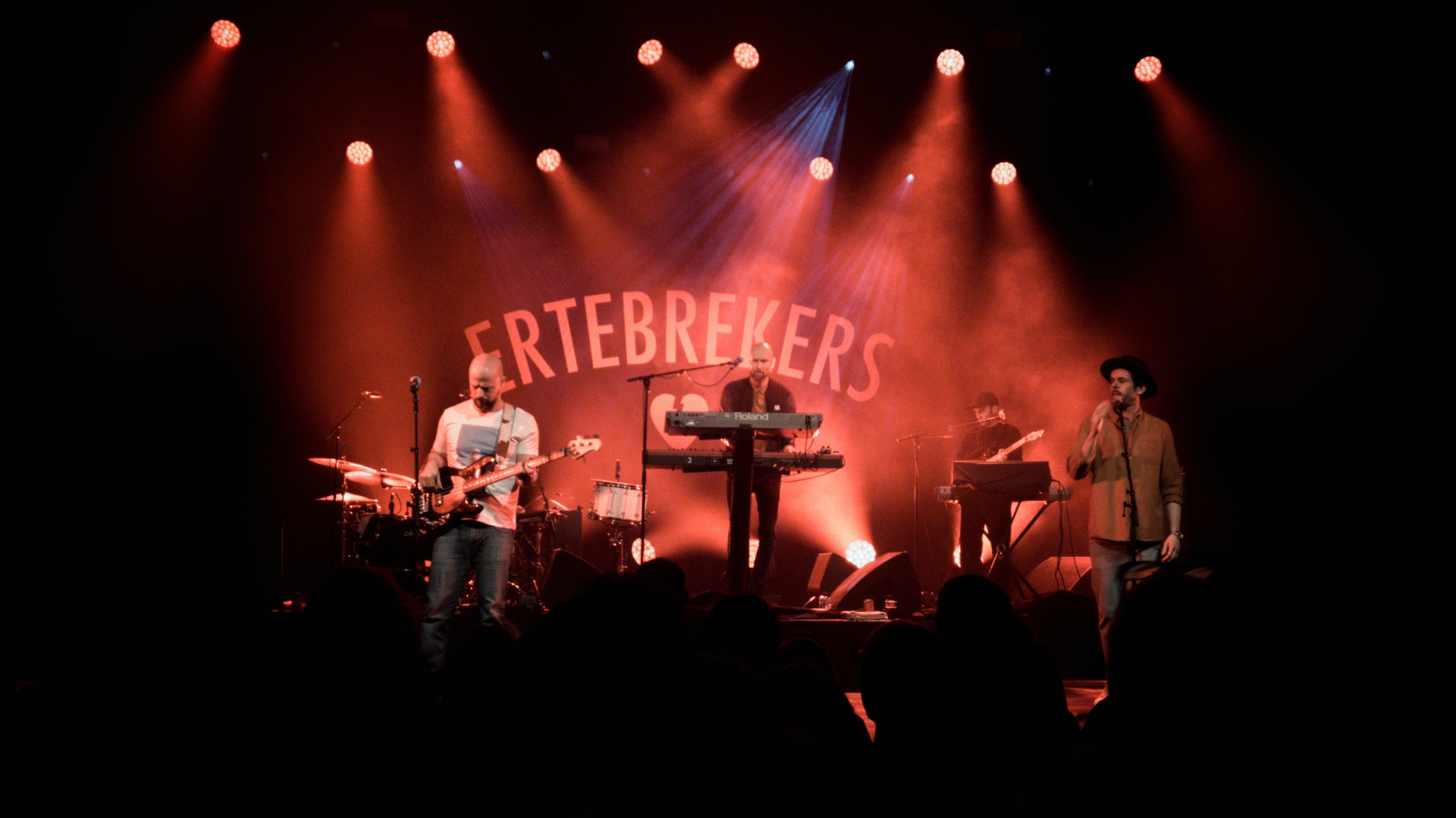

Background information
- Origin: Belgium
- Genres: Hip hop, groove, blue-eyed soul
- Years active: 2016–present
- Label: Sony
- Members: Flip Kowlier; Peter Lesage; Jeffrey Bearelle; Karel De Backer; Kasper Cornelus

Ertebrekers is a Belgian band from the province West Flanders in Flanders, the Dutch-speaking part of Belgium. The band name means 'heart breakers' in their local dialect. Their lyrics are in West Flemish, the Dutch dialect of the province of West Flanders, and their style has been described as a mixture of hip hop, groove and white soul. The band is composed of Flip Kowlier, Peter Lesage and Jeffrey Bearelle.

In their debut year, in March 2016, they already topped the Flemish Top 10, which is presented weekly by the local radio channel Radio 2.

== Discography ==
=== Albums ===
Album(s) with hits in the Flemish Ultratop 50	Date of appearance	Date of entrance	Highest position	Number of weeks	Remarks
Otel	2016	02-04-2016	9	5	
Crème	2019	16-03-2019	4		

=== Singles ===
Single(s) with hits in the Flemish Ultratop 50	Date of appearance	Date of entrance	Highest position	Number of weeks	Remarks
"De zji"	2016	27-02-2016	26	10	with Maaike Cafmeyer
"Eva Mendes"	2016	15-10-2016	45		
"Shimokitazawa"	2019	25-05-2019	tip23		
"Diepe Waters"	2019	07-12-2019	tip25		
