= Rocky 7 (album) =

Studio album by 't Hof van Commerce
- Released: 2002
- Genre: Hip Hop
- Label: Kinky Star
- Producer: 't Hof van Commerce

't Hof van Commerce chronology
| Herman (1999) | Rocky 7 (2002) | Ezoa en niet anders (2005) |

Rocky 7 is the 2002 third album by Belgian hip-hop group 't Hof van Commerce.

== Track listing ==
1. "Slaet op min gat"
2. "Kom mor ip"
3. "'t Beste moe nog komm"
4. "4T4 zegt"
5. "Punk of yo!"
6. "Allo concurrentie" (with Statiek)
7. "Punk of yo"
8. "Dikkenekke"
9. "Buyse zegt"
10. "Tusn eemle en elle" (with Stijn Nijs)
11. "Wik ist?" (with Freestyle Fabrik)
12. "Zonder Totetrekkerie" (with TLP)
13. "Leverancier zegt"
14. "Zeg et voart"
15. "Lat mie zin en grust" (with Peter Lesage)
16. "Casino Royale" (with Massis and Mauro Pawlowski)

== Chart positions ==
| Country | Peak position |
|---|---|
| Belgium | 7 |
