= Starflam =

Belgian hip hop group

Starflam is a Belgian hip hop group from Liège in the French-speaking southern part of Belgium - Wallonia. The group started out in the early 1990s under the name H-Posse with members DJ Mig One, Fred'alabas, Seg and Balo (AKA Baloji). A few years later, after Brussels-born Akro and Mista R. joined the group, the name was changed to Malfrats Linguistiques (linguistic gangsters). Mista R. later left the group when he emigrated to France, and was replaced by Kaer and Pavé, two rappers from Liège. The group changed names again, now to Starflam (the reverse anagram of Malfrats). They now consist of 5 rappers, a bass player and a DJ. In 2005, Balo left the group to start a solo career.

10 years after their last album together, the group made a comeback in 2015 with 2 new single : "Plus que jamais" (January 2015) and "A l'ancienne" (April 2015).

== Discography ==
- Corde Raide (12", Discipline Records, 1997)
- Starflam (Discipline Records / Rough Trade, 1998)
- Bled Runner (12", Warner, 2000)
- Live & Direct (Warner, 2000)
- Survivant (EMI, 2001)
- Donne Moi de l'Amour (EMI, 2003)
- Donne Moi de l'Amour : Deluxe edition (EMI, 2004)
- Faites du bruit by EMI 2005)
- L'encre, La Sueur Et le Sang (Akro Solo) 2006
- Au Crunk (Akro Solo) 2007
- Bleu électrique (Akro Solo) 2011

== DVD ==
- Faites du Bruit (EMI, 2005)
