= Amorroma =

Belgian folk music band

Amorroma is a Belgian acoustic folk music duo of the present with roots in traditional European folk-dance music. The group was founded by Jowan Merckx in 2000, and consists of himself (composer, recorder, singer, bagpipes) and Sarah Ridy (harp).

Amorroma gives concerts as a duo but can also give concerts as a trio, quartet, quintet and sextet. The other members of the group are Vincent Noiret double bass, Maarten Decombel guitar, Elly Aerden singer and Toon van Mierlo bagpipes, accordion, saxophone. All musicians hold qualifications from the academy of music. Jowan Merckx obtained his recorder degree at the Lemmensinstituut in 1996 and Sarah Ridy obtained her harp degree at the College of Music in 2003 and her Baroque harp performance degree at the Koninklijk Conservatorium Den Haag in 2006 and her master's degree in 2009.

Prior to Amorroma, they were members of a group with Gwenaël Micault, Rheidun Schlesinger and Bert van Reeth. Bert van Reeth has arranged many pieces for Amorroma.

All melodies are composed by Jowan Merckx. In the music is the recorder used as a main musical instrument, with makes the music of Amorroma unique. Amorroma has a programme of dance music with a singer too. This programme is based on poems, written by Jowan Merckx and traditional French lyrics, with music composed by Jowan Merckx.

The name Amorroma consists of the two words Amor and Roma. For the Cathars these words have a contradiction. Amorroma uses this theme for her music to show all different feelings with form part of human being. The music is suitable for dancing and to listen to. Amorroma gives concerts at festivals, schools and folk-dance balls.

== Les Tisserands ==
Amorroma takes part in the musical program Les Tisserands with vocal-music group Zefiro Torna and jazz duo Traces. The program is related to the religion grouping Cathars of the Middle Ages. The name Les Tisserands means weavers, the occupation that they often were practising. This musical program is from the present with influences of the Middle Ages, the Renaissance, the baroque, jazz and folk. In the music are medieval lyrics used with some original melodies and some melodies are composed by Els van Laethem. All instrumental melodies are composed by Jowan Merckx.

== musicians AmorRoma ==
- Jowan Merckx: recorders, whistles, high bagpipes of Central France, gaïta, flugelhorn, percussion, vocals
- Sarah Ridy: triple harp
- Vincent Noiret: double bass
- Elly Aerden: vocals
- Maarten Decombel: mandola, guitar, vocals
- Toon van Mierlo: uilleann pipes, low bagpipes of Central France, clarinet
- Tristan Driessens: old Turkisch oud

== musicians Les Tisserands ==
AmorRoma with Bert van Reeth

Zefiro Torna

- Els van Laethem: singer
- Jurgen de Bruyn: lute
- Liam Fennelly: viola da gamba, fiddle

Traces

- Philippe Laloy: soprano saxophone
- Vincent Noiret: contrabass
- Rheidun Schlesinger harp

== Discography ==
- Merci, Jules (2014)
- Chants d'amour et de mort en Wallonie (2013)
- Carrousel (2011)
- La-bas dans ces Vallons (2010)
- Les Tisserands (2006)
- Balance (2005)
- Carduelis (2003)
- Op Voyage (2000)

== Reviews ==
- Op Voyage (Folk World)
- Les Tisserands (Psychedelic Folk)
