= Live & Direct (Starflam album) =

Studio album by Starflam
- Released: 2000
- Genre: Hip-hop
- Length: 33:29
- Label: Warner Music

Starflam chronology
Starflam (1998)	Live & Direct (2000)	Survivant (2001)

Live & Direct is the second album of the Belgium Rap group Starflam.

== Track listing ==
1. "33 RPM – 4:05
2. "Monde confus – 3:05
3. "Ce plat pays – 4:42
4. "Choisis ton camp – 1:45
5. "El Diablo – 4:19
6. "Bled Runner – 4:41
7. "Mic smokin' – 5:15
8. "Dead man – 5:35
