= Mindgames (band) =

Belgian progressive rock band

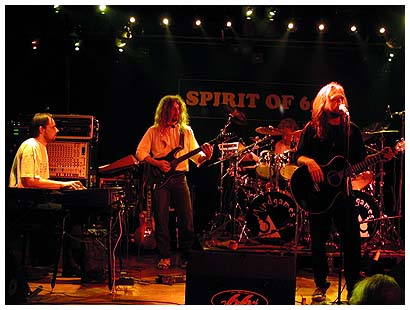
Mindgames in 2003

Mindgames is a progressive rock band from Belgium. The band was founded in 1997 by Eric Vandormael (bass) and Bart Schram (vocals). After placing a few ads in music magazines they recruited Benny Petak (drums, percussion) and Tom Truyers (piano, keyboards). In 1999 as a four-piece they recorded a demo, featuring the songs Mental Argue, Signs From The Sky, and Dreamin' The Circus.

In 2000 Rudy Van Der Veken (guitars) joined, so completing the line-up of the band. The end of 2002 saw the release of their debut CD International Daylight, an album that shows the strong influences on the band of Yes, Jethro Tull, Genesis and Frank Zappa. Later on International Daylight came to be distributed by the French label Musea Records. Thanks to this, the band received wider exposure and garnered favourable reviews internationally.

Mindgames subsequently built up a strong live reputation, taking time off in 2005 to compose new songs. At the beginning of 2006 the band released their second album Actors In A Play, produced by Frank Van Bogaert. The concept album is a six-act story, focusing on each of the 'actors' in turn before finally coming to the inevitable conclusion that the world is itself just one giant play. The CD sold especially well in Germany.

Irreconcilable musical differences, which became apparent during writing and recording Actors In A Play, resulted in the departure of co-founder Eric Vandormael. His replacement Maximilian von Wüllerstorff made his debut on bass for the band's third album MMX, released on New Year's Day, 2010.

== Discography ==
- Demo (1999)
- International Daylight (2002)
- Actors in a play (2006)
- MMX (2010)
- Paradox of Choice (2015)
- Spirals in the Wider Space (2024)

== Band members ==
- Bart Schram - Vocals, acoustic guitar
- Tom Truyers - keyboard, piano
- Sandro Starita - guitar
- Maximilian von Wüllerstorff - bass
- Benny Petak - drums, percussion

- Rudy Van Der Veken - guitar (2000-2011)
- Eric Vandormael - bass (1997–2006)

== Websites ==
- Official site of Mindgames
