= Guusje =

Guusje is a given name. The male variant of this name is "Guus". Notable people with the given name include:

- Guusje ter Horst (born 1952), Dutch politician and psychologist
- Guusje Nederhorst (1969–2004), Dutch actress and singer
- Guusje Steenhuis (born 1992), Dutch judoka
- Guusje van Mourik (born 1955), Dutch karateka, judoka, and boxer
