= Daan (band) =

Band from Belgium

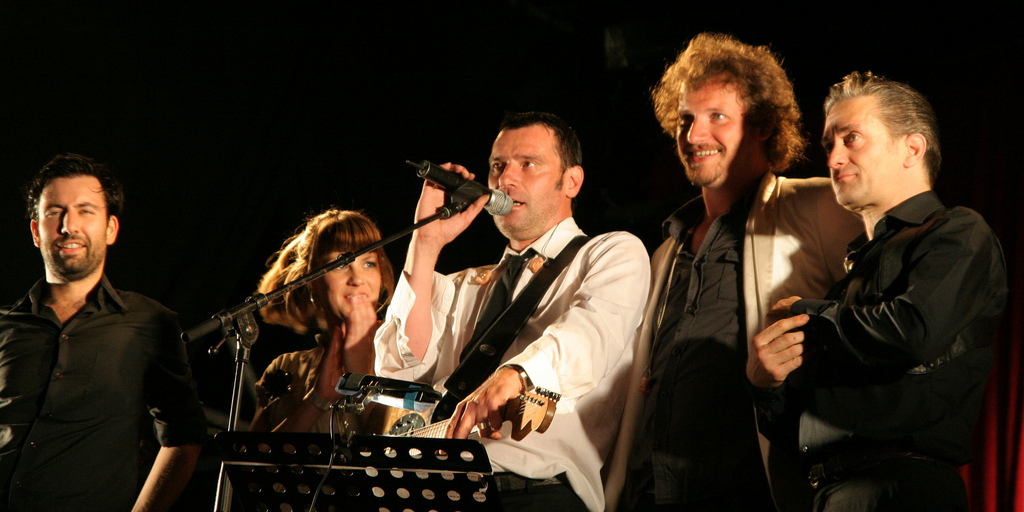
- (from left to right) Jorg Strecker, Isolde Lasoen, Daan Stuyven, Jeroen Swinnen and Steven Janssens

Background information
- Origin: Belgium
- Genres: Rock, Dance, Electronics, Film music
- Years active: End 1980s until present
- Labels: Heavenhotel, [PIAS] Recordings
- Members: Daan Stuyven; Geoffry Burton; Otti Van Der Werf; Isolde Lasoen; Jeroen Swinnen; Jo Hermans
- Past members: Gregory Frateur; Steven Janssens; Jorg Strecker; Jean-François Assy (in 2010)
- Website: daan.be

Daan is a solo project from the singer-songwriter and multi-instrumentalist Daniël "Daan" Stuyven. When the band acts live, it is composed of:

- Daan Stuyven (guitar)
- Geoffry Burton (guitar)
- Otti Van Der Werf (bass guitar)
- Isolde Lasoen (drums)
- Jeroen Swinnen (synthesizer)
- Jo Hermans (trumpet)

== History ==
=== Profools ===
Daan was already active for years when in 1999 the first CD Profools came out. It is a hard copy of songs from Stuyven that he recorded between 1993 and 1999. The influence of Dead Man Ray, Stuyven's previous project, can clearly still be felt, even though there are some electronic plays in the track list.

=== Bridge Burner ===
The second CD, Bridge Burner (2002), was a breakthrough, partly because Stuyven chose to go more into the direction of electronically flavoured dance music. The dance number "Swedish Designer Drugs" became a club classic and the frontman gradually gathered a live band around himself, consisting of top musicians like Isolde Lasoen (drums, vibraphone and backing vocalist), opera singer Gregory Frateur, Jeroen Swinnen (synthesizer and backing vocalist), Steven Janssens (guitar), Otti Van Der Werf (bass guitar), and Jo Hermans (trumpet and backing vocalist).

=== Victory ===
In 2004 Victory came out. Daan continued with Bridge Burner but pushed its artistic limits by experimenting with rock and dance. This CD turned out to be a smash hit: Stuyven obtained gold and won the ZAMU Award for best album of 2004. The title song "Victory" and the instrumental dance track "Housewife" reached gold status and enhanced his live reputation. He appeared at many festivals, including Rock Werchter 2004 where he ascended the main stage one year later.

=== Film music ===
Released in the second half of 2005, Cinema was a compilation CD with film music that Stuyven made for the cinema and TV films Verboden te zuchten, Meisje, Un honnête commerçant and Suspect.

Camera, his first DVD, appeared in the spring of 2006 and contained the AB concert of December 2005, an RTBF documentary and a couple of video clips.

=== The Player ===
In November 2006 the fourth album came out, titled The Player (PIAS), that obtained gold within a year. The single with the same name became a hit in the Ultratop 50 purely based on the number of paid downloads. In the second single "Promis Q" Stuyven further investigated the limits of artistic accuracy and created a bridge between the genres dance and German schlager.

=== ZAMU ===
At the ZAMU Awards of February 2007 Daan Stuyven was the only artist to achieve five nominations and two prizes. His "The Player" is rewarded as best video clip (DOP Carl Rottiers); the public selected the number as the best song of 2006.

Stuyven unexpectedly brought the evergreen song "De lichtjes van de Schelde" together with the composer Bobbejaan Schoepen, who was awarded a Lifetime Achievement ZAMU Award. In March 2007 Stuyven dragged the song in the final of the VRT-programme Zo is er maar één, in which the most beautiful song in Dutch is searched. It also became the usual encore during a tour in 2007, his largest musical tour until then.

In the summer of 2008 an extra tour through Belgium followed, shortly afterwards followed by a number of concerts in which Stuyven made proper and contemporary arrangements from forgotten work from the period of Volt, Dead Man Ray, Supermarx and Running Cow.

=== Manhay ===
On 25 April 2009 the fifth album, Manhay was released. Synthesizers have a less prominent role then in the earlier work of Stuyven. Guitar, piano and singing take the lead. At the occasion of this new disk also a club tour through Flanders had place. In that year, the album stood interruptedly in HUMO's top 20 of Belgian albums since it came out.

=== Music Industry Awards ===
On 8 January 2010 Stuyven and the group Absynthe Minded received four prizes each at the 2009 MIA's. Stuyven won the MIA for best male solo artist and was also awarded prizes for best author/composer, best video clip with Exes and best graphical design with Manhay. At the MIA's 2010 Stuyven was again among the winners. On 7 January 2011 he obtained the MIA for best male solo artist, just like the year before.

=== Simple ===
This album came out on 26 November 2010. It mainly contains restyled versions of older titles of Daan, apart from two new numbers ("Protocol" and "I'm What You Need"). All numbers are executed by Daan (zang, piano, gitaar), Isolde Lasoen (drums, song) and cellist Jean-François Assy (cello, backing vocals). The album was accompanied by a tour, albeit without the entire live band, but just with Stuyven, Lasoen and Assy.

=== Concert and Le Franc Belge ===
In 2011 the album Concert came out. In April 2013 the album Le Franc Belge followed.

=== 2010 onwards ===
In December 2011 Daan gave a roof concert for the last edition of the Belgian charity action Music for life.

In August 2013 an incident occurred as Stuyven stood drunk on stage at the festival Linkerwoofer. After half an hour the band members left and the concert was entirely shut down. In October 2013 the single "La Crise", a song reflecting the misery of the contemporary European economic crisis containing Greek music (Greece was among the most vulnerable countries), became infamous in Greece as some local media perceived it as an insult against the country. To clarify that he did not criticize Greece but only ironically chants about the European crisis in general, he also added Greek subtitles in the YouTube-video.

== Discography ==
=== Albums ===
Album(s) with hits in the Flemish Ultratop 200	Date of appearance	Date of entrance	Highest position	Number of weeks	Remarks
Bridge Burner	21 June 2002	24 August 2002	45	11	
Victory	26 April 2004	1 May 2004	2	85	
Cinema	11 November 2005	19 November 2005	28	12	
The Player	6 November 2006	11 November 2006	2	40	Gold
Manhay	24 April 2009	2 May 2009	2	59	Gold
Simple	22 November 2010	4 December 2010	2	47	Platinum
Concert	14 November 2011	26 November 2011	31	27	
Le Franc Belge	18 April 2013	27 April 2013	1 (3 wks)	66	Gold
Nada	18 November 2016	26 November 2016	9	29	
The Ride	19 November 2022	19 November 2022	13		

=== Singles ===
Single(s) with hits in the Flemish Ultratop 50	Date of appearance	Date of entrance	Highest position	Number of weeks	Remarks
Swedish designer drugs	2002	21 September 2002	tip6	-	
Love	2003	15 February 2003	tip13	-	
Victory	2004	13 March 2004	tip7	-	
Housewife	2004	5 June 2004	tip4	-	
Addicted	2004	18 December 2004	40	4	
Type ex ex type	2005	9 July 2005	tip2	-	
J'ai fait un rêve / I had a dream	2005	9 July 2005	32	13	with Axelle Red / Nr. 20 in the Radio 2 Top 30
The player	2006	25 November 2006	11	15	
Promis Q	2007	27 January 2007	tip4	-	
Exes	23 March 2009	25 April 2009	17	15	Nr. 17 in the Radio 2 Top 30
Crawling from the wreck	20 July 2009	15 August 2009	tip6	-	
Icon	19 October 2009	14 November 2009	2	31	Nr. 2 in the Radio 2 Top 30 / Gold
Wifebeater	22 November 2010	4 December 2010	tip4	-	Nr. 12 in the Radio 2 Top 30
I'm what you need	23 May 2011	11 June 2011	tip32	-	
Victory (Live at Flagey 2011)	2011	26 November 2011	tip71	-	
La chatte	2013	23 March 2013	tip11	-	with Buscemi
Everglades	2013	13 April 2013	26	8	Nr. 28 in the Radio 2 Top 30
La crise	2013	19 October 2013	31	5*	
Parfaits mensonges	2013	6 December 2013	tip67*	-	
