= Perry Rose =

Belgian-Irish singer (born 1962)

Perry Rose is a Belgian-Irish singer, born in Brussels on 9 May 1962, and who has been active in Belgium, France, Switzerland and Ireland since the release of Because of You in 1991. Rose, who comes from circus families on both his mother and father's side, has since recorded eight albums and toured extensively.

At the end of 2001 Perry recorded Hocus Pocus in Belgium, Brittany and Ireland with Irish producers Graham Murphy and Chris O'Brien from The Production Suite in Dublin (whose credits include Dove, Clannad, Donna Lewis, The Human League, Trevor Horn, Aslan, Perry Blake, Máire Brennan, Picturehouse, Ronan Hardiman and Lord of the Dance). It came out mid April 2002 in France, Switzerland and Belgium, on France's L'Oz Production label.

Guests on the album include French pianist Didier Squiban and Uileann piper Ronan le Bars (known for his work with l’Héritage des Celtes and Dan Ar Braz). It was followed by the live album Happy live recorded at the venerable Brussels venue l’Ancienne Belgique.

Rose has also recorded "Fly" for Didier Laloy / S-TRES, "Stop the pain" for Amnesty International, several traditional Irish tunes in the company of Trio Trad for their compilation Le Monde est un village and a reworked version of "Glasgow" for the CD Eveil aux langues (2005).

== Discography ==
- 1991: Because of You E.P. – Team For Action
- 1992: All Seasons
- 1996: The Bright Ring of the Day – Team for Action
- 1996: Green Bus
- 1998: The Triumphant March
- 1999: Celtic Circus
- 2002: Hocus Pocus
- 2004: Happy Live (recorded live at the Ancienne Belgique in Brussels)- Team for Action
- 2012: Wonderful – Team for Action
