= Sons (band) =

Oklahoma rock band

- Also known as: Sons of God
- Origin: Oklahoma City, Oklahoma
- Genres: Christian rock, indie rock, post-rock
- Years active: 2007–2008; 2009–2013
- Labels: Slospeak, Come&Live!
- Past members: Aaron Newberry; Ethan Kattau; David Gedders; Chris Erickson; Michael Lopez

Sons, (stylized SONS), formerly Sons of God, were a Christian music band from Oklahoma. They started making music in 2007 and disbanded in 2008, only to reform in 2009, and disbanded again in 2013. Their members were Aaron Newberry, Ethan Kattau, David Gedders and Chris Erickson when they finally disbanded, with former members being Jordan McGee, Alex Rust, Kyle Laster, and Michael Lopez.

== Music history ==
The band started in 2007, with their first release, The Genesis Prologue, an extended play, while they were called Sons of God, released by Come&Live! Records, on January 12, 2010. Their first studio album, Keep Quiet, was released on February 14, 2012, with Slospeak Records. This album had two singles released, where they charted on the Billboard magazine Christian Rock chart, while "Doubt" peaked at No. 7, the single, "Masters of Flattery", peaked at No. 21. Their last release, an extended play, Keep Quieter, released on December 11, 2012, by Slospeak Records.

== Members ==
Last known line-up

- Aaron Newberry – lead vocals, guitar
- Ethan Kattau – lead guitar
- David Geders – bass
- Chris Erickson – drums

Former members

- Michael Lopez – drums
- Jordan McGee - drums
- Kyle Laster - guitar
- Alex Rust - guitar

== Discography ==
Studio albums

- Keep Quiet (February 14, 2012, Slospeak)

EPs

- The Genesis Prologue (January 8, 2010, Come&Live!, as Sons of God)
- Keep Quieter (December 11, 2012, Slospeak)

Singles

Year	Single	Chart Positions
Year	Single	US Chr Rock
2012	"Doubt"	7
2013	"Masters of Flattery"	21
