= Trio Dhoore =

Flemish folk band

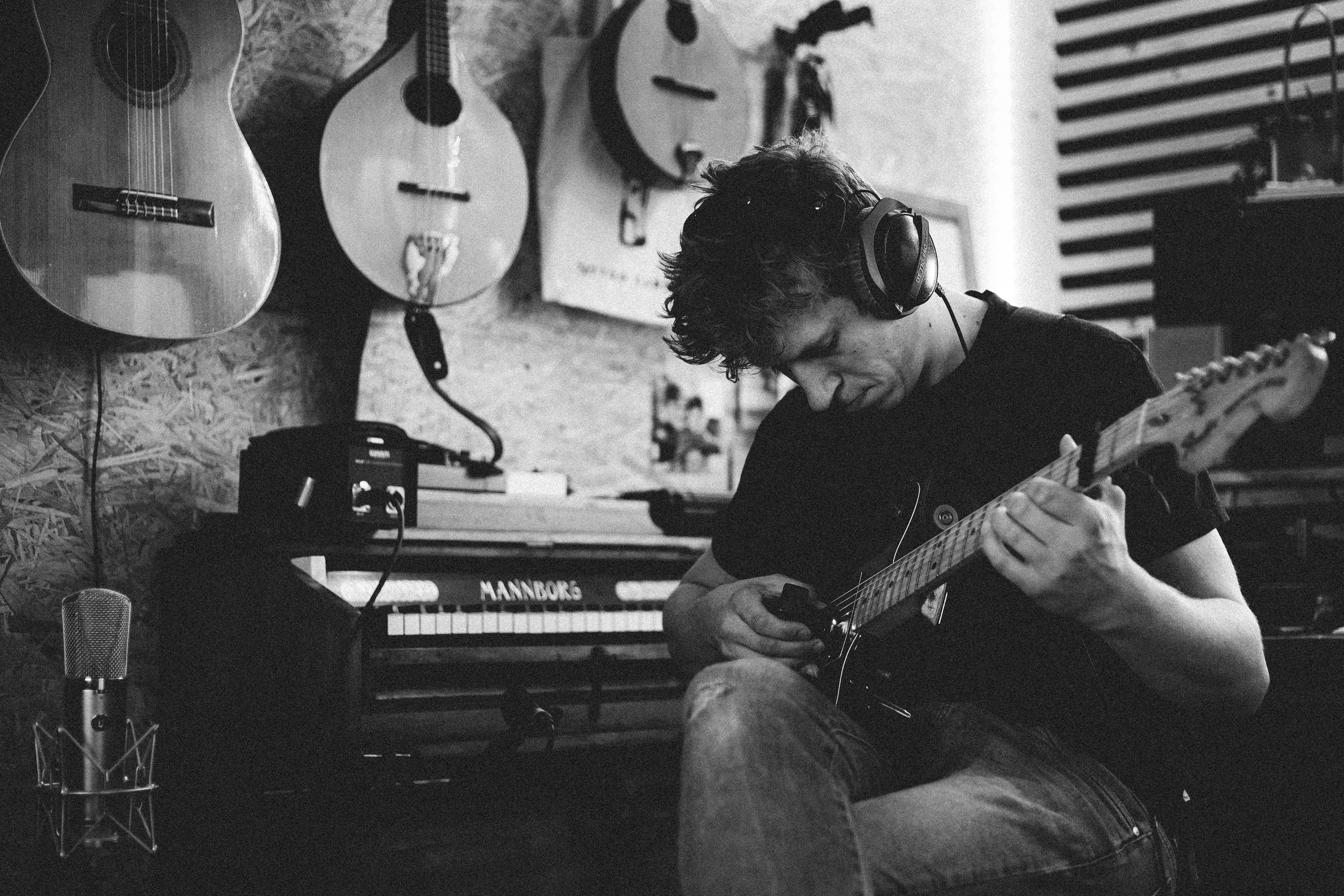
- Ward Dhoore

Background information
- Origin: Flanders, Belgium
- Genres: Belgian folk music
- Years active: 2010–2021
- Labels: Trad Records Belgium
- Members: Ward Dhoore; Hartwin Dhoore; Koen Dhoore
- Website: www.triodhoore.com

Trio Dhoore was a Belgian Flemish instrumental folk band composed of brothers Ward, Hartwin, and Koen Dhoore. It was active from 2010 to 2021.

== History ==
The brothers grew up playing music together, starting around age 10. They formed the trio in 2010. The trio dissolved in September 2021, with Ward and Hartwin continuing on as Siger.

== Musical style ==
Chris Nickson of RootsWorld writes that the band has "grown into a central part of the European instrumental movement, influenced but not completely consumed by their native traditions". Peter Thelen of Exposé writes that "their music is a beautifully crafted collection of strongly melodic pieces that are at once warm, tempered and powerful, with every player an essential element of their sound". Irish Music Magazine writes that "if you are new to Flemish music Trio Dhoore is at its cutting edge and well worth discovering". Alex Gallacher of Folk Radio UK writes that "the intuitive musicianship between the brothers is quite magical", and that they create "beautiful soundscapes" which "breathe new life into traditional Flemish music".

== Band members ==
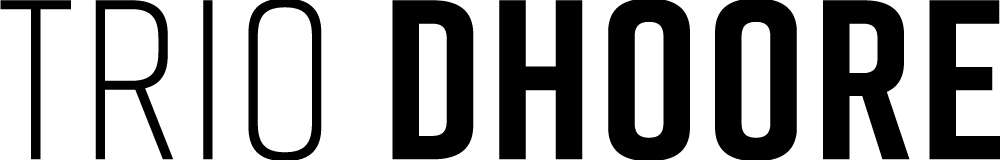
Logo

- Koen Dhoore – Hurdy-gurdy
- Hartwin Dhoore – Diatonic accordion
- Ward Dhoore – Guitar

== Discography ==
- Modus Operandi (2013)
- Parachute (2015)
- Momentum (2016)
- August (2019)
