= 't Hof van Commerce =

Hip hop group from Belgium

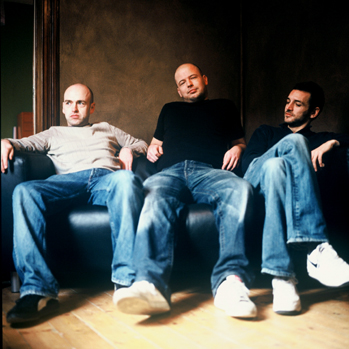
The Belgian hip hop crew 't Hof van Commerce.

't Hof van Commerce is a Belgian hip hop crew from Izegem in the province West Flanders in Flanders, the Dutch-speaking part of Belgium. Their name means 'commercial court' in their local dialect. Almost all their raps/lyrics are in West Flemish, the Dutch dialect of the province of West Flanders, with the exception of some lines sung in Limburgish by DJ 4T4 or a mix between those two dialects.

Band members are Filip Cauwelier, Serge Buyse and Kristof Michiels. Ex-members include Johnny de Pony (a.k.a. Georges De Keesmaecker) and Floerke den Aap (a.k.a. Wilhelm De Tura).

== History ==
It started with the crossover band The Prophets of Finance which stopped around 1993–1994. In 1997, 't Hof van Commerce was founded, and in 1998, they release their first album En in Izzegem, referring to the little city Izegem where the band was founded. About 8000 albums were sold. That was quite a high number for a debut because the entire CD was sung in West Flemish, only understood by about one million people. The next year, they already had a second CD with the title Herman. That album was sold 5000 times.

In 2000 Flip Kowlier started a successful solo career as a singer-songwriter, while staying a member of 't Hof van Commerce. Two years later, in 2002, they got their third album, titled Rocky 7. That album was their biggest success this far, with 10 000 sells. So in 2003, 't Hof (how they call themselves) was asked a lot in festivals in Belgium and the Netherlands.

In 2005, 't Hof released another album with the title Ezoa en niet anders (This way and not differently). For the first time under their own record label Plasticine. For that record, a lot of guest rappers were invited such as TLP and Gabriel Rios.

In 2011, Flip Kowlier temporarily stopped his (still successful) solo career, to continue with 't Hof van Commerce after a long silence. This resulted in a new album in 2012 with the title Stuntman.

't Hof van Commerce has been on hiatus between October 2013 and January 2018.

== Discography ==
=== Albums ===
- "En in Izzegem" (Kinky Star, 1998)
- "Herman" (Kinky Star, 1999)
- "Rocky 7" (Kinky Star, 2002)
- "Ezoa en niet anders" (Petrol/EMI, 2005)
- "Stuntman" (Petrol, 2012)
- "LP6" (Petrol, 2025)

=== Singles ===
- Zonder niet (translation: without nothing) 1998
- Dommestik en levrancier (1998)
- Spek'n'Bwon'n (1998)
- Kom mor ip (translation: bring it on) (2002)
- Zonder totetrekkerie (translation: without insincerity) (2003)
- Punk of yo! (2003)
- Niemand grodder (translation: nobody bigger) (2005)
- Jaloes (translation: jealous) (2005)
- Wupperbol (translation: bouncing ball) (2011)
- "Ti Nie Wo Wi!" (translation: It isn't true) (2024)
