= DJ Elephant Power =

Belgian turntablist and producer

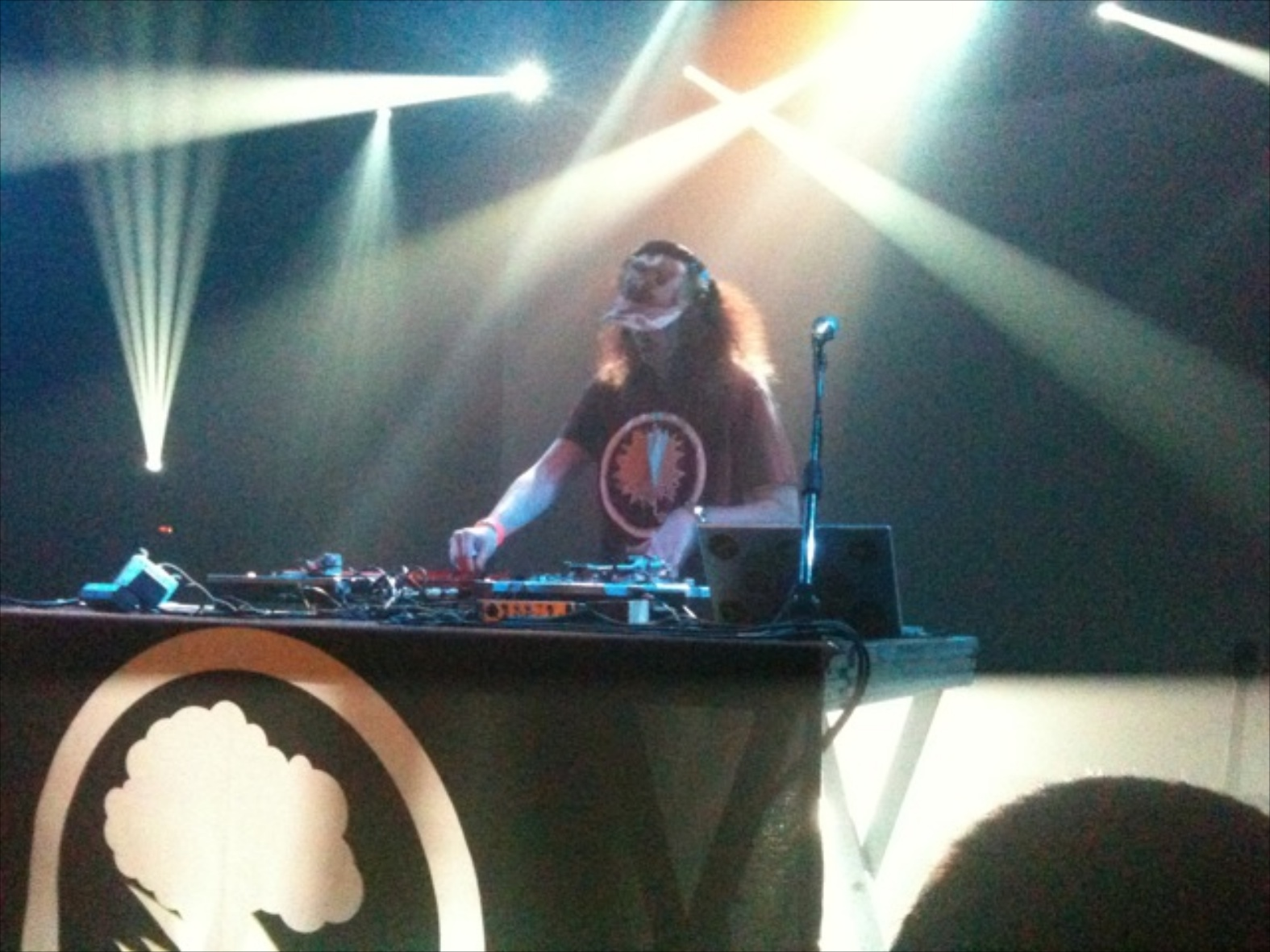
- DJ Elephant Power performing at Le Botanique, Brussels, November 2010

Background information
- Born: Nicolas Baudoux
- Origin: Belgium
- Genres: Bass, Breakbeat, Hip Hop, House, Turntablist, Skratchstep
- Occupations: DJ, producer
- Instruments: Turntables, drum, synthesizer, programming
- Years active: 2004–present
- Labels: Sonig, Elephant Power Records
- Website: djelephantpower.com

Nicolas Baudoux known by his stage name DJ Elephant Power, is a Belgian turntablist and producer. With the Cologne label Sonig (from Mouse On Mars), he has released various albums. He created his own label Elephant Power Records in 2013.

== Biography ==
DJ Elephant Power (Nicolas Baudoux) is electronic music producer, composer, turntablist, sound designer and DJ based in Brussels who has made a significant impact with his unique sound and style. He debuted as the duo ‘Scratch Pet Land’ with his brother Laurent (aka Lawrence Le Doux) and released the album “Solo Soli iiii” in 2001. He also had continued hosting improvisation radio show ‘Electrosold’ which is progressed to ‘Electrosold Collectif’ from 1995 to 2004. At the same time, he had coproduced a project group ‘Fan Club Orchestra’ as DJ Crol from 1999 to 2004 and released three vinyls as well. Since his first solo album “No Si, Ni So” released in 2004, he has been always exploring new sounds and beats with ingenious approach and passion for creation. The second album "Scratch the Hulu" released in 2007 achieved critical success. His creative range is represented by mesmerising sounds and infectious beats in blended genres with superb production skills, which already verified by prestigious music award ‘Les Octaves de la Musique’ with his 3rd album “Elepha In Da Flash” in 2011. He has released 5 albums, 7 EPs, 3 singles on labels including Cologne based Sonig and his own record label Elephant Power Records established in 2013. As a DJ, his live sets have been renowned for distinctive sound, powerful beats and high energy with his exceptional scratching skills. He has created a unique musical signature within various genres that resonates with audiences. He participated in extended tours with several artists including Mouse On Mars and Ratatat. Elephant Power has played at clubs and festivals worldwide such as Berghain (DE), le Bataclan (FR), Dour Festival (BE), Melkweg (NL), Hole Seoul (South Korea) and many more.

His 6th album “Blowing From Above” was released in 2024.

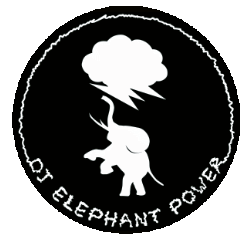

== Discography ==
Studio albums

- "No Si, Ni So" (2004)
- "Scratch The Hulu" (2007)
- "Atlas Anthem" (2008)
- "Elepha In Da Flash (2010)"
- "Night" (2019)
- "Blowing From Above lp" (2024)

EPs

- "Gold Skratch" (2013)
- "Skratchstep Fire" (2014)
- "Sylver Skratch" (2014)
- "Future Thunder" (2015)
- "Rebel Snare / Hyper Kick" (2016)
- "Rising Cloud / Tropic Clap" (2016)
- "Soda Waves ep" (2017)
- "Blowing From Above ep" (2024)

Singles

- "Enter (Paradise) single" (2020)
- "Slowdown single" (2021)
- "Oasis" (2021)

== Guest appearances ==
- "Tromatic Reflexxions" by Von Südenfed (2007)
- "Bronze by Gold " Choreographer Stephanie Thiersch (2015)
- "Chombotrope" Choreographer Stephanie Thiersch (2017)

== Soundtrack ==
- "Fini de Rire" director Olivier Malvoisin (2015)
- "Hello to Emptiness" Choreographer Stéphanie Thiersch (2022)
- "Land Im Land" Choreographer Stéphanie Thiersch (2023)

== Award ==
- Belgian "Octaves" awards 2011 (category Electro)
- Cologne Dance award 2017 with the Chombotrope project

== Interviews ==
- For the Goethe-Institut, conducted by Mario Vondegracht
- For the Larsen Magazine
- For the Como Las Grecas
