= Geoffrey Burton =

English cricketer

Geoffrey Cecil Burton (14 December 1909 – 4 April 1986) was an English first-class cricketer active 1930 who played for Middlesex. He was born in Stamford Hill; died in Eastbourne.
