= Sttellla =

Belgian rock band

Sttellla is a Belgian rock band named after Stella Artois Beer. They formed in 1978 in Brussels. The lead singer is Jean-Luc Fonck.

== Discography ==
Main releases, including live and compilation albums:

- A.B. Rose, (CD and DVD Live) 2008
- Torremolinos, 2008
- Le plus beau jour de magie, 2006
- Double, (CD and DVD) 2003
- Un homme avec un grand H au pays des prises de têtes, 2001
- Il faut tourner l'Apache, 1998
- Sttellla Live, 1997
- Consttelllation, (compilation) 1997
- The dark side of the moule, 1995
- Le meilleur du best of des plus grand greatest hits de Sttellla, (compilation) 1993
- Manneken pis not war / Faisez la mouche, pas la guêpe, 1992
- L'avenir est à ceux qui s'éléphanteau, 1990
- Sttellla (compilation) 1989
- Fuite au prochain lavabo, (LP) 1986
- Pouet-pouette (LP) 1978
