= Survivant =

Studio album by Starflam
- Released: 2001
- Genre: Hip-hop
- Length: 72:30
- Label: EMI

Starflam chronology
| Live & Direct (2000) | Survivant (2001) | Donne Moi de l'Amour (2003) |

Survivant (French word for Survivor) is the first album by Belgian hip hop group Starflam to be released by EMI. It achieved platinum disk status in Belgium, with more than 60,000 copies sold. In 2004, Starflam performed some concerts in Quebec (Canada) for the album's promotion in North America.

== Track listing ==
1. "Ultrastarflam" – 4:59
2. "Combattants" – 4:48
3. "Dans les startin' blocks" – 4:32
4. "La sonora" – 4:24
5. "Sous pression" – 4:16
6. "Mentalité de resquilleur" – 3:56
7. "Soir de dèche" – 2:09
8. "Amnésie internationale" – 5:01
9. "Ca tape dure" – 3:32
10. "Starflam All-Stars" – 1:37
11. "De frente" – 4:49
12. "Le vice" – 4:59
13. "Le msekise" – 4:37
14. "De cause à effet" – 4:40
15. "L'amour suze" – 4:01
16. "Choisi ton camp" – 4:38
17. "Péril urbain" – 5:33
