= Keep Quiet (album) =

Studio album by Sons
- Released: February 14, 2012
- Studio: Fox Den Studios (Nashville, Tennessee)
- Genre: Christian rock, indie rock, post-rock
- Length: 48:50
- Label: Slospeak
- Producer: Jared Fox

Keep Quiet is the first studio album from Sons. Slospeak Records released the album on February 14, 2012. Sons worked with Jared Fox, in the production of this album, at Fox Den Studio's located in Nashville, Tennessee.

== Critical reception ==
Professional ratings
Review scores
| Source | Rating |
|---|---|
| Christ Core | 5/5 stars |
| HM Magazine | 5/5 stars |
| Indie Vision Music | 5/5 stars |
| Jesus Freak Hideout | 4.5/5 stars |
| New Release Tuesday | 4.5/5 stars |
| Mind Equals Blown | 6.5/10 |

Awarding the album five stars from HM, Matthew Leonard states, "Amazing." Scott Fryberger, giving the album four and a half stars for Jesus Freak Hideout, writes, "driving rock with some ambience and some honest and passionate lyrics." Rating the album four and a half stars at New Release Tuesday, Mary Nikkel describes, "it is incredibly hard to swallow." Brody Barbour, awarding the album five stars by Indie Vision Music, says, "SONS have redefined the genre of indie rock for me and have created a new standard for any other band to try to top." Giving the album five stars from Christ Core, Brian Morrissette states, "It is a mind-blowing masterpiece." Samantha Esgro, rating the album a 6.5 out of ten for Mind Equal Blown, writes, "The overall musicianship throughout the album is astounding for such a young band."

== Track listing ==
| No. | Title | Length |
|---|---|---|
| 1. | "Masters of Flattery" | 2:51 |
| 2. | "Believe in Something" | 2:50 |
| 3. | "Keep Quiet" | 4:20 |
| 4. | "Retribution" | 4:30 |
| 5. | "Caution" | 4:40 |
| 6. | "Sea of Glass" | 2:52 |
| 7. | "Doubt" | 3:59 |
| 8. | "Under the Sun" | 4:03 |
| 9. | "Ghosts" | 5:56 |
| 10. | "Son on the Run" | 3:55 |
| 11. | "The Devil and I" | 2:50 |
| 12. | "Is This a Dry Season or Agnosticism" | 6:08 |
| Total length: | | 48:50 |
