= Belgian hip-hop =

Music genre

Belgian hip-hop music has a few rappers stemming from Africa and Italy. Belgium, like France, controlled African countries like the Democratic Republic of the Congo (formerly Zaire), Rwanda, and Burundi until the early 1960s. Like in France, immigrants from these countries started to study and live in Belgium.

The Belgian hip-hop scene started in the late 1980s with a U.S.-based techno/hip-hop group called Technotronic. In the group was an emcee named Ya Kid K from the Democratic Republic of the Congo who later led the group into international fame with hits like "Pump up the Jam" and "Shake That Body". In 1990, she also joined the group Hi-Tek 3 who were heard on Teenage Mutant Ninja Turtles: The Original Motion Picture Soundtrack.

However, the first major pop rapper from Belgium was Benny B, who had a very mainstream and commercial sound. According to the European Music Office's report on Music in Europe, this was the first of many pop acts that helped inspire a backlash and the creation of an underground hip-hop scene.

Also in the late 1980s in the Walloon south of the country, French speaking/rapping Starflam was the biggest name in hip-hop. In the Flemish north Dutch speaking/rapping groups like 't Hof van Commerce, Krapoel In Axe, St Andries MC's, and ABN were popular, rapping in their regional dialects.

Today, the Belgian hip-hop scene is growing. Rappers like Coely, Roméo Elvis and Damso are achieving commercial success in their country and abroad. Other contemporary rappers/formations are Stikstof, Woodie Smalls, L'Or Du Commun and Isha.
