= Elmore D =

Belgian blues musician

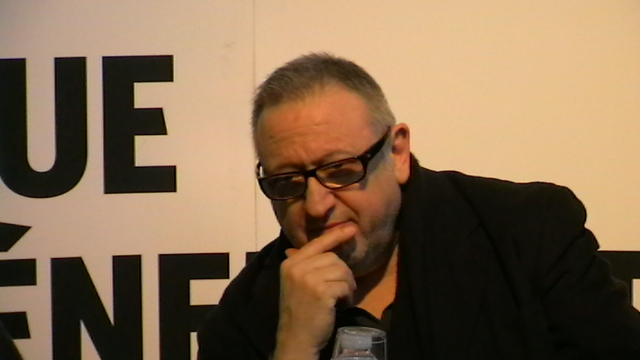
Elmore D at a discussion in Brussels

Elmore D (born Daniel Droixhe, 1946, near Liège, Belgium) is a Belgian blues musician. His is a professor at the University of Liège, where he lectures on the history and culture of Wallonia.

The name Elmore is a reference to Elmore James, whose slide guitar sound he used to imitate at the beginning of his career. In 1988, he was nominated for the Paris-Bagneux Blues Contest and played in "avant-première" of the Chicago Blues Festival. In 1997, he created the Elmore D Band with two ex-members of the Electric Kings, Big Dave (harp) and Willie Maze (drums), and the "sterguitarist" Lazy Horse (also with Flip Kawlier's band). They performed at various festivals:

- 12e Spring Blues Festival (Écaussinnes, 1999)
- 4th Blues in Bloom Festival (Houthalen, 2000)
- Belgium Rhythm and Blues Festival (Peer, Belgium, 2000)
- Nuit du Blues (Marcq-en-Barœul, 2001)
- Skoebustel Blues (Izegem, 2001)
- Drijf-In Blues Festival (Giethoorn, 2001)
- Sang a Klang (Luxembourg, 2002)
- Bluesfestivalen Mönsterås (Sweden, 2002)

Elmore D re-interprets pre-World War II blues music, in particular slide guitar players such as Casey Bill Weldon, Kokomo Arnold and Blind Willie McTell. He was influenced by jug and washboard musicians including the Memphis Jug Band, the Cannon Jug Stompers, Washboard Sam, Memphis Minnie, Big Bill Broonzy and Lead Belly. Other influences by more contemporary artists include the Electric Rag Band, the Country Blues Project (Germany), Preacher Boy, Gordon Smith, Paul Geremiah, Paul Rishell and Annie Raines.

He received the "Blues Trophée – Best European Artist 2001". Between 2005 and 2010, he wrote several blues songs in the Walloon language.
