= Absynthe Minded =

Belgian rock band

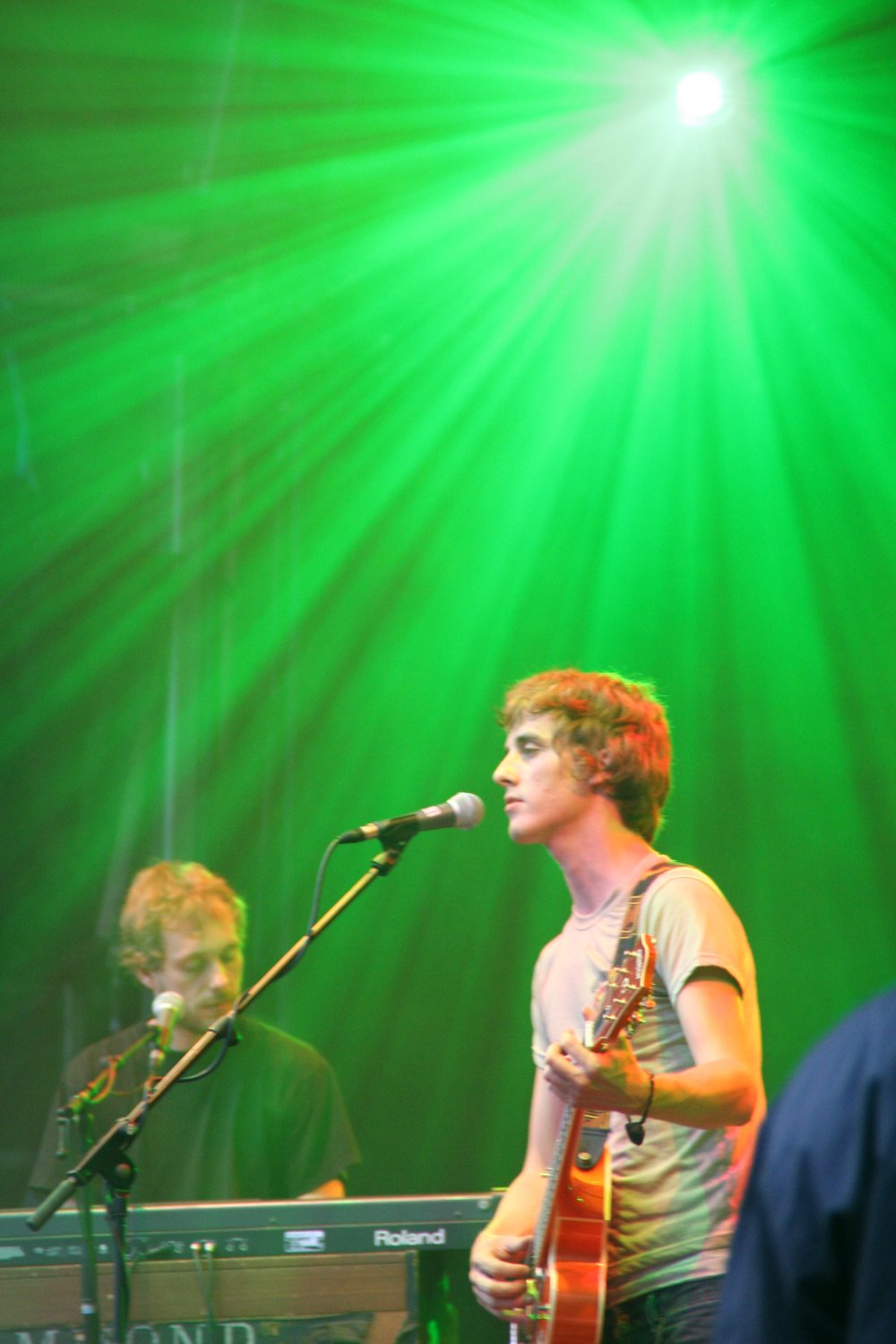
- Bert Ostyn (guitar) and Jan Duthoy

Background information
- Origin: Ghent, Belgium
- Genres: Rock; pop; jazz
- Years active: 1999–present
- Labels: Keremos, Universal
- Members: Bert Ostyn; Renaud Ghilbert; Jan Duthoy; Sergej Van Bouwel; Jakob Nachtergaele

Absynthe Minded is a Belgian rock band, around frontman, vocalist and guitarist Bert Ostyn. Their tracks contain a mix of thirties jazz, with a touch of funky soul, Balkan beats and Merseyside pop.

Absynthe Minded originally was a one-man band, being musician-singer-composer Bert Ostyn. He started off in 1999 with recording More Than This on 8-track in a 5 to 4 bedroom in Ghent, Belgium, with songs in a moderate rock genre.

The opportunity to record some material in a studio brought forth Mushroom Holiday (2000). On that demo other musicians collaborated with Ostyn for the first time, which led later on to the forming of a band called Tao Tse Tse. Ostyn’s third demo, Krankenhaus Hotel, was recorded in a noisy apartment bedroom again, on a Tascam four track.

The first band-demo was called Sweet Oblivion (2002); the band itself was renamed Absynthe Minded Quartet. Under this name they toured on their own and as support act for several bands and artists (most notably Spinvis and Zita Swoon).

2003 saw the release of their first official effort, the History makes Science Fiction EP, released on the Keremos label. The musicians were the same as before: Renaud Ghilbert, Sergej van Bouwel and Jan Duthoy but were joined by drummer Jakob Nachtergaele, playing the drums and woodblocks on one song. 'Quartet' was dropped from the band's name.

Their debut full-length album, Acquired Taste, was released in 2004, on the Keremos label and EMI Belgium. It was produced by Geoffrey Burton.

New Day was recorded in the end of January 2005 and was produced by producer Jean-Marie Aerts. After touring Belgium and the Netherlands, they recorded 16 songs and released the album in March in Belgium, Germany and the Netherlands. That summer, New Day was also to be released in Portugal. From this album came Absynthe Minded’s first single, "My Heroics, Part One", which gained much airplay.

In 2007 Absynthe Minded recorded their third album, There Is Nothing.

In August 2009, the album Absynthe Minded was released in Belgium and The Netherlands. The first two singles from the album were the tracks "Envoi" and "Moodswing Baby". In February 2010 at the Flemish Music Industry Awards they won prizes for Hit of the Year, best album, best rock/alternative and best band. After the release of Absynthe Minded the band was signed by the French Label AZ (Universal) for releases outside Belgium and The Netherlands. The album As It Ever Was was released in 2012.

In 2020, the band released the album Riddle of the Sphinx. The current lineup comprises founding members Bert Ostyn on vocals and guitar, Sergej Van Bouwel on bass, and new members Simon Segers on drums, Toon Vlerick on guitar, and Wouter Vlaeminck on keyboards and vocals.

== Members ==
- Bert Ostyn (vocals, guitar)
- Renaud Ghilbert (violin)
- Jan Duthoy (Hammond, piano)
- Sergej Van Bouwel (double bass, bass guitar)
- Jakob Nachtergaele (drums)

== Discography ==
- History Makes Science Fiction EP (2003)
- Acquired Taste (2004)
- New Day (2005)
- There Is Nothing (2007)
- Introducing (2008)
- Absynthe Minded (2009)
- As It Ever Was (2012)
- Jungle Eyes (2017)
- Riddle of the Sphinx (2020)
- Sunday Painter (2023)
