= Flip Kowlier =

Belgian singer-songwriter (born 1976)

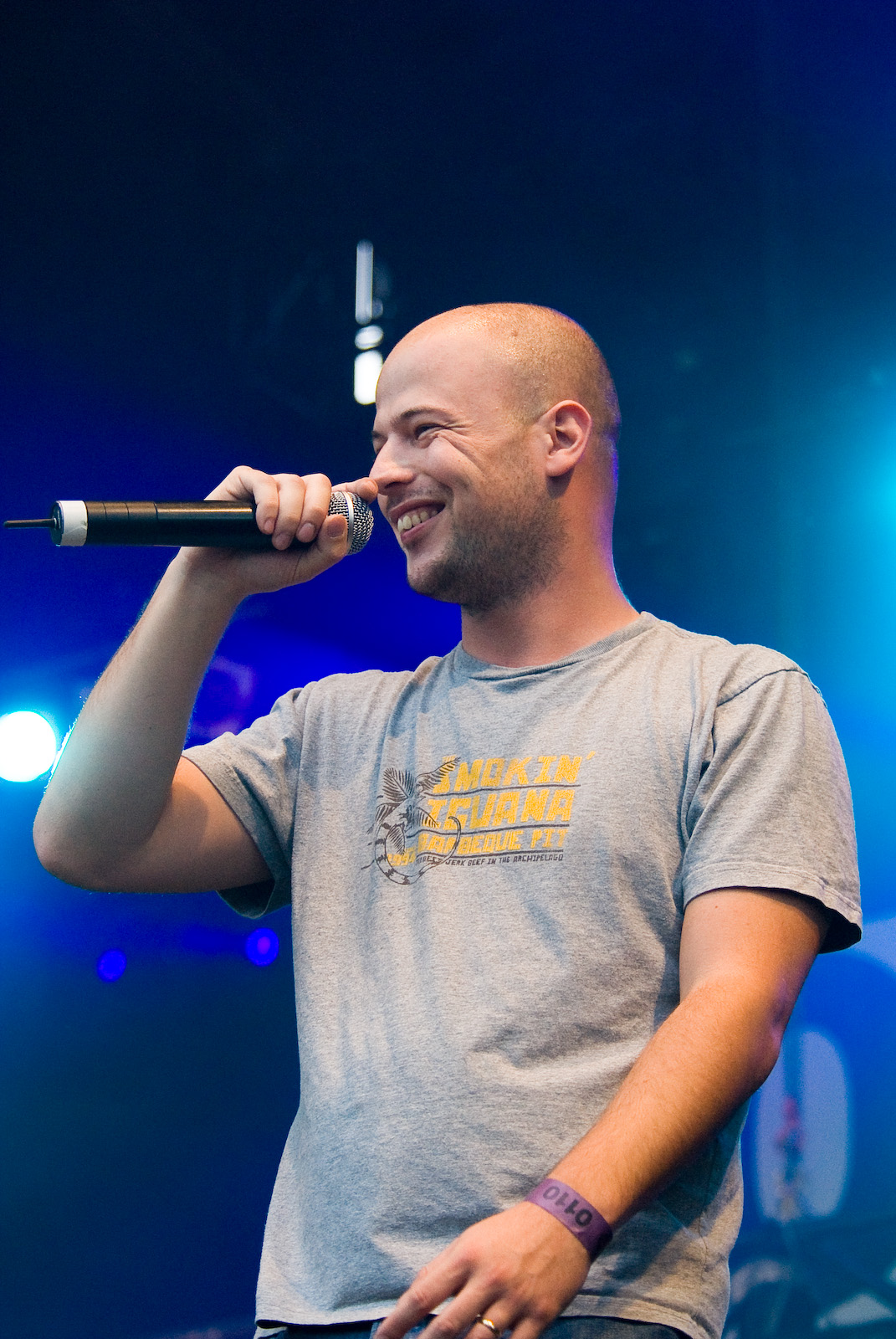
- Flip Kowlier in 2006
- Born: Filip Willy Mariette Cauwelier; 15 March 1976 (age 50); Izegem, Belgium
- Occupations: Singer; songwriter; rapper

Flip Kowlier (pseudonym of Filip Willy Mariette Cauwelier, born 15 March 1976 in Izegem, West Flanders) is a Belgian singer, songwriter and rapper. He sings in a distinct West Flemish dialect. He is an MC with the hip hop group, 't Hof van Commerce. In his solo work he sings and plays guitar, with Karel De Backer and Joost Van den Broeck on drums, Peter Lesage on keyboards and Pieter Van Buyten on bass guitar.

== Discography ==
=== Albums ===
==== Studio albums ====
Year	Album	Peak positions
Year	Album	BEL (FL)
2001	Ocharme ik	18
2004	In de fik	2
2007	De Man van 31	2
2010	Otoradio	2
2013	Cirque	9
2022	September	11

==== Compilation albums ====
Year	Album	Peak positions
Year	Album	BEL (FL)
2001	10 Jaar Flip Kowlier	50

=== Singles ===
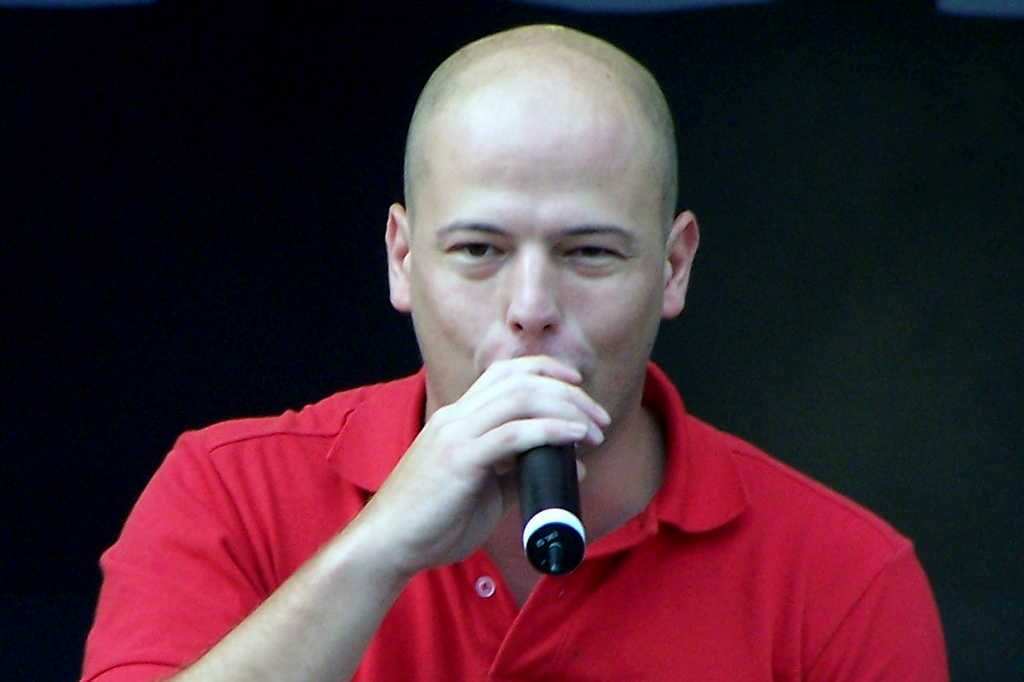
Flip Kowlier in 2005

Year	Album	Peak positions	
Year	Album	BEL (FL) Ultratop 50	BEL (FL) Ultratip*
2005	"Als de zomer weer voorbij zal zijn"	–	12
2006	"What's This?"	5	–
2007	"De grotste lul van 't stad"	20	–
2007	"Donderdagnacht"	28	–
2008	"Niemand"	–	23
2008	"El mundo kapotio"	–	17
2010	"Mo ba nin"	30	–
2010	"Zwembad"	–	4
2011	"Mama (No wo homme hon?)"	–	28
2011	"Geboren voe te leven"	–	3
2013	"Directeur"	41	–
2014	"Detox Danny"	–	28
2021	"September"	33	–

*Did not appear in the official Belgian Ultratop 50 charts, but rather in the bubbling under Ultratip charts.
