= Belgian jazz =

Music genre and scene

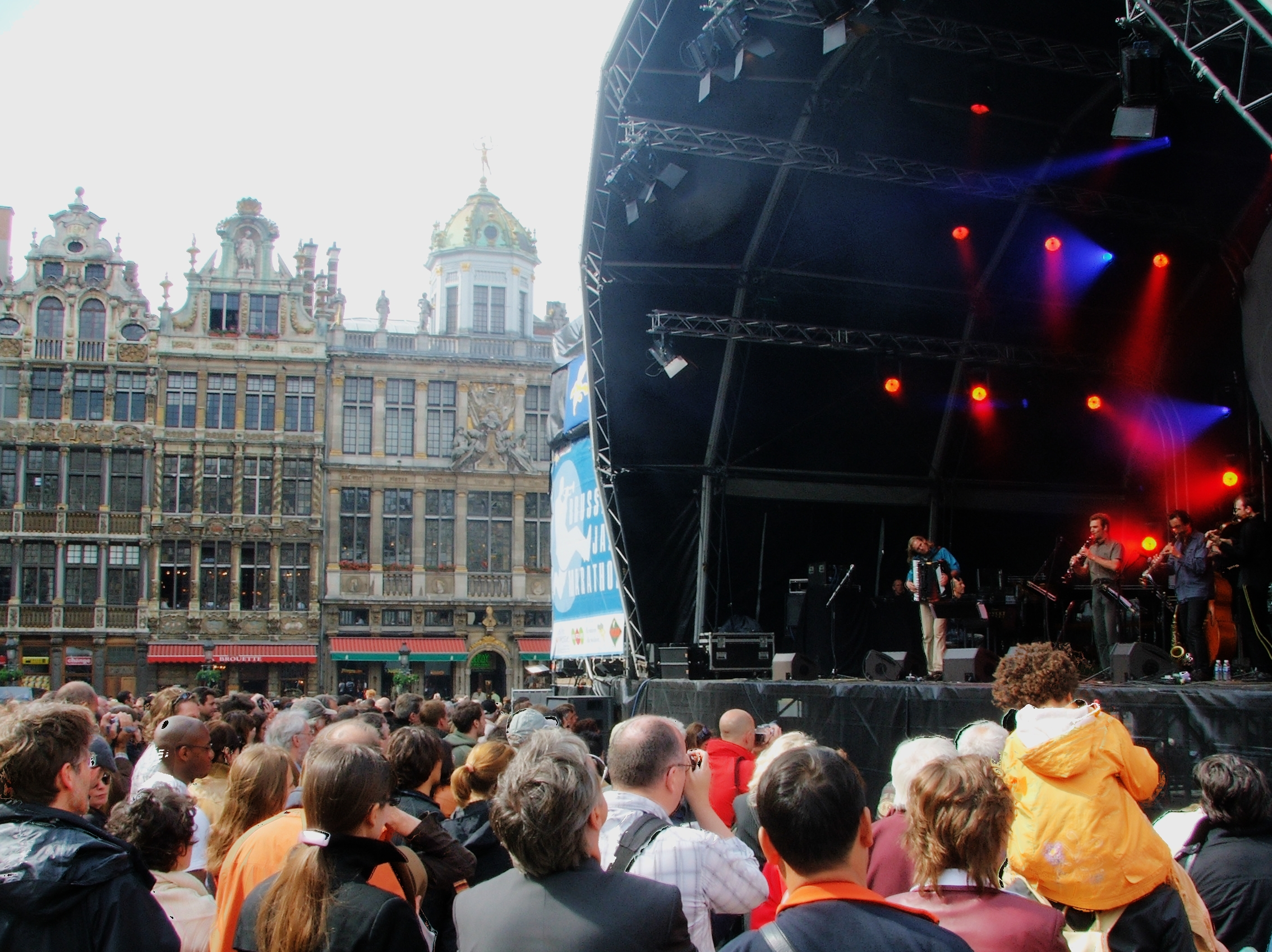
Brussels Jazz Marathon, Grand-Place, Brussels

The history of jazz in Belgium starts with the Dinant instrument maker Adolphe Sax, whose saxophone became part of military bands in New Orleans around 1900 and would develop into the jazz instrument par excellence. From then on the early history of jazz in Belgium virtually runs parallel to developments in the country of the birth of jazz, from the minstrel shows in the late 19th century until the first Belgian jazz album in 1927 and beyond.

Two important people in Belgium largely influenced the development of jazz in those early years: Félix-Robert Faecq and Robert Goffin.

The Belgian jazz history yielded many internationally known jazz musicians and composers such as the harmonica player and guitarist Toots Thielemans, guitarist Philip Catherine and the gypsy jazz guitarist Django Reinhardt.

== History ==
=== 19th century ===
The time before jazz developed was recognized as an individual style (1851–1912) and is now commonly known as the Pre-Jazz period. In this period of the Minstrels, the end of the 19th century, the first recording techniques emerged, which was very important for jazz and for music in general. In 1877, Thomas Edison developed the phonograph, which one year later was exhibited in Brussels, in the 'Panopcticum de Monsieur Castan'. Belgium, however, had no recording studios of its own and therefore the spread of pre-jazz music for a long time (until after the First World War) relied on foreign record labels such as "Colombia", "Zonophone" and "Favorite".

Another invention which to a large extent contributed to the development of jazz music was Adolphe Sax's new instrument. By 1890, saxophones in the United States were made by the Conn and Buescher companies, and Belgian virtuoso saxophonists such as Jean Moermans of Sousa's Orchestra ensured the growing popularity of the instrument. The saxophone quickly became the symbol of a new music genre that emerged gradually by the end of the 19th century. Belgian musicians were among the first to make recordings of saxophone solos in America. Eugene Coffin, for example, made recordings on wax cylinders (1895–1896) and Jean Moermans on gramophone record in Washington D.C. (1897).

In 1881, the first American minstrel show was staged in Belgium. It was followed, over the years, by similar shows and performances.

By 1900, Belgian music lovers had become acquainted with several American brass bands, the most famous of them being John Philip Sousa's orchestra. They played marches, symphonies, as well as "Cakewalks" and "Ragtimes", both characterized by syncopated rhythms. The Belgian composer Louis Frémaux followed in their footsteps and made a cakewalk composition entitled "Bruxelles Cake-Walk".

=== 1900–1918 ===
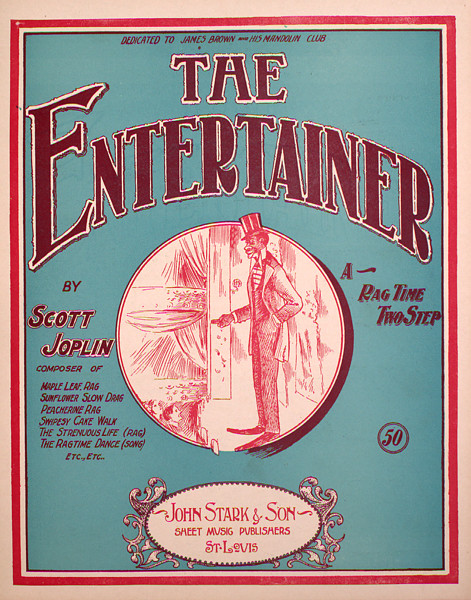
Ragtime number by Scott Joplin

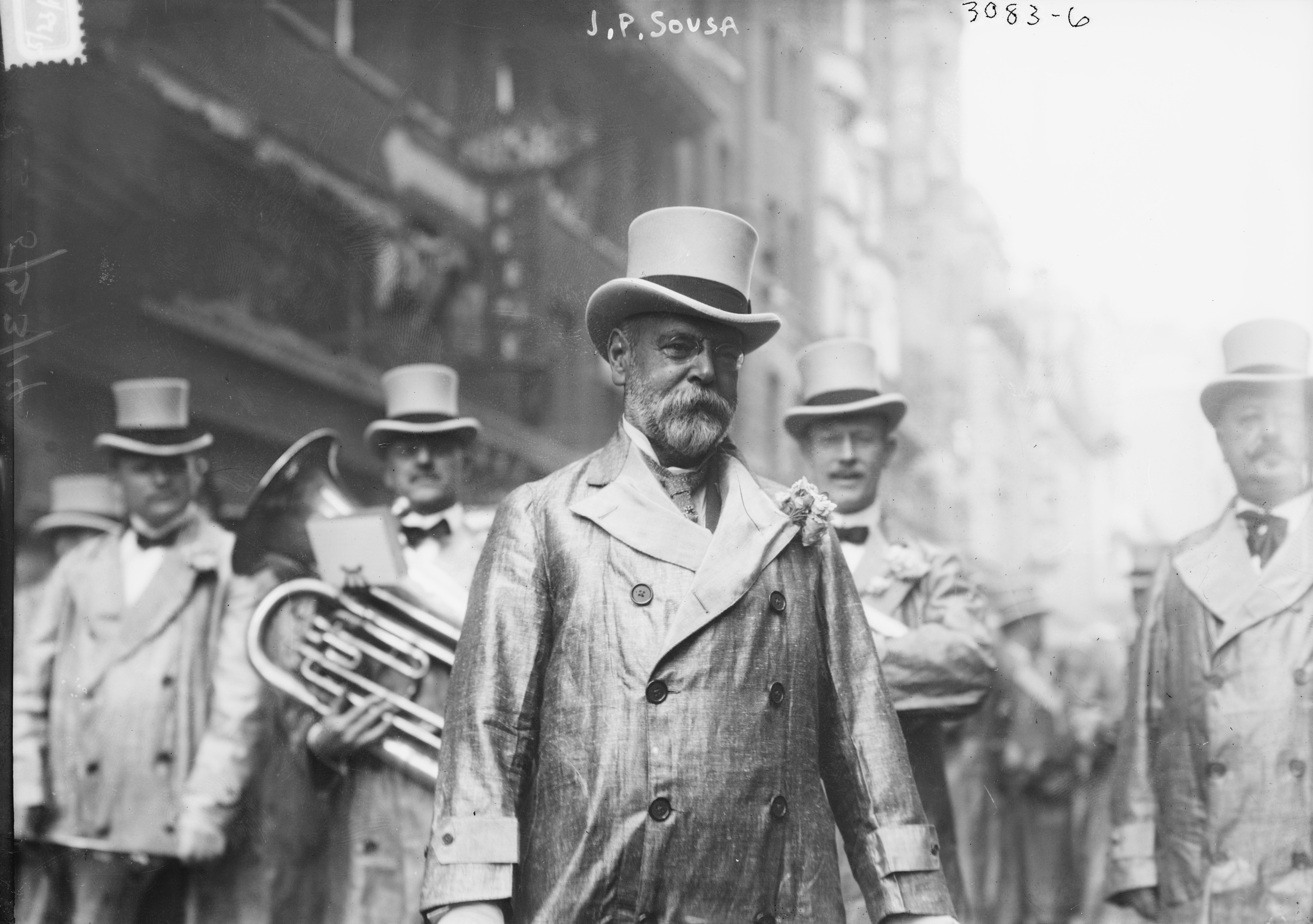
John Philip Sousa ca 1910

As a result of the colonial period in the history of Belgium, around 1900 there arose an interest in the gay 'Negro music' and their white imitators. Also, many new dances blew over that ousted the polkas, polonaises and other dances. Especially in Antwerp's and Brussels' nightlife, this syncopated music, which had started as a parody, had much success because of the atmosphere and danceability.

While in America the term rag and ragtime were popular, in Belgium it became fashionable to talk about 'intermezzo'. Ragtime was an eclectic mix of styles and a direct precursor to jazz. Many Belgian composers wrote ragtime scores at the time, but unfortunately there are no records left. In the same period, brass bands and military music flourished. The most renowned orchestra, with a number of Belgian musicians, was the American Orchestra of John Philip Sousa. Again, Belgian composers did successful work. An important year for the spread of American popular music was 1903, when John Philip Sousa's band toured in Belgium and performed at the international exposition of Brussels in may.

Louis Frémaux and his ragtime composition "Toboggan", released on the label 'Disque Pathé', was known throughout Europe in 1907. It was a golden time for ragtime in Belgium. Also, music of contemporaries like Jack Bruske was widely played or performed in bars, dance halls and theaters.

=== 1918–1930 ===
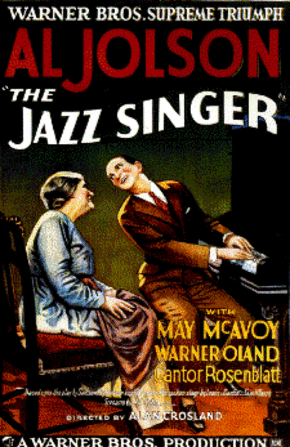
The Jazz Singer, 1927

In the 1920s and even more in the 1930s, Brussels, Antwerp and Liège emerged as the three Belgian centers of development of the new music. In summer, coastal cities such as Ostend took over and attracted vacationers in search of the 'blue notes'. This situation would last until the beginning of the 1990s, when other centers emerged such as Ghent and Bruges, while Liège was in relative decline because of the departure of several of the local jazz musicians after the disappearance of a number of small jazz venues.

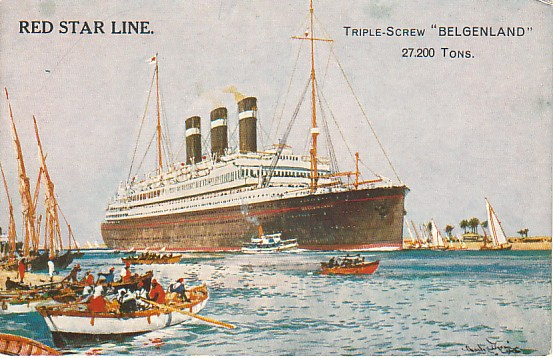
The "Belgenland", a ship of the Red Star Line, was the scene of Belgian jazz performances

It was only after the First World War that jazz actually became popular in Belgium, which was largely due to the efforts of Félix Faecq and Robert Goffin. Félix Faecq was introduced to jazz music in the postwar period after meeting American and Canadian soldiers who liberated the country. Robert Goffin heard two soldiers sing ragtime songs like "Are you from Dixie?" and the song "Robinson Crusoe" ("What did R.Crusoe do on Friday with Saturday night?"). Goffin played music with some classmates of the Brussels law school in the local bars and dance halls. During that time jazz was also synonymous with dance music. According to Faecq it was only when she saw the original black bands that he and his friend Goffin realized that jazz was more than just dance music. Together they discovered jazz music through listening to the Mitchell's Jazz Kings and other black bands in the Alhambra theater. In that period Belgium was in fact the 'jazz capital' of Europe. There were also successful white jazz bands, such as "The Georgians" with Charles Remue - now considered a pioneer of jazz in Belgium. From 1920 on he led his "The Bing Boys." With this band and other bands such as The White Diamonds and The Stompers he introduced the Dixieland style in Belgium. The band that introduced 'jazz' in Belgium is the black New York jazz band "Mitchell's Jazz Kings". On January 24, 1920, they had several gigs in the Brussels Théâtre de L'Alahambra. This was the first time the word "jazz" appeared on a poster in Belgium.

In those days the "Mohawks Jazz Band" (among others) was active in Antwerp and many other groups also embraced the new music, especially in Brussels and Antwerp. They modeled themselves mainly after the U.S. or Chicago Dixieland style, characterized by collective improvisation. Dozens of orchestras brought the Roaring Twenties to Belgium. Faecq made sure that the first Belgian jazz records of the Gennett label arrived in Belgium via Chicago and London. In 1924 he also published (along with his schoolmate Paul Mayaert) "Music Magazine", which is possibly the first music magazine in the world with serious articles about jazz. Later it was renamed "Music" and then "Actualité Musicale". After a visit to New Orleans, Robert Goffin wrote the first article in a series about the world of jazz: Aux frontières du Jazz ("The frontiers of jazz"), which he would later develop into an eponymous book. It was a breakthrough for the popularization of jazz in Belgium, because the only other existing journal, La Revue Musicale Belge, of Marcel Poot did not talk about jazz but about marching music.

In 1927, The Jazz Singer, one of the first American sound films, was played in the cinemas, with Al Jolson as the leading actor. That same year, publisher Félix Faecq discovered jazz clarinetist and alto saxophonist Charles Remue and his "New Stompers" playing dance music with a jazz arrangement in a Namur dancing. He took the orchestra to London, were on June 17, 1927, they made recordings for "Edison Bell Studios". The first historical Belgian jazz recording had become reality. The excellent musicians who were part of the recording sessions (such as Charles Remue and His New Stompers Orchestra) were jazz trumpeter Alfons Cockx, tenor saxophonist Gaston Frederic and the classically trained pianist Stan Brendus who would later become the founder of the first Radio Jazz Orkest (Radio Jazz Orchestra). They recorded fourteen songs that would become popular when they reached the homeland. Even from a European perspective it was pioneering work, because at that time, apart from Belgium, only France and England could draw on a few experienced jazz musicians. On that first Belgian jazz record, they covered some American hits from that era such as "Ain't she sweet" but Remue still managed to record more than half (7 out of 13) Belgian compositions. These included the popular" Wladivostok", "Slow Gee gee "Alahabad" and "Pamplona," all compositions by David Bee and Peter Packay.

In 1928, Peter Packay and his "Red Robins" recorded a new album at London's Edison Bell Studios. The composers, Peter Packay and David Bee, wrote several well received songs like "High Tension" and "Obsession". This duo also made records in the United States. Meanwhile, Faecq had become a central figure of the Belgian jazz, and almost all jazz musicians and composers of some renown eventually came to him. He also made good use of his contacts with London publishers to provide Belgian professional musicians with the latest jazz scores so that they did not have to rely on just hearing the records. After first having distributed the scores, Faecq became agent and publisher for the Stazny publishers in London and sold the original jazz scores in Belgium. His "Universal Music Store" became a kind of warehouse where Belgian jazz musicians could draw on.

In the 1920s, there were plenty of Belgian jazz musicians working in dance halls, cinemas, theaters, bars, cafes and 'cabarets chantants'. Musicians and bands could even be engaged for several weeks in the same venue. Belgian musicians also traveled abroad and made recordings. David Bee said in an interview: "For a decent orchestra at that time” (1928–30) “there was always work." Good jazz orchestras were indeed still a rare breed in Europe.

Jazz musicians also found work on the steamers of the Europe-America lines. David Bee, for example, was bandleader on the ocean liner Ile de France. Two American ships of the Red Star Line, the "Belgian Country" and the "Lapland", transporting passengers between Antwerp and New York, offered many Belgian musicians a contract. An additional advantage was that it gave them the opportunity to make international contacts and enabled them to visit the country where jazz originated.

=== 1930–1940 ===
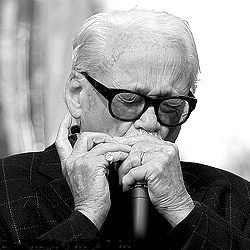
Toots Thielemans

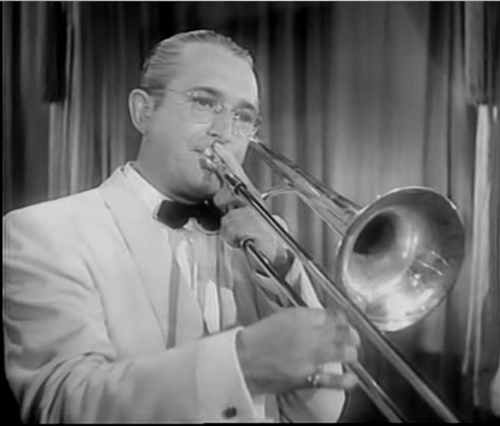
Tommy Dorsey's big band was very popular in the 1930s and 1940s and was a major inspiration for Belgian musicians to begin forming big bands of their own.

At the end of the 1920s experiments were carried out with Belgian radio broadcasting, and in 1930 the NIR/INR (Nationaal Instituut voor de Radio-Omroep - Institut National de Radiodiffusion) was founded. On the radio, many newly released American records were played. In 1932 Faecq founded the "Jazz Club de Belgique" and Goffin published his first jazz books. With his Jazz Club de Belgique Faecq organized an annual international tournament for amateur musicians. During this period the innovating music of Louis Armstrong reached Belgian listeners as well. Goffin immediately understood the genius of this musician and started to write about him, and later befriended his idol. Goffin wrote in his Aux Frontieres du Jazz about "the true genius of jazz" (Armstrong) and the "black jazz" that he had discovered. He also wrote a book, dedicated to Armstrong: "Louis Armstrong, le Roi du Jazz"(1947).

The early 1930s brought two Belgian trumpet players to the fore that took control of the Belgian jazz scene: Robert De Kers and Gus Deloof. In 1926 De Kers had taken over leadership of Packay orchestra. He then went abroad and after the disintegration of his group he founded the Cabaret Kings in Spain, consisting of one part black musicians, a few Spaniards and five Belgians. He continued performing with this group up to the Spanish Civil War in 1931. After he left, The Cabaret Kings remained active for another 20 years, with varying line-ups. A typical formation of that time consisted of the following musicians: trumpeter De Kers, saxophonists Jean Robert (nicknamed "the Belgian Coleman Hawkins"), Oscar Toussaint and André Geysens, bassplayer Fernand Fonteyn, pianist Henry Segers and... guitarist Toots Thielemans.

In the U.S.A. the swing era dawned in the 1930s with big bands and smaller combos that brought exciting swing dance music. Some American orchestras came to Belgium. Their performances proved inspiring. In 1936, there were three major Belgian big bands: the band of saxophonist Fud Candrix, Stan Brenders and Jean Omer. Candrix would lead several bands and make a hundred records. Clarinetist Jean Omer formed his first orchestra in 1926 after listening to records of King Oliver and Louis Armstrong. In 1937 he opened his nightclub Le Boeuf sur le toit ("The Ox on the Roof") in Brussels where his orchestra "Jean Omer Jazz Orchestra" (with 16 to 18 musicians) performed alongside other jazz bands. The same year, pianist and composer Stan Brenders formed his own orchestra for the NIR-INR, officially named the Big jazz orchestra of Belgium (Het grote jazzorkest van België - Le grand orchestre jazz de Belgique). The rhythm section gained international fame and was even compared with that of Count Basie. This orchestra played several jazz compositions and film music in a typical American swing style.

In 1938, Hans Philippi founded the Antwerp Jazz Club (AJC).

In 1939 the 'Band battle' took place, an exchange concert with the famous Dutch band The Ramblers playing on the NIR-INR and the orchestra of Stan Brenders playing at VARA in Hilversum. Brenders, who played solid swing numbers, won the 'battle' in a convincing way. Later in life, Brenders would make many recordings for radio and also had the opportunity to work with Django Reinhardt. He also acquired fame as a composer, with songs like "So Many People" and "I envy" performed by Nat King Cole. The "Symphonic Jazz Orchestra of Belgium" (Symfonisch Jazz Orkest van België - Orchestre Jazz Symphonique de Belgique) - with 40 musicians - was founded by him. Many new bands emerged as a result of the activities of these three jazz musicians (Candrix, Brenders and Omer) and for many musicians the great pre-war big bands and other ensembles ensured a fixed income. The arrangements were usually supplied by the aforementioned Peter Packay and David Bee. And then there was the classically trained musician Frank Engelen, an excellent guitarist but also a well respected composer and arranger. He wrote notable compositions such as 'Badinage', 'Bagatelle ', 'La Piste', 'Avondschemering' (Twilight) and 'Studio 24'.

=== 1940–1960 ===
==== The 1940s ====
During World War II jazz music was banned by the occupying Germans and therefore was forced to go underground. Even so, it seemed to flourish more than ever. Belgian orchestras continued to make new recordings and new bands kept popping up. Few records reached Europe, and of course no American bands were touring Belgium. This situation forced the public to settle for homegrown musicians and these much sought-after bands were often very successful. Jazz musicians were clever enough to 'adjust' the names of the songs they recorded to work around the official ban on American music. Thus, for example, Honeysuckle Rose was renamed "Rose de Miel" and Stardust was recorded as "Poussière d'étoile". There were also new jazz organizations such as the "Swing Club de Belgique" and the club "Sweet and Hot". The major big bands like Robert De Kers and his Cabaret Kings performed regularly in the Brussels Centre for Fine Arts and in the hall of the Antwerp Zoo.

After the liberation in 1945 the jazz scene in the United States had changed, and "bop" (or bebop) had become the latest thing. Characterized by its virtuosity, harmonic complexity and tempo changes, bebop brought about a stylistic revolution. The big names were now Dizzy Gillespie and Charlie Parker, and Europeans learned about this new style of jazz when American records became available. In Belgium swing music was at its peak. The Belgian 'Lady of Swing' was Lucy Barcey. She was accompanied by the band of De Kers, among others.

After the war, jazz became popular throughout Europe. In 1946 Don Redman’s orchestra toured in Europe, followed in 1947 by Sidney Bechet (visiting Antwerp and Brussels) and Louis Armstrong. Likewise, the bands of Duke Ellington, Lionel Hampton, Count Basie and others would regularly visit Belgium. Jazz in the form of dance music, mostly swing, was now played in bars, clubs and various venues by the Belgian bands of Boyd Bachmann, The Jump College, Henry Segers and his Belgian stars, Ernst van 't Hof, Jeff De Boeck and others. These orchestras could count on a large crowd of spectators wherever they came, because the soldiers of the liberation armies appreciated the music of the often highly professional Belgian bands. A number of jazz musicians also turned to the new bop style. In the period after 1950 there was a renewed interest in Europe for the old styles, especially for New Orleans music. At the New Orleans Dixieland festival in Paris in 1954 the Dixie Stompers from Mons were on the bill.

Many American musicians went to Belgium (and to Europe in general) in the early 1950s to live and perform there. Conversely, Belgian jazz musicians also enjoyed success in the States, among them guitarist and harmonica player Toots Thielemans, vibraphonist Fats Sadi, trumpet player Sandy Herman and saxophonist Jack Sels. Other Belgians toured in Europe with American bands, among them singer Yettie Lee who went to Paris with Roy Eldridge.

Bop, modern jazz, also found fertile ground in Belgium. Guitarist Bill Alexander teamed up with bassist John Warland and recorded Charlie Parker's Ornithology in 1946, one of the first bebop recordings in Europe. One of the major bands playing in that style was The Bob Shots from Liège, with Toots Thielemans as a guitarist. Some of the best jazz musicians in Belgium at one time played in this band: the talented flautist and saxophonist Bobby Jaspar, saxophonist Jacques Pelzer and guitarist René Thomas. Bobby Jaspar was later influenced by musicians like Stan Getz and 'converted' to the cool jazz school. In his short career (he died at the age of 37) he played with such greats as Chet Baker, Kenny Burrell, Miles Davis, John Coltrane and Donald Byrd.

In 1934 the Belgian gypsy guitarist Django Reinhardt formed the quintet Hot Club de France with the French violinist Stéphane Grappelli, his brother Joseph and Roger Chaput on guitar and Louis Volla on bass. At the outbreak of the war, during a tour in England, Django left Grappelli behind and returned to Paris, where in 1940 he recorded his famous song Nuages with jazz saxophonist and clarinetist Hubert Rostaing. After the war, in 1946, Django Reinhardt went to the States where he performed and recorded with jazz greats like Duke Ellington. Together with Charlie Christian and Wes Montgomery, he is now - even outside jazz - considered one of the most influential guitarists ever. Django's style, jazz manouche or gypsy jazz, keeps attracting new jazz musicians all over the world, and the number of bands playing in this style is still growing. In Belgium, Fapy Lafertin probably is he best known representative of modern jazz manouche. The Django d'Or awards, originally organized in Paris as a tribute to Django Reinhardt, now ranks samong the most prestigious jazz prizes awarded to deserving musicians. Since the 1990s more countries outside France organize their own Django d'Or awards. In Belgium the Gent Jazz Festival and Dinant Jazz Nights in turn organize Django d'Or awards, alternatively honoring Dutch and French speaking musicians and bands.

==== The 1950s ====
The early 1950s in the United States was the period of cool (or west coast) jazz, more peaceful than bebop, and with a more outspoken interest in composition and arrangement. The Antwerp saxophonist Jack Sels became the leader of the All Stars Bop Orchestra, inspired by the Afro-Cuban big bands of Dizzy Gillespie and Stan Kenton. Later, he would organize his Jack Sels Chamber Music band. In Paris, Sadi also started up his own big band, for which he composed and arranged. In jazz circles he was considered the best European vibraphonist, in the tradition of Milt Jackson. Francy Boland managed to distinguish himself in the United States, where he worked with the bands of Count Basie and Benny Goodman, and with jazz pianist Mary Lou Williams. Bobby Jaspar remained a wonderful "cool" soloist on flute and tenor sax. In New York he played, among others, with J.J. Johnson and Miles Davis. Shortly before his untimely death in 1963, he set up a last vigorous quintet with his friend and guitarist René Thomas from Liège. René Thomas also crossed the Atlantic and ended up recording with Sonny Rollins in 1957. His most loyal partner and friend was Jacques Pelzer who, after the adventure with the Bob Shots, imposed himself in this decade as an outstanding musician of European jazz.

At the end of the 1950s there were three young musicians who came to prominence on the Belgian jazz scene. Drummer Félix Simtaine (1938) debuted in the quartet of Robert Jeanne and then accompanied a series of American and Belgian soloists. Richard Rousselet (1940) was Belgium's first modern hardbop trumpet player, and would collect several awards abroad. Guitarist Philip Catherine (1942), even before his twentieth year, jammed at la Rose Noir, played at the festivals of Comblain and Ostend and toured Europe with Lou Bennett. After 1965 he also started to compose.

=== The 1960s ===
The 1960s saw the emergence of free jazz in the United States and the rise of the supremacy of rock. The popularity of jazz music after the golden days of swing was waning everywhere and now seemed to eclipse in favor of more danceable popular music. Most people did not like to hear bebop or freejazz, and jazz had become the music of a few insiders. Not only was the audience for jazz shrinking, but it also lost young jazz musicians who in previous periods had taken initiative, and now were more attracted to pop. Of course, besides showing interest in free jazz (also called "New Thing"), most Belgian musicians continued to play the older styles (New Orleans was especially popular in Flanders) and bebop (cool jazz included), while mainstream swing was still in demand.

Apart from Fred Van Hove (piano), Babs Robert (alt sax), José Bedeur and some others, the Belgian jazz musicians did not really participate in free jazz, which had more followers in Germany and the Netherlands. The orchestra of the RTB disappeared in 1965, but was taken over by that of the BRT, led by Etienne Verschueren. In the absence of employment in Belgium many musicians were associated with orchestras abroad. Jacques Pelzer worked in Italy, touring with Chet Baker; Toots Thielemans worked in Germany and Sweden, composed his hit Bluesette, and then returned to the U.S. in 1964; René Thomas set up a new quartet with Jaspar, played with Pelzer and Lee Konitz at European festivals, before falling back into a lean period in 1966.

Still, despite these tough times for jazz, a few young musicians managed to get noticed: Jean-Pierre Gebler (bariton sax), Robert Graham (guitar), Marc Moulin (piano), John Linsman (trumpet), Robert Pernet (drums), Bruno Castellucci (drums) and Snowy Struvay (trumpet). New clubs opened: the Blue Note and Pol's Jazz Club in Brussels, the Jazz Inn in Liège, and the Jazz Clu Hnita in Heist-Op-Den-Berg.

Large outdoor gatherings called "festivals" were organized. Comblain-la-Tour is the oldest: the first edition took place in 1959.

=== The 1970s ===
Although rock still dominated in the 1970s, musical styles began to interpenetrate. With Miles Davis, jazz electrified and flirted with rock. In the United States the new style was baptized "jazz-rock", giving rise to European bands like the British group Soft Machine. A number of Belgian artists are associated with this style, also called "Fusion": Philip Catherine, Jack Van Poll, Jacques Pelzer, Richard Rousselet, Robert Jeanne and Felix Simtaine. Some musicians of the new generation made it their niche: Marc Moulin, Michel Herr (piano), Charles Loos (piano), Paolo Radoni (guitar), Steve Houben (alt sax, flute), Janot Buchem (electric bass ) and Micheline Pelzer (drums). Typical for jazz rock is the replacement of acoustic instruments (guitar, bass and piano) by their electric version. These new sounds had the advantage of bringing the rock audience closer to jazz. The recording of jazz music took a new start, often by independent labels. Popular groups at that time were Placebo (Marc Moulin), Cosa Nostra (Jack Van Poll), Open Sky Unit (Pelzer), Kleptomania and Arkham (Radoni), Solis Lacus (Herr), Cos and Abraxis (Loos). In 1971, René Thomas returned to the forefront by joining Stan Getz' new quartet. Meanwhile, Toots Thielemans was touring and recording in the U.S., with Quincy Jones, Paul Simon, Bill Evans and others. In Flanders, Etienne Verschueren toured with his sextet.

Up to approximately the 1970s jazz history was more or less a succession of stylistic periods, a development that was entirely situated in America. Jazz had become an international language. From the late 1980s on it became difficult to describe the direction jazz has taken. So many different jazz styles and trends exist that the student of jazz does not get a clear view on this fragmented musical landscape.

=== The 1980s ===
At the turn of the 1980s, jazz came back in force, although it did not find its way to the general public. This return is due in part to the emergence around 1984 of the compact disc, enabling reissues of many jazz classics; the illustrious labels (Blue Note, Pacific, Verve, Impulse!..) were again widely available. However, the total sales of jazz records (about 3-5%) remained low, and attendance to clubs did not profit from the new media. The theme of jazz came up more regularly in advertising and in the daily and weekly press, as well as on the radio. Television still did not pay much attention to jazz. The best sign of this newfound health, at European level, was the appearance – and even, in some countries like France, proliferation – of new festivals in the late 1970s, and especially in the 1980s.

Festivals originated in this period are: the festivals of Gouvy, Franchimont, Mortroux, Ostend, Brosella, Rossignol (Gaume Jazz Festival), Oupeye (Jazz au Château), the Belga Jazz Festival, the Festival des Lundis d’Hortense.

=== Present time ===
Belgium has yielded a relatively high number of world-class jazz musicians: Philip Catherine, Steve Houben, Bert Joris, Charles Loos, Jean-Louis Rassinfosse, Michel Herr, Philippe Aerts, Peter Hertmans, Erwin Vann, Nathalie Loriers, Ivan Paduart, Phil Abraham, David Linx, Diederik Wissels, the Brussels Jazz Orchestra, Aka Moon... And the tradition is kept alive by a new generation of young and promising musicians in a variety of jazz styles: old-style mainstream, big band, bebop, all forms of modern jazz like the ‘’jazz rock’’, avant-garde and free improvisation, Latin jazz and electric Brazilian fusion, acid jazz, world jazz, etc. Furthermore, musicians of the older generation who are still alive and kicking keep making notable records and are performing at a high level. Toots Thielemans for one is still prominent on the jazz scene. In 2009 he was one of the main attractions during the Night of the Proms in Antwerp, and in March 2010 he played eight shows at the Blue Note Festival in New York. Composer/pianist Jef Neve, born in 1977, has quickly become a prominent figure of Belgian jazz, and his international reputation is still growing. The famous British jazz critic Stuart Nicholson wrote of him: "His very personal approach to the piano trio announces the arrival of a huge promising young musician that has the potential to become an important voice in the European jazz scene to be."

In 2012, there were three leading Belgian jazz magazines: Jazz'halo, Jazz Around (the French partner of Jazz'halo) and Jazzmozaïek, sponsored by the Flemish government. An important organization for the promotion of jazz was Centrum De Werf in Bruges, managed by Rik Bevernage. De Werf organizes jazz concerts, mainly for American and Belgian jazz musicians. According to jazz impresario Jos Demol, the publisher of Jazz'halo, the Belgian jazz scene is generally spoken strongly focused on American jazz. Only a few musicians did their own thing and found their own way: Fred van Hove, Kris Defoort and Gilbert Isbin for example. Demol also noted little real interaction between clubs from different countries, although the differences are sometimes marked with stereotypes as "the clownish Italians", "the romantic French", "the ironic Dutch" and "the straightforward Germans". According to Demol, Belgian jazz could benefit from a mutual influence of styles.

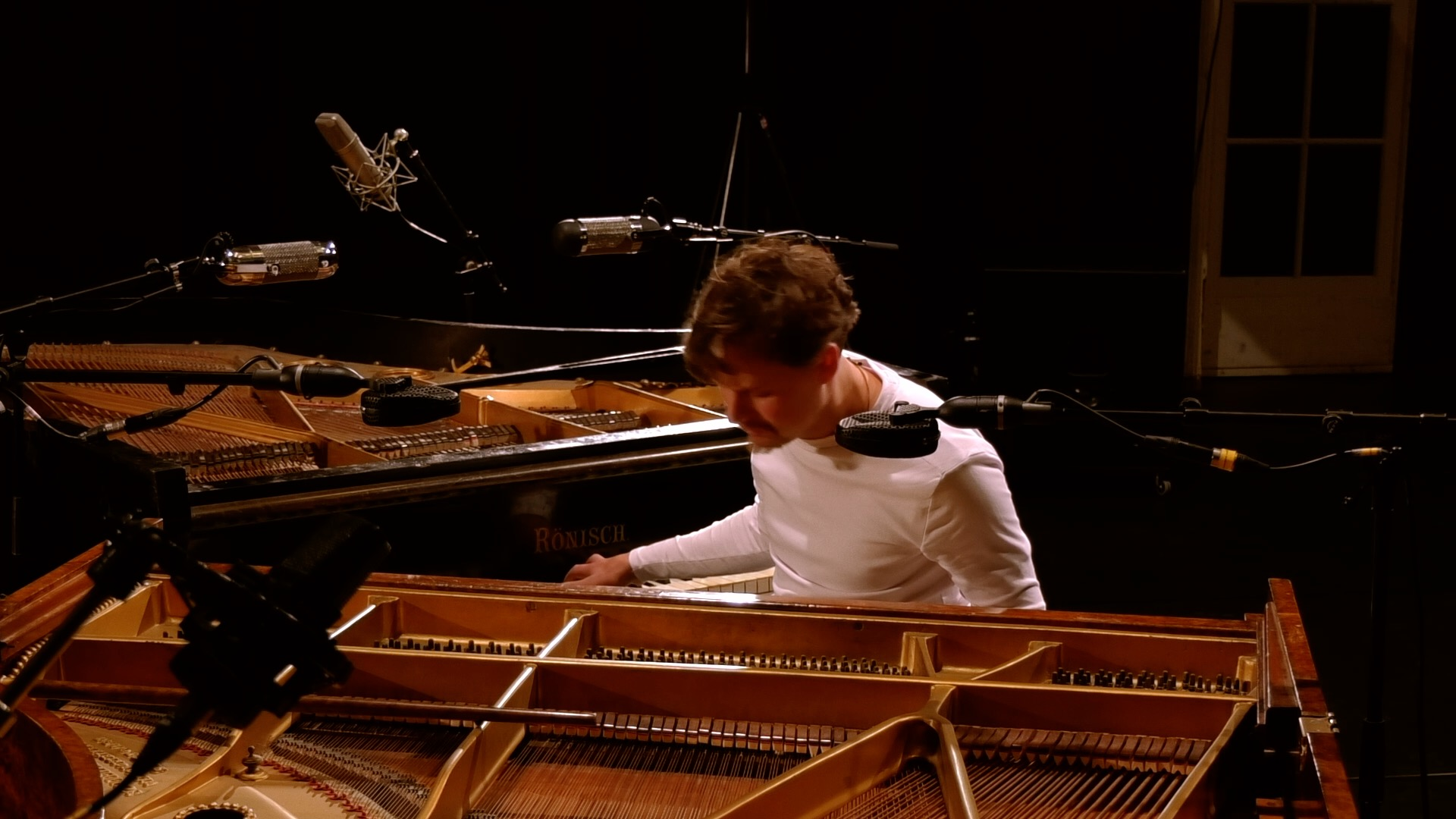

Following in the footsteps of Fred Van Hove and Kris Defoort is pioneer and jazz pianist Seppe Gebruers. He is considered the first in the world to improvise microtonally. He plays two grand pianos that are tuned a quarter tone apart. With this, he improvises freely with free jazz veterans such as Paul Lovens and Paul Lytton, but also plays with Jazz Standards.

The Brussels Jazz Orchestra big band orchestra wrote Belgian jazz history when at the end of March 2012 it was invited to a series of gigs in the famous New York Blue Note Jazz Club. Up to that date, only one Belgian had had the privilege, and that Belgian was, of course, Toots Thielemans.

At the educational level, self-education that characterized previous generations, is now increasingly replaced by training in schools, at workshops and seminars. Several Belgian musicians are traveling to the United States to attend classes at Berklee College in Boston, the most famous jazz school in the world. Nowadays, jazz teaching is also organized in Belgium. At the initiative of Henri Pousseur, the Liège Conservatory organized a Jazz Seminar, which would run from 1979 to 1985. Many young emerging musicians were formed there, as well as in the class of Improvisation by Garrett List. Today, the Jazz Studio in Antwerp and the Brussels Conservatory provide jazz education at an advanced level.

The international competition for young jazz ensembles and composers in Hoeilaart, "Europ Jazz Contest Hoeilaart" for a long time was the only significant Belgian jazz competition, but today there is also the contest "Jong Jazz Talent" (Young Jazz Talent) in Ghent.

== Belgian jazz awards ==
- Django d'Or
- RTBF / VRT Jazz Referendum with an "Award of the Listener" and "Price of Criticism"
- Nicolas Dor SABAM Prize for the best Belgian jazz band playing their own composed music at the Jazz Festival of Liège
- Octaves de la Musique / Jazz, organized by "Le Conseil de la Musique", RTL and SABAM; only for French-speaking Belgium
- Klara Muziekprijzen / Jazz (Klara Music Awards) / Jazz, presented by Radio Klara (VRT) with the "Prijs van de Luisteraar voor het beste album van het jaar" (Award of the Listener for best album of the year)
- Toots Thielemans Jazz Award

== See also ==
- Jazz Center Flanders, archive, documentation center and museum in Dendermonde
- Dutch jazz
