= Igloo Records =

- Founded: 1978
- Distributor(s): In Akustik (Germany), Discovery (UK), New Arts International & LC Music (Benelux), Naxos (Canada), Distrijazz (Spain), Socadisc (France), Jazz World (Hong Kong), Narrator (Hungary), Koshin, Flau & Marquee (Japan), Believe (digital)
- Genre: Jazz, world, experimental
- Country of origin: Belgium
- Location: Brussels
- Official website: www.igloorecords.be

Igloo Records is a record label run by the not-for-profit association Sowarex in Brussels, Belgium that concentrates on jazz and world music. Igloo is the best-known of five imprints run by Sowarex. According to one of its founders, the label was developed when the local scene was enhanced by the arrival of American jazzmen that included JR Montrose and Chet Baker.

- Igloo, created in 1978, releases albums by Belgian jazz musicians Anne Wolf, Charles Loos, Diederik Wissels, Eric Legnini, Félix Simtaine, Ivan Paduart, Jacques Pelzer, Mélanie De Biasio, Michel Herr, Nathalie Loriers, Pascal Schumacher, Philip Catherine, Philippe Aerts, Manu Louis, drummer Antoine Pierre (Urbex) and Steve Houben.
- Rainland released English-speaking projects by Klaus Klang, Tom Wolf, Owen Curtiz and others but folded in 1994.
- Franc'Amour, named after a now-defunct festival, focused on French-speaking song and promoted noted singers such as Maurane, Claude Semal, Marc Lelangue, and Walloon singer William Dunker.
- IglooMondo was set up in 2005 and was home to world-based projects such as Mokoomba, Majid Bekkas, the late Wendo Kolosoy, Kel Assouf and bassist Manou Gallo.
- Iglectic released left-field material such as Flat Earth Society, X-Legged Sally and L'Ensemble Musique Nouvelles.
- Factice, created in 2013, showcased more contemporary Belgian French-speaking artists such as Mochélan, Karim Gharbi and Tomassenko.

The various activities are currently concentrated around the Igloo label. Together, the labels released almost 350 CDs over a period spanning 40 years. In 2019, the label's various activities were celebrated in a book, "Igloo Records en quarante mouvements", published by Arsenic2.
