= Philippe Aerts =

Belgian jazz double bassist (born 1964)

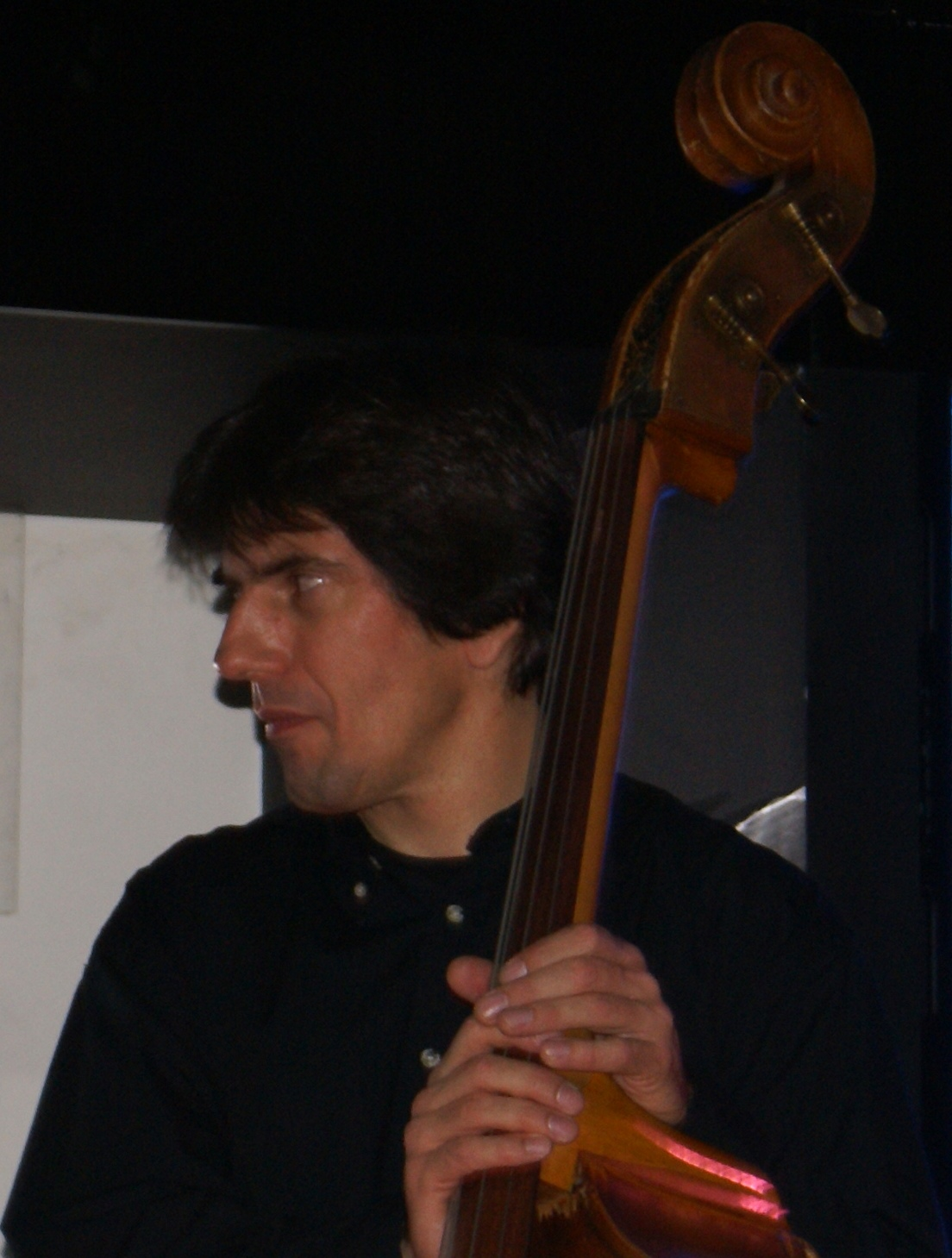

Background information
- Born: June 21, 1964 (age 60); City of Brussels, Belgium
- Genres: Jazz; Brazilian music
- Instrument(s): Double bass, bass

Philippe Aerts (born 21 June 1964) is a Belgian jazz double bassist. He taught himself guitar and electric bass guitar when he was 11 and started playing the double bass at age 14. He is a member of Philip Catherine trio and the Ivan Paduart trio. He also has his own trio with John Ruocco (tenor saxophone and clarinet) and Tony Levin (drums) and quartet with Bert Joris (trumpet). He won the Belgian Golden Django in 2002 for best Belgian artist.

== Bands ==
He has recorded with:

- Charles Loos trio
- Diederik Wissels trio
- Nathalie Loriers
- Michel Herr
- Jacques Pelzer
- Steve Houben
- Ivan Paduart trio
- Philip Catherine trio
- Bert Joris quartet
- Toshiko Akiyoshi Jazz Orchestra

He has toured with:

- Richard Galliano and Gary Burton
