= Vodenicharov =

Vodenicharov or Vodenitcharov (Воденичаров) is a Bulgarian-language surname. Notable people with the surname include:

- Dimitar Vodenicharov (born 1987), Bulgarian footballer
- Boyan Vodenitcharov (born 1960), Bulgarian pianist and composer
