= Brussels Jazz Orchestra =

Belgian jazz orchestra

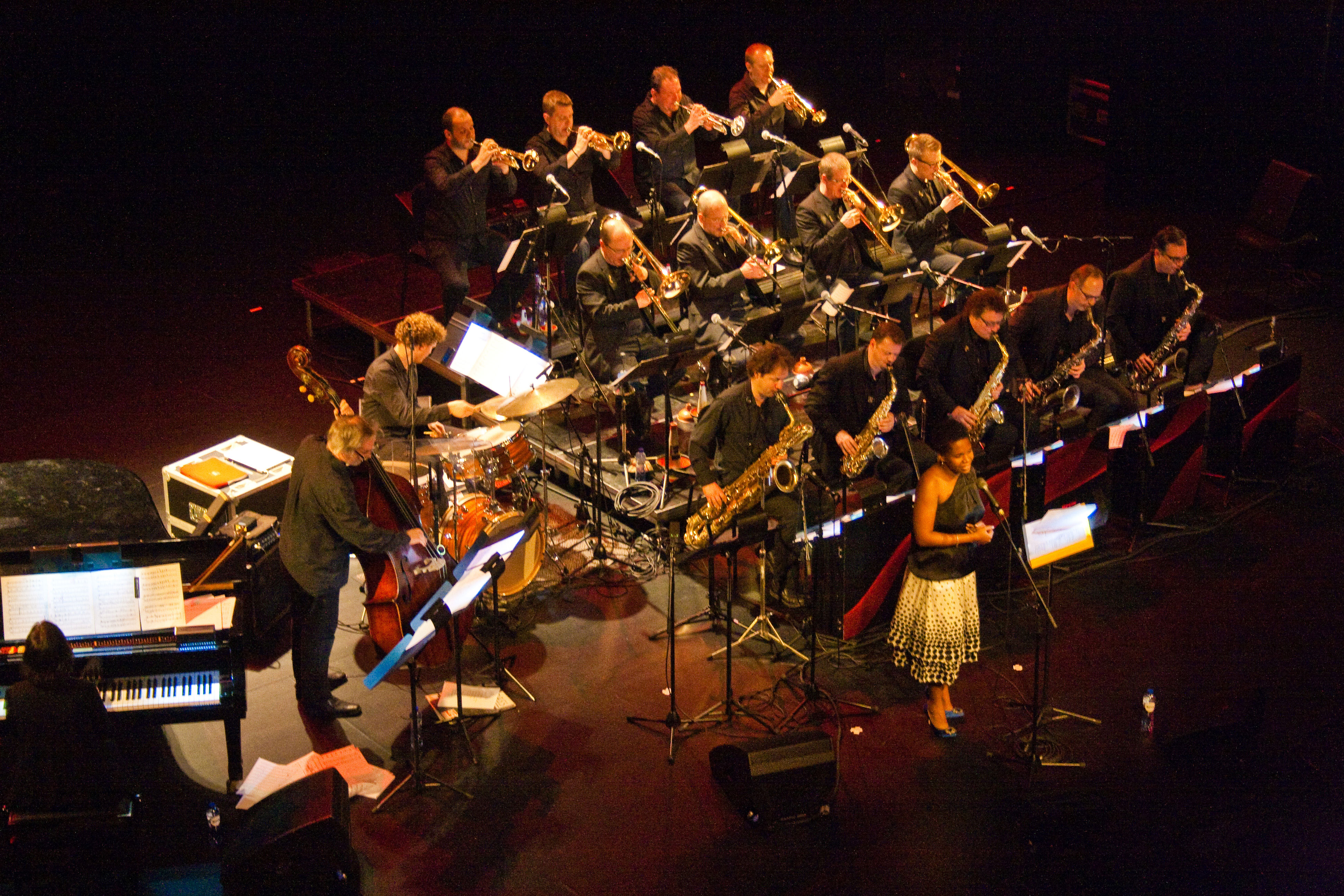
Concert 'New York, City of Jazz' by the Brussels Jazz Orchestra with Tutu Puoane, at Heist-op-den-Berg in 2014

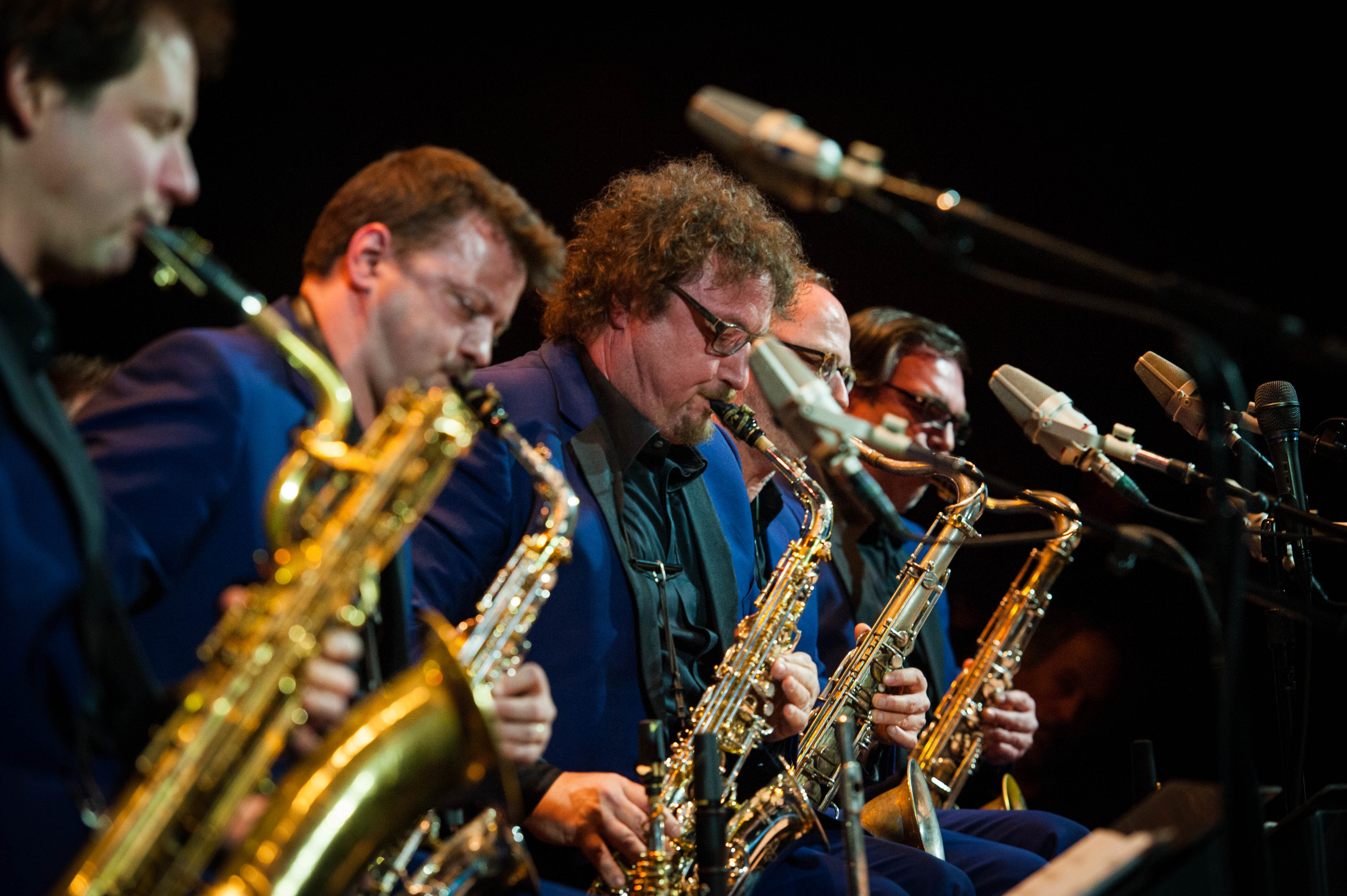
BJO in Jazz at Lincoln Center, New York March 2015

Brussels Jazz Orchestra is a Belgian jazz orchestra with big band line up founded in 1993 by saxophonist and composer Frank Vaganée, Serge Plume, Marc Godfroid and Bo van der Werf. Since 1999, the orchestra has been supported by the Flemish government.

Since then, it has established a reputation both at home and on relevant jazz stages abroad: Jazz Middelheim (Antwerp, Belgium), Jazz at Lincoln Center (New York, U.S.), Concertgebouw Amsterdam (Netherlands), Jazz à Vienne (France), Paris Jazz Festival (France) and many others.

BJO has performed with Philip Catherine, Bert Joris, Royal Flemish Philharmonic, Tutu Puoane, Brussels Philharmonic, David Linx and Richard Galliano in its own productions. BJO invited Joe Lovano (US), Maria Schneider (US), Kenny Werner (US), Dave Liebman (US), Dave Douglas (US), Gianluigi Trovesi (IT), McCoy Tyner (US), Maria João (PT), Kenny Wheeler (GB), Lee Konitz (US), Toots Thielemans, Enrico Pieranunzi (I) and others.

== Awards and honors ==
- Best Traditional Jazz Album, South African Music Award, Mama Africa, 2011
- Zilveren Griffel (NL) for audiobook Vliegen tot de hemel, 2011. BJO composed and performed the original soundtrack
- Golden Globe, BAFTA, César, and Academy Award for soundtrack The Artist, 2011–2012
- Grammy Award nomination, Best Large Jazz Ensemble Album, Wild Beauty, 2013
- Edison Jazz/World Award, best "Vocal Jazz" album for BREL, 2017

== Members ==
- Trumpets: Serge Plume, Nico Schepers, Pierre Drevet, Jeroen Van Malderen
- Trombones: Marc Godfroid, Lode Mertens, Ben Fleerakkers, Frederik Heirman, Laurent Hendrick
- Saxophones: Frank Vaganée, Dieter Limbourg, Kurt Van Herck, Bart Defoort, Bo Van Der Werf
- Acoustic bass: Bart De Nolf
- Piano: Nathalie Loriers
- Drums: Toni Vitacolonna

== Discography ==
- Live (1997)
- The September Sessions (1999)
- The Music of Bert Joris (2002)
- Kenny Werner Plays His Music With The Brussels Jazz Orchestra (2003)
- Meeting Colours - with Philip Catherine (2005)
- Countermove (2006)
- Dangerous Liaison - Bert Joris with deFilharmonie (2006)
- Changing Faces - with David Linx (Oct. 2007)
- The Music of Michel Herr (Feb. 2008)
- JazzOlympics (2 tracks, including 1 with David Linx/Michel Herr) (July 2008)
- Ten Years Ago - with Richard Galliano (2008)
- Mama Africa - with Tutu Puoane (2010)
- Signs and Signatures - with Bert Joris (2010)
- Guided Dream - with Dave Liebman (2011)
- A Different Porgy & Another Bess - with David Linx and Maria João (2012)
- BJO's Finest - Live! (2013)
- Wild Beauty - with Joe Lovano (2013)
- The Music of Enrico Pieranunzi - with Enrico Pieranunzi (2015)
- BREL - with David Linx (2016)
- Two Small Bags, Ten Million Dreams - Artists #withRefugees - Frank Vaganée, Michael De Cock with I Solisti del Vento, Brussels Vocal Project, David Linx, Tutu Puoane, Brussels Jazz Orchestra (2016)
- Smooth Shake with Bert Joris (2016)
- We Have A Dream - with Tutu Puoane (2018)
