= Tutu Puoane =

South African Jazz singer (born 1979)

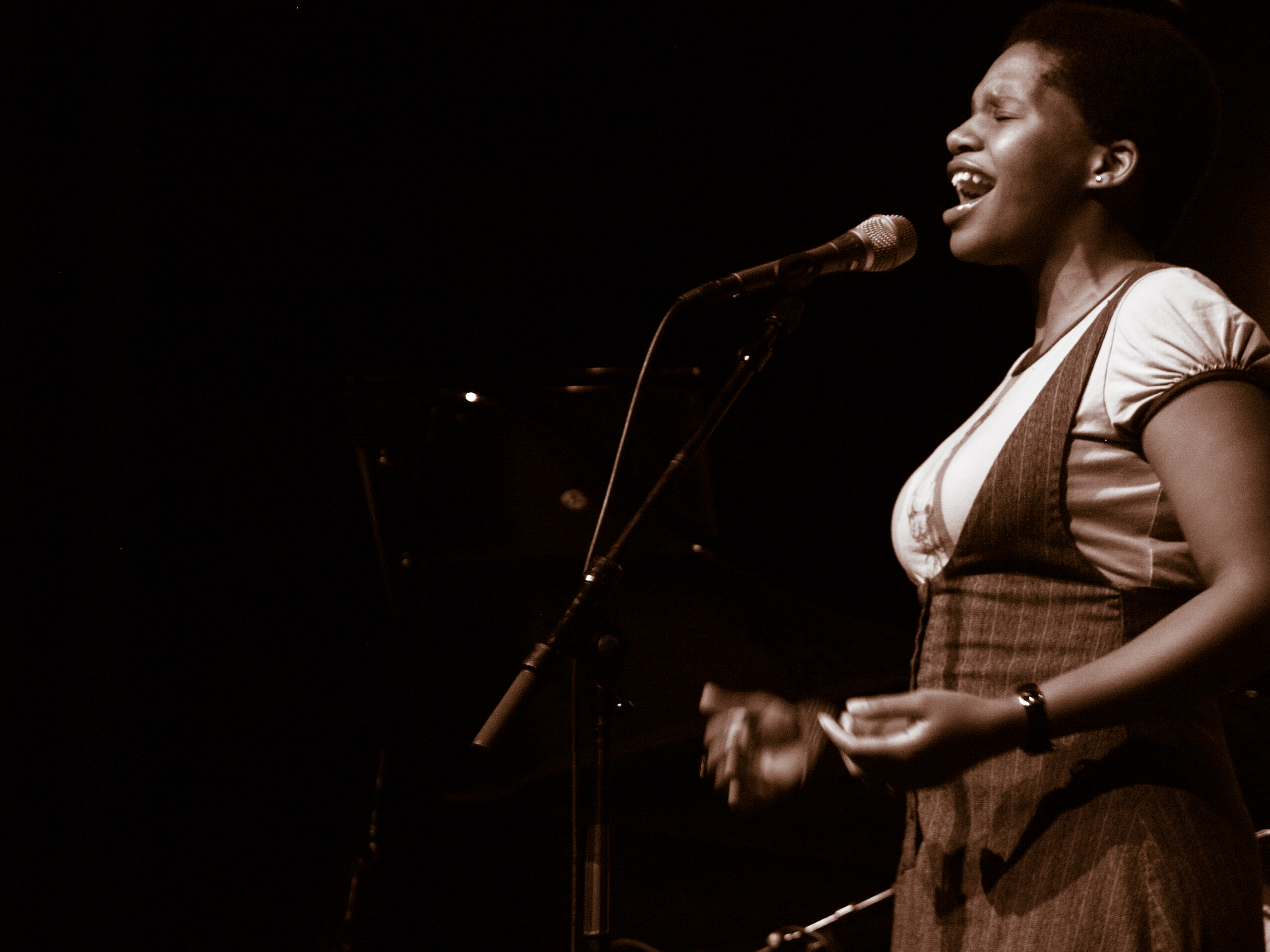
- Tutu Peoane (2008)

Background information
- Born: 31 May 1979 (age 45); Atteridgeville, Pretoria
- Genres: Jazz
- Occupation: Singer
- Instrument: Vocals

Tutu Puoane (31 May 1979, Atteridgeville, Pretoria-) is a South African Jazz singer. She grew up in the township of Mamelodi, Pretoria. By 1997 she had already been performing in Johannesburg downtown. Realizing her passion for singing, Tutu went on to study jazz vocals at the University of Cape Town with Jelena Reveshin and Virginia Davids. She received several awards from major South African jazz competitions. In 2000 she won the old mutual jazz encounters for Cape region and in 2001 she received a merit award for young promising talent at the Daimler Chrysler South African jazz competition.

When she completed her vocal studies at the music college of the University of Cape, a recording contract from a major South African music record label was already offered to her but she turned it down. She accepted a greater opportunity offered by Dutch pianist Jack van Poll – who was living and teaching in Cape Town at the time – to go and study in Europe and enhance her career as a jazz vocalist and a performer. In 2002 September, Tutu moved to Europe and stayed in The Netherlands studying further for almost two years at the royal conservatory of The Hague (Netherlands) with Rachel Gould. She then relocated to Antwerp in Belgium, her current home where she’s working steadily on her career. Tutu was the recipient of the standard bank young artist of the year award for music in 2004. She released two albums with her Europe band, first album called Song 2007 and second album called Quiet Now in 2009 which won the SAMA Award for the 2010 Best Traditional Jazz Album. Both albums were received very well internationally which led to Miss Puoane’s receiving an invite from the Brussels Jazz Orchestra to work with them. The musical journey between Tutu and Brussels Jazz Orchestra resulted in to a creation of an album titled Mama Africa celebrating the Music Icon Miriam Makeba; this album scored them a SAMA for Best Traditional Jazz Album of 2011. In 2019, she appeared on jazz composer Michel Herr's album "Positive". Tutu’s musical journey has landed all over the world in countries such as Italy, Germany, Belgium, The Netherlands, France, Luxemburg, Switzerland and USA.

== Discography ==
Song (2007) guest Tutu Puoane – Yellow Sounds & Other (2007) Quiet Now (2009) Tutu Puoane, Brussels Jazz Orchestra – Mama Africa (2010) Breathe (2012) Ilanga (2014) Bert Joris & Tutu Puoane, Royal Flemish Philharmonic – Live At De Roma (2014) Tutu Puoane, Brussels Jazz Orchestra – We Have A Dream (2018) Rebirth::Collective featuring Tutu Puoane – It Might As Well Swing (2021) Wrapped In Rhythm (Vol 1) (2024)

== Accolades ==
=== South African Music Awards ===
Year	Nominee / work	Award	Result
2009	Quiet Now	Best Traditional Album	Won
