= Nathalie Loriers =

Belgian jazz pianist and composer (born 1966)

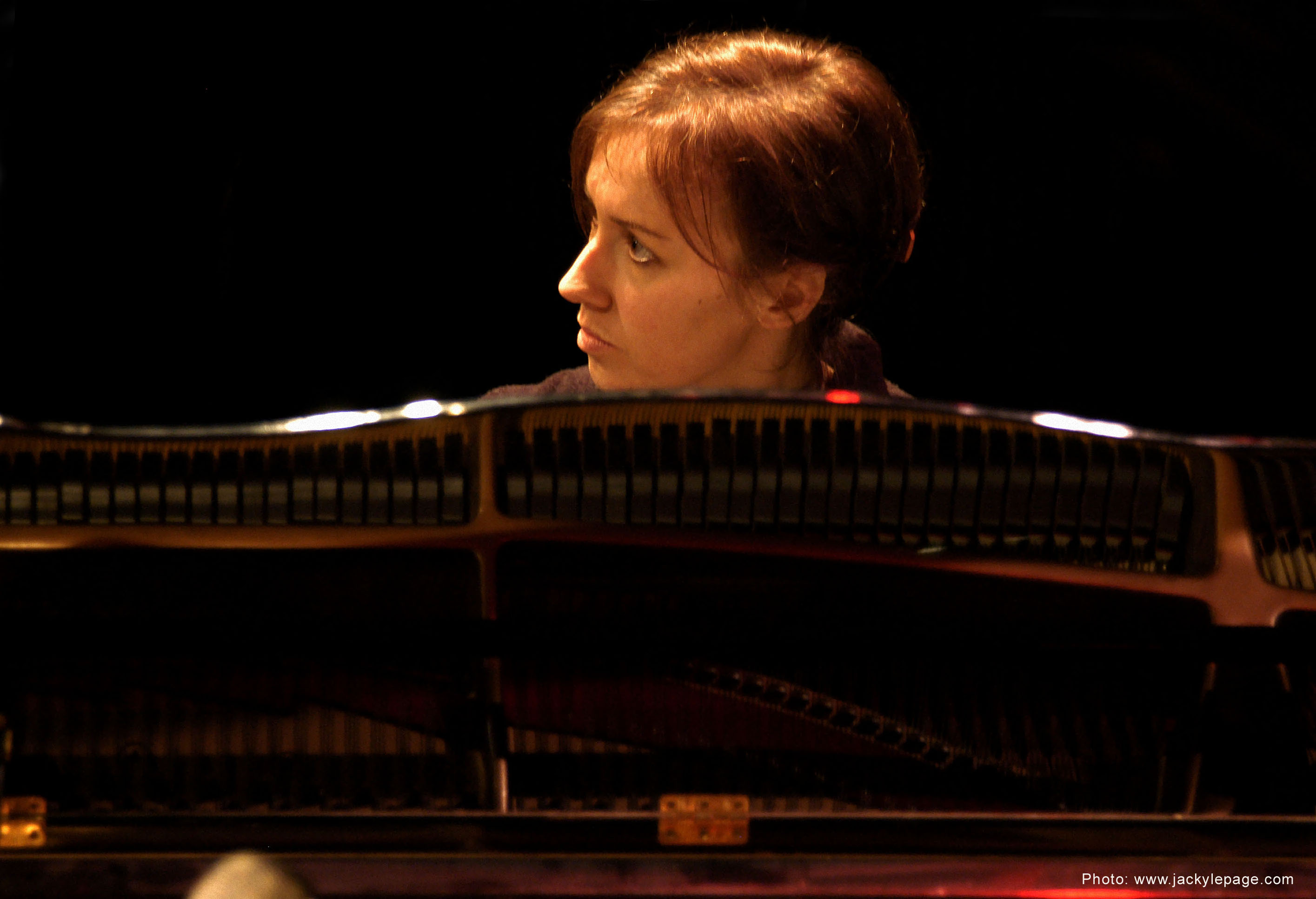

Background information
- Born: 27 October 1966 (age 59); Namur, Belgium
- Genres: Jazz
- Occupations: Musician, composer
- Instrument: Piano
- Years active: 1990–present
- Label: Igloo
- Website: www.nathalieloriers.com

Nathalie Loriers (born 27 October 1966, Namur) is a Belgian jazz pianist and composer.

== Music career ==
In 1991 Loriers formed her own quartet with Kurt Van Herck (saxophone), Philippe Aerts (double bass) and Mimi Verderame (drums). She also has her own trio with Salvatore La Rocca (double bass) and Hans van Oosterhout (drums). She won the 1999 Golden Django for best French-speaking artist.

She has worked with Philip Catherine, Toots Thielemans, Jeanfrançois Prins, Lee Konitz, Aldo Romano, Charlie Mariano, Christian Escoudé, David Linx, Diederik Wissels, Emanuele Cisi, Gianluigi Trovesi, Ivan Paduart, Jacques Pelzer, Laurent Blondiau, and Steve Houben.

== Awards and honors ==
- Sax Prize, Jazz Critics Association, 1989
- Belga Prize, Brussels Jazz Rally, Best Soloist, 1990
- First Prize, Jazz Contest, 1991
- Django d'Or, 1999
- EuroDjango Award, Contemporary European Jazz Artist, 2000
- Bobby Jaspar Prize, Académie du Jazz, 2000

== Discography ==
- Nymphéas (1991)
- Dance or Die (Igloo, 1993)
- Walking Through Walls, Walking Along Walls (Igloo, 1995)
- Silent Spring (1999)
- Tombouctou (2002)
- Le Temps Retrouvé (2021)
