= Mélanie De Biasio =

Belgian jazz singer, flutist and composer

Melanie De Biasio
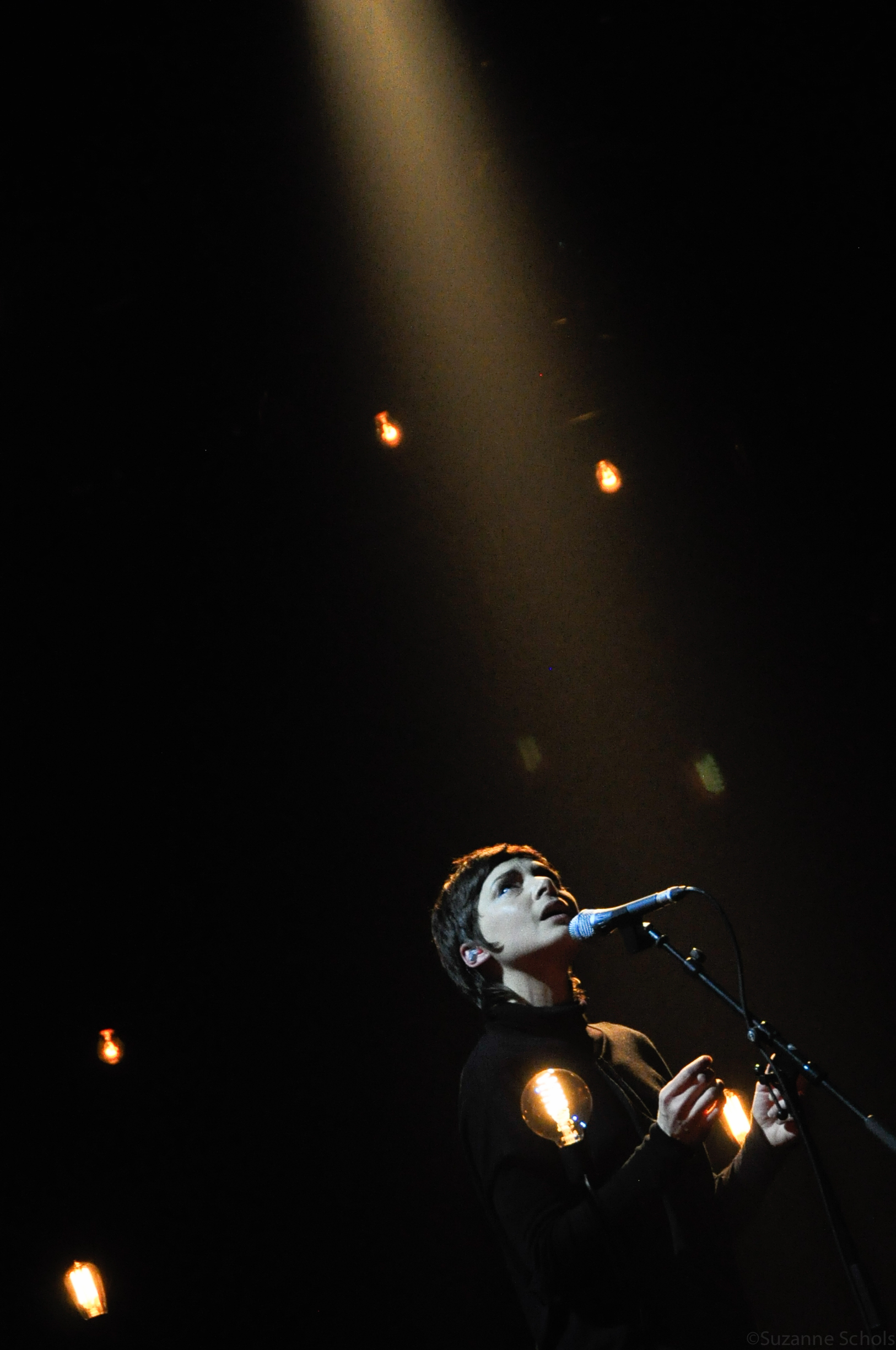
- Melanie De Biasio performing at the European Border Breakers Awards Show, Stadsschouwburg Groningen, Netherlands, 2015

Background information
- Born: 12 July 1978 (age 48); Charleroi, Belgium
- Genres: Jazz
- Occupation: Singer
- Labels: Igloo, PIAS
- Website: www.melaniedebiasio.net

Melanie De Biasio (born 12 July 1978) is a Belgian jazz singer, flutist and composer.

== Early life ==
De Biasio was born in Charleroi, to a Belgian mother and an Italian father. She learnt ballet from the age of three, and started playing the Western concert flute at eight. Being a fan of groups like Nirvana, Portishead, Pink Floyd and Jethro Tull, at the age of 15 she joined a rock band for a while. After three years of singing studies at the Royal Conservatory of Brussels, she was awarded a first prize with a degree of highest distinction. In 2004 during a tour in Russia, De Biasio suffered from a serious pulmonary infection which caused a loss of singing ability for a full year. During this time she developed her characteristic whispering chant.

== Career ==
Soon after she graduated, Belgian jazz musician and saxophone professor at her Conservatory Steve Houben asked her to appear in concert with him, allowing her to play in numerous festivals and other large music events in Belgium. In 2006, De Biasio was nominated for a Django d'Or award, in the "Young Talent" category. One year later, she released her first album, A Stomach Is Burning, on Igloo Records. It was favourably received by critics and it won the "Best Jazz Album" award at Les Octaves de la Musique.

In 2013 Melanie De Biasio signed a long term record deal with independent label [PIAS]. Soon thereafter she released her second album, No Deal, which has been described as a simple and sensual work. Rolling Stone gave it a 4-star review and JazzNews included in their Top 25 Best Albums Ever. Jamie Cullum recommended the album in his radio show and Radiohead's drummer Phil Selway chose it as his favourite album of 2014: "No Deal had me hooked from the first listen. It sounded like Billie Holiday had walked into the sessions for Mark Hollis's solo record. […] there is true soul in this record."

In 2014, Melanie De Biasio became the second Belgian artist to play on Later... with Jools Holland, after Zap Mama almost 20 years earlier. She supported Eels on their European tour. In 2015 a "No Deal" Remix album was released, created in collaboration with artists such as The Cinematic Orchestra, Eels & Gilles Peterson. That same year, De Biasio headlined the Montreux Jazz Tokyo Festival.

Melanie De Biasio was proclaimed to be the Best Live Act by Gilles Peterson and received his Track Of The Year award in 2016. In the same year she also won the European Border Breakers Award and the Champagne Price in France, along with the Octave De La Musique, D6BELS and Medaille Chevalier Wallon in Belgium. At the Haldern Pop Festival in 2016, she collaborated with Damien Rice, on a spectral cover of Nina Simone's 'Be My Husband'.

Also in 2016, Melanie De Biasio and her band recorded an exploratory version of a new track she had been working on. The take runs to almost 25 minutes and was released uncut on an EP, named Blackened Cities. The EP's cover artwork contains a black-and-white picture of Melanie De Biasio's home city Charleroi by photographer Stephan Vanfleteren.

In 2017 Melanie De Biasio released her third studio album, Lilies. It was reviewed very favourably and De Biasio once again received multiple awards, including best composer/author at the 2017 Music Industry Awards and D6BELS Awards. Shortly thereafter she played 3 sold-out concerts in a row at the Ancienne Belgique in Brussels. Melanie De Biasio then started a 2 year tour with concerts at festivals and venues all across the globe. While on tour, her track 'I Feel You – Eels Remix' was used to promote the film Alien: Covenant directed by Ridley Scott, it runs during the entire in-universe short movie "Meet Walter" starring Michael Fassbender.

In 2018, the President of Italy honoured Melanie De Biasio as Cavaliere Della Stella d'Italia.

== Community projects ==
Starting in 2011, De Biasio worked with prisoners for two years in a collective creative process using voice, movement, breath and rhythm, in collaboration with the non-profit organization Avanti that led to a critically acclaimed performance in the prison.

In 2017, in collaboration with a group of 10 patrons of the arts from Charleroi, Melanie De Biasio bought the house built in 1877 for Jules Audent, then mayor of the city. This building had long been occupied by the Italian consulate. After renovation works the site is now being used as an artist residence named, l'Alba - House of Shared Talents.

== Awards and honors ==
Awards

Year	Award
2001	Brussels Royal Conservatory of Jazz – 1st Prize with the highest distinction
2006	Django D'or Awards – Nominee 'Young Talent'
2008	Octaves de la Musique – Winner 'Best Jazz Album'
2013	Octave de la Musique – Winner 'Best Artist'
2014	Octave de la Musique – Winner 'Best Album'
2015	Gilles Peterson's Worldwide Awards – Winner 'Best Live Act'
2015	Gilles Peterson's Worldwide Awards – Nominee 'Best Album 2014'
2015	European Border Breakers Awards – Winner
2015	Champagne Price 2015 – Winner
2016	D6BELS Awards – Winner 'Musician Of The Year'
2016	D6BELS Awards – Winner 'Author & Compositor Of The Year'
2016	Gilles Peterson's Worldwide Awards – 'Track Of The Year'
2016	Music Industry Awards – Winner 'Best Artwork'
2017	D6BELS Awards – Winner 'Best Album'
2017	D6BELS Awards – Winner 'Best Music Video'
2017	D6BELS Awards – Winner 'Author & Compositor Of The Year'
2017	Music Industry Awards – Winner 'Author & Compositor Of The Year'

Honors

Year	Honor
2014	Medaille Chevalier Wallon
2019	Cavaliere Della Stella d'Italia

== Discography ==
=== Albums ===
List of albums, with selected chart positions
Year	Album	Peak positions		
Year	Album	BEL (Fl)	BEL (Wa)	FRA
2007	A Stomach Is Burning	144	113	—
2013	No Deal	14	5	55
2016	Blackened Cities (EP)	5	10	155
2017	Lilies	3	7	35
2023	Il viaggio	2	1	—

=== Singles ===
List of singles, with selected chart positions
Year	Title	Peak positions		
Year	Title	BEL (Fl)	BEL (Wa)	FRA
2013	"The Flow"	59	27	—
2017	"Your Freedom Is the End of Me"	97	—	90
2017	"Gold Junkies"	—	—	195
