= Frank Vaganée =

Belgian jazz saxophonist and composer (born 1966)

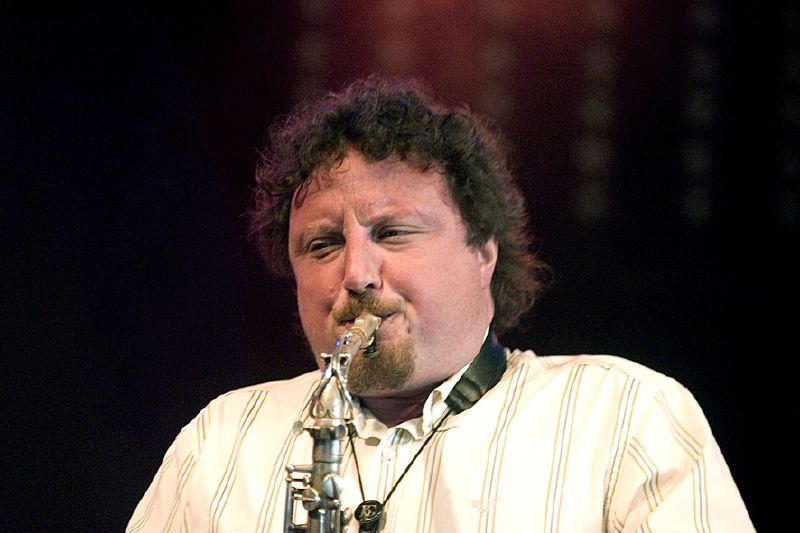
- Vaganée performing on 20 April 2008

Background information
- Born: 19 March 1966 (age 60); Mechelen, Belgium
- Genres: Jazz
- Occupations: Musician, composer
- Instrument: Saxophone
- Member of: Brussels Jazz Orchestra, Frank Vaganée/Mike Del Ferro Quartet

Frank Vaganée (born 19 March 1966, in Mechelen) is a Belgian jazz saxophonist and composer. He has his own trio with Philippe Aerts recently replaced by Rosario Bonnacorso on the double bass, and Dré Pallemaerts on drums. He is co-leader of the Frank Vaganée/Mike Del Ferro Quartet and also is the artistic leader of the Brussels Jazz Orchestra. He won the Belgian Golden Django award for best artist in 2001.
