= Anne Wolf =

- Born: May 31, 1967 (age 57); Brussels, Belgium
- Genres: Jazz, pop
- Occupation: Musician
- Instrument: Pianist

Anne Wolf (born 31 May 1967) is a Belgian jazz pianist. She studied classical piano for ten years before entering the conservatory in 1985, where she was taught by Michel Petrucciani, Eric Legnini, and Charles Loos.

She plays as well alone as with jazz, pop, and world musicians. In 2001, she released her first trio album. She won the Golden Django for best new talent in 2002 (although she had already appeared on several recordings).

Wolf has recorded with Sttellla, Frédéric Ruymen, Citizen Jane, Kendigo, Manu Hermia, Ben N'Gabo, Cheiro de Choro, and The Big Day.
