= Pascal Schumacher =

Luxembourgish jazz musician and composer

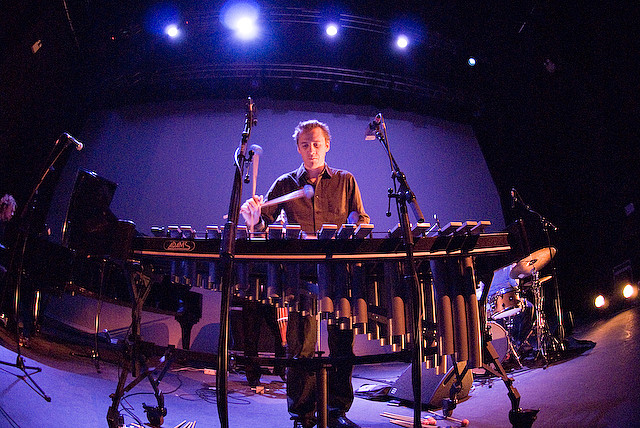
Pascal Schumacher, Dublin (2008)

Pascal Schumacher (born 12 March 1979 in Luxemburg) is a Luxembourgish jazz musician, composer and percussionist who has founded a number of groups including the Pascal Schumacher Quartet. He also plays and composes classical chamber music.

== Education ==
Pascal Schumacher studied classical percussion at the Luxembourg Conservatory. He continued his studies at the Strasbourg Conservatory and at the jazz department of the Royal Conservatory of Brussels. He obtained master's degrees in jazz-vibraphone at the Royal Conservatory of The Hague with Frits Landesbergen and in musicology at the Marc Bloch University in Strasbourg. Among those who assisted him in his studies were Gary Burton, David Friedman, Stefon Harris and Charles Loos.

== Career ==
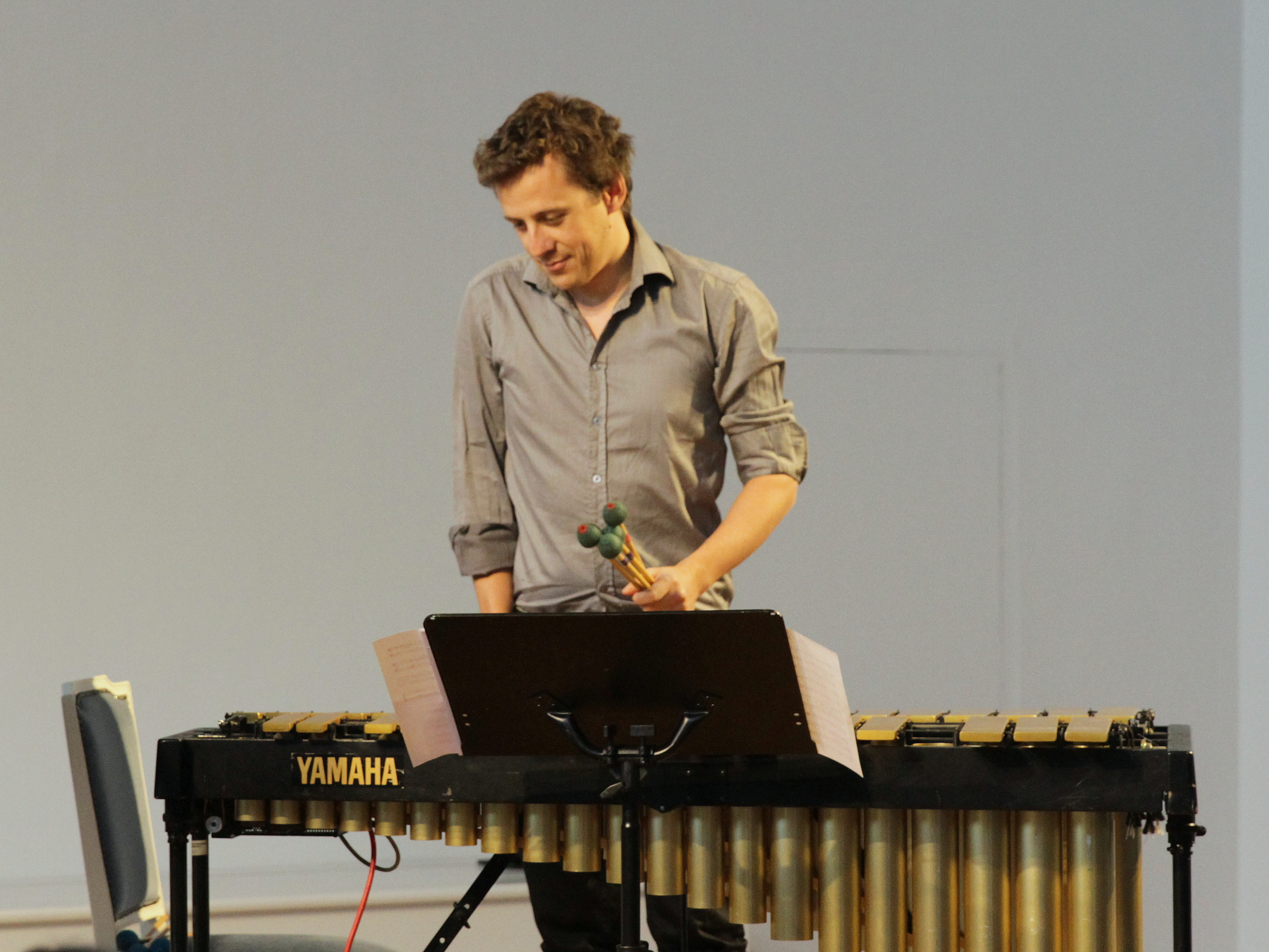
Pascal Schumacher at Tonspuren Irsee 2014, Germany

Schumacher cofounded the "Interchange" ensemble with saxophonist Nadine Kauffmann (1995) and, in 2001, the experimental percussion group "Stroke X". From 1997, he became increasingly involved in improvised music, especially jazz, playing with a number of different bands and performing with a variety of artists. In 2002, he set up his own Pascal Schumacher Quartet with Jef Neve (piano), Christophe Devisscher (bass) and Teun Verbruggen (drums). Their first album, Change Of The Moon was released in March 2004, providing the band with opportunities to travel across Europe as well as to Australia and South Africa. Their second album, Personal Legend was released in 2005 and their third, Silbergrau in 2007. In a preview of the quartet's contribution to the London Jazz Festival in November 2010, Thomas Gray characterized Schumacher (vibes) and Franz von Chossy (piano) as "resourceful improvisers, with an abundance of lucid ideas effortlessly articulated over the many shifts of metre. Meanwhile," he comments, "Christophe Devisscher (on bass) and Jens Düppe (on drums) play with a mix of muscle, precision and exquisite dynamic sensitivity."

With his quartet, Schumacher has performed at a number of jazz festivals including the North Sea Jazz Festival (Rotterdam), London Jazz Festival, Wangaratta Festival of Jazz, Copenhagen Jazz Festival and JVC Jazz Festival (Paris). They have also performed at clubs and festivals in Tokyo, Beijing, Shanghai, New York, Paris, Berlin, London, Munich, Liverpool Manchester, Athens, Warsaw, Melbourne, Sydney, Montreal, Toronto, Cape Town, Saigon and Mexico City.

Pascal played as soloist with Zürcher Kammerorchester, WDR Rundfunkorchester Köln, la Camerata Megaron Athens, l’Orchestre Philharmonique du Luxembourg, l’Orchestre de Chambre du Luxembourg, United Instruments of Lucilin, the Kammerorchester Berlin, the Neue Philharmonie Frankfurt and the Junge Norddeutsche Philharmonie.

In 2004, Jef Neve and Pascal Schumacher set up a duo (vibraphone and piano) playing a new kind of chamber music combining the sounds of Claude Debussy, Steve Reich and Igor Stravinsky. The duo has been warmly welcomed by the Philharmonie Luxembourg for the "Rising Stars" concert series in some of the largest concert halls in Europe in association with the European Concert Hall Organisation.

Pascal Schumacher also teaches at the Luxembourg Conservatory.

== Awards ==
- IKB Jugend-Förderpreis (1998)
- Prix Norbert Stelmes des Jeunesses Musicales Luxembourg (1999)
- Together with the Pascal Schumacher Quartet, First Prize and Public Prize, Tremplin Jazz Avignon (2004)
- Django d'Or for New Talent, Belgian Jazz Trophy (2005)
- Pascal Schumacher has been selected for the 2009-2010 Rising Stars program organized by the European Concert Hall Organization (2008)
- ECHO Jazz, "Instrumentalist of the year International, special instruments, Vibraphone", Germany (2012)
- Pascal Schumacher wins the Export Artist 2012 award by the Luxembourgish music export office Music:Lx.
- Pascal Schumacher wins the JTI Eurocore Jazz Award 2013.
- Pascal Schumacher wins together with Danae Dörken the OPUS KLASSIK Award in 2025.

== Discography (selection) ==
- Change of the Moon, (Igloo, 2004)
- Personal Legend, (Igloo, 2006)
- Silbergrau, (Igloo, 2007)
- Here We Gong, (Enja, (2009)
- Face to Face, (Enja, 2010)
- Bang My Can, (Enja, 2011)
- Left Tokyo Right, (Laborie, 2015)
- Afrodiziak, (MNP/MPS/Naxos, 2016)
- The Woman One Longs For starring Marlene Dietrich, Friedrich-Wilhelm-Murnau-Foundation, Wiesbaden (1929/2012) DVD
- Double Quartet - Henning Siewerts (Pirouet, 2016)
- ÜberBach - Arash Safaian (Neue Meister, Edel, 2016)
- Drops & Points (Modulating Music 2017)
- Drops & Points Reworks (Modulating Music 2018)
- SOL (Neue Meister, Edel 2020)
- SOL - The Mudam Session (Neue Meister, Edel 2020)
- LUNA with Echo Collective (Neue Meister, Edel 2022)
- CTRL Variations with United Instruments of Lucilin (Neue Meister, Edel 2023)
- GLASS ONE (Neue Meister, Edel 2024)
- GLASS TWO with Danae Dörken (Neue Meister, Edel 2024)
- SINGÜLAR with Edward Perraud and Sebastian Studnitzky (XJAZZ, 2025)
