= Teus Nobel =

Dutch jazz trumpeter

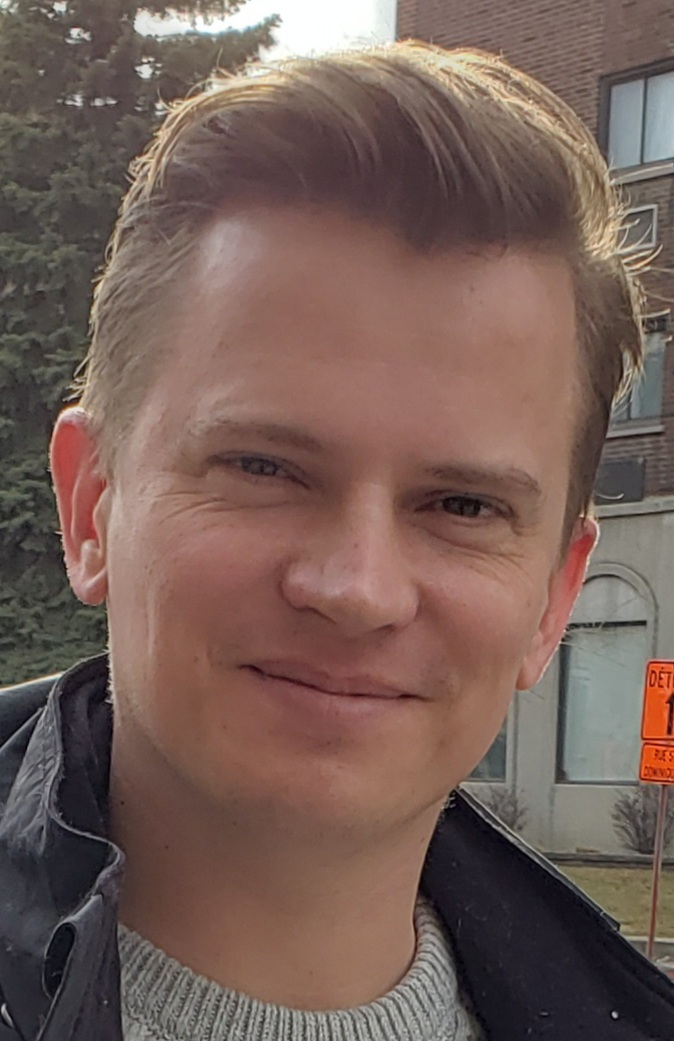
Teus Nobel

Teus Nobel is a Dutch jazz trumpet player and flugelhorn player. He performs with different bands and is a teacher at Fontys Hogeschool. In 2020 he won an Edison Award for the album Saudade.

== Biography ==
Teus Nobel studied classical music and jazz at the Codarts University for the Arts in Rotterdam. Here he obtained a bachelor's (2006) and a master's degree, with a research project on the intellectual legacy of jazz trumpeter Woody Shaw.

He has played and toured with the Rotterdam Ska Jazz Foundation, Caro Emerald, The Kyteman Orchestra and Frank McComb. With his own Liberty Group he performed at the North Sea Jazz Festival.

Nobel has released several albums, with Liberty Group and collaborated with Jef Neve and Roeland Jacobs/Radio Filharmonisch Orkest. With Jacobs he won an Edison Award in 2020 for their Saudade album.

He has been a teacher at Fontys Academy of Music & Performing Arts since 2020.

== Discography ==
- Flow (2012)
- Legacy (2014)
- Social Music (with Merlijn Verboom) (2016)
- Journey of Man (2019)
- Pleasure Is the Measure (2021)
- Human First (2023)
- Child's Play (2026)

With Jef Neve

- Spirit Control (2017)
- Mysterium (2020)

With Roeland Jacobs

- Saudade (2019) - Edison Jazz/World 2020
- Tanto Amor (2021)
