= Kel Assouf =

Music group from Niger and Belgium

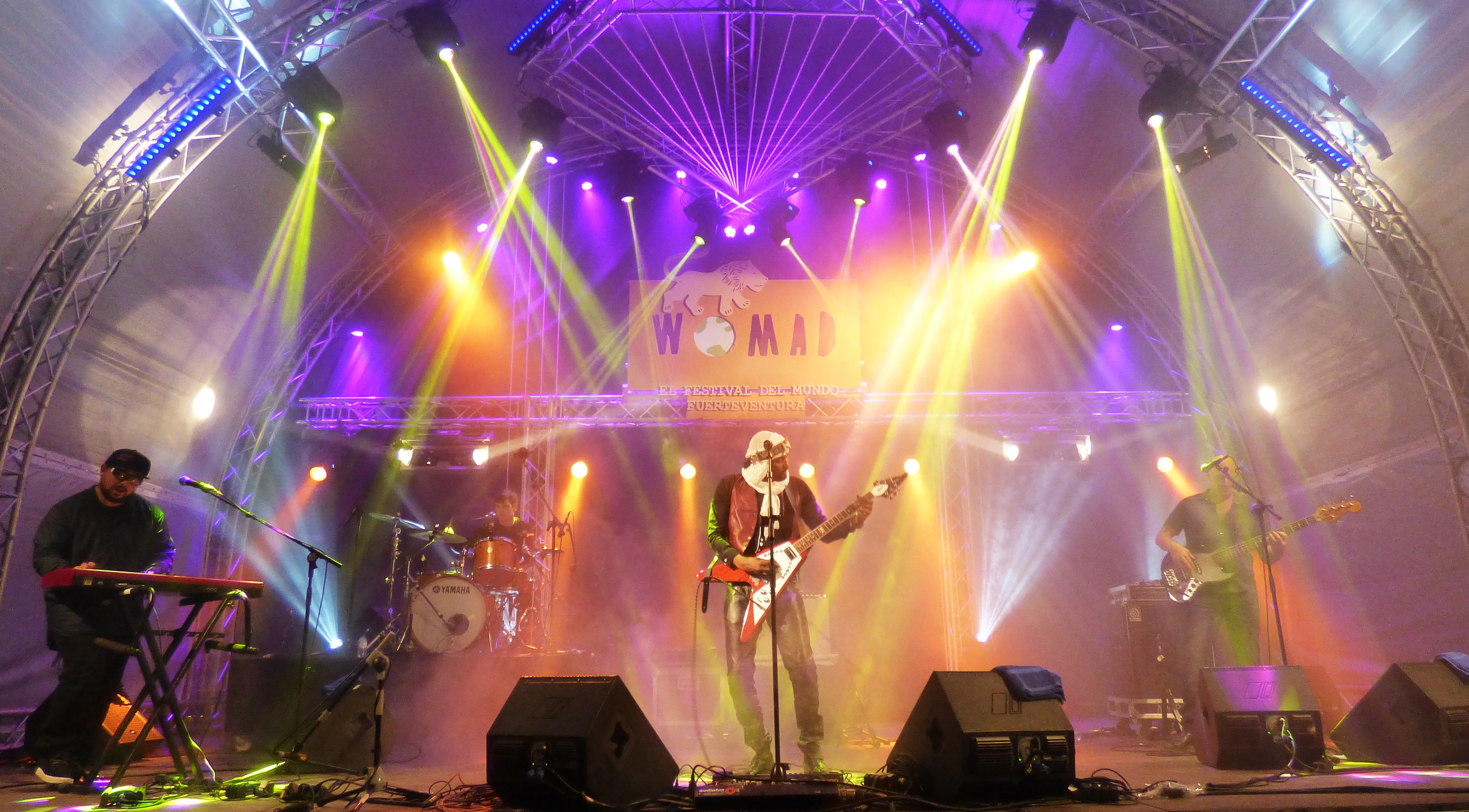
- Kel Assouf at the WOMAD, Fuerteventura, Canarias, Spain, (2016).

Background information
- Origin: Niger, Belgium
- Genres: Rock, blues, blues-rock, tishoumaren, berber music
- Years active: 2006–present
- Labels: Igloo, Glitterbeat
- Members: Anana Harouna; Olivier Penu; Alan Van Rompuy; Guillaume Palomba
- Past members: Aboubacar Harouna; Abdelwahab Hakem; Mama Wallet Amoumine; Olivier Crespel; Youba Dia; Esinam Dogbaste
- Website: www.kelassouf.com

Kel Assouf is a Tuareg musical group making "Tuareg rock" with electronic influences. The band's singer, songwriter, and guitarist is Anana Harouna. Kel Assouf, in Tamasheq, means "nostalgia" and "son of eternity".

== Career ==
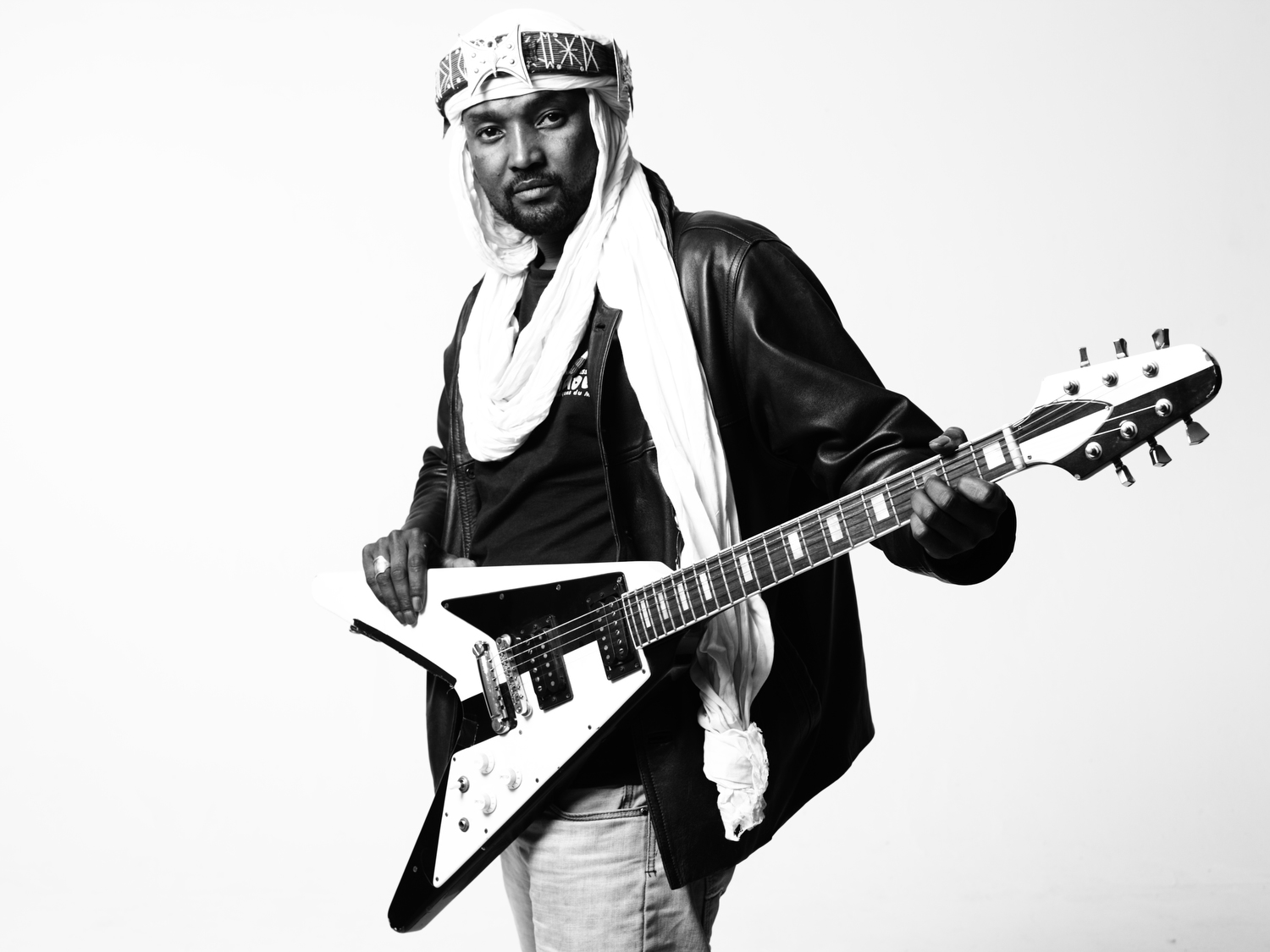
The member Anana Harouna.

Anana Harouna was born in Niger and lived in Libya during the Tuareg rebellion of the early 1990s, like the band members of Tinariwen, with whom he has performed. He formed Kel Assouf while arriving in Brussels in 2006. Oliver Penu, who plays drums on the third album, Black Tenere (2019), is Belgian, and Sofyann Ben Youssef is a Tunisian who produced the albums Tikounen (2016) and Black Tenere; he also plays keyboards to add bass lines, and occasionally plays frame drum in live performances.

Their third album, Black Tenere, released in 2019 employs drum lines from the Roland TR-808 and heavy guitar riffs. Robin Denselow, writing in The Guardian, gave Black Tenere four out of five stars, describing the music as "how the music of the Sahara sounds once it has migrated to Europe and fused with other influences".

== Discography ==
- 2010: Tin Hinane (Igloo Records)
- 2016: Tikounen (Igloo Records/SOWAREX)
- 2019: Black Tenere (Glitterbeat Records)
