= Lilies (Melanie De Biasio album) =

Studio album by Melanie De Biasio
- Released: 6 October 2017
- Length: 38:33
- Label: PIAS

Melanie De Biasio chronology
Blackened Cities (2016)	Lilies (2017)

Professional ratings
Aggregate scores
Source	Rating
Metacritic	81/100
Review scores
Source	Rating
AllMusic	4/5 stars
Exclaim!	7/10

Lilies is the third studio album by Belgium musician Melanie De Biasio. It was released on 6 October 2017 through PIAS Recordings.

== Track listing ==
No.	Title	Length
1.	"Your Freedom Is the End of Me"	3:51
2.	"Gold Junkies"	3:19
3.	"Lilies"	4:02
4.	"Let Me Love You"	4:08
5.	"Sitting in the Stairwell"	2:49
6.	"Brother"	3:11
7.	"Afro Blue"	4:33
8.	"All My Worlds"	6:40
9.	"And My Heart Goes On"	6:00

== Charts ==
=== Weekly charts ===
Chart (2017)	Peak position
Belgian Albums (Ultratop Flanders)	3
Belgian Albums (Ultratop Wallonia)	7
Dutch Albums (Album Top 100)	89
French Albums (SNEP)	35
Swiss Albums (Schweizer Hitparade)	65

=== Year-end charts ===
Chart (2017)	Position
Belgian Albums (Ultratop Flanders)	39
Belgian Albums (Ultratop Wallonia)	64

Chart (2018)	Position
Belgian Albums (Ultratop Flanders)	84
Belgian Albums (Ultratop Wallonia)	154
