= Boyan Vodenitcharov =

Bulgarian pianist and composer (born 1960)

Boyan Vodenitcharov (Bulgarian: Боян Воденичаров; born 1960) is a Bulgarian pianist and composer.

While a student in Sofia's State Conservatory (where he was later a teacher) he won the 1982 National Composition Competition, and was awarded 3rd prizes in the XXXIII Concorso Busoni and the X Queen Elisabeth competition. After finishing his studies he began an international concert career.

In 1991 Vodenitcharov settled in Belgium. He is a teacher at Brussels' Koninklijk Conservatorium.

In addition to classical works, he has released two albums with Belgian saxophone player Steve Houben that mix classical music and jazz: Les Valses (2003 on the Mogno label) and Darker Scales (2011 on Igloo Records).
