= Manu Louis =

Belgian musician

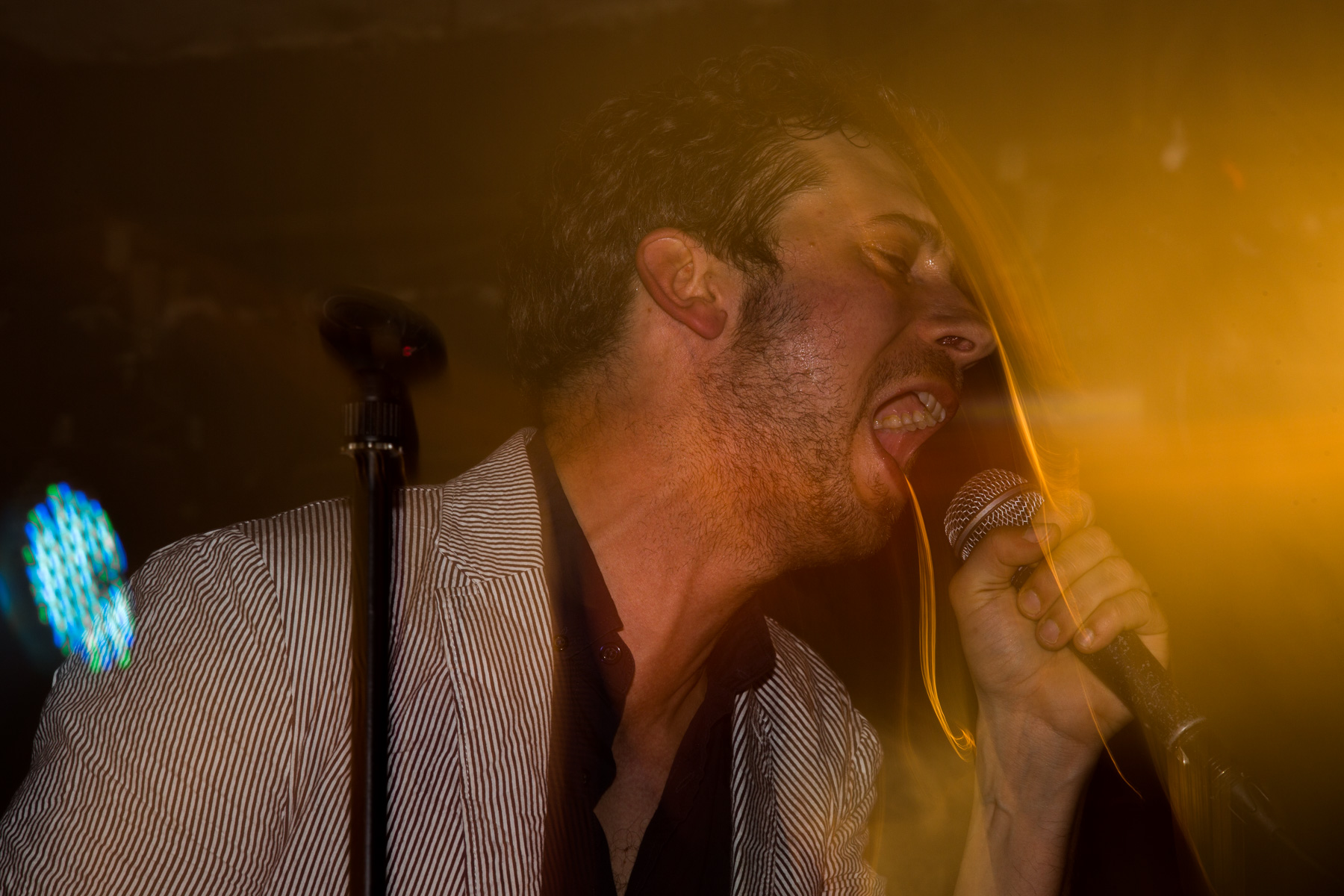
- Manu Louis at Amaze Festival, Berlin

Background information
- Genres: Experimental Pop; electronic; chamber
- Occupations: Singer, musician, composer
- Labels: Igloo, New Pangea, Moorworks
- Website: louislouis.org

Manu Louis is a Belgian musician, singer-songwriter, and composer, influenced equally by pop, jazz, 8-bit electronica, and 20th-century classical music.

== Career ==
In 2017 he released his debut album, Kermesse Machine, on Igloo Records. The album is a mix of found sounds, instrumentation, and vocal samples that are influenced by pop, classical, experimental music and jazz. The album artwork was made by Welsh photographer Jason Evans.

The tour following the release saw Louis performing solo more than 150 times in 22 different European countries, as well as China and Japan,.

== Studies ==
Louis studied composition at the Royal Conservatory of Liège with American composer Frederic Rzewski

== Discography ==
=== LP ===
- Club Copy – Igloo Records (2023)
- Cream Parade – Igloo Records (2019)
- Kermesse Machine – Igloo Records (2017)

=== Single ===
- Cream Parade Remixes (12" maxi) – Le Pacifique Records/Igloo Records (2020)
- Coltan Major Harmonics (7") – Igloo Circle (2019)
- Tchouang Tseu (7") – New Pangea (2015)
