= Jazz Center Flanders =

- Jazz Centrum Vlaanderen
- Location within Belgium
- Established: 2001
- Location: Dendermonde
- Coordinates: 51°1′36.5″N 4°6′14.889″E
- Type: museum, and documentation and information center
- Website: www.jazzcentrumvlaanderen.be

The Jazz Center Flanders (Dutch: Jazz Centrum Vlaanderen) is a documentation and information center in Dendermonde in East Flanders, Belgium. It is dedicated to archiving, documenting and researching audio and visual recordings of traditional jazz and blues music.

In addition it maintains a museum, with guided tours, thematic exhibitions, video presentations and workshops. It is aiming to promote jazz and blues by organizing concerts and lectures, and releasing publications and news letters.

The collection gives insight in the development of jazz and blues since the early years in the United States, and the adaptation and development of these styles since the 1950s in Flanders (see Jazz in Belgium). The center has the possession of some rare material, like photo and video recordings at festivals, concerts and in clubs. The archive can be consulted by the public.

The center is located near the Honky Tonk Jazz Club, which was established in 1965.

== See also ==
- List of museums in Belgium
- List of music museums
