= Jef Neve =

Belgian pianist and composer

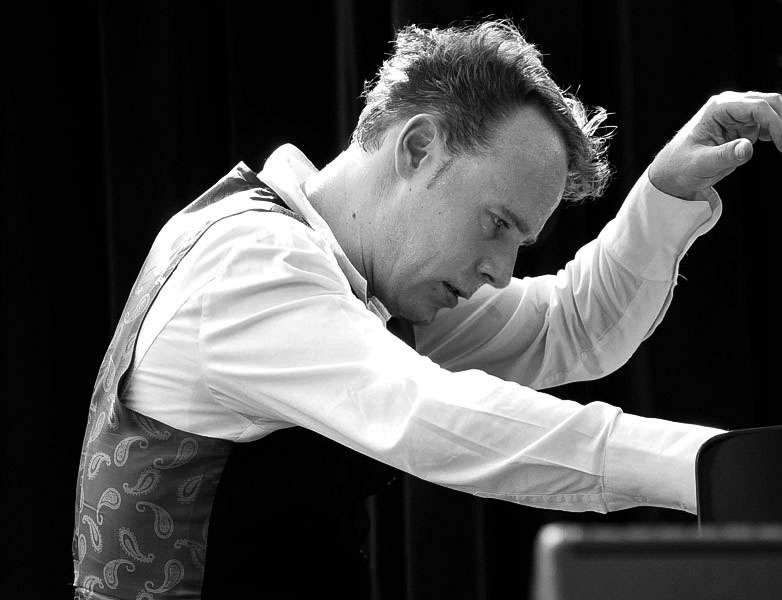
- At Aarhus Jazz Festival 2012

Background information
- Born: 8 March 1977 (age 49); Turnhout, Belgium
- Genres: Jazz, classical
- Occupations: Musician, composer
- Instrument: Piano
- Years active: Early 2000s–present
- Website: jefneve.com

Jef Neve (born 8 March 1977) is a Belgian jazz and classical music pianist and composer.

== Life and career ==
Neve was born in Turnhout, Belgium. By the age of 14 he was composing music and playing in bands. He studied jazz and classical music at the Lemmensinstituut in Leuven and graduated in 2000. Not much later, he worked as a piano teacher and took the then 12-year-old Seppe Gebruers under his wing.

Neve wrote the soundtrack for Felix Van Groeningen's Dagen Zonder Lief. He also composed for the VRT series In Vlaamse Velden (In Flanders Fields). The pianist played on Ludovic Bource's soundtrack for The Artist.

The Guardian's reviewer of Neve's 2008 release Soul in a Picture commented that the pianist's playing contained "a very personal language, one which draws freely on classical music and – aided and abetted by Piet Verbist (bass) and Teun Verbruggen (drums) – has the impetus of jazz and rock". Neve appeared on José James' 2010 album For All We Know.

== Discography ==
An asterisk (*) indicates that the year is that of release.

=== As leader/co-leader ===
Year recorded	Title	Label	Personnel/Notes
2002–03	Blue Saga	Contour	With Piet Verbist (bass), Lieven Venken and Teun Verbruggen (drums); Peter Kindt and Kristof Lefebre (trombone); Koen Mertens (drums on one track)
2004*	It's Gone	Contour	With Piet Verbist (bass), Teun Verbruggen (drums), Bert Joris (trumpet), Frederic Heirman (trombone), Peter Kindt (bass trombone), Berlinde Deman (bass tuba)
2006	Nobody Is Illegal	EmArcy	Trio, with Piet Verbist (bass), Teun Verbruggen (drums)
2008*	Soul in a Picture	EmArcy	Trio, with Piet Verbist (bass), Teun Verbruggen (drums)
2009*	Face to Face	Enja	With Pascal Schumacher
2010	Imaginary Road	EmArcy	Trio, with Ruben Samama (bass), Teun Verbruggen (drums)
2012*	Sons of the New World	Universal	With Myrddin de Cauter (clarinet, guitar), Michael Campagna (sax, flute), Jo Hermans (trumpet, flugelhorn), Pieter Kindt (trombone), Bart Indevuyst (horn), Sean Fasciani (bass), Teun Verbruggen (drums)
2013–14	One	EmArcy	Solo piano
2017	Spirit Control	Universal	With Sam Sparro (vocal), Teus Nobel (trumpet), Amber Docters van Leeuwen (cello)
2019	Sharing Life Stories	Universal	Solo piano
2020	Mysterium	Universal	With Jasper Høiby (double bass), Teus Nobel (trumpet), Nicolas Kummert (tenor sax), Bruno Van der Haegen (tenor sax), Andy Dhondt (tenor sax), Pieter Kindt (bass trombone)
2023	That Old Feeling	Universal	With various vocalists; Madeleine Peyroux, Sam Merrick, Trijntje Oosterhuis, Sam Sparro, Typhoon, Robin McKelle, Johnny Manuel, Monique Harcum.
2026	Key Energy	Blue Keys Productions	Solo piano

=== As sideman ===
Year recorded	Leader	Title	Label
2010*	José James	For All We Know	Impulse!/Verve
2010*	Gabriel Ríos	The Dangerous Return	PIAS
