= Éric Legnini =

Belgian jazz pianist (born 1970)

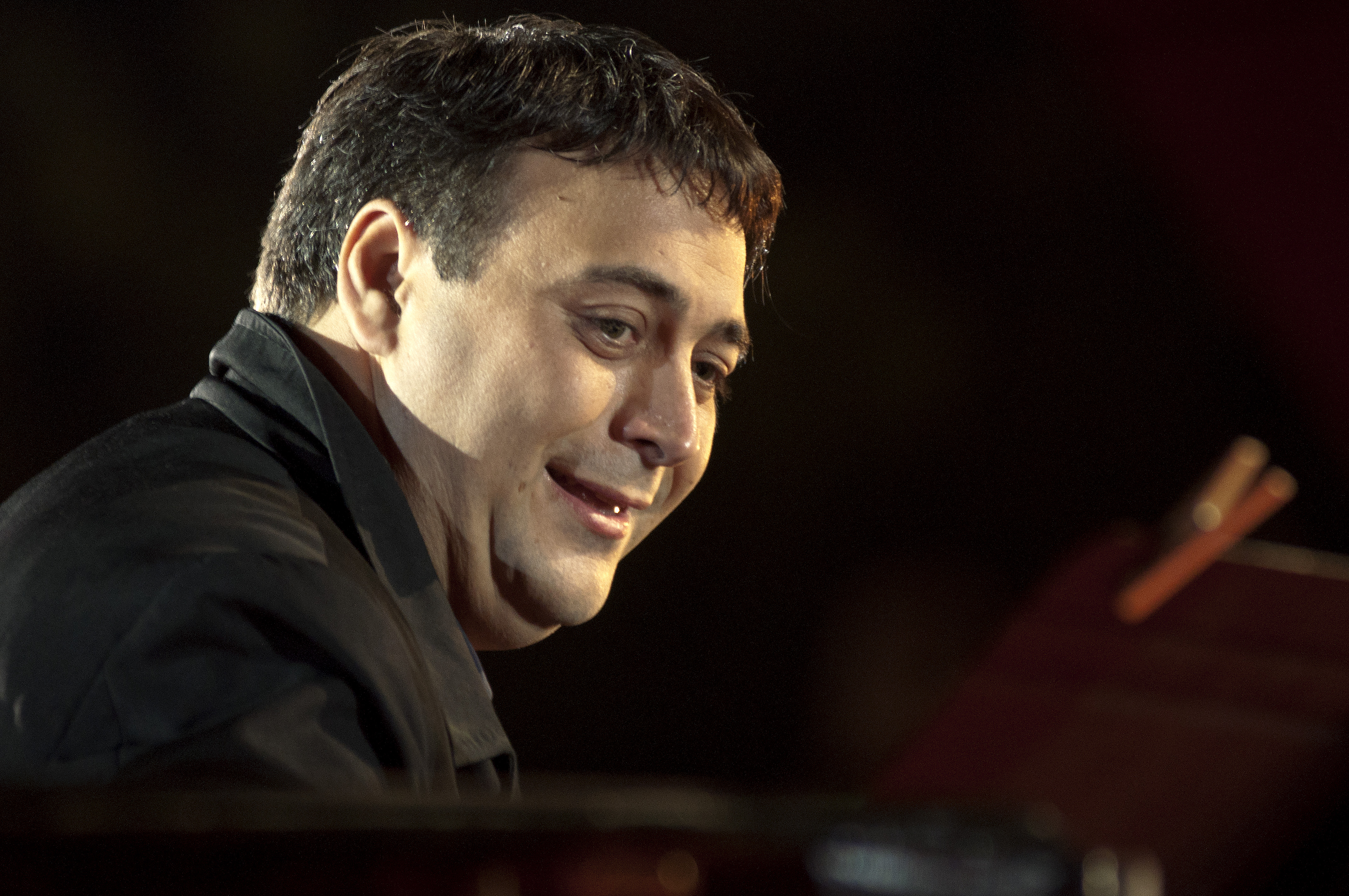

Background information
- Born: 20 February 1970 (age 56); Huy, Belgium
- Genres: Jazz
- Occupation: Musician
- Instrument: Piano
- Years active: 1980–present
- Labels: Label Bleu, Discograph, Igloo, Anteprima

Éric Legnini (born 20 February 1970 in Huy, near Liège, Belgium) is a Belgian jazz pianist and bandleader of the Éric Legnini Trio.

Legnini was born into an artistic family from Italy. The family immigrated to Belgium, where he started playing the piano at age 6 and initiated in jazz in his teens. In 1988 he traveled to the United States for two years to study American jazz. He returned as a teacher of jazz piano at the Brussels Royal Conservatory of Music, where he met Jacques Pelzer. The result was the Pelzer album Never Let Me Go with guest stars Barney Wilen and Michel Graillier.

He started to play piano in the Stefano di Battista Quartet. In the 1990s, he worked with Flavio Boltro (trumpet) and Stefano Di Battista (saxophone) forming the jazz ensemble Éric Legnini Trio that caught attention in the 1990s.

He has played with fellow artists like Aldo Romano, Belmondo Quintet, John Ruocco, Félix Simtaine, Jeanfrançois Prins, Michel Hatzigeorgiou, Dré Pallemaerts, Emanuele Cisi, Toninho Horta, Philip Catherine, Serge Reggiani, Hein van de Geyn, Marcia Maria, Jacques Pelzer, André Ceccarelli, Éric Le Lann, Paco Sery and others.

Legnini had great admiration for the works of Phineas Newborn, dedicating the piece The Memphis Dude to him. The track appears in his album Miss Soul.

Legnini won "Octave de la musique jazz" in 2006 and "Instrumental album of the year" during 2011 Victoires du jazz for his album The Vox.

== Discography ==
=== Albums ===
Éric Legnini Trio

- 1990: Essentiels (Igloo)
- 1990: Natural Balance
- 1993: Antraigues (P Jazz)
- 1995: Rhythm Sphere (Igloo)
- 2005: Miss Soul (Label Bleu)
- 2007: Big Boogaloo (Label Bleu)
- 2009: Trippin (B. Flat) (peaked in FRA at No. 103)
- 2012: Ballads (Discograph) (peaked in FRA No. 55)

Eric Legnini and the Afro Jazz Beat

- 2011: The Vox (Discograph) (peaked in FRA No. 113)
- 2013: Sing Twice! (Discograph) (peaked in FRA No. 139)
