= Django d'Or (jazz music award) =

The Golden Django, named after guitarist Django Reinhardt, is an award for jazz musicians in Europe created by the French producer Frank Hagège. The trophy is a creation of the French painter Raymond Moretti. It was first introduced in France (in 1992), then in Belgium (1995), in Sweden and Italy (1999) and finally in Denmark (2001).

== Belgian palmares ==
Since 1995, Belgium has had its own Golden Django ceremony, sponsored by SABAM. It was first proposed to reward both French-speaking and Flemish Belgian jazz musicians, but since 2000, only one musician receives the trophy, alternating French-speaking and Dutch-speaking winners each year. The next year, they introduced the new talent award. A special prize was also created. The ceremony was cancelled in 2008.

Year	French-speaking	Flemish	New talent	Special prize
1995	Philip Catherine (guitar)	Marc Godfroid (trombone)	–	–
1996	Sadi (vibraphone)	Bert Joris (trumpet)	–	–
1997	Charles Loos (piano)	Kurt Van Herck (saxophone)	–	–
1998	Fabrizio Cassol (saxophone)	Chris Joris (percussion)	–	Jean Warland (bass)
1999	Nathalie Loriers (piano)	Jeroen Van Herzeele (saxophone)	–	–
2000	Steve Houben (saxophone, flute)	–	–	Edmond Harnie (trumpet)
2001	–	Frank Vaganée (saxophone)	Nicolas Thys (bass)	Robert Pernet (jazz historian)
2002	Philippe Aerts (double bass)	–	Anne Wolf (piano)	Rik Bevernage (producer from De Werf)
2003	–	Erik Vermeulen (piano)	Nicolas Kummert (saxophone)	Jean-Marie Peterken (organizer of festivals)
2005	Eric Legnini (piano)	–	Pascal Schumacher (vibraphone)	Sim Simons (journalist)
2006	–	–	–	George Avakian (Record Producer and Manager)
2007	Pierre Van Dormael (guitar)	–	Pascal Mohy	Marc Van den Hoof
