= Michel Herr =

Belgian jazz pianist, composer and arranger

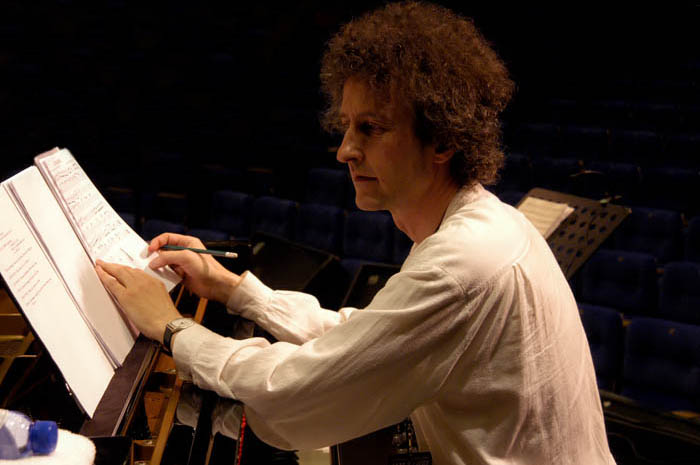

Background information
- Born: 16 February 1949 (age 76)
- Origin: Brussels, Belgium
- Instrument(s): Piano, keyboards, composer, arranger
- Years active: 1970–present
- Website: www.michelherr.com

Michel Herr (born 16 February 1949 in Brussels) is a Belgian jazz pianist, composer and arranger. In addition to releasing jazz albums, composing for jazz ensembles and touring widely as a performing musician, he has also composed scores for films. As a bandleader he founded several bands: Solis Lacus, Michel Herr European Quintet, Michel Herr & Unexpected Encounters. He is also a music producer.

In 2020 he was awarded the Prix Sabam for Culture – Compositeur de Jazz 2019 for his album Positive / Music for sextet and string quartet (Igloo Records, 2019).

== Selected works ==
=== Albums as a leader or co-leader ===
- Positive / Music for sextet and string quartet (2019)
- Jazz Olympics (1 track in tentet with Michel & Life Lines) (2008)
- The Music of Michel Herr (with the Brussels Jazz Orchestra) (2008)
- A tribute to Belgian Jazz (1998)
- Notes of life (1998) (Quintet)
- Just friends (Michel Herr & Archie Shepp)(1993) (movie soundtrack)
- Meet Curtis Lundy & Kenny Washington (Steve Houben & Michel Herr) (1983)
- Intuitions (1989) (trio)
- Short stories (1982) (with Wolfgang Engstfeld)
- Continuous flow (1980) (Engstfeld / Herr / Danielsson / Lowe)
- Good buddies (1979) (with Bill Frisell)
- Perspective (1978) (with Wolfgang Engstfeld)
- Ouverture éclair (1977) (Michel Herr Trio)
- Solis Lacus (1975)

=== Albums as a piano player, composer, arranger, etc... (a selection) ===
- O Celli in America (8 cellists. Arranger of an Ellington medley) (2022)
- The black days sessions (Daniel Romeo/Arranger) (2020)
- We have a dream (Tutu Puoane & Brussels Jazz Orchestra/ Arranger) (2018)
- Udiverse (Fabrice Alleman & Chamber orchestra/Arranger & composer) (2017)
- The string project (Philip Catherine/ Arranger) (2016) Echo Jazz Award 2016 (D)
- Colors of Time (Thierry Lang & David Linx/ Arranger) (2013)
- Crush (Ivan Paduart & the Metropole Orchestra/ Arranger) (2010)
- Let me hear a simple song (Radoni's Tribe / Arranger) (2009)
- Jazz Olympics (1 track feat. David Linx / Brussels Jazz Orchestra) (2008)
- Changing Faces (1 track feat. David Linx / Brussels Jazz Orchestra) (2007)
- Sides of Life (Fabrice Alleman) (2004)
- Restless (Jean-Pierre Catoul / Peter Hertmans) (1999)
- The live takes (Toots Thielemans) (1999)
- En public (Phil Abraham Quartet) (1997)
- O brilho do Sol (Marito Correa) (1996)
- Intensive Act (Félix Simtaine) (1996)
- L'affaire (Vladimir Cosma/Toots Thielemans, movie soundtrack) (1994)
- Loop the loop (Fabrice Alleman Quartet) (1993)
- Take it from the top (Denise Jannah) (1991)
- Bim bim (Bruno Castellucci) (1987)
- Extremes (Act Big Band and guests) (1987)
- Solid Steps (Joe Lovano) (1986)
- Transparence (Philip Catherine) (1986)
- Sweet seventina (Bert Joris) (1985)
- Your precious love (Toots Thielemans) (1984)
- Soon spring (John Ruocco) (1983)
- Steve Houben + strings (1982)
- Act Big Band (1981)
- Remembering Bobby Jaspar and Rene Thomas (Saxo 1000) (1980)
- Dom Rocket (Gijs Hendriks Quartet) (1979)
- Live in Solothurn (Zbigniew Seifert Variospheres) (rec. 1976, released on cd in 2017)

=== As a composer, arranger for movies ===
- Le Scoop (Jean-Louis Colmant) (1977) (TV)
- La Mésaventure (Freddy Charles) (1980) (TV)
- Les Fugitifs (Freddy Charles) (1981) (TV)
- San Francisco (Freddy Charles) (1982) (TV)
- Les Magiciens du mercredi (Freddy Charles) (1984) (TV)
- Just Friends (Marc-Henri Wajnberg) (1993)
- Éclats de famille (Didier Grousset) (1994) (TV)
- Les Monos / Le responsable (Didier Grousset) (1999) (TV)
- Le Coup du lapin (Didier Grousset) (2000) (TV)
- Odette Toulemonde (Eric-Emmanuel Schmitt) (Nicola Piovani) (arranger/orchestrator of Joséphine Baker songs) (2007)
- Un crime très populaire (Didier Grousset) (2007) (TV)
