= Bert Joris =

Belgian jazz musician (born 1957)

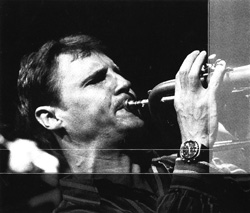
Bert Joris

Bert Joris (born 18 January 1957 in Antwerp) is an internationally renowned jazz trumpeter, composer and arranger from Belgium. In 1996 he received the Golden Django.
