= Steve Houben =

Belgian jazz saxophonist and flutist (1950–2026)

Steve Houben (19 March 1950 – 21 March 2026) was a Belgian jazz saxophonist and flutist.

== Life and career ==
Houben was born in Liège, Belgium on 19 March 1950. In the mid-1970s, Houben attended the Berklee College of Music in Boston. When he returned to Belgium, he established the jazz seminar at the Liège conservatory, in association with Henri Pousseur. In his long career, he played with Joe Newman, Bill Frisell, Toots Thielemans, Chet Baker, Mike Stern, George Coleman, and Gerry Mulligan.

He won the Belgian Golden Django in 2000 for best Belgian artist (first winner of the new category). Houben was one of the first musicians to see the potential of the singer Melanie De Biasio, inviting her to perform at several concerts and a tour of Russia. He also appeared on her first album, "A Stomach is Burning". He later taught jazz saxophone at the Brussels conservatory.

Houben died on 21 March 2026 in Banneux, at the age of 76.

== Discography ==
- 1980: Chet Baker & Steve Houben (52e Rue Est)
- 1994: Blue Circumstances
- 1995: Songs by Gershwin & Porter
- 2000: Le Saxophone et le Jazz
- 2007: Un Ange Passe
- 2011: Darker Scales with Boyan Vodenitcharov
- 2017: Comptines (re-release of a 1982 album with pianist Charles Loos)
