= Diederik Wissels =

Dutch jazz pianist

Diederik Wissels (born December 1960, in Rotterdam, Netherlands) is a Dutch jazz pianist.

In 1968, he moved to Brussels, Belgium and later attended Boston's Berklee College of Music. In his early career, he played with Chet Baker, Joe Henderson and Toots Thielemans. Wissels' solo and duo recordings include "The Hillock Songstress" (1994), "From This Day Forward" (1997), "Streams" with Bart Defoort (2001), "Song of You" (2004) and "Pasarela" (2017). "Secrecy" (2020), "Yearn" (2023) and "Sleepless" (2024) were recorded with Portuguese jazz singer Ana Rocha.

He appears regularly in concert and has also recorded with David Linx, for example on Viktor Lazlo's album Amour(s).
