= Charles Loos =

Belgian jazz pianist and composer (born 1951)

Charles Loos (born 29 July 1951 in Brussels) is a Belgian jazz pianist and composer. In 1972 he began studying composition and jazz orchestra at Berklee College of Music in Boston, while he already followed a classical formation in Belgium. Back in his country, he co-founded Les Lundis d'Hortense, a Belgian association for jazz musicians. From 1993 to 1997, he was the president of Les Lundis d'Hortense. He won the Belgian Golden Django in 1997 for best French-speaking artist.

Loos has released over 20 albums as a leader or co-leader.
