= Jacques Pelzer =

- Born: 24 June 1924; Liège, Belgium
- Died: 6 August 1994 (aged 70) Liège, Belgium
- Genres: Jazz
- Instrument: Saxophone, Flute

Jacques Pelzer (24 June 1924 – 6 August 1994) was a Belgian musician. He played alto saxophone and flute. Notably, his performance with Chet Baker was included on Baker's quintet's Brussels 1964 album.

He made his debut in 1947 the jazz band the "Bob Shots", which also featured René Thomas and Bobby Jaspar.

Over the years, he played with most of the great Belgian jazzmen (Toots Thielemans, Francy Boland, Benoît Quersin, Philip Catherine...) but also with many American jazzmen (Dexter Gordon, Stan Getz, Lee Konitz, Philly Joe Jones, Bill Evans, Chet Baker...).

His music was impregnated by bebop but also by cool jazz and the music of Lennie Tristano. However, in the 1960s he sometimes played free jazz (with Don Cherry, Gato Barbieri, Archie Shepp…) and, in the 1970s, jazz fusion (with the group “Open Sky Unit”). Beginning in the 1980s, he returned to more “classical” aesthetics and “acoustic” jazz.
