= De Werf =

Coordinates: 51°13′10″N 3°13′13″E

De Werf was an arts center and jazz record label (W.E.R.F.) in Bruges, Belgium. In 2002, the label released an eleven-CD box set titled The Finest of Belgian Jazz, with music by Greetings from Mercury, Aka Moon, Brussels Jazz Orchestra, and Kris Defoort. Rik Bevernage, De Werf's main collaborator, received an award at the 2002 Golden Django ceremony.

In 2017, De Werf and Vrijstaat O (Ostend) merged into a new organisation, KAAP. The W.E.R.F. record label continues its activities under the original name.

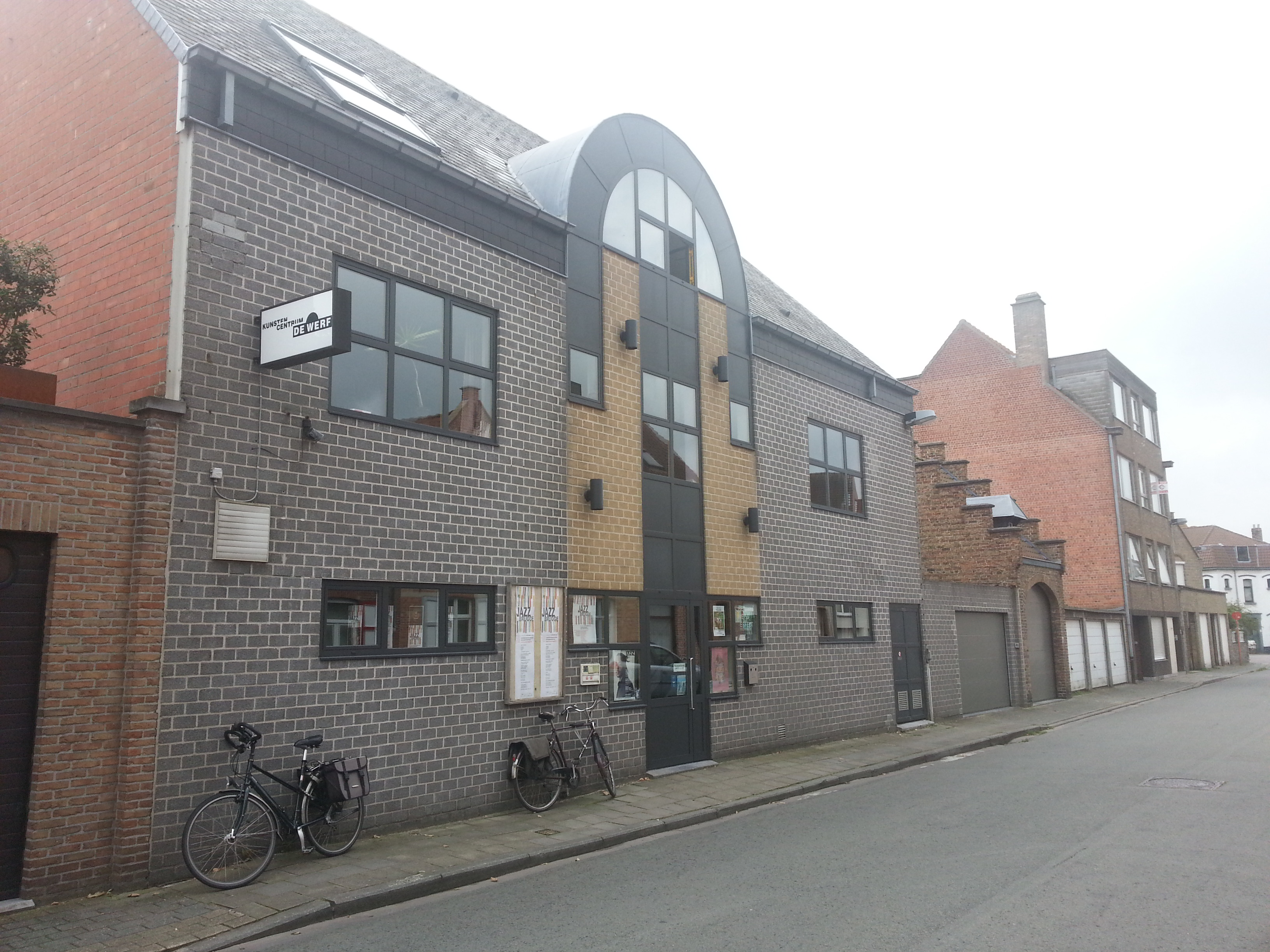
The De Werf concert hall

De Werf has its own concert hall where many jazz bands perform. There are also theatre pieces and events for children. In February 2009, public funding for the venue was removed because the club didn't produce relevant or up-to-date concerts and theatre performances, making a closure of De Werf from 31 December 2009 likely. However, new productions continued in 2014.

== W.E.R.F. Discography ==
=== 1993–1999 ===
- K. D.'s Basement Party : Sketches of Belgium (1993)
- Octurn : Chromatic History (1994)
- K.D.'s Decade : K.D.'s Decade Live (1994)
- Kris Defoort and Fabrizio Cassol : Variations on A Love Supreme (1995)
- Joe Fonda, Carlo Morena, and Jeff Hirshfield : What We're Hearing (1996)
- Octurn : Ocean (1997)
- Bart Defoort Quartet : Moving (1997)
- The Fonda/Stevens Group : Live from Bruges (1997)
- Laurent Blondiau Quintet : The Queen of the Apple Pie (1998)
- Chris Joris Experience: Live 1997 (1998)
- Ernst Vranckx Quartet featuring Kenny Wheeler : A Child's Blessing (1998)
- Kris Defoort Quartet and Kris Defoort & Dreamtime : Passages (1999)
- Frank Vaganée Trio featuring John Ruocco : Two Trios (1999)
- Ode for Joe : Caribbean Fire Dance (1999)
- Brussels Jazz Orchestra : The September Sessions (1999)

=== 2000 ===
- Ben Sluijs Quartet : Candy Century
- Octurn : Round
- Joe Fonda, Carlo Morena and Jeff Hirshfield : Step-In
- Mark Dresser and Mark Elias : The Marks Brothers

=== 2001 ===
- Ernst Vranckx Quintet : Songs & Dances
- Ben Sluijs Quartet : Seasounds
- Erik Vermeulen trio : Songs of Minutes
- Rêve d'éléphant Orchestra : Racines Du Ciel
- Christoph Erbstösser Trio : Vive Les Etrangers
- Trio Grande : Signé Trio Grande

=== 2002 ===
- Various artists : The Finest in Belgian Jazz (11-CD box set) with :
  - Brussels Jazz Orchestra : The Music of Bert Joris
  - Greetings from Mercury : Heiwa
  - Aka Moon : Guitars
  - Nathalie Loriers Trio + Extensions : Tombouctou
  - Octurn : Dimensions
  - Ben Sluijs Quartet : Flying Circles
  - Philip Catherine : Summer Night
  - Bert Joris Quartet : Live
  - Erik Vermeulen trio : Inner City
  - Kris Defoort, Mark Turner, Nicolas Thys and Jim Black : Sound Plaza

=== 2003 ===
- The Chris Joris Experience : Out of the Night
- Bart Defoort Quartet : The Lizard Game
- Jan De Haas Quintet: Doing My Thing

=== 2004 ===
- Mahieu-Vantomme Quartet : Whatever
- Rêve d'éléphant Orchestra : Lobster Caravan
- André Goudbeek, Xu Fengxia, and Joe Fonda : Separate Realities
- High Voltage : Hoppin' Around
- Koen De Cauter, Fapy Lafertin, Patrick Saussois, Joop Ayal, Tcha Limberger, Waso De Cauter, and Dajo De Cauter : Django!

=== 2005 ===
- Ben Sluijs Quartet : True Nature
- Kris Defoort, Koen Kessels, Claron McFadden & Dreamtime : ConVerSations/ConSerVations
- Hendrik Braeckman, Bert Joris, Kurt Van Herck, Piet Verbist & Jan de Haas : til now
- Bart Maris, Zeger Vandenbussche, Mathias Van de Wiele, Dajo De Cauter & Giovanni Barcella : Konglong

=== 2006 ===
- Fabrizio Cassol, Bart Defoort, Michel Massot, Stéphane Galland & Kris Defoort : Live at The Werf
- Robin Verheyen, Harmen Fraanje, Clemens van der Feen & Flin van Hemmen : Narcissus
- Nathalie Loriers, Sal La Rocca, Hans Van Oosterhout : Silent Spring
- Peer Baierlein, Ewout Pierreux, David Petrocca & Yves Peeters : Open Questions
- Brussels Jazz Orchestra : Countermove
- Nathalie Loriers & Chemins Croisés : L'arbre pleure
- Ben Sluijs, Jeroen Van Herzeele, Manolo Cabras & Marek Patrman : Somewhere in Between
- Eric Person, Bob Stewart, Fabian Fioriini, Reggie Washington, Chris Mentens, Baba Sissoko, Junior Mthombeni & Chris Joris : Rainbow Country
- Bart Quartier, Nico Schepers, Bart Defoort, Jean-Louis Rassinfosse & Jan de Haas : Thank You
- Laurent Blondiau, Jeroen Van Herzeele, Jean-Yves Evrard, Jozef Dumoulin, Sébastien Boisseau, Eric Thielemans, guest(s), Sophie Kokaj & Samanta7 : 5

=== 2007 ===
- Pierre Van Dormael & Octurn : North Country Suite
- Saxafabra & Cezariusz Gadzina : Saxafabra
- Songs for Broadcast : RadioKUKAorkest

== See also ==
- List of record labels
