= Guitars (Aka Moon album) =

Studio album by Aka Moon
- Released: April 2002
- Recorded: August 2001
- Genre: Jazz
- Length: 65:15
- Label: De Werf

Aka Moon chronology
Invisible Moon (2001)	''Guitars'' (2002)

Professional ratings
Review scores
Source	Rating
All About Jazz	link

Guitars is a 2002 album by jazz band Aka Moon. It was recorded in two days (August 18 and 19, 2001) at Studio Jet (Brussels, Belgium). It is the third CD from the 11-CD box edited by De Werf. Tracks 4, 5 and 6 are dedicated respectively to Jimi Hendrix, Jaco Pastorius and John Scofield, three great "guitarists".

== Track listing ==
1. "A La Luce Di Paco - Act 1" – 5:02
2. "A La Luce Di Paco - Act 2" – 7:03
3. "A La Luce Di Paco - Act 3" – 4:20
4. "Jimi's Three Words" – 8:46
5. "The Last Call From Jaco" – 5:47
6. "Scofield" – 5:38
7. "From Influence To Innocence" – 7:09
8. "Bill's Dreams" – 12:06
9. "Yang-Yin-Yang" – 4:15
10. "Three Oceans" – 5:07

== Personnel ==
- Fabrizio Cassol - alto saxophone, compositions (except on 1)
- Michel Hatzigeorgiou - bass guitar
- Stéphane Galland - drums
- Pierre Van Dormael - guitar
- Prasanna - guitar, composition (on 1)
- David Gilmore - guitar
