= Variations on A Love Supreme =

Studio album by Fabrizio Cassol and Kris Defoort
- Released: 1995
- Recorded: May 1995
- Genre: Jazz
- Length: 70:45
- Label: De Werf

Variations on A Love Supreme is a jazz album composed by Fabrizio Cassol and Kris Defoort. It contains variations on A Love Supreme, the classic jazz album by the John Coltrane quartet. It was released in 1995 on the De Werf label, and is representative of the Belgian jazz scene.

Variations on A Love Supreme is also the name of the big band (led by Kris Defoort and Fabrizio Cassol) performing those compositions, for example at La Monnaie, Brussels in 1999. Some musicians were replaced for some concerts; for example, Michel Massot by Geoffroy De Masure, and George Alexander Van Dam by Dominique Pifarely or Gunda Gottschalk.

== Track listing ==
=== Part one ===
1. "The Seed" — composition by Kris Defoort and Fabrizio Cassol
2. "Variation 1" — F. Cassol
3. "Variation 2: Pursuance" — John Coltrane, arrangement by F. Cassol
4. "Variation 3" — F. Cassol

=== Part two ===
1. "Variation 4" — F. Cassol
2. "Variation 5" — K. Defoort
3. "Variation 6: Resolution" — John Coltrane, arrangement by K. Defoort

=== Part three ===
1. "Variation 7" — K. Defoort
2. "Variation 8" — K. Defoort

== Personnel ==
- Fabrizio Cassol — alto saxophone
- Kris Defoort — piano
- Jeroen Van Herzeele — tenor and soprano saxophone
- Pierre Bernard — flute
- Antoine Prawerman — clarinet
- Jan Kuijken — cello
- Laurent Blondiau — trumpet
- George Alexander Van Dam — violin
- Michel Massot — trombone, tuba
- Stéphane Galland — drums
- Michel Hatzigeorgiou — bass
