= Erik Vermeulen =

Belgian pianist

- Born: 15 October 1959 (age 66); Ypres, Belgium
- Genres: Jazz
- Instrument: Piano

Erik Vermeulen (born 15 October 1959 in Ypres, Belgium) is a Belgian jazz pianist. He entered the Belgian jazz scene when he was 22 with his trio. At the time, it featured Hein Van de Geyn on bass and Dré Pallemaerts on drums. Soon after that, he started performing with different jazz bands and musicians including the Frank Vaganée Quartet, Erwin Vann Quartet and Peter Hertmans.

He performed with international stars like Slide Hampton, Clark Terry, Joe Lovano, Steve Grossman, David Schnitter, Art Farmer, Bob Mover, Teddy Edwards, Toots Thielemans, Philip Catherine, Michael Moore and Barre Phillips.

He was often a soloist with the BRT jazz orchestra. In 1998, he represented Belgium in the European Radio Union Big Band in Stockholm.

During his career, the musicians from his trio have changed: Jean-Louis Rassinfosse and Félix Simtaine, then Philippe Aerts and Dré Pallemaerts, Otti Van Der Werf and Eric Thielemans.

Since 1995, Erik has toured and recorded with the following bands: Bart Defoort Quartet, Ben Sluijs Quartet, Manu Hermia Quartet and Marta Mus.

Since 1995, he has been a member of the Ben Sluijs Quartet, with whom he recorded four CDs. The last one, Flying Circles, is part of the CD box "The Finest in Belgian Jazz" (released on De Werf).

In 1997, he recorded a CD with his band Icarus Consort (consisting of Erwin Vann, Pierre Bernard, Nicolas Thys and Stéphane Galland). The project emphasis is on improvisation.

Performing solo or in duo with Pierre Bernard, Daniel Stokart or Eric Thielemans, led to the founding of the "Groundwork" collective (2000).

In 2001, he recorded his CD "Songs of Minutes" with Salvatore La Rocca and Jan De Haas. In the same year, he recorded the album Stones with Ben Sluijs and made recordings with the project "Rrauw" of Eric Thielemans, with Barre Philips and Jean-Yves Evrard.

In 2002, he got to know Eric Surmenian (double bass) and Marek Patrman (drums). With this trio, he recorded Inner City from the CD box "The Finest in Belgian Jazz".

These days, Erik Vermeulen is teaching jazz piano at the Antwerp and Ghent conservatories. This is also where the piano duo "Antiduo" started with his then pupil Seppe Gebruers. They released two albums together: one in 2013 'antiduo' and one in 2017 Rorschach. On the latter, the duo was expanded to include the two drummers Eric Thielemans and Marek Patrman.

In November 2003, he received the Belgian Golden Django for musician of the year.

== Discographie ==
=== Erik Vermeulen Trio ===
- Live Chroma (W.E.R.F., 2009)
- Inner City (W.E.R.F., 2002)
- Songs of Minutes (W.E.R.F., 2000)

=== Seppe Gebruers and Erik Vermeulen ===
- Antiduo (eNR, 2013)
- Rorschach (eNR, 2017) feat. Eric Thielemans and Marek Patrman

=== Ben Sluijs and Erik Vermeulen Duo ===
- Decades (W.E.R.F., 2014)
- Parity (W.E.R.F., 2010)
- Stones (W.E.R.F., 2010)
