= Heiwa (album) =

Studio album by Greetings From Mercury
- Released: March 2002
- Genre: Jazz
- Length: 46:20
- Label: Tracks

Greetings From Mercury chronology
Continuance (1999)	Heiwa (2002)

Heiwa is a 2002 album by jazz fusion band Greetings From Mercury. It is the second release compiled in the 11-CD box edited by De Werf the same year. It was also distributed as a simple album by Bang Records (with a different cover).

== Track listing ==
1. "One by One"
2. "my Mojo=my Dojo"
3. "Tanger la Nuit"
4. "Cold Rain DNA"
5. "Heiwa"
6. "We Must"
7. "Closer"
8. "2001"
9. "Darkhauns (alap-jod-jahla)"
10. "Everyone's World"

== Personnel ==
- Jeroen Van Herzeele - tenor saxophone, leader
- Peter Hertmans - guitar
- Otti Van Der Werf - electric bass
- Stéphane Galland - drums
- Steven Segers - rap
- Michel Andina - sitar
- DJ Grazzhoppa - wheelz of steel on 6,7 and 10
