= Seppe Gebruers =

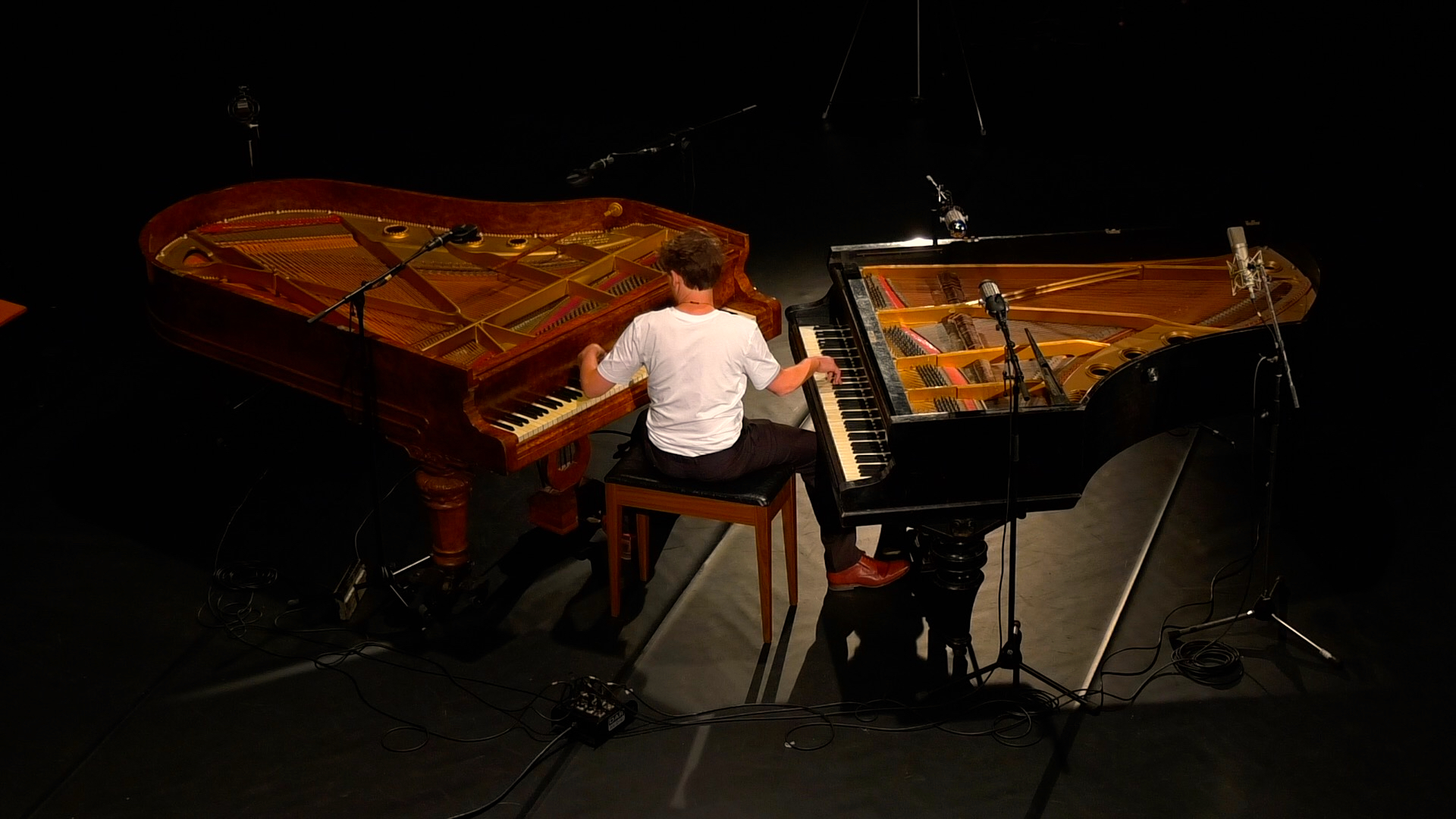
- Recording Playing with Standards at Kunstencentrum Nona, Mechelen Belgium, 2021

Background information
- Born: Seppe Gebruers; 1990 (age 35–36); Wilrijk, Belgium
- Origin: Antwerp, Belgium.
- Genres: Improvisation; Microtonality; Jazz; Experimental
- Occupation: Musician / Composer / Improviser /researcher
- Instruments: piano, organ, carillon, harmonium
- Website: Official website

Seppe Gebruers (born May 9, 1990) is a Belgian musician, composer and improvisor. He is also a teacher and researcher at KASK conservatory Ghent. Gebruers plays both solo and in bands. His work ranges from jazz to contemporary classical music.

Since his first concerts at the age of twelve Gebruers has gained a reputation as a musician. Currently, he investigates the possibilities of quartertones in piano, composition and improvisation.

== Early life ==
Gebruers started to play classical piano when he was 8 years old, but soon became interested in jazz. Jef Neve became his teacher and at age 12 he played in Belgium and abroad with his pianotrio (with Jakob Warmenbol and Nathan Wouters). In 2004 he performed at Sportpaleis for Night of the Proms. The same year he won a grant for Young Musical Talent.

At age 17 he shared the stage with Jim Black and Andrew D'Angelo and met musicians such as Kris Defoort, Bill Carrothers, Eric Thielemans, and Jozef Dumoulin.

At the Royal Conservatoire Antwerp he studied both jazz (with Erik Vermeulen) and classical piano (with Levente Kende). Gebruers started his education with a clear vision: "I knew which direction I wanted to go in: I wanted to make contemporary music that sounds intuitive."

While Gebruers often clashed with the traditional ways of the academy, he quickly developed a strong connection with Vermeulen. The latter quickly concluded that 'he had nothing left to teach' and the teacher-student relation soon developed into one of musical sparring partners.

== Later life and career ==
Gebruers was the leader of the large ensemble Ifa y Xango which won the 2011 Jong Jazztalent Gent award and performed at Gent Jazz in 2012.

Their "irreverence, brought about by a sense of quasi-naïve frankness, would become the group's and Gebruers' trademark".

Their first album 'Abraham' was selected by New York City Jazz Record (US) as 'Best Debut Releases 2013'. Their second album 'twice left handed \\ shavings' (2015) experiments with electronic music. Here Gebruers plays with electronic instruments and live sound processing.

In these years, Gebruers also collaborated closely with his teacher Erik Vermeulen. They formed a piano duo and in 2013 they released their album 'Antiduo'. Later, the duo became a quartet with drummers Marek Patrman and Eric Thielemans, resulting in the album 'Rorschach' (2019).

About Gebruers' performance in 'Antiduo', the press wrote:

"Mean, against the grain, and unhindered by standard musical practice, Gebruers develops an unfettered entity, which is not in the least bit concerned about what is allowed or taboo, or the way things are supposed to be."

In 2013 Gebruers' group Bambi Pang Pang (with Viktor Perdieus (saxophone) and Laurens Smet (double bass)) played at Jazz Middelheim with the legendary American drummer Andrew Cyrille. This collaboration led to another album 'Drop your plans' (2015).

In 2013 Gebruers co-founded the musical collective Troika, of which he is the artistic director. Troika is an organization that regards improvisation as a means to make music rather than as a genre. With this idea in mind Troika organizes concerts, produces albums and conducts interviews.

Gebruers also forms a duo with the composer and visual artist Charlemagne Palestine. Together, they play four differently tuned piano's. In 2018, Gebruers' played a piece composed by Charlemagne for the carillon in the Cathedral of Our Lady in Antwerp.

Other collaborations include Evan Parker, Paul Lytton, Robin Verheyen and Nate Wooley.

== Microtonality ==
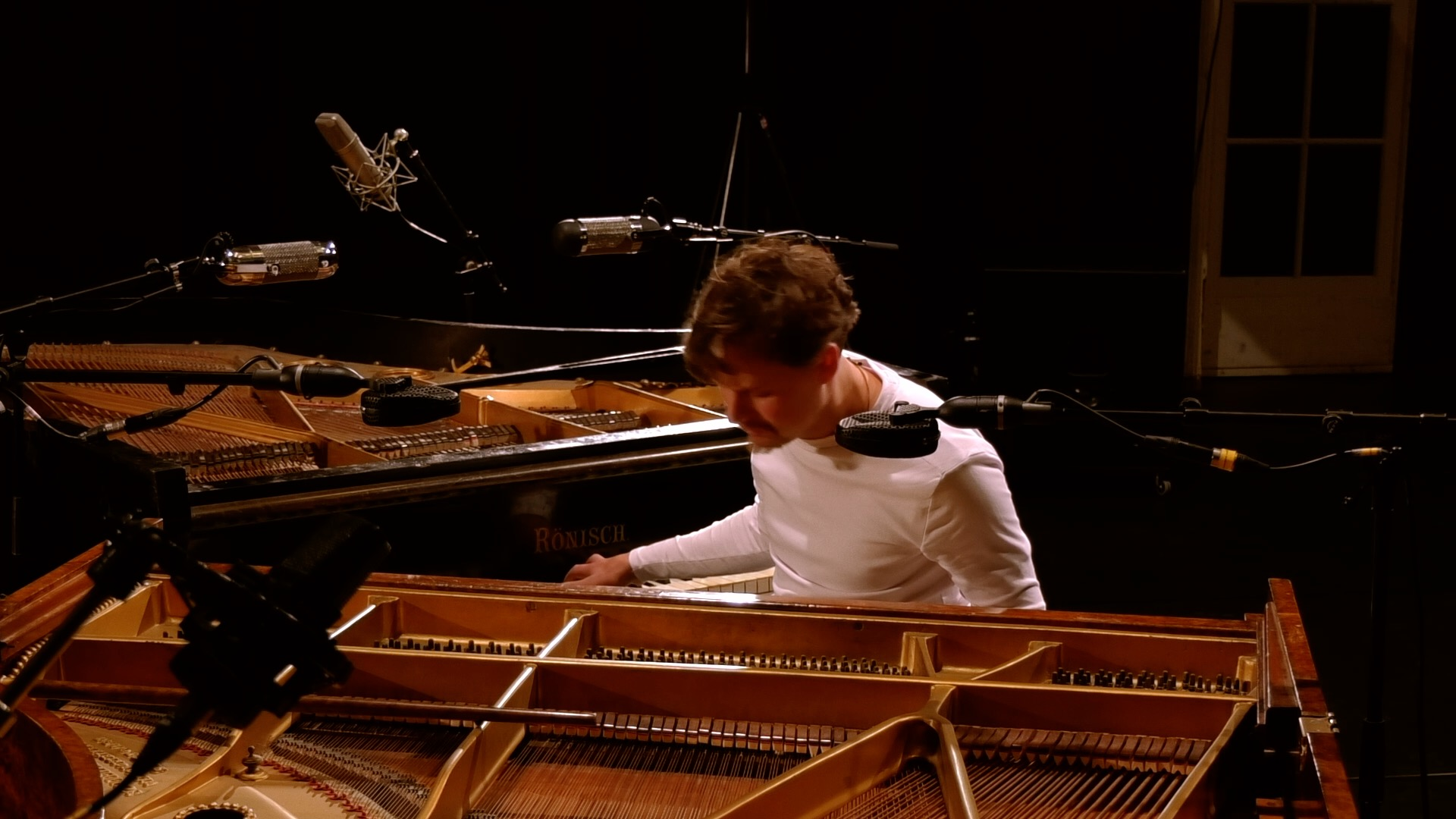

Currently, Gebruers' major project is the exploration of microtonality. For this, he plays and improvises with two pianos tuned a quarter-tone apart.

In 2019 he started a research project at the Royal Conservatory of Ghent, titled 'Unexplored possibilities of contemporary improvisation and the influence of microtonality in the creation process'. Referring to the project, Gebruers commented, "tuning the pianos a quartertone apart, I play with our collective artificial habit: the equal temperament. Since J.S. Bach's Das wohltemporierte Klavier, the custom in Europe is to have twelve equal semitones in one octave; a uniform system of tuning that still dominates Western music. Adding quartertones, one octave is divided into twenty-four equal intervals, multiplying the harmonic possibilities. Thus, our playmate – tonality – who had become a self-evident tool, is brought to the fore. I do this both to question the tradition and out of love for it."

in "the choice to play each keyboard with only one hand ... the possibilities of microtonality reach their full disorienting potential. Placing two differently tuned pianos next to or across one another makes playing "right" and "off-key" lose all their meanings, and allows the music to unfold in all its kaleidoscopic glory" (Koen van Meel)

With two pianos tuned a quarter tone apart Gebruers recorded 'The Room: Time & Space' (2018) in a trio formation with drummer Paul Lovens and bassist Hugo Anthunes.

In his solo project 'Playing with standards' (album release January 2023), Gebruers plays with famous songs including jazz standards. With Paul Lytton and Nils Vermeulen he forms a 'Playing with standards' trio.

== A plea for polyphony ==
Seppe Gebruers critiques the professionalisation of the arts, particularly the music industry, for prioritising commercial and ideological agendas over authentic, transformative experiences in music. He questions the current relationship between artist, audience, and the cultural institutions that mediate this interaction, suggesting that these dynamics compromise the essence of musical creativity.

The Impact of Professionalisation

Gebruers observes that the arts are increasingly driven by consumerist goals, with agencies, curators, and managers shaping what is created and how it is received. He notes:

"Music is often created as a made-to-order product, tailored to the vision of the curator or what is deemed commercially successful."

This professionalisation places musicians in a precarious position, forcing them to cater to industry standards rather than pursue their artistic visions. He warns of a cultural climate where aesthetic complexity is sacrificed for ideological and logistical concerns, reducing art to something easily consumable and marketable.

=== Authenticity vs. Presentation ===
A recurring theme in Gebruers' essay is the conflict between authentic artistic expression and the pressure to present one's work in a comprehensible, polished format. He laments the loss of "tasting" in music—a dynamic, experiential engagement:

"Once the musician identifies with a ‘taste,’ it becomes a conscious product that can be consumed as a fashion. Taste is no longer in the constant motion of tasting and adjusting."

Gebruers advocates for "aesthetic empathy," where both musician and listener engage in a shared process of discovery. This stands in contrast to the industry’s preference for predictable, recognisable styles.

=== Diversity as an Ethical Display ===
While acknowledging the importance of diversity, Gebruers critiques its superficial implementation in the arts. He argues that the overemphasis on representation often leads to performative gestures rather than substantive inclusion:

"When diversity is exhibited too emphatically, profound diversity is often lacking."

This performativity, he suggests, can undermine genuine efforts toward inclusivity, replacing meaningful engagement with tokenistic displays.

=== Polyphony as a Model ===
Gebruers proposes polyphony—the interplay of diverse and independent voices—as a model for rethinking cultural dialogue and decision-making. Drawing inspiration from Johann Sebastian Bach’s Ricercar a 6, he argues for an approach that embraces tension and difference rather than seeking uniformity or consensus:

"Being polyphonic is a complex exercise in which you constantly learn to sense your place in a group."

This model, he suggests, could foster more dynamic and inclusive discussions among artists, curators, and other stakeholders, leading to a richer and more unpredictable cultural landscape.

== Esthetics ==
"My music is not that much 'beautiful', but it is personal. I have often thought about the way communication flows between musician and audience, and what it is that goes wrong so often. The best scenario would be an audience that more or less 'undergoes' the music, like a dream or a nightmare, which the audience dares to go along with you, into the depth. But often it fails because of the social aspect. Because of celebrity. Take, for instance, The Beatles. Fans thought the concert was a dazzling success before it even began." "Beauty is recognisability and recognisability is very important for people. In western society everyone is prone to the will to understand. We don't go to school to 'undergo' something, but to understand something." "I love hearing the lack of control of a musician that you cross limits and lose track of time and space. And that's how I lose control over my facial expressions."

"I do try to be in command of the two of them: control and the lack of it. That way I can return to my comfort zone when I need to. You can easily see when I play collectedly. Then I sit straight like a classical pianist."

Translated from a dutch interview with Seppe Gebruers:

Interview met Seppe Gebruers over Antiduo, door Koen Van Meel, Kwadratuur: Seppe Gebruers (Antiduo, Ifa y Xango), Met "nieuw" ben ik niet bezig, met het onverwachte wel, Door Koen Van Meel | Toegevoegd op 1 januari 2014

=== Playing with two pianos ===
"Adding quarter tones gives a greater diversity of emotional charge in harmony and melody," says Seppe. "As pianists, we often think in black and white. Now you suddenly start thinking in between." "Music should not be understood, music should be experienced. There is no such thing as difficult music. This is not difficult music. It may wring, but that wringing or that tension is also an experience, those are also emotions that can be addressed. My research is successful if people take more time to start experiencing music again."

From an interview by Olav Grondelaers in his radioprogram 'Music Matters' made for the Belgian radio station radio klara broadcast by the VRT. Later also published by Troika's Youtube channel with English subtitles.

== Compositions ==
Gebruers created music for films: Het zwijgen van elena (2012), The Reconstruction (2016), and Etangs Noirs (2018) and for several theatre pieces by Tibaldus].

== Awards ==
- SABAM Jazz Award ‍2014 "a great musical daring and striking curiosity that go beyond the usual formulae" (the Sabam Awards)
- Best Debut record 2012, 'Abraham' by Ifa y Xango selected by the New York City Jazz magazine.
- Jong Jazz Talent 2012, Ifa y Xango, Gent Jazz.

As a teenager:

- My First Night 2004 (First Prize of the piano competition of the Night Of The Proms Belgium, Sportpaleis)
- Music Live 2004 – Jeugd & Muziek (with the trio 'Jazzfact with Jakob Warmenbol & Nathan Wouters)

== Discography ==
Year recorded	Year released	Title	Label	Notes
2012	2012	Abraham		Ifa y Xango
2010-2012	2013	Antiduo	el negocito records	Duo, with Erik Vermeulen (piano)
2014	2015	Drop your plans	el negocito records	Bambi pang pang (with Viktor Perdieus and Laurens Smet) feat. Andrew Cyrille
2014	2015	Twice left handed // Shavings	el negocito records	Ifa y Xango (tentet)
2015	2016	Rub	el negocito records	Nest
2017	2018	Live at ljublijana	Multikulti Project	Trio, with Luís Vicente (trumpet) and Onno Govaert (drums)
2015	2016	The Room: Time & Space	el negocito records, Poo Torch, and Troika vzw	Trio, with Hugo Antunes (bass), Paul Lovens (drums)
2016	2017	Rorschach	el negocito records	Quartet, with Erik Vermeulen (piano), Marek Patrman (drums), Eric Thielemans (drums)
2022	2022	A Room With No Name	Fundacja Słuchaj	Trio with Luís Vicente (trumpet) and Onno Govaert (drums)
2017	2022	Harmoniums	Aspen Edities	Duo, with Thijs Troch (harmonium)
2021	2023	Playing with Standards 1, 2 and 3	el negocito records	Solo, with two pianos tuned a quartertone apart
2024	2025	Beyondddddd The Notessssss	Konnekt	Charlemagne Palestine & Seppe Gebruers, microtonal pianos
