= List of people from Mysore =

This is a list of people from Mysore.

- Anima Anandkumar, Bren Professor of Computing at Caltech and director of Machine Learning research at NVIDIA
- Mysore T. Chowdiah, Pioneer of the seven-string Violin, Sangeetha Kalanidhi
- Sabu Dastagir, Hollywood Actor, inducted into the Hollywood Walk of Fame
- Gita Gopinath, Chief economist, IMF
- Vikas Gowda, Olympian, discus thrower and shot putter, Commonwealth Games Gold-Medallist
- B. K. S. Iyengar, Yoga Expert, Padma Vibhushan
- Mysore V. Doraiswamy Iyengar, Veena exponent, Padma Bhushan, Sangeetha Kalanidhi
- R. K. Laxman, cartoonist, Padma Vibhushan, Ramon Magsaysay Award for Journalism, Literature and Creative Communication Arts
- Pavitra Lokesh, actress, Karnataka State Film Award for Best Actress
- N. R. Narayana Murthy, industrialist, co-founder of Infosys, Padma Vibhushan
- V. K. Murthy, cinematographer, Dada Saheb Phalke Award Winner
- Mysore brothers, Violin maestros and music composers, comprising Mysore Manjunath and Mysore Nagaraj
- R. K. Narayan, writer, Padma Vibhushan
- R. K. Srikantan, carnatic music vocalist, Padma Bhushan, Sangeetha Kalanidhi
- Javagal Srinath, former cricketer and current ICC Match referee
- Mysore Vasudevachar, musician and composer, Padma Bhushan
