= Heiwa =

Heiwa (平和), the Japanese word for peace, may refer to:

- Heiwa, Aichi, a town in Aichi Prefecture, Japan
- Heiwa (album), an album by jazz fusion band Greetings From Mercury
- Heiwa Corporation, a Japanese manufacturer of pachinko machines
- DREAM (Mixed Martial Arts) (HEIWA DREAM), a Japanese mixed martial arts promotion run by Fighting and Entertainment Group (owners of K-1) and co-produced with the former PRIDE executives from Dream Stage Entertainment
