= Continuance (disambiguation) =

Continuance is the postponement of legal proceedings.

Continuance may also refer to:

- Continuance (Currensy and the Alchemist album), 2022
- Continuance (film), 2021 American horror film
- Continuance (Greetings from Mercury album), 1999
