= Mâäk's Spirit =

Belgian avant-gardist jazz band

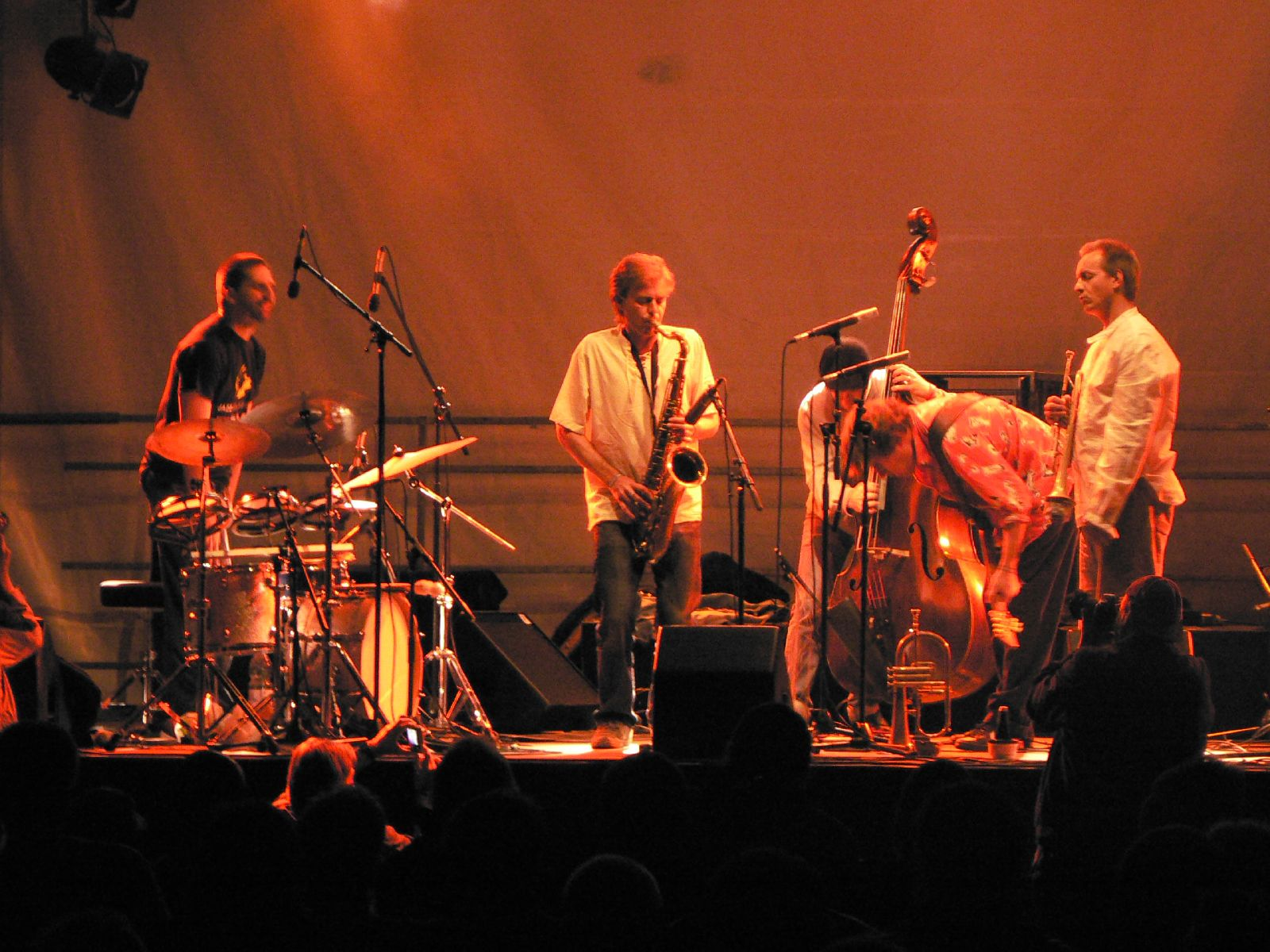
Photo by Andy Newcombe

Mâäk's Spirit is a Belgian avant-gardist jazz band. They recorded their first album live in Ghent in 1998. The band was then composed of Jeroen Van Herzeele (alto saxophone), Laurent Blondiau (trumpet and flugelhorn), Salvatore La Rocca (double bass) and Hans Van Oosterhout (drums). For the next two albums, the line-up changed to :

- Jeroen Van Herzeele (tenor saxophone)
- Laurent Blondiau (trumpet)
- Michel Massot (tubas, trombone)
- Jean-Yves Evrard (guitar)
- Otti Van Der Werf (acoustic bass)
- Eric Thielemans (drums)

== Discography ==
- "Live" (1998)
- "Le nom du vent" (2003)
- "Al Majmaâ" featuring Gnawa Express de Tanger and Baba Sissoko (2004)
