= Mysore Brothers =

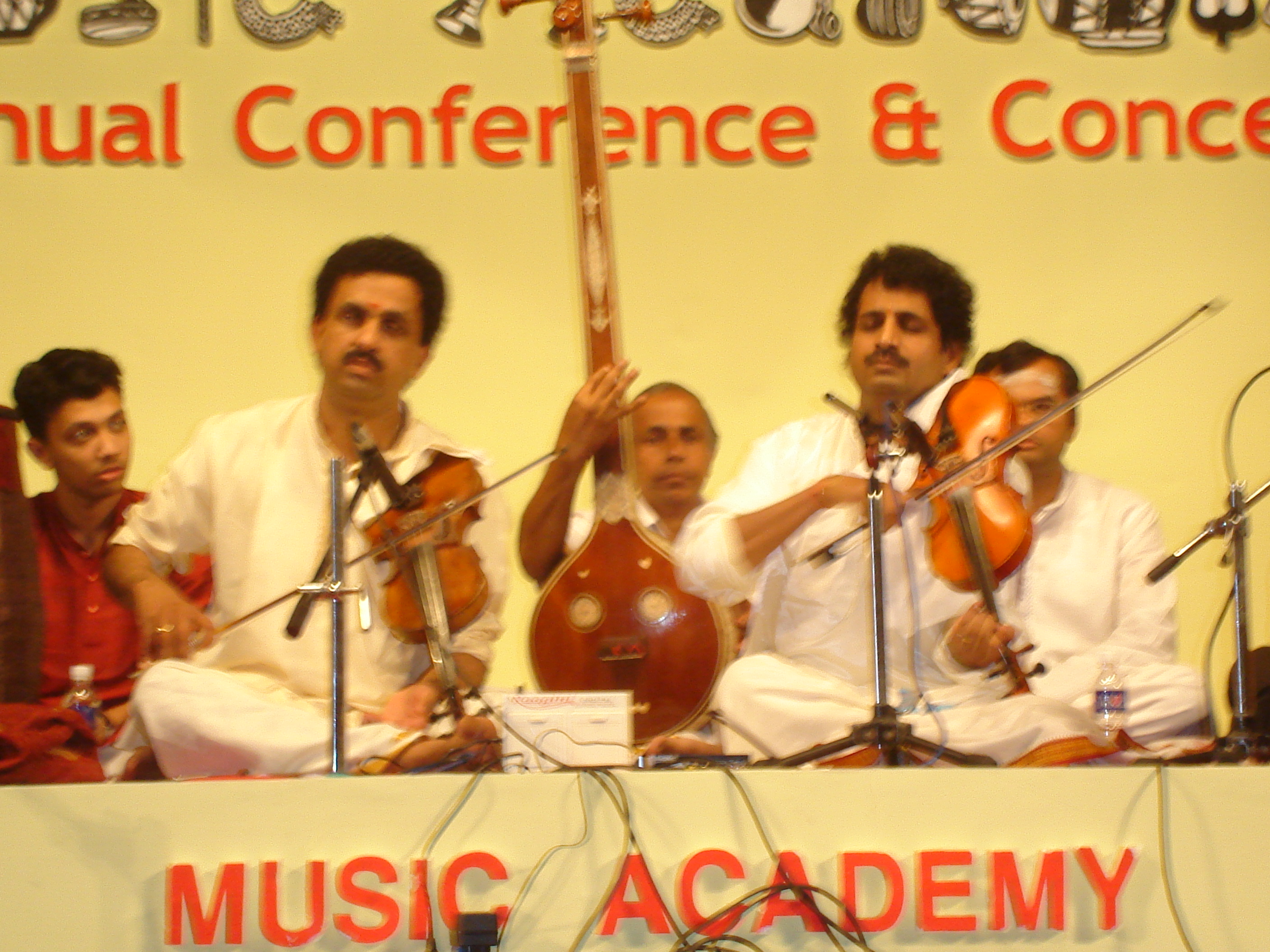

Background information
- Genre: Classical
- Occupation: Violinist duo
- Instrument: Violin

"Mysore Brothers" is an Indian classical violinist duo consisting of Mysore Nagaraj and Mysore Manjunath. They trained under their father Sri Mahadevappa, a violinist in the tradition of Sri Tyagaraja and composer of Carnatic classical music. They received the Sangeet Natak Akademi award from the Government of India in 2017.

== Notable performances ==
In 2019, The Hindu said that the brothers had "metamorphosed their prodigious talent to blossom into brand ambassadors of Indian classical music."

They have performed at the Royal Albert Hall in London, Sydney Opera House in Australia, International Violin Conference, Common Thread Music festival in United States, Federation Square in Melbourne, World Music Festival in Chicago, Oxford University, Tansen Sangith Samaroh-Gwalior, All-European Cultural festival in Leicester, Festival of India in London, SAARC summit, Royal charity Concert at Putra World Trade Centre in Kuala Lumpur before the King of Malaysia, World Music Festival in Chicago, special concert for the President of the Republic of Namibia, Power theatre in Oregon, Federation Square-Melbourne, Congregational hall in Portland. Dr. Manjunath has performed at the Esplanade Theatre in Singapore, World Music Series by BBC, Santa-Fe Festival in New Mexico, Persian Academy of Culture in Iran Doverlane Music Festival in Kolkata, India International Centre, Bozar Contemporary Music Festival in Brussels. They have collaborated with musicians and orchestras including Ned McGowan, Fabrizio Cassol, Jai Uttal, Joe Craven, Fred Hamilton, Todd Haaby, Pandith Vishwa Mohan Bhatt, Ronu Majumdar, N. Rajam, Tejendra Majumdar such as Aka Moon, Spenifex, Ictus.

== Educational and cultural activities ==
Mysore Brothers have conducted workshops, seminars and performances at a range of institutions. Mysore Manjunath was nominated as cultural ambassador of University of Mysore. Dr. Manjunath has composed many new ragas including Yaduveera Manohari, Bharatha. His creation Yoga Anthem included performances by various world musicians. At the Ganakala Parishath music conference, he was nominated as the President of the Coveted Golden Jubilee Music Conference and honored with the Ganakala Bhushana Award in 2020.
