= Mysore Manjunath =

Indian violinist

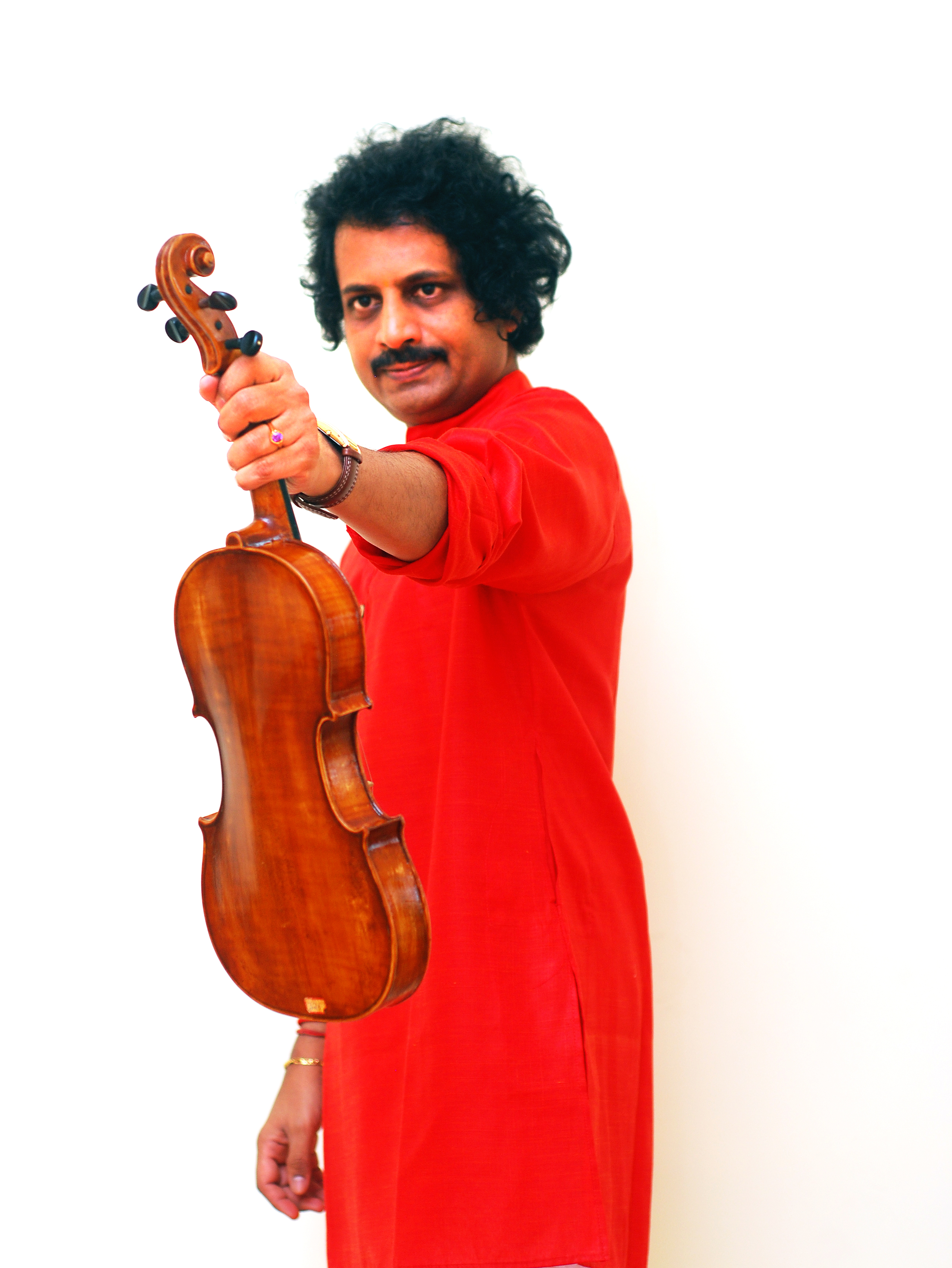
Mysore Manjunath

Mysore Manjunath (born in Mysore, India), is an Indian violinist. The son and disciple of violinist Vidwan S. Mahadevappa, Manjunath performed his first concert at the age of eight in Mysore as a child prodigy. He is one of the Mysore brothers duo. He is honored with the Sangeet Natak Akademi Award by government of India, bestowed by the president of India at the Rashtrapathi Bhavan in New Delhi.

== Education ==
Manjunath did his Master of Music at the University of Mysore securing first Rank with 4 Gold Medals and was awarded Ph.D by the University of Mysore.

== Career ==
Manjunath started performing at 8 and his initial concerts were with his father and brother. He regularly performs along with his elder brother Mysore Nagaraj. His violin concerts are featured at major international concert stages including Royal Albert Hall, Sydney Opera House, International Violin Conference, Common Thread Music festival in United States, Federation Square in Melbourne, World Music Festival in Chicago, Oxford University, Cambridge University Tansen Sangith Samaroh-Gwalior, Esplanade Theatre in Singapore, World Music Series by BBC, Santa-Fe Festival in New Mexico, Persian Academy of Culture in Iran, Doverlane Music Festival in Kolkata, Sawai Gandharv Music festival, India International Centre., Delhi International Arts Festival, University of Oregon . He has collaborated with musicians and orchestras including Ned McGowan, Fabrizio Cassol, Jai Uttal, Joe Craven, Fred Hamilton, Todd Haaby, Pandith Vishwa Mohan Bhatt, Ronu Majumdar, N. Rajam, Tejendra Majumdar such as Aka Moon, Spenifex, Ictus.

He was nominated as cultural ambassador of University of Mysore. Manjunath has created many new ragas including Yaduveera Manohari, Bharatha. His recent creation Yoga Anthem- having many popular world musicians performing in it, got nationwide recognition. "Life Again", his song created during the COVID-19 pandemic, featuring 20 eminent musicians across the globe was launched by ICCR in over 150 countries. Aaroha, a unique music play composed and directed by Manjunath, created waves as press described it as a perfect synchrony with Carnatic idioms and western presentation. At the prestigious Ganakala Parishath music conference, he was nominated as the president of the coveted Golden Jubilee Music Conference, and honored with the Ganakala Bhushana Award in 2020.

== Awards and honors ==
He is one of the youngest recipients of the Sangeet Natak Akademi award by the Government of India and the Rajyotsava Award by the Government of Karnataka. He has received the Excellence award from American Institute of World Culture, honours from the American Arts Council, Best Violinist awards from the music academy in Chennai, Best Violinist award from the Indian fine arts society, Aryabhata Award, Meritorious Award from University of Oklahoma, Samskruthi Sinchana Award, Y.T.Tatachari National Award, Sangeeth Samrat, Sangeeth Rathna, Sangitha Vidwanmani, Gana varidhi, Tantri Vadya Shiromani - Asthana Vidwan from Sri Kanchi Kamakoti Peetham, Chowdiah National Award by the music academy in Bangalore, Rotary Excellence Award, Rama Ganakalacharya, Karthik Lifetime achievement Award & Sangeetha Vedanta Dhurina
