= Continuance (Greetings from Mercury album) =

Studio album by Greetings From Mercury
- Released: June 1999
- Recorded: January 1999
- Genre: Jazz
- Length: 69:00
- Label: Carbon 7

Greetings From Mercury chronology
Greetings From Mercury (1998)	''Continuance'' (1999)	Heiwa (2002)

Continuance is a 1999 album by jazz fusion band Greetings From Mercury. It was recorded live at Vooruit, Ghent, Belgium.

== Track listing ==
1. "Hospitality"
2. "Closer"
3. "Green"
4. "Let The Children Speak"
5. "Continuance"
6. "Snakes"

== Personnel ==
- Jeroen Van Herzeele - tenor saxophone, leader
- Peter Hertmans - electric guitar and guitar synthesizer
- Otti Van Der Werf - electric bass
- Stéphane Galland - drums
- Steven Segers - rap
- Michel Andina - sitar
- Virgilio Herrera Estrada - lead singer
