= Octurn =

Belgian jazz ensemble

Octurn is a Belgian polyrhythmic jazz ensemble led by Bo Van Der Werf (baritone saxophone and clarinet). Its lineup as well as the composers are changed for every album. They always play with at least 3 saxophones and from 2002 they have been playing with two basses and two drummers.

== Members ==
Apart from the leader, Laurent Blondiau (trumpet and flugelhorn) is the only member who played on each Octurn release. Other members are, on :

- saxophone: Ben Sluijs (alto), Jeroen Van Herzeele (tenor and soprano), Bart Defoort (tenor and soprano), Guillaume Orti (alto) and Patrick Zimmerli (tenor);
- flute: Magic Malik, Ben Sluijs and Pierre Bernard;
- trombone: Ilja Reijngoud and Geoffroy De Masure;
- piano: Jozef Dumoulin, Ron Van Rossum, Kris Defoort and Fabian Fiorini;
- guitar: Nelson Veras, Jacques Pirotton, Pierre Van Dormael and Ben Monder;
- bass: Piet Verbist, Nicolas Thys, Otti Van Der Werf and Jean-Luc Lehr;
- drums: Félix Simtaine, Stéphane Galland and Chander Sardjoe;
- percussion: Michel Seba.

Toots Thielemans (harmonica) and Kenny Werner (piano) also appeared on a track.

== Discography ==
- 1996: Chromatic History
- 1997: Ocean
- 2000: Round
- 2002: The Book Of Hours
- 2002: Dimensions
