= Michel Hatzigeorgiou =

Belgian bass guitarist

Michel Hatzigeorgiou (born 1961) is a Belgian bass guitarist.

He was born in Belgium from Greek parents. He started playing bouzouki at the age of 9, then switched to electric guitar at 11 and finally to electric bass at 14. He could have or should have played with Scorpions after a quick trip to Hamburg for an audition, but his father told him to "Get your "Bac" first. He joined his first band, the Blackbirds, as lead guitarist, when he was a student at Charleroi Technical University. In 1982, he attended the jazz seminar in Liège. At that time, he played with Jaco Pastorius (his main influence), Mike Stern, and Belgian jazzmen Toots Thielemans, Ivan Paduart, Steve Houben, Philip Catherine, and Pierre Van Dormael.

He was then involved in the De Kaai project and in Nasa Na Band, precursor of Aka Moon, the band he formed with Fabrizio Cassol and Stéphane Galland. Hatzigeorgiou has been teaching at the Brussels conservatory since 1998.

His band Variations on A Love Supreme has released an album of the same name. He has also played in the Erwin Vann Group and Toots Thielemans Quartet.
