= Paula Spencer (novel) =

2006 novel by Roddy Doyle

- First edition (UK)
- Author: Roddy Doyle
- Language: English
- Publisher: Jonathan Cape (UK); Viking Press (US)
- Publication date: 2006
- Publication place: Ireland
- Media type: Print (Hardcover and Paperback)
- Pages: 288
- ISBN: 0-670-03816-4
- OCLC: 70578549
- Dewey Decimal: 823/.914 22
- LC Class: PR6054.O95 P38 2006
- Preceded by: The Woman Who Walked Into Doors

Paula Spencer is a 2006 novel by Irish writer Roddy Doyle, published in 2006.

== Plot summary ==
The novel is a sequel to Doyle's 1996 book The Woman Who Walked Into Doors, describing the life of alcoholic and battered wife Paula Spencer. The second book picks up her life ten years after the death of her husband.

A further book about the character, The Women Behind the Door, followed in 2024.
