= The Woman Who Walked into Doors =

1996 novel by Roddy Doyle

The Woman Who Walked Into Doors
- First edition
- Author: Roddy Doyle
- Language: English
- Publisher: Jonathan Cape (UK); Viking Press (US)
- Publication date: 5 April 1996
- Publication place: Ireland
- Media type: Print (Hardcover and Paperback)
- Pages: 226
- ISBN: 0-224-04272-6
- Preceded by: Family
- Followed by: Paula Spencer

The Woman Who Walked Into Doors (1996) is a novel by Irish writer Roddy Doyle. It was adapted from the 1994 RTÉ/BBC miniseries Family.

== Plot summary ==
The novel tells the struggle and survival of Paula Spencer, an abused wife who is the narrator. The title comes from an incident where Paula's husband asks her how she received a bruise he was responsible for, and she replies that she "walked into a door."

A sequel, Paula Spencer, was published in 2006. The narrative blends her recounting of the circumstances of her childhood, courtship and wedding day, with reflections on those events. The gathering drama is linked to the increasing awareness of moving towards a climax, which is on the one hand the outbreak of violence in her marriage, and on the other hand the violent death of her husband.

A further book about the character, The Women Behind the Door, followed in 2024.

== Critical reception ==
The New York Times praised "Mr. Doyle's entirely unsentimental and perfectly attuned comprehension of the real world of the Irish present." Robert Christgau wrote that Doyle "has the decency to understand that the most constrained human life is never simple, and the grace and guts to prove how unimpoverished the countless meanings of that truth can be."

The book is referenced in Claire Keegan's short story and published book, So Late in the Day.

== Adaptations ==
The Spencer family first appeared in the RTÉ/BBC TV miniseries Family in 1994.

The novel was adapted as an opera by the composer Kris Defoort and the director Guy Cassiers. It received its world premiere in November 2001 at deSingel in Antwerp, and toured extensively before being played in Dublin's Gaiety Theatre in October 2003.
