= Songs of Minutes =

Studio album by Erik Vermeulen trio
- Released: April 2001
- Recorded: April 2000
- Genre: Jazz
- Length: 46:12
- Label: De Werf

Erik Vermeulen trio chronology
Songs of Minutes (2001)	Inner City (2002)

Songs of Minutes is a 2001 album by jazz band Erik Vermeulen trio. It was recorded at the Studio Igloo (in Brussels) on April 17, 18 and 19. The album contains both original compositions and covers (from Thelonious Monk, Harold Arlen, Charlie Haden, Duke Ellington and Billy Strayhorn). It is the second release with Erik Vermeulen as a leader after Erik Vermeulen Icarus Consort's Into Pieces in 1997.

== Track listing ==
1. "Evidence" (T. Monk) – 2:59
2. "Long Time" (E. Vermeulen) – 4:39
3. "Monk's Dream" (T. Monk) – 4:39
4. "Come Rain Or Come Shine" (H. Arlen) – 7:40
5. "Three Minutes And A Half" (S. La Rocca) – 3:44
6. "Before Silence" (E. Vermeulen) – 3:31
7. "Silence" (C. Haden) – 4:11
8. "Misterioso" (T. Monk) – 5:22
9. "The Star Crossed Lovers" (D. Ellington, B. Strayhorn) – 3:13
10. "Bemscha Swing" (T. Monk) – 5:25

== Personnel ==
- Erik Vermeulen - piano
- Salvatore La Rocca - double bass
- Jan De Haas - drums, percussion
