= Michel Massot =

Belgian jazz musician

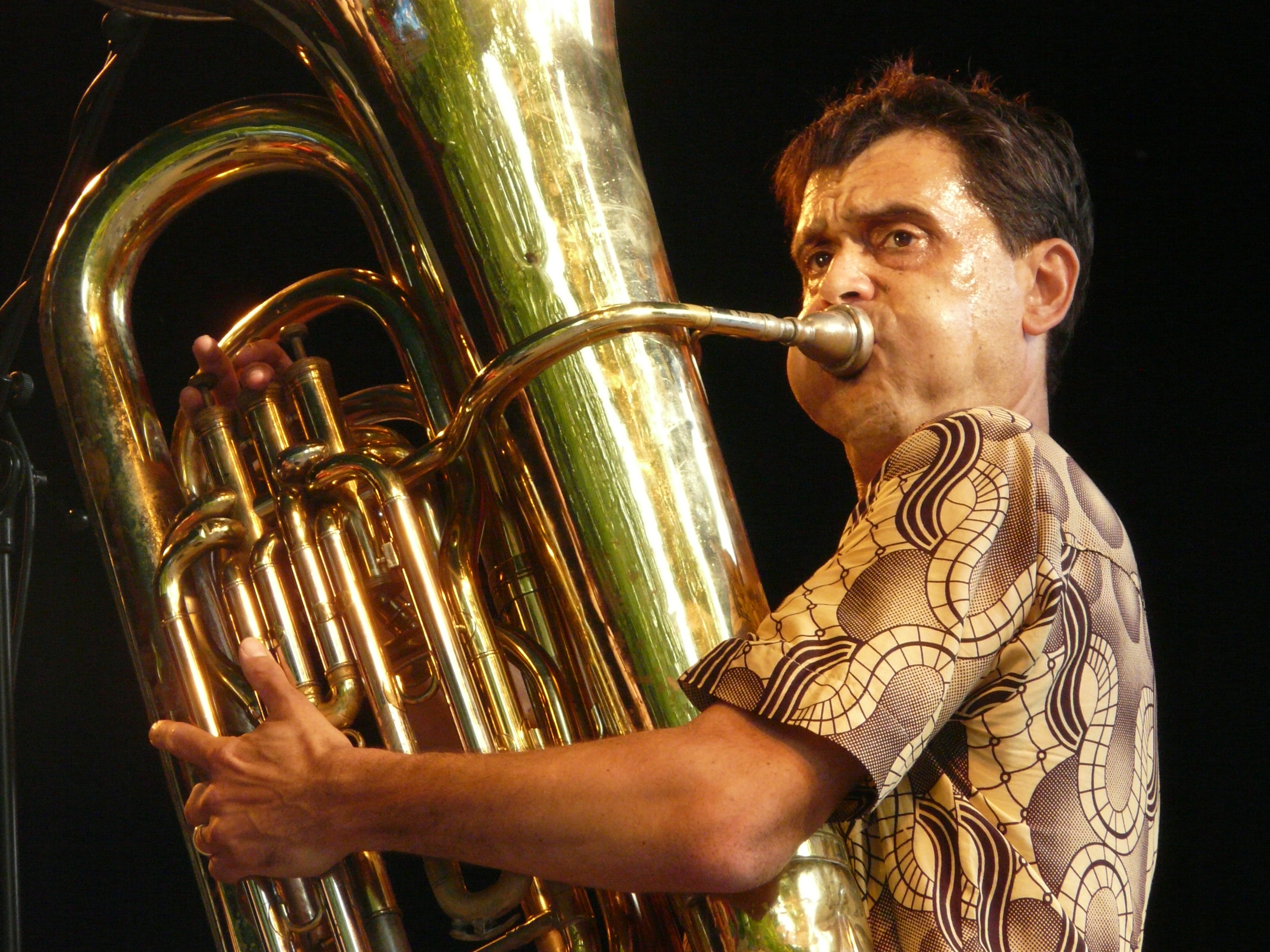
Michel Massot in Brussels, Belgium in 2010.

Michel Massot (born 25 October 1960, in Halle) is a Belgian tuba and trombone jazz musician. He studied at Conservatoire de Liège. He founded Trio Bravo with saxophonist Fabrizio Cassol and drummer Michel Debrulle in the middle of the 1980s. The band became Trio Grande in 1993 after the departure of Fabrizio Cassol, who was replaced by French saxophonist Laurent Dehors. Beside this, he also played with various musicians such as Garrett List, Henri Pousseur, Michel Hatzigeorgiou, Kris Defoort, Evan Parker and Kenny Wheeler (in the Klaus König Orchestra).

He is now a teacher at Conservatoire de Liège (one of his courses is called Chamber Rock). He also is part of the Rêve d'éléphant Orchestra septet. Next to those bands, Massot also plays in Määk's Spirit, a band that is led by Belgian trumpeter Laurent Blondiau.
