= Greetings from Mercury =

Belgian jazz fusion group

Greetings From Mercury was a Belgian jazz fusion group led by saxophonist Jeroen Van Herzeele, formed in 1998. The group included the members of the Jeroen Van Herzeele Trio, plus bassist Otti Van Der Werf, rapper Steve Segers and sound engineer/producer/sitarist Michel Andina, who recorded all their albums and played on the last two. They released their first album, Greetings From Mercury, under Van Herzeele's name.

== Members ==
- Jeroen Van Herzeele - tenor saxophone
- Peter Hertmans - guitar
- Otti Van Der Werf - bass
- Stéphane Galland - drums
- Steven Segers - rap
- Michel Andina - sitar

== Discography ==
- Greetings From Mercury (1998)
- Continuance (1999)
- Heiwa (2002)
