= Charlemagne Palestine =

American visual artist and musician (born 1947)

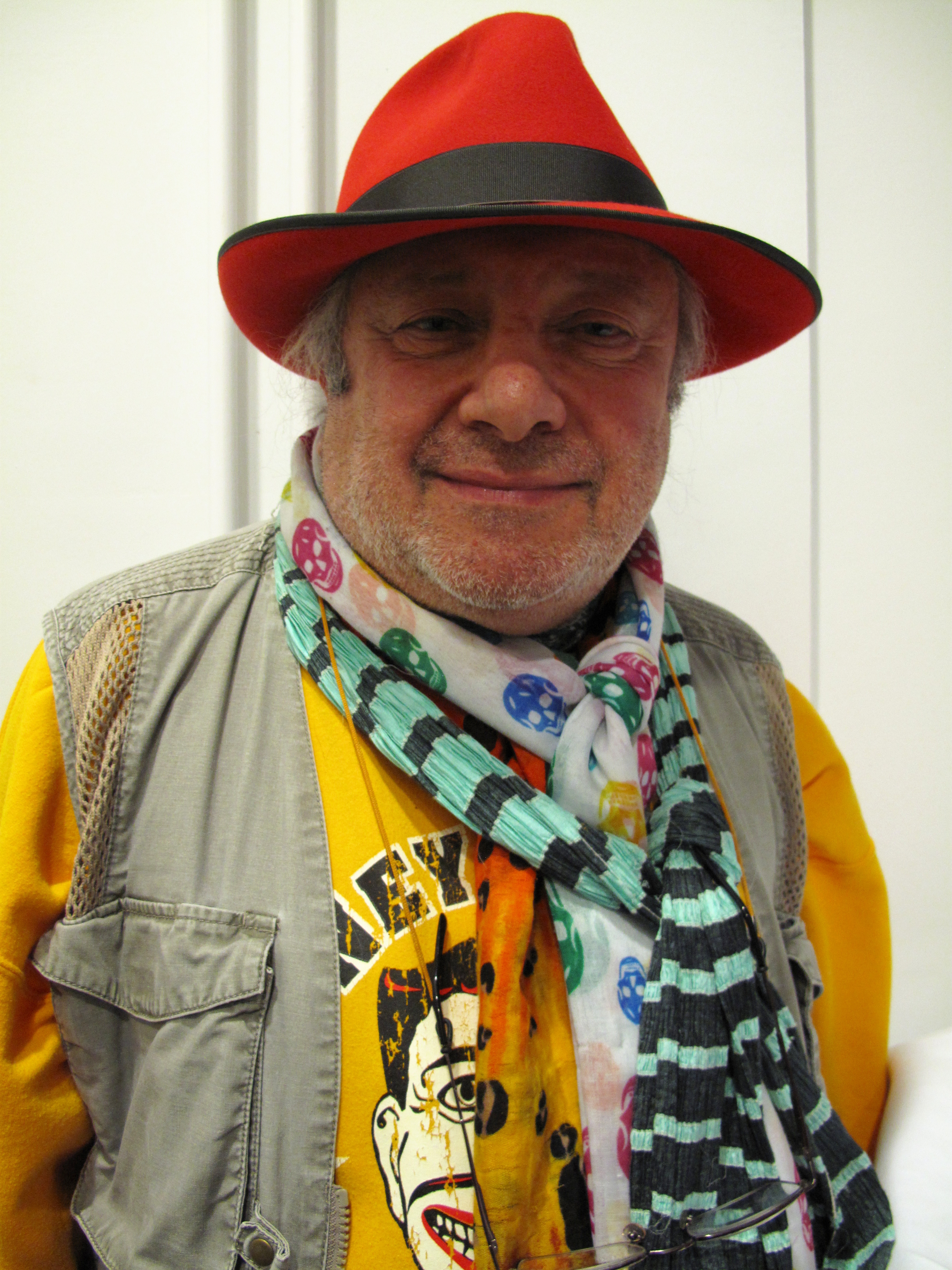
- Palestine at De Appel, Amsterdam, February 2014

Background information
- Born: Chaim Moshe Tzadik Palestine; August 15, 1947 (age 79)
- Origin: Brooklyn, New York City, U.S.
- Genres: Maximalism Minimalist; Experimental; Visual art
- Occupation: Musical performance artist / Visual artist
- Instruments: Vocals, piano, organ, harmonium, spoken word
- Label: Table of the Elements
- Website: Official website

Chaim Moshe Tzadik Palestine (born August 15, 1945 or 1947), known professionally as Charlemagne Palestine, is an American visual artist and musician. He has been described as being one of the founders of New York school of minimalist music, first initiated by La Monte Young, Terry Riley, Steve Reich, Philip Glass and Phil Niblock, although he prefers to call himself a maximalist.

== Formational years ==
Born in Brooklyn, New York, Palestine began by singing sacred Jewish music and studying accordion and piano. At the age of 12 he started playing backup conga and bongo drum for Allen Ginsberg, Gregory Corso, Kenneth Anger, and Tiny Tim. From 1962 to 1969, Palestine was carillonneur for the Saint Thomas Episcopal Church in Manhattan, eventually creating a piece that consisted of 1,500 15-minute performances.

From 1968 to 1972, Palestine studied vocal interpretation with Pandit Pran Nath, experimented on kinetic light sculptures with Len Lye, composed music for Tony and Beverly Conrad’s film Coming Attractions, taught at CalArts with Morton Subotnick, created the sound and movement piece Illuminations with Simone Forti, and developed his own alternative synthesizer: the Spectral Continuum Drone Machine.

Throughout the seventies Palestine created records, videos, sculptural objects, abstract expressionist visual scores, and performed long piano concerts regularly in his loft on North Moore Street in Tribeca in the company of his bevy of stuffed animals. From 1980 to 1995, Palestine performed only rarely, exhibiting instead at Stedelijk Museum, Amsterdam; the Moderna Museet, Stockholm; and in documenta 8. During that time, he also founded the Ethnology Cinema Project in New York, which is dedicated to preserving films that document disappearing traditional cultures.

After moving to Europe in 1995, he settled in Brussels. In addition to creating exhibitions, Palestine performs regularly, releasing new and re-releasing older material and developing new videos and sonic projects.

== Selected discography: solo works ==
- Body Music 1973
- "Strumming Music". Shandar, 1974.
- Karenina. 2 CDs. Solo performance with Indian harmonium and falsetto voice, rec. March 1997 in Paris. London: World Serpent Distribution.
- Schlingen-Blängen. Solo performance for organ. US: New World Records, 1999.
- Four Manifestations on Six Elements. Solo pieces for piano and for electronics. Belgium: Barooni Records.
- Godbear. Solo pieces for piano. Belgium: Barooni Records.
- Strumming Music. Solo piece for piano. Felmay, San Germano, Italy, 1995; reissue of New Tone recording nt6742
- Three Compositions for Machines. Staalplaat, 1997.
- Schlongo!!!daLUVdrone. Organ of Corti, 2000.
- Jamaica Heinekens in Brooklyn. Piece for found sound and electronic drones. Belgium: Barooni Records.
- Alloy. Alga Marghen, 2000.
- Continuous Sound Forms. Alga Marghen, 2000.
- Charlemagne at Sonnabend. 2 CDs. CP, 2001.
- Music for Big Ears. Staalplaat, 2001.
- In Mid-Air. Alga Marghen, 2003.
- Old Souls Wearing New Clothes. VPRO, 2003.
- A Sweet Quasimodo between Black Vampire Butterflies: For Maybeck. Cold Blue, 2007.
- The Apocalypse Will Blossom. Yesmissolga, 2008.
- Voice Studies. LP only. Alga Marghen, 2008.
- From Etudes to Cataclysms. 2 CDs. Sub Rosa, 2008.
- "Relationship Studies". LP. Algha Marghen, 2010.
- "Two Electronic Sonorities". LP. Algha Marghen, 2012.

== Selected discography: collaborations ==
- Charlemagne Palestine and Pan Sonic. Mort aux vaches. Staalplaat, 2000.
- Charlemagne Palestine, David Coulter and Jean Marie Mathoul. Maximin. Young God Records, 2002.
- Charlemagne Palestine, David Coulter, Michael Gira and Jean Marie Mathoul. Gantse Mishpuchach / Music in Three Parts. Fringes Recordings, 2004.
- Charlemagne Palestine and Tony Conrad. An Aural Symbiotic Mystery. Sub Rosa, 2006.
- Charlemagne Palestine, Terry Jennings, Tony Conrad, Robert Feldman, Rhys Chatham. Sharing a Sonority. Alga Marghen, 2008.
- Charlemagne Palestine and Christoph Heemann. Saiten in Flammen. Streamline, 2009.
- Charlemagne Palestine and Janek Schaefer. Day of the Demons. Desire Path Recordings, 2012.
- Charlemagne Palestine and Rhys Chatham Youuu + Mee = Weee. Sub Rosa, 2014.
- Charlemagne Palestine and Seppe Gebruers Beyondddddd The Notessssss. Konnekt, 2025.

== Art exhibitions ==
Charlemagne Palestine, who has long incorporated bears and plush toys into his performances, created the art installation Bear Mitzvah in Meshugahland at The Jewish Museum in New York City in 2017.

== Bibliography ==
- Johnson, Tom (1989). The Voice of New Music: New York City 1972–1982: A Collection of Articles Originally Published by the Village Voice. Eindhoven, Netherlands: Het Apollohuis. ISBN 90-71638-09-X.
- Palestine, Charlemagne (2004). Sacred Bordello. Book with CD. Milan: Alga Marghen.
- Voegelin, Salome. Listening to Noise and Silence: Towards a Philosophy of Sound Art. London: Continuum. 2010. Chapter 2 Noise, pp. 50–52.
