= Kris Defoort =

Belgian jazz pianist and composer

Kris Defoort is a Belgian avant-garde jazz pianist and composer. He is the brother of the famous Wim "Dj Willie", "the living pop encyclopedia" Defoort, Belgian saxophonist Bart Defoort and Koen Defoort.

== Early life ==
Kris Defoort was born in Bruges, Belgium. His brother is saxophonist and composer Bart Defoort.

In 1978, he entered the conservatory in Antwerp to study early music and recorder. He graduated four years later, and then decided to study contemporary music and jazz at the Liège conservatory. Frederic Rzewski, Henri Pousseur and Garrett List were among his teachers.

== Career ==
In 1986, Defoort released his first recording with his quintet Diva Smiles. The next year, he went to New York to study at Long Island University, Brooklyn. He recorded there with Vincent Herring and Jack DeJohnette.

On his return in 1991, he founded his own ensemble named K.D.'s Pretty Big Basement Party. The following year, he recorded the first CD for De Werf label (based in Bruges) with K. D.'s Basement Party. They toured in France, Belgium and the Netherlands in 1991 and then released a CD called "Sketches of Belgium" the next year, a reference to Miles Davis's "Sketches of Spain". The album, the first edited by De Werf, included an instrumental cover of Sting's Roxanne as well as two songs written by Thelonious Monk. In 1995, Defoort composed (with Fabrizio Cassol) the Variations on a Love Supreme. Defoort took part in the Octurn project in 1996 (he had already composed their 1994 album) and began to play with Mark Turner. A year later he recorded with Aka Moon on Elohim. He then formed a new ensemble (Dreamtime). He also has his own quartet with Mark Turner (tenor saxophone), Nicolas Thys (bass guitar and double bass) and Jim Black (drums).

He also teaches at the Brussels conservatory.

== Opera and music-theatre ==
In 1998, Defoort became a composer-in-residence at LOD, a production company specialising in contemporary music theatre in Ghent. His first work for them was the dance piece Passages with Fatou Traoré, premiered in 2001.

His first opera, created in collaboration with director Guy Cassiers was The Woman Who Walked into Doors, after the novel of the same name by Roddy Doyle. It premiered in November 2001 at deSingel in Ghent, before a very successful tour of Belgium, the Netherlands, Luxembourg, and the Festival d'Automne in Paris, the Musica festival in Strasbourg and the Ruhrtriennale in Germany. In October 2003, there were three performances in Dublin (the setting of the novel), at the Gaiety Theatre. Defoort split the orchestration between his own Dreamtime jazz ensemble and the classical Beethoven Academy (the Prometheus Ensemble in later performances). On the stage, the role of the main character, Paula Spencer, was also split between the soprano Claron McFadden and the actress Jacqueline Blom, with all other characters being represented by pre-recorded video and projected texts.

In 2003, Defoort worked again with McFadden and Dreamtime in ConVerSations/ConSerVations, a project to synthesise Renaissance and contemporary music.

His second opera, again with Cassiers, was The House of Sleeping Beauties based on the eponymous novella by Yasunari Kawabata. It received its world premiere at La Monnaie, in May 2009, as part of the Kunstenfestivaldesarts, before touring the Netherlands, Belgium, Luxembourg and France. The lead character of Eguchi was split between an actor and a baritone. The old man visits a brothel to lie alongside the bodies of anaesthetized young women, to reflect on the poignant passage of time, the process of ageing and death. Defoort emphasises the emotional differences between the unreal, timeless floating world inside the brothel and the mundane world outside, by using only sung voice inside, and only spoken voice outside.

The Brodsky Concerts, premiered in Geneva in September 2010, pairs the poetry of the Russian Nobel prize winner Joseph Brodsky, recited by Roofthooft, with improvisations at the piano from Kris Defoort to express "that which is impossible to say with words".

The Aix-en-Provence Festival commissioned an opera from Defoort and the Canadian writer/ director Wajdi Mouawad for the 2013 festival.

== Bands ==
He leads (or led):

- Diva Smiles
- K. D.'s Basement Party
- K. D.'s Decade
- Variations on a Love Supreme
- Kris Defoort's Dreamtime
- Kris Defoort quartet
- Kris Defoort trio

He has recorded as a member of:

- Garrett List Ensemble
- Deep in the Deep
- Octurn
