= Peer Baierlein =

German musician and composer

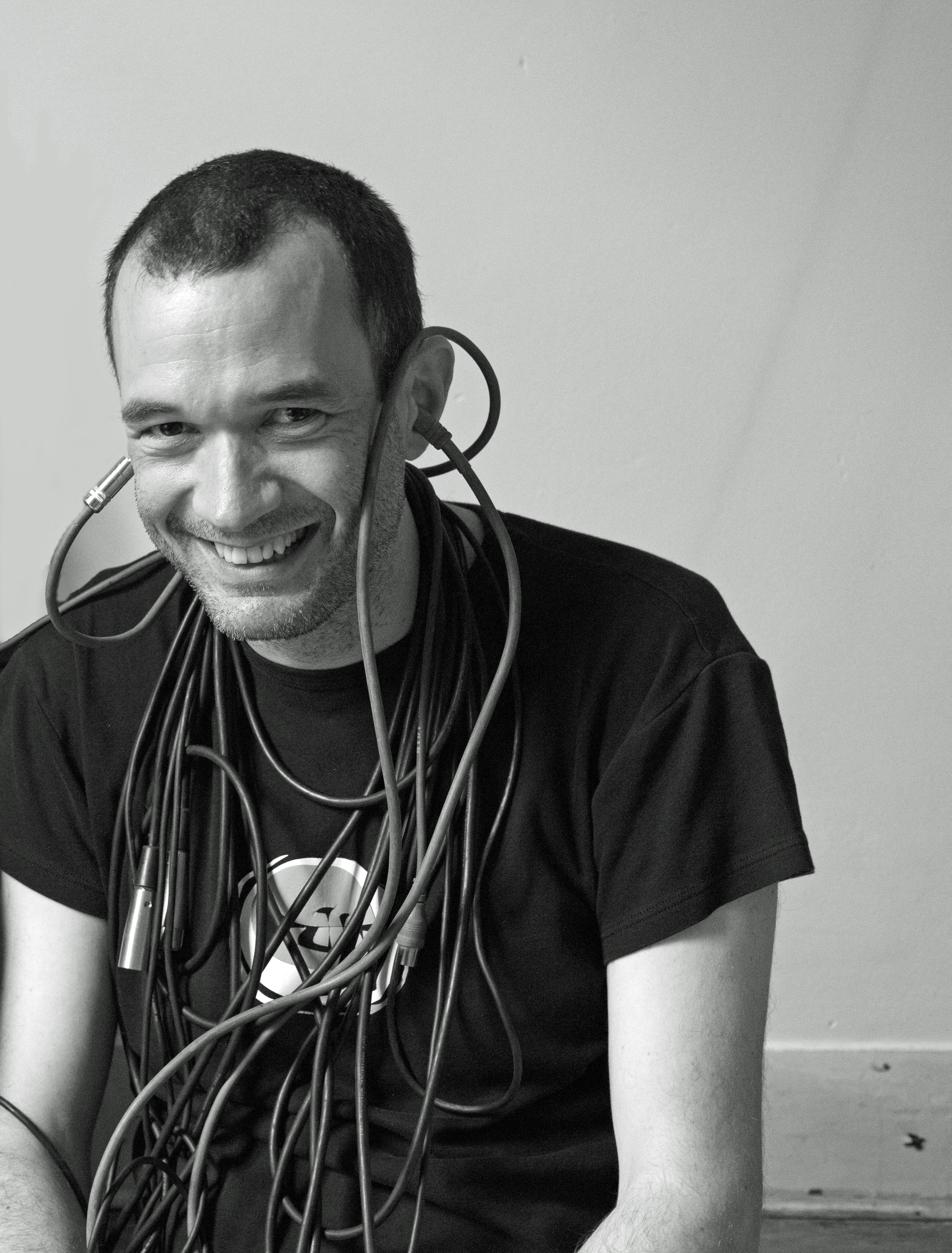
Peer Baierlein

Peer Baierlein (born 16 May 1972 in Stuttgart, West Germany) is a German musician and composer.

== Biography ==
Peer Baierlein started playing the accordion at the age of 7 and then switched to the trumpet when he was 9. After several years in the local brass band he started his professional studies at the early age of 16 at the Musikhochschule Köln in Germany. He first became a classical trumpet teacher before beginning his studies with Prof. Malte Burba as an orchestra musician at the Musikhochschule Köln and with Arno Lange at the 'Deutsche Oper' in Berlin. In 1996, he moved to Leuven in Belgium to study with his favourite jazz-trumpet player Bert Joris at the Lemmensinstituut. Upon completion of his studies, he moved for a year to New York City in 2000, to take lessons fromm John McNeil and to play his instrument abroad. He then came back to Belgium, where he finished his studies for jazz trumpet and then specialised as ‘lead-trumpet’, also at the Lemmensinstituut. Between 2005 and 2007, Peer Baierlein has been studying classical composition with Piet Swerts. He continued his studies from 2008 to 2011 and followed a special education for composing film music and classical orchestration with a.o. Denis Pousseur, Victor Kissine and Jean-Luc Fafchamps. From 2011 to 2013, he was a student for 'new media' at the 'Hochschule für Musik und Theater' in Hamburg.

Since 2007 he has been working as a composer, musical director and musician for numerous theaters in Germany, Switzerland and Austria. Productions for which he composed all of the music have won all theatre, director and actor awards in German-speaking countries.

Since 2016, Peer Baierlein has been composing for classical orchestra, vocal and instrumental ensembles.

The first commissioned works for the 'Hessische Staatsballett' under the direction of Tim Plegge and the 'Mecklenburgisches Staatsballett' ("Ballet X Schwerin") under the direction of Xenia Wiest will follow in 2022.

== Discography ==
- 2004: Issues
- 2006: Open Questions
- 2009: Cycles
- 2015: One
- 2015: me² + 1

== Works / Classical Compositions ==
- 2016: 'Concerto No.1' (double concerto for trumpet, trombone and orchestra)
- 2016: '255' (double concerto for marimba, vibraphone and orchestra)
- 2017: Seelen-Trilogie ('Black Soul','Yellow Soul','Purple Soul' - for orchestra, voice and rockband)
- 2018: Hymnus (for orchestra, organ, 3 choirs, rockband and church bells)
- 2020: In Der Tiefe (Concerto for DoubleChoir a Capella)
- 2021: Ode an die Pop-Musik (contemporary compositions based on pop-music motives for nonett and double bass)
- 2021: Pentagon of Poetry (5 works for vocal-ensemble with lyrics by Goethe, Nietzsche and Lenau.
- 2022: 'Hymnus an die Musiek' - for Double-Quartet-VocalEnsemble
- 2023: The Little Prince for orchestra
- 2023: 'SaHaHaKral' & 'Daheim' (2 works for SATB vocal-ensemble)
- 2024: 'Davids Bündler' for orchestra
- 2024: L'appel du vide¹ (Concerto for Double Choir a Cappella)
- 2025: A Glimpse of Schwitters (for SSATB Vocal Ensemble)
- 2025: Times and Ages (for SSATB Vocal Ensemble, 2 Bass Viols, Theorbo, Harpsichord & Percussion)
- 2025: Somnambul (for Percussion Trio)
- 2026: Kol Echad - one voice - (for soprano, organ, 2 choirs & chamber orchestra)
- 2026: La Cabalgata del Diablo (for solo marimba)
- 2026: Second Nature (for Alto Sax, Violoncello & Marimba)

== Opera ==
- 2012: Remixes for Manon from Jules Massenet (Regie: Silvana Schröder / Musical Director: Leo Siberski) / Opera Kiel)
- 2017: additional compositions for Der Freischütz / Carl Maria von Weber / Eutiner Festspiele / Musical Director: Leo Siberski

== Publications ==
- 2017/18: Pyotr Ilyich Tchaikovsky 'Kinderalbum' op.39 / adaptation for string ensemble' (Universal Edition)

== Orchestrations ==
- 2018: orchestrations of Johann Sebastian Bach, Robert Schumann, Edvard Grieg, Claude Debussy, Georges Bizet, Johannes Brahms, Joseph Haydn and Bedřich Smetana for clarinet, bassoon, violin, bass, trumpet, trombone and percussion
- 2021: Different orchestrations for the 'WDR Funkhausorchester'
- 2023: 2 Saxon Christmas songs for 'AuditivVokal' for 8-part SATB vocal ensemble
- 2024/25: Hommage para Luiz for classical orchestra

== Scholarships ==
- 2024/25: Scholarship of the "Roger Willemsen Foundation" in the mare-artist-house

== Dance ==
- 2021: Memento (Choreography: Tim Plegge) / 'Hessisches Staatsballett'
- 2022: Remember The Ladies (Choreography: Xenia Wiest) / 'Mecklenburgisches Staatsballett'
- The Little Prince (New adaption / Choreography: Xenia Wiest) / 'Mecklenburgisches Staatsballett' / 'Mecklenburgische Staatskapelle'

== Radio Play ==
- 2014: Quotenkiller / (Producer: Klaus-Michael Klingsporn) / Deutschlandradio
