= Baba Sissoko =

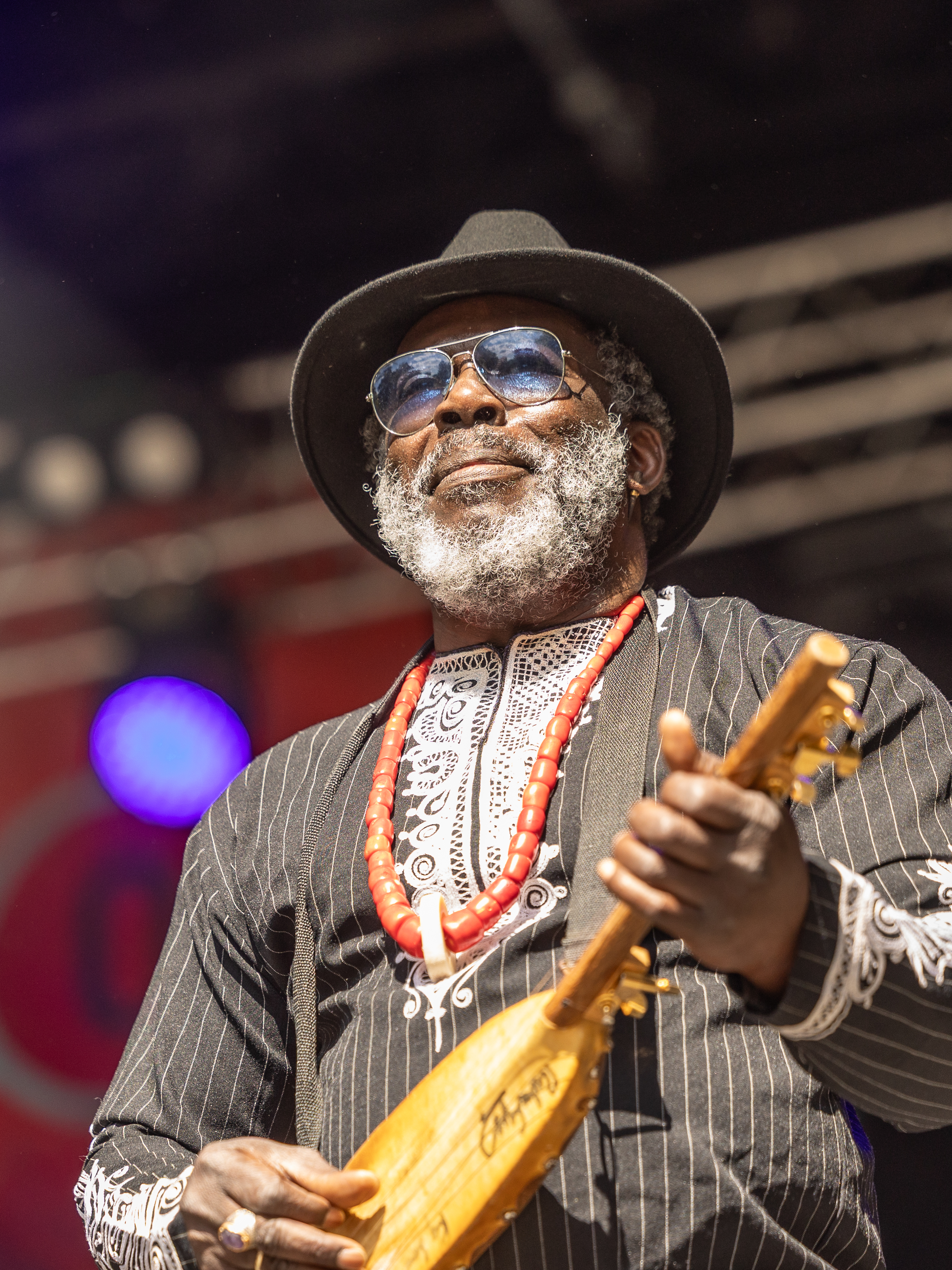

Background information
- Born: 8 March 1963 (age 63); Bamako, Mali
- Occupation: Musician
- Instrument: Percussion
- Website: babasissoko.com

Baba Sissoko (born 8 March 1963) is a Malian percussionist.

== Career ==
Born and raised in Bamako, Mali, from childhood, he played tamani, often accompanying the traditional female griot during wedding and other traditional ceremonies.

In 1985, he toured internationally with the prestigious Instrumental Ensemble of Mali orchestra, playing the tamani and ngoni. In 1991, he founded his trio, Baba Sissoko & Taman Kan, and began extensively collaborating with top Malian artists and international musicians. His work with Habib Koité is notable as their collaboration lasted 12 years and was widely celebrated. In 1995, Baba Sissoko released his first album with Tama-Kan.

Baba Sissoko's Taman Kan bandmates are Roger Sabal Lecco (who has played bass with Manu Dibango, Miriam Makeba, Fela Kuti, Francis Bebey, Lucio Dalla, and Louisiana Red), and Reynaldo Hernandez (who has played percussion with the Conjunto Folklórico Nacional of Cuba and the Gipsy Kings). The trio celebrates their own cultures (Manding, Bambara people, Sonrai, Yoruba, and Kongo), and incorporates blues, jazz and rock elements as well.

To date, Baba Sissoko has recorded and released more than five albums. He also has taught traditional drum in Brussels, Belgium, and led conferences for the University of Calabria - Art, Music, and Spectacle Centre in Italy. He has lived in Italy since the late 1990s.

In 2015 he collaborated with DJ Khalab on the Khalab & Baba album.

In 2017, he collaborated with Mighty Mo Rodgers on the album, Griot Blues.

== Discography ==
- Baba Sissoko & Taman Kan, Taman Kan, 1995
- Djana, 1999
- Baba Sissoko & Taman Kan, Live in Studio, 2000
- Baba Sissoko and Mario Artese, Griots, 2001
- Djeliya, 2004
- Baba Sissoko with Famoudou Don Moye & Maurizio Capone, Folk Bass Spirit Suite, 2004
- Baba Sissoko Trio, Bolokan, 2005
- Afro Jazz Live, 2005
- Baba Sissoko & Taman Kan, Mali Music, 2005
- Djekafo, 2006
- Baba Sissoko with Eloi Baudimont (Fanfare et Choeur), Mali Mali, 2007
- Baba Sissoko Jazz Ensemble, Bamako Jazz, 2007
- Bibisa Solo – Moi je m'amuse, 2008
- Aka Moon, Baba Sissoko & Black Machine, Culture Griot, 2009
- Baba Sissoko e Il Pozzo di San Patrizio, The Eyes over the World, 2010
- Baba Sissoko Buschwerk & The Masters of Groove, Trance, 2011
- Mali Tamani Revolution, 2011
- Sahel, 2011
- Baba Sissoko, Officina Zoé, Taranta nera, 2012
- Baba Sissoko Afroblues, African Griot Groove, 2012
- Baba Sissoko Djeli Mah Damba Koroba, Baba et sa maman, 2013
- Baba Sissoko, Saulius Petreikis, Indre Jurgeleviciute, Laurita Peleniute, Viktoras Diawara, Ma Lituanie, 2013
- Tchi Wara, 2014
- Baba Sissoko with Antonello Salis & Famoudou Don Moye, Jazz (R)Evolution, 2015
- Three Gees, 2015
- Baba Sissoko with Mighty Mo Rodgers, Griot Blues, 2017
- Amadran, 2019
- Ballake Sissoko and Baba Sissoko, Sissoko & Sissoko, 2019

=== As guest ===
(Incomplete)

- Art Ensemble of Chicago, We Are On the Edge (Pi, 2019)
