= Aka Moon =

Belgian jazz band

- Origin: Belgium
- Genres: Jazz, world
- Years active: 1992 – present
- Labels: Carbon 7, Cypres, W.E.R.F. Records, Outhere Records
- Members: Fabrizio Cassol; Michel Hatzigeorgiou; Stéphane Galland
- Website: http://www.akamoon.be

Aka Moon is the Belgian jazz trio of saxophonist Fabrizio Cassol, bassist Michel Hatzigeorgiou and drummer Stéphane Galland. Aka Moon combines jazz, rock, and world music. In Real Time (2001) was composed for ballet company of Anne-Teresa De Keersmaeker Rosas.

== Discography ==
On Carbon 7 Records:

- Aka Moon (1992)
- Nzomba (1992)
- Rebirth (1994)
- Akasha Vol. 1 (1995)
- Akasha Vol. 2 (1995)
- Ganesh (1997)
- Elohim (1997)
- Live at Vooruit (1998)
- Live at the Kaai (1999)
- Invisible Mother (1999)
- Invisible Sun (2000)
- In Real Time (2001)
- Invisible Moon (2001)

On De W.E.R.F. Records:

- Guitars (De Werf, 2002)

On Cypres Records:

- Amazir (2006)
- Culture Griot (2009) with Baba Sissoko & Black Machine
- Aka Moon + DJ Grazzoppa's DJ Bigband (2010)
- Unison (2012)

On Outhere Records:

- Double Live: Aka Balkan Moon & AlefBa (2015)
- The Scarlatti Book (2015) with Fabian Fiorini
- Nasa Na (2015) with Pierre Van Dormael
- Constellations Box (2017)
- NOW (2018)
- Opus 111 (2020)
