= Jeroen Van Herzeele =

Belgian jazz saxophonist

Jeroen Van Herzeele (born 13 September 1965) is a Belgian jazz saxophonist. He was born in Zottegem. He has played in various bands, including among others Greetings From Mercury, Maak's Spirit, and Octurn. In 1999, he won the Belgian Golden Django for best Flemish artist.

In 2025 the jazz duo Jeroen van Herzeele & Stéphane Galland released the electronic dub album Songshan via the Dutch label Challenge Records International.
