= Nicolas Thys =

Belgian bassist

- Born: 27 August 1968 (age 57); Brussels, Belgium
- Occupation: bassist

Nicolas Thys (born 27 August 1968) is a Belgian bassist. He graduated in 1994 from the Hilversum Conservatory (in the Netherlands), where he also taught bass and double bass. Thys took private lessons with Dave Holland, Marc Helias and Marc Johnson. He received several awards, most notably the Golden Django award for best young talent in 2001. Thys performed live with Toots Thielemans, Garrett List, Judy Niemack, Mark Turner, Jeanfrançois Prins, Ivan Paduart, Kris Defoort, Kenny Werner, and Mike Stern. He released his first CD with his band Alice's 5 Moons in 1997.

== Bands ==
He recorded with:

- K.D.'s Decade
- Félix Simtaine
- Tomas & Co
- Brussels Jazz Orchestra
- Bart Defoort Quartet
- Kris Defoort Quartet
- Octurn
- Jason Seizer
- Bill Carrothers
