= Jozef Dumoulin =

Belgian jazz musician and composer

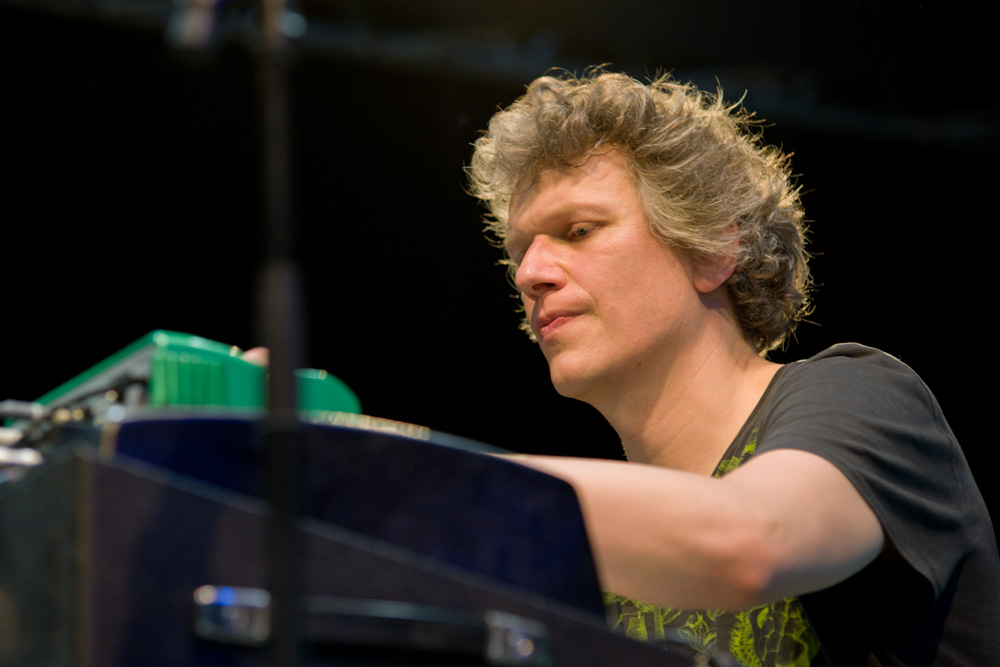
- Dumoulin at the Moers Festival, 2012

Background information
- Born: 27 April 1975 (age 51); Ingelmunster, Belgium
- Genres: Jazz
- Occupations: Musician, composer
- Instruments: Fender Rhodes, keyboards, piano
- Years active: Late 1990s–present
- Website: jozefdumoulin.com

Jozef Dumoulin (born 27 April 1975) is a Belgian jazz musician and composer. He plays Fender Rhodes, keyboards and piano.

== Early life ==
Dumoulin was born in Ingelmunster, in rural Belgium. He became interested in jazz in his late teens after hearing Keith Jarrett and Kenny Kirkland. He initially played the piano, but owned a Fender Rhodes while studying jazz in Cologne in his early twenties.

== Later life and career ==
After his studies, Dumoulin got a regular job in Antwerp and began using the Fender Rhodes in preference to the poor quality piano that the venue possessed. From then, he began experimenting with the sounds that it could make and how they could be altered using effects.

In 2011 and 2013 Dumoulin recorded with the sextet Bureau of Atomic Tourism.

Dumoulin recorded a wholly improvised solo Fender Rhodes album that was released in 2014. Commenting on his preference for improvisation at that stage, he commented that "Maybe one day I'll be able to write music bringing more things together, but for now I know that the best way to get in a zone is through improvisation." His 2015 album Trust was credited to The Red Hill Orchestra, but this consisted of Dumoulin (mainly Fender Rhodes), Ellery Eskelin (tenor sax) and Dan Weiss (drums). This contained Dumoulin's "spindly, shape-shifting post-bop compositions, where extended passages of free improvisation and quicksilver give-and-take connect groove-heavy themes."

== Discography ==
An asterisk (*) indicates that the year is that of release.

=== As leader/co-leader ===
| Year recorded | Title | Label | Personnel/Notes |
|---|---|---|---|
| 2001* | Eclipse | Mogno | Co-led with Barbara Wiernik (vocals); some tracks duo, some tracks trio, with Hugo Read (alto sax, soprano sax) or Ramesh Shotham (percussion) added; one track quartet |
| 2009* | Trees Are Always Right | Bee Jazz | With Lynn Cassiers (vocals, effects), Bo Van Der Werf (baritone sax, EWI, effects), Eric Thielemans (drums, effects) |
| 2011* | Rainbow Body | Bee Jazz | Trio, with Trevor Dunn (electric bass), Eric Thielemans (drums) |
| 2014* | A Fender Rhodes Solo | Bee Jazz | Solo Fender Rhodes |
| 2015* | Trust | Yolk | Trio, with Ellery Eskelin (tenor sax), Dan Weiss (drums) |
| 2015* | What Lies in the Sea | Sub Rosa | As Lilly Joel; duo, co-led with Lynn Cassiers (vocals) |
| 2016* | The Miracles of Only One Thing | Sub Rosa | Trio, co-led with Keiji Haino (guitar, voice, flute, percussion), Teun Verbruggen (drums, electronics) |
| 2017* | Evergreens | | Duo, co-led with Benoît Delbecq (piano, electronics) |
| 2018* | A Beginner's Guide to Diving and Flying | Yolk | With Orca Noise Unit; quintet, with Sylvaine Hélary (flutes), Antonin Tri Hoang (alto sax, clarinets, percussion), Bruno Chevillon (bass), Toma Gouband (percussion) |
| 2018* | Eden | | With The Bureau of Atomic Tourism; sextet, with Jon Irabagon (saxophone), Magnus Broo (trumpet), Julien Desprez (guitar), Ingebrigt Häker Flaten (bass), Teun Verbruggen (drums) |

=== As sideman ===
| Year recorded | Leader | Title | Label |
|---|---|---|---|
| 2011 | Bureau of Atomic Tourism | Scintigraphy | Rat |
| 2012* | Jerome Sabbagh | Plugged In | Bee Jazz |
| 2013 | Bureau of Atomic Tourism | Spinning Jenny | Rat |
