= Fabrizio Cassol =

Belgian saxophonist and aulochrome player

- Born: 8 June 1964 (age 60); Ougrée, Belgium
- Genres: Chamber, jazz
- Occupation(s): Musician, composer
- Instrument(s): Saxophone, aulochrome
- Years active: 1985-present
- Website: www.fabriziocassol.com

Fabrizio Cassol (born 8 June 1964) is a Belgian saxophonist and the first user of the aulochrome (a double-reed instrument).

He was born in Ougrée, Belgium. Between 1982 and 1985, he studied at the Liège conservatory and "obtained first prize for saxophone while majoring in chamber music". He also studied improvisation and composition. Cassol began to tour with his first band (Trio Bravo, with Michel Massot and Michel Debrulle). He travelled to the Central African forest to encounter the Aka pygmies, which led to the formation of the band Aka Moon. Besides, he has performed with many other musicians.

He has composed music for dance theatre and in 1995 he composed with Kris Defoort the album Variations on A Love Supreme. He won the Belgian Golden Django in 1998. Since September 2002, he has used the aulochrome, a new instrument created by François Louis. He has taught at the Etterbeek music academy since 1989. Cassol collaborated with choreographer Alain Platel to create "Requiem pour L", in which musicians and dancers "perform a new version of Mozart’s Requiem while slow-motion footage of a woman dying is projected on a screen behind them".
