= Stéphane Galland =

Belgian jazz drummer and composer

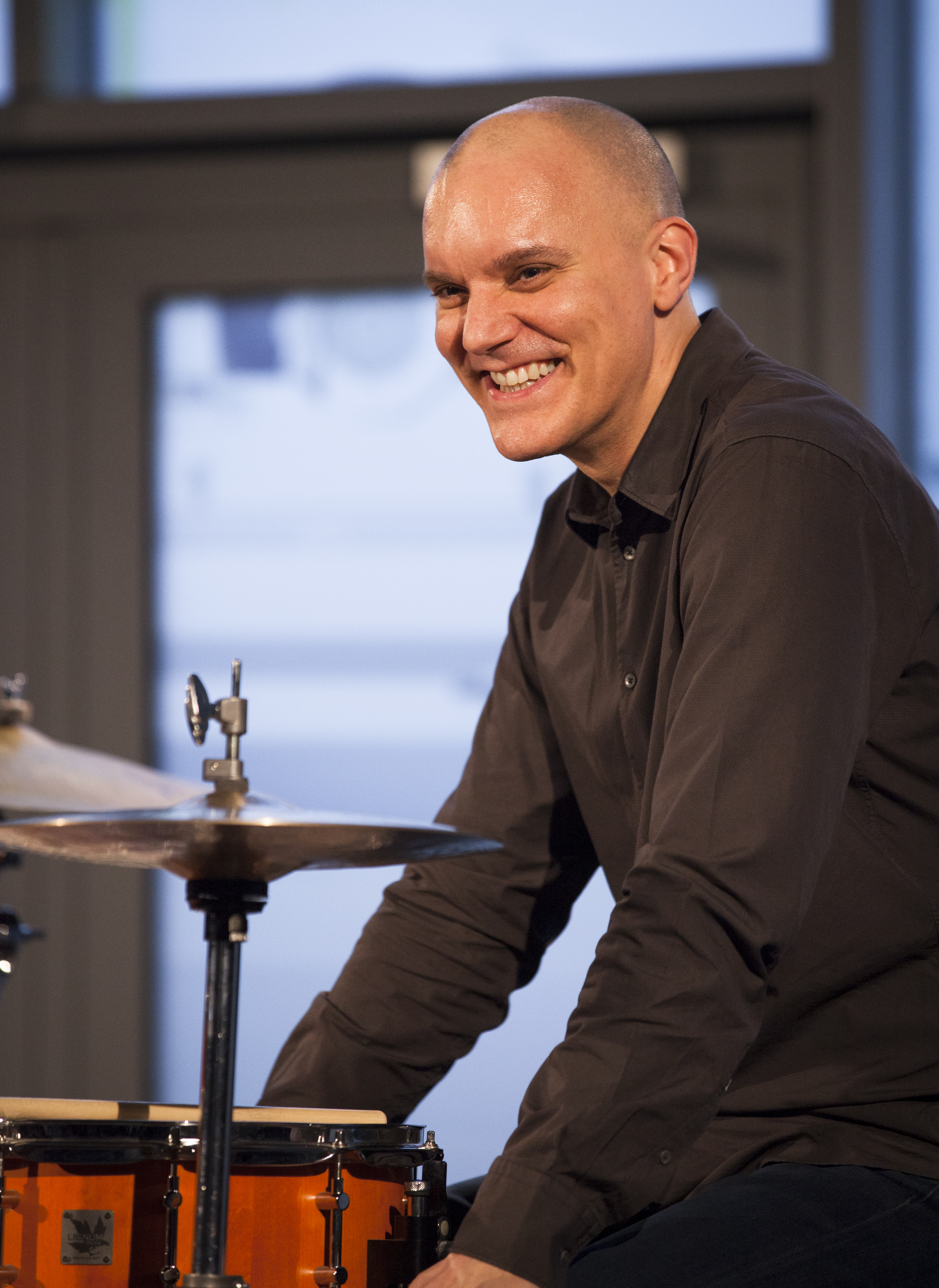
- Belgian jazz drummer Stéphane Galland in action

Background information
- Born: 27 October 1969 (age 56)
- Genres: Jazz, avant-garde, fusion
- Occupation: Musician
- Instrument: Drums
- Labels: Outnote Records, alter-nativ, Bee Jazz, Challenge Records International

Stéphane Galland (born 27 October 1969) is a Belgian jazz drummer and composer.

In 2018, the international jazz project called SHIJIN (with Stéphane Galland, saxophonist Jacques Schwarz-Bart, pianist Malcolm Braff, and bassist Laurent David) released their eponymous record SHIJIN on French independent record label alter-nativ.

In 2025 the jazz duo Jeroen van Herzeele & Stéphane Galland released the electronic dub album Songshan via the Dutch label Challenge Records International.
