= Lokerse Feesten =

Music festival in Lokeren, Belgium

Coordinates: 51°6′25″N 3°59′29″E

- Genre: Alternative rock, rock, indie rock, pop, hip hop, heavy metal, electronic music, dance music
- Locations: Grote Kaai, Lokeren, Belgium
- Years active: 1975–2019, 2020-present
- Capacity: 15,000
- Website: Festival Website

The Lokerse Feesten (English: Lokeren Feasts) is a music festival organized annually in Lokeren, Belgium.

== History ==
The first edition took place on 2, 4 and 6 August 1975. It is now a ten-day festival, with four to eight artists performing on the main stage daily. Theme days include metal days, dance music days or days with Dutch-language artists from Flanders and the Netherlands only.

The festival hosts up to 125,000 visitors each year.

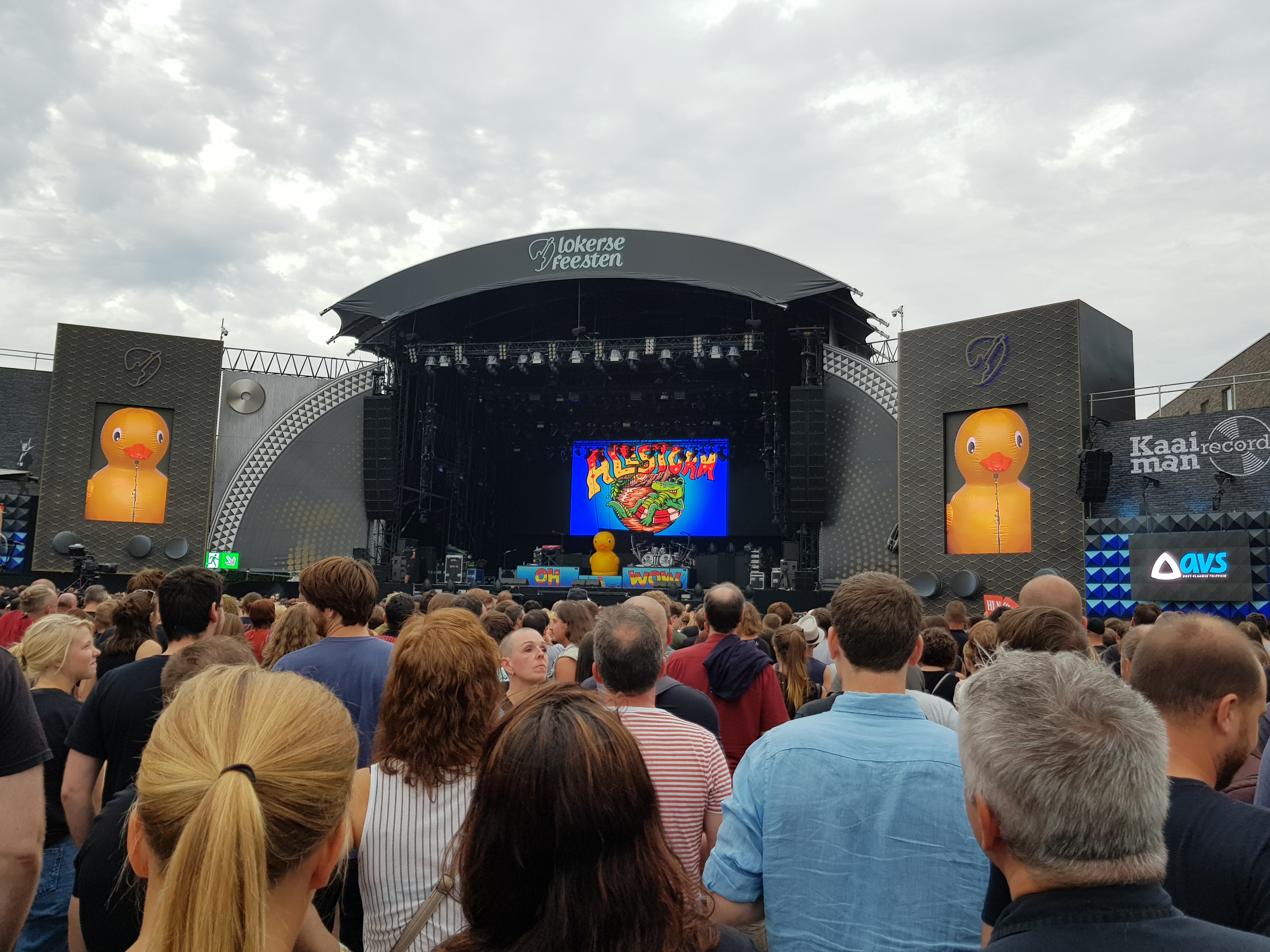
Alestorm stage set at Lokerse Feesten in 2019

In recent editions, international artists like Neil Young, P!nk, The Beach Boys, Van Morrison, Iggy Pop, Black Eyed Peas, Snoop Dogg, Morrissey, Tori Amos and Blur headlined the Lokerse Feesten.

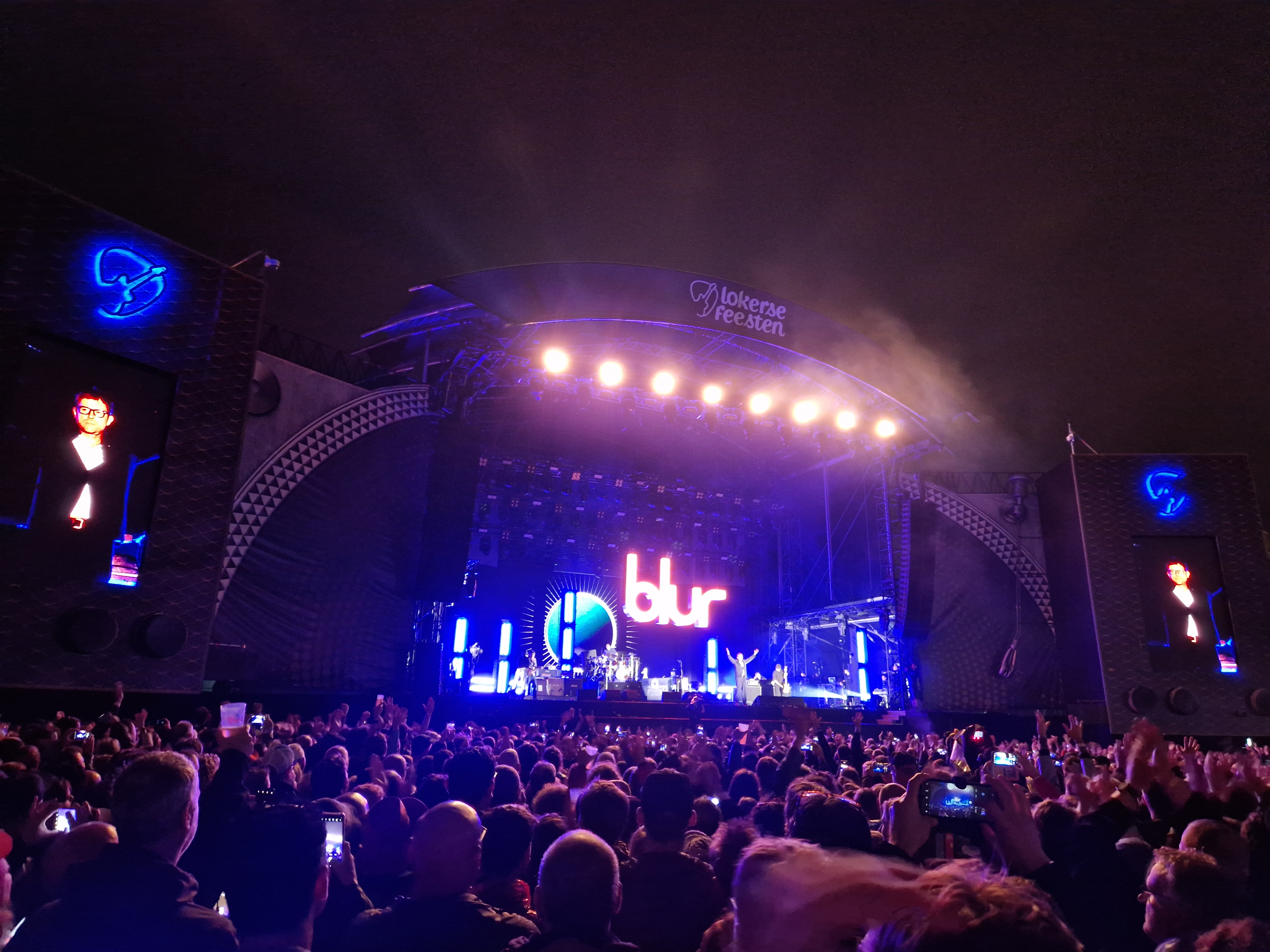
Blur at the 2023 Lokerse Feesten

Locally, the name "Lokerse Feesten" has also become a collective term for all activities within those 10 days in the city centre of Lokeren.

== Key moments ==
=== 1994: Split-off ===
In 1994, the music festival moved to another location (Grote Kaai) and it became a paying event. A part of the organizers disagreed these decisions, and since then, a free music festival Fonnefeesten takes place in Lokeren during the same period of the Lokerse Feesten. In the past, it headlined famous artists like Billy Ocean, 10cc, Level 42, Axelle Red, The Supremes, The Three Degrees and Starsailor.

=== 2000s: Switch to "theme days" ===
Towards the end of the 90s, groups of all kinds were programmed on 1 day, with the intention of attracting as many people as possible. Gradually, there was a switch to theme days. The more expensive ticket prices made it possible to attract international groups. Peter Daeninck, programmer Lokerse Feesten: "On 10 days we can take all directions: from the sing-alongs of Metejoor to the Megadeth metal. Although the concept also has a downside. If we want a hip-hop day, it will only work if there are enough artists on tour."

=== 2011: Morrissey performance and meat ban ===
In 2011, the Lokerse Feesten became world news, and the appearance of British artist Morrissey had everything to do with it. Morrissey, a convinced vegan, had stepped out of the stage during an earlier performance after he had smelled the scent of hamburgers. The organizers decided not to take the risk, and not to sell meat that evening. The traditional Lokeren horse sausage had to make way for the headliner.

Although this decision had been made by the organization, the news spread that Morrissey himself forbade the meat.

=== 2018:Thunderstorm ===
In 2018, the festival was halted by severe thunderstorms. The torrential downpour quickly flooded the stage. The band Triggerfinger wanted to continue playing, but the organizers deemed it extremely dangerous and decided to stop the performance.

=== 2025: 50th anniversary ===
From April 2025, an exhibition "50 Years of Lokerse Feesten - from Neighborhood Party to Icon" runs in the Lokeren city museum, recording the five decades of music history, city experience and festival highlights.

== Editions ==
1975	Toots Thielemans, Horace Parlan, Eddie "Lockjaw" Davis, Walter De Buck
1976	Sammy Rimington, Clark Terry, Wim De Craene, Johan Verminnen, Roland and the Blues Workshop
1977	Wannes Van de Velde, Roland and the Blues Workshop, Zjef Vanuytsel, Kris De Bruyne, Eddy Wally, Raymond van het Groenewoud
1978	Clark Terry, Ferre Grignard, Zangeres Zonder Naam, Gruppo Sportivo, Raymond van het Groenewoud, Roland Van Campenhout, Margriet Eshuijs
1979	John Renbourn, Roger Guérin, Raymond van het Groenewoud en the Centimeters, John Massis, Walter De Buck, Zjef Vanuytsel, Bots
1980	Alexis Korner, Tommy Tucker, The Pebbles, Rocco Granata, Black Slate, Kevin Coyne, Johan Verminnen
1981	Jan Akkerman + Pleasure Point, Wim De Craene, Jo Lemaire & Flouze, Johan Verminnen, Roland Van Campenhout
1982	The Sound, Jack Walrath Kwintet, Charel Janssens & Co Flower
1983	Jacques Raymond, Nicole Seibert, Johan Verminnen & Roland Van Campenhout, Jo Leemans, De Kreuners
1984	Jan Akkerman Trio, Samantha, Willy Sommers, TC Matic, Nacht und Nebel, Wannes Van de Velde, Jo Lemaire, Arbeid Adelt!, Roland & His Blues Workshop & Louisiana Red
1985	Raymond van het Groenewoud & band, La Esterella, Conny Vandenbos & kwartet, Luc Van Acker & band
1986	Dana Gillespie, Pasadena Roof Orchestra, The Kids, The Ramblers, Ruby Turner, Johan Verminnen & Tars Lootens, Claw Boys Claw, Tröckener Kecks
1987	Raymond van het Groenewoud, Soulsister, Johan Verminnen, Ramses Shaffy & Liesbeth List, Maurane, Pierre Rapsat, Dana Gillespie
1988	John P. Hammond, Herman Brood and his Wild Romance, Jr. Walker & The All Stars, Dr. Feelgood, Soulsister, Isabelle Antena, Bart Peeters en De Radio's, Brendan Croker & The 5 O'Clock Shadows
1989	Gil Scott-Heron, Andy Sheppard, Soulsister, The Radios, Dr. Feelgood, 3 Mustaphas 3, Tabu Ley Rochereau, Toumani Diabaté & Nianadi, Clouseau, Raymond van het Groenewoud & de Vlaamse Mustapha's, The Scabs, Blue Blot, Roland & friends, The Scene
1990	The Flying Pickets, Toots Thielemans, Wreckless Eric, Arno, Johan Verminnen, De Kreuners, Clouseau, Rob Hoeke's Boogie & Blues Band, Pierre Rapsat, The Scabs, Noordkaap
1991	Rufus Thomas, Blue Blot, Leyers, Michiels & Soulsister, Jo Lemaire, Raymond van het Groenewoud & de Vlaamse Mustapha's, Oumou Sangaré
1992	Katrina and the Waves, X-Legged Sally, Khadja Nin, Rowwen Hèze, Charles et les Lulus, The Radios, Adrian Borland & The Citizens, Stef Bos & band, Hallo Venray
1993	Townes Van Zandt, Roger Chapman & The Shortlist, Leon Redbone, Loudon Wainwright III, Leyers, Michiels & Soulsister, Riders on the Storm, Brendan Croker & The Serious Offenders, Betty Goes Green, Bram Vermeulen, Kris De Bruyne
1994	Vic Chesnutt & Band, Beverly Jo Scott, The Choice, Raymond van het Groenewoud, Noordkaap, Rowwen Hèze, Axelle Red
1995	Tom Robinson Band, Khadja Nin, The Fabulous Thunderbirds, Doug Sahm & The Last Real Texas Blues Band, Roy Ayers & Ubiquity, Soulsister, The Clement Peerens Explosition
1996	The Stranglers, Tom Robinson, John Cale & The Soldier String Quartet, Ann Peebles, Dick Dale, Jimmy LaFave & The Night Tribe, Noordkaap, The Kids, Raymond van het Groenewoud, The Ramblers, De Mens
1997	De La Soul, Katrina and the Waves, Doug Sahm & The Last Real Texas Blues Band, Nick Lowe, The Gourds, Axelle Red, Lee "Scratch" Perry & The Robotiks, CJ Bolland, The Skatalites, Bart Peeters en de Moeilijkheden, Machiavel
1998	Sugarhill Gang, The Wailers, Right Said Fred, Lloyd Cole, Luka Bloom, Taj Mahal, DAAU, Habib Koité & Bamada, Gorki, The Neon Judgement, Charles & the White Trash European Blues Connection, Van Dik Hout, Raymond van het Groenewoud & de Straffe Mannen, Evil Superstars, Paul Michiels en the Big M's
1999	The Wailers, Dr. John, Richard Thompson, The Blind Boys of Alabama, Femi Kuti & The Positive Force, Clouseau, De Mens, Loudon Wainwright III, Ilse DeLange, Gorki, Soulwax, Arid, Dave Angel, DAAN, Arno, Björn Again, Hooverphonic, Will Tura, The Clement Peerens Explosition
2000	Bob Geldof, Luka Bloom, Kid Creole and the Coconuts, Marc Almond, Kirsty MacColl, Aswad, The Paladins, Heideroosjes, Hothouse Flowers, An Pierlé, Nits, Starflam, Zap Mama, Arid, Postmen, Das Pop
2001	Kelis, Robert Plant & Strange Sensation, Frank Black & The Catholics, Fischer-Z, Praga Khan, Bomfunk MC's, Roland Gift, De Mens, Das Pop, Maceo Parker, Zita Swoon, Mauro, Luke Slater, Hooverphonic, Rob de Nijs
2002	The Orb, Billy Bragg, Echo & The Bunnymen, The Waterboys, Therapy?, Kosheen, The Human League, Millionaire, Laïs, Vive La Fête, Flip Kowlier, Clouseau, Arid, Zornik, Gorki, Boudewijn de Groot, Buscemi
2003	Joe Jackson Band, Chic feat. Nile Rodgers, Willy DeVille & Band, Fun Lovin' Criminals, Sananda Maitreya, Burning Spear, Killing Joke, Asian Dub Foundation, Calexico, Ian McCulloch, 2 Many DJs, Praga Khan, Arsenal, Levellers, Scala & Kolacny Brothers, De Kreuners, 't Hof van Commerce, Anouk, Admiral Freebee, Das Pop, Ozark Henry, Vive La Fête, Boudewijn de Groot
2004	Simple Minds, Brian Wilson, Paul Weller, Europe, Lamb, Jools Holland and his Rhythm & Blues, Axelle Red, Heideroosjes, Krezip, Zornik, Front 242, Hothouse Flowers, Zap Mama, Hooverphonic, Novastar, Mauro Pawlowski & The Grooms, Roland met Witloof & Coconut
2005	Iggy & The Stooges, Patti Smith and her Band, The Cure, The Sisters of Mercy, Sean Paul, Starsailor, Michael Franti & Spearhead, Jimmy Cliff, Natalie Imbruglia, Cranes, Mercury Rev, The Brand New Heavies, Triggerfinger, Millionaire, Magnus, Sam Bettens, Vive La Fête, Admiral Freebee, Clouseau, Gabriel Rios
2006	Texas, Jackson Browne & David Lindley, Madness, Jamiroquai, The Cramps, Angie Stone, Paul Weller, Heather Nova, Therapy?, Charlatans, The Waterboys, Presidents of the United States of America, Fun Lovin' Criminals, Praga Khan, Within Temptation, The Rasmus, Armand van Helden, Stereo MC's, Flogging Molly, A Brand
2007	Pet Shop Boys, P!nk, Bryan Ferry, The Prodigy, The Game, Suzanne Vega, Kosheen, Kelis, Snoop Dogg, Shameboy, Heideroosjes, The Lemonheads, The Pogues, The Magic Numbers, Garland Jeffreys, Prince Buster, Hooverphonic, Clouseau, Zita Swoon, Arno, Gabriel Rios, The Van Jets
2008	N*E*R*D, Grace Jones, Massive Attack, Sonic Youth, Sex Pistols, Sinéad O'Connor, The New York Dolls, Daniel Lanois, Status Quo, Buzzcocks, Siouxsie, Macy Gray, Supergrass, Buffalo Tom, Shameboy, Alanis Morissette, The Australian Pink Floyd Show, The Scabs, Felix da Housecat, The Storys, Das Pop, Milk Inc., Triggerfinger, The Kids
2009	Donna Summer, Fatboy Slim, David Byrne, Los Lobos, Ray Davies, Manic Street Preachers, Ultravox, Simple Minds, Pete Doherty, Cypress Hill, Primal Scream, Arsenal, Alain Clark, The Hickey Underworld, A Brand, Starsailor, Ozark Henry, Novastar, The Subs, De Jeugd van Tegenwoordig, Etienne de Crécy, Orbital, The Black Box Revelation, The Hives, Digitalism, Das Pop, Anouk, The Scabs, Bart Peeters, Lady Linn & Her Magnificent Seven
2010	Roxy Music, The Cranberries, M.I.A., Paul Weller, Babyshambles, The Sisters of Mercy, The Dandy Warhols, Air, Alice Cooper, Anthrax, Papa Roach, Life of Agony, Mötley Crüe, Wu-Tang Clan, Public Enemy, Rye Rye, Dizzee Rascal, Gang of Four, Leftfield, The Human League, Vaya Con Dios, Therapy?, Golden Earring, Dinosaur Jr., The Horrors, Absynthe Minded, Martin Solveig, The Opposites, Flip Kowlier, Admiral Freebee, Arsenal, The Black Box Revelation, Arid, K's Choice, Selah Sue, DAAN
2011	Joe Cocker, Roger Daltrey, Morrissey, Kelis, Robert Plant & The Band Of Joy, Scissor Sisters, Sister Bliss, Primal Scream, O.M.D., Thin Lizzy, The Datsuns, Channel Zero, Dream Theater, Soulfly, Jamie Lidell, Erykah Badu, Selah Sue, Mix Master Mike, Airbourne, Kyuss Lives!, Triggerfinger, Bart Peeters, Ozark Henry, The Heartbreaks, Balthazar, Gogol Bordello, 2 Many DJs, North Mississippi Allstars, Gabriel Rios, Paolo Nutini, Sharon Jones & the Dap-Kings / Interpol / Arsenal, Lady Linn & Her Magnificent Seven, Hooverphonic, Das Pop, Goose, DAAN
2012	Beach Boys, Bryan Ferry, Echo & The Bunnymen, Suede, Röyksopp, New Order, Gorillaz Sound System, UB40, P.I.L., The Specials, Machine Head, Saxon, In Flames, Ministry, Orbital, The Roots, Marco Borsato, The Magician, 't Hof van Commerce, Selah Sue, Damian Marley, Arid, Milow, Intergalactic Lovers, Absynthe Minded, Arsenal, De Mens, The Australian Pink Floyd Show, School is Cool, Black Box Revelation, Luc Van Acker, The Charlatans, Trentemøller, Kraantje Pappie, dEUS, The Subs, Zombie Nation live, Gers Pardoel, Regi
2013	Iggy & The Stooges, Cee Lo Green, The B-52's, Ugly Kid Joe, Snoop Lion, Texas, Killing Joke, Alice Cooper, Deep Purple, Sabaton, Monster Magnet, Fear Factory, Trivium, Tinie Tempah, Danzig w/ Doyle, The Opposites, Far East Movement, The Fratellis, Primal Scream, Seasick Steve, White Lies, Yellowcard, Arno, Damien Rice, Balthazar, Netsky, Pendulum, Rizzle Kicks, Pitbull, Donavon Frankenreiter, SOJA, Axelle Red, SX, Anvil, Enter Shikari, Creature with the Atom Brain, Ozark Henry, DAAN, Coely, The Subs, Compact Disk Dummies, Magnus
2014	Neil Young & Crazy Horse, Blink-182, Patti Smith and her Band, 50 Cent, Pet Shop Boys, Motörhead, Fatboy Slim, Amy Macdonald, Johnny Marr, Miles Kane, KRS-One, Emilliana Torrini, Mix Master Mike, The Wailers, Sean Paul, Lady Linn, Hooverphonic, Intergalactic Lovers, De Jeugd Van Tegenwoordig, The Opposites, Magnus, New Model Army, Example, Channel Zero, Down, Within Temptation, Dimmu Borgir, Devin Trownsend Project, Lonely The Brave, Twin Atlantic, Millencolin, The Sore Losers, Emily's Army, Jessie J, Triggerfinger, The Bony King Of Nowhere, Girls in Hawaii, Admiral Freebee, Novastar, Oscar and the Wolf, Nero, The Subs, Gabriel Rios, Arsenal
2015	Tom Jones, Kaiser Chiefs, Status Quo, Chic ft. Nile Rodgers, Robert Plant and The Sensational Space Shifters, The Kooks, Mika, Tori Amos, Oscar and the Wolf, Raving George, Giorgio Moroder, Mark Lanegan Band, Rob Zombie, Soulfly, Martin Solveig, Belle and Sebastian, Janez Detd., The Bootleg Beatles, Clouseau, Marco Borsato, Milow, Skindred, Channel Zero, Black Label Society, dEUS, Stuff., Rae Morris, Etienne de Crécy, Leftfield, Goose, Trentemøller, Tourist LeMC, Songhoy Blues, Stephen Marley, Arsenal, The Van Jets
2016	Van Morrison, Garbage, Neil Finn, Limp Bizkit, Slayer, Suicidal Tendencies, Richard Ashcroft, Christine and the Queens, House of Pain, Fat Freddy’s Drop, Maxi Jazz, Faithless, Parkway Drive, Red Fang, Steel Panther, Trixie Whitley, Zornik, Arno, Kitty, Daisy & Lewis, Balthazar, Magnus, The Sore Losers, Selah Sue, Alice on the Roof, Tinie Tempah, Hooverphonic, K3, Tourist LeMC, Emma Bale, G-Eazy, Lost Frequencies
2017	Pixies, Lil Wayne, Alice Cooper, Marilyn Manson, Megadeth, Madness, The Offspring, Mark Ronson, Charlotte de Witte, Air, Leftfield, Ben Harper, Craig David, Tom Odell, Doe Maar, Jamie Lidell, The Black Box Revelation, Fischer-Z, Millionaire, Anouk, Apocalyptica, Max & Iggor Cavalera, The Amity Affliction, Fleddy Melculy, Tamino, Less Than Jake, Pennywise, Sublime with Rome, Ronnie Flex, Oscar and the Wolf, School is Cool, J. Bernardt, Arsenal, Emma Bale, Lost Frequencies, Anne-Marie
2018	Simple Minds, Judas Priest, Chase & Status, Gary Numan, The Pretenders, Bad Religion, The Prodigy, Kasabian, Manic Street Preachers, dEUS, Front 242, Die Antwoord, Dropkick Murphys, Suicidal Tendencies, The Living End, Turbonegro, deadmau5, Soulwax, Triggerfinger, Warhaus, 't Hof van Commerce, Jasper Steverlinck, Arsenal, Novastar, Clouseau, Niels Destadsbader, Magnus, Bart Peeters, At the Gates, Diablo Blvd, Gojira, Hatebreed, Steel Panther, blackwave., Clean Bandit, Lil’ Kleine, Sevn Alias, Zara Larsson
2019	Scorpions, The Chemical Brothers, Róisín Murphy, Life of Agony, Patti Smith, Keane, Charlotte Gainsbourg, Father John Misty, The Offspring, Europe, The Damned, Christine and the Queens, Roméo Elvis, Charlotte de Witte, Trixie Whitley, NOFX, Therapy?, Marky Ramone’s Blitzkrieg, Alestorm, Zeal & Ardor, Brutus, Oscar and the Wolf, GOOSE, Famke Louise, Gers Pardoel, Marco Borsato, Gabriel Ríos, Novastar, Regi, Niels Destadsbader, Heideroosjes, SX, Tourist LeMC, Tiga, Arno, Triggerfinger, Arsenal, Bizzey, Glints, Kodaline, Clouseau, De Kreuners, Jones & Stephenson, The Van Jets
2020	No edition due to the COVID-19 pandemic
2021	No edition due to the COVID-19 pandemic
2022	Black Eyed Peas, Kraftwerk, Judas Priest, Kings of Leon, The Vaccines, Seasick Steve, Snow Patrol, The Afghan Whigs, Damian Marley, At the Gates, Kreator, Lamb of God, Brutus, 't Hof van Commerce, Booka Shade, Coely, Emma Bale, Froukje, Anti-Flag, Flogging Molly, Heideroosjes, The Interrupters, Admiral Freebee, blackwave., Glints, 2manydjs, The Subs, Charlotte Adigéry & Bolis Pupul, Sylvie Kreusch, C. J. Bolland, Regi, K3, The Clement Peerens Explosition
2023	Blur, Cypress Hill, Megadeth, Placebo, Skunk Anansie, Wilco, Bullet for My Valentine, Within Temptation, Baxter Dury, Siouxsie, Pennywise, Cypress Hill, Sylvie Kreusch, Balthazar, Pommelien Thijs, Bart Peeters & de Ideale Mannen, Anouk, K's Choice, Arsenal
2024	Pixies, Massive Attack, Chris Isaak, Richard Ashcroft, Richard Hawley, De La Soul, The Prodigy, Nas, Future Islands, Korn, The Roots, Phoenix, Clouseau, Regi, Pommelien Thijs, Compact Disk Dummies, Vive la Fête, The Selecter, The Damned, The Sisters Of Mercy, Front 242, Novastar, Paul Kalkbrenner, Trentemøller, Oscar and the Wolf
2025	The Smashing Pumpkins, Iggy Pop, Amber Broos, Kygo, Pet Shop Boys, Soulwax, Brutus, Electric Callboy, The Undertones, The Damned, Sex Pistols feat. Frank Carter, Helmet, Melvins, Amenra, Gojira, Eefje de Visser, Warhaus, Sylvie Kreusch, Air, dEUS, 't Hof van Commerce, Noordkaap, De Mens, Clouseau
2026	Snelle, Clean Bandit, Kygo, Amber Broos, Daan (band), Arsenal, Pet Shop Boys, Soulwax, Bizkit Park, {{Psychonaut}}, Enter Shikari, Brutus,Electric Callboy, Pendulum, The Undertones, The Damned, Iggy Pop, Sex Pistols, Helmet, Melvins, Amenra, Gojira, J. Bernardt, Eefje de Visser, Warhaus, Bicep, Zaho de Sagazan, Sylvie Kreusch, Air, Deus, Metal Molly], DIIV,The Haunted Youth , The Smashing Pumpkins, Goose, #likeme, Liam and No Direction, 't Hof van Commerce, Brihang, Goldband, Sean Paul, Glintsal, De Mens, Noordkaap, Clouseau, Omdat het kan & Average Rob.
