= Rock Zottegem =

Music festival in Zottegem, Belgium

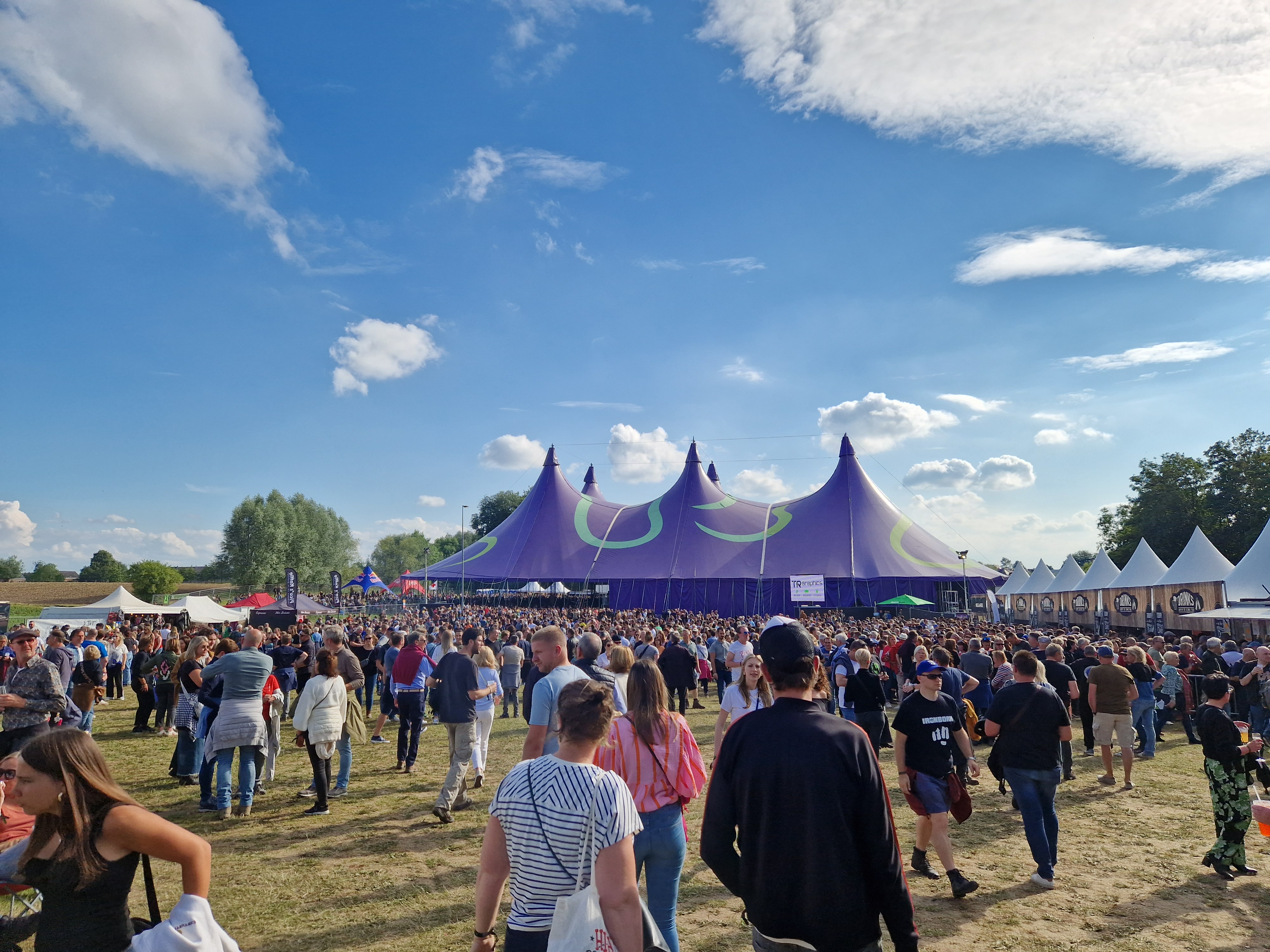
- 2024 Rock Zottegem Festival
- Genre: Performing arts festival
- Frequency: Annually
- Locations: Zottegem, Belgium
- Coordinates: 50°52′03″N 03°49′46″E
- Years active: 9 July 1994 – present
- Participants: See lineups
- Attendance: 40,000
- Capacity: 15,000
- Area: Bevegemse Vijvers
- Website: rock-zottegem.be

Rock Zottegem is a music festival organized annually in Zottegem, Belgium.

The first edition took place in 1994. Through the years, it evaluated from a small free event in the city center of Zottegem to a mid-size festival outside the center. Since 2005, the format changed to a two-day (and occasionally three-day) festival, hosting up to 40,000 visitors.

International artists like James Brown, Toto, ZZ Top, Elvis Costello, Deep Purple and John Fogerty headlined Rock Zottegem. In 2010, after his performance with the Stooges, Iggy Pop was rushed to the local hospital with an eyebrow ripped open after a stage dive.

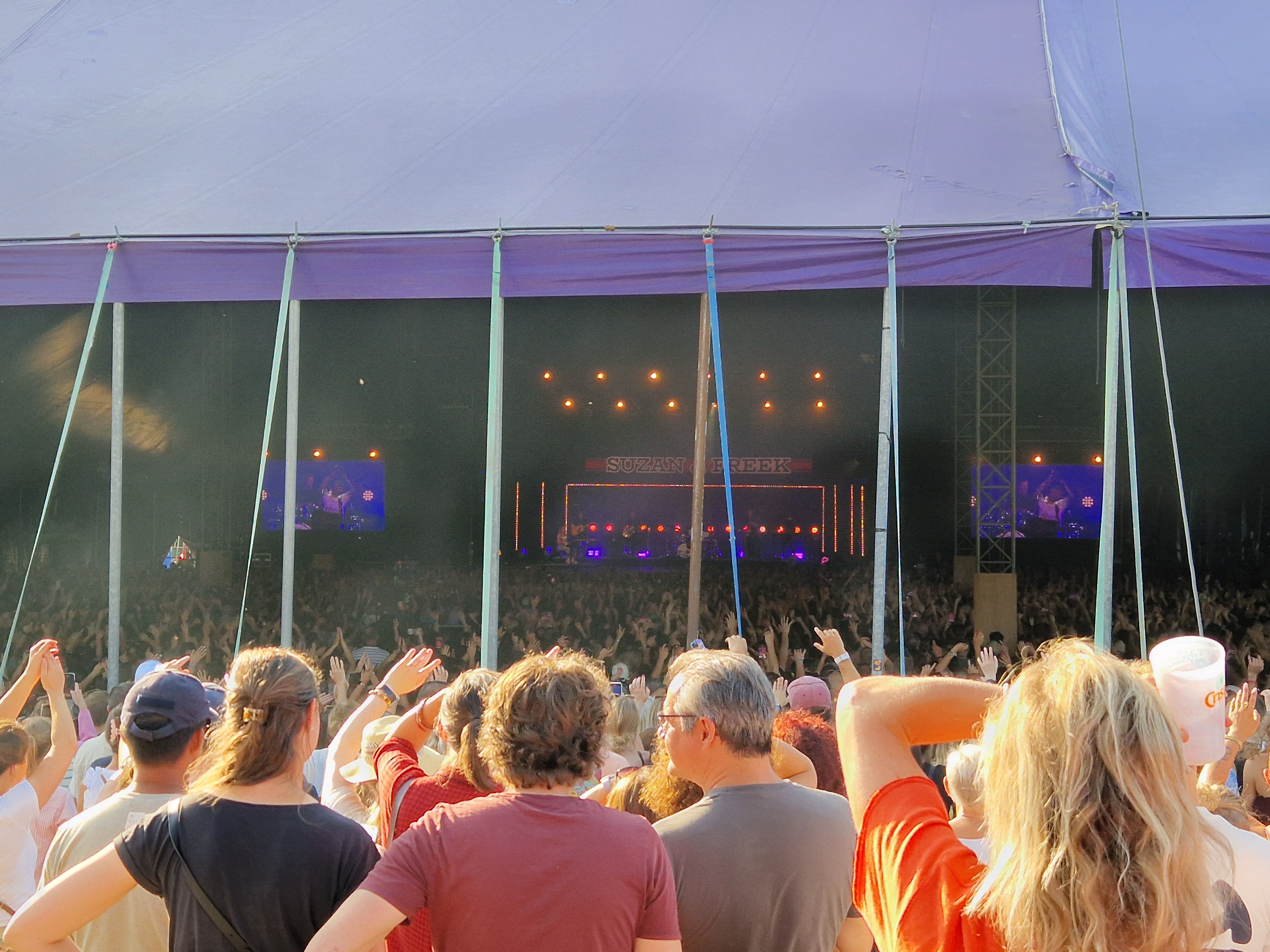
Main stage in 2025

== Lineups ==
| 1994 | Ben Crabbé & The Floorshow, Betty Goes Green, Metal Molly |
| 1995 | Gorki, The Clement Peerens Explosition, De Lama's |
| 1996 | De Mens, Noordkaap, Ben Crabbé & The Floorshow, The Romans |
| 1997 | De Mens |
| 1998 | Noordkaap |
| 1999 | Arno |
| 2000 | The Stranglers, Tom Robinson, Red Zebra, ABN |
| 2001 | Therapy?, Fischer-Z, De Mens, Mintzkov, Janez Detd., ABN |
| 2002 | Levellers, Dog Eat Dog, Das Pop, Monza, Camden, Eden, Garçons Debilles |
| 2003 | Iggy Pop, Echo & the Bunnymen, Arid, Gorki, .calibre, Unreal |
| 2004 | Front 242, James Brown, Mauro & The Grooms, Anouk, Krezip, The Skavengers |
| 2005 | Motörhead, Arno, Heideroosjes, Clouseau, Morgan Heritage, De Mens, Daan, Zornik |
| 2006 | Deep Purple, Dog Eat Dog, Levellers, Millionaire, Novastar, Praga Khan, Vive la Fête, An Pierlé, Funeral Dress |
| 2007 | Madness, The Sisters of Mercy, Clouseau, Daan, The Bony King of Nowhere, The Datsuns, Gorki, Admiral Freebee, A Brand, Nailpin, The Van Jets, Larsson |
| 2008 | Motörhead, Blondie, Joe Jackson, Molly Johnson, Flogging Molly, Arsenal, Zita Swoon, Gabriel Ríos, Freaky Age, Team William, Nailpin, El Guapo Stuntteam, Dr. Lektroluv, Penguins Know Why |
| 2009 | Pretenders, Alice Cooper, Echo & the Bunnymen, Michael Franti & Spearhead, Shameboy, Therapy?, De Jeugd van Tegenwoordig, Apocalyptica, Heideroosjes, The Neon Judgement, A Brand, Jasper Erkens, Madensuyu, Curvy Cuties Fanclub |
| 2010 | Iggy and The Stooges, Public Image Ltd, The Charlatans, Taylor Hawkins & The Coattail, Guano Apes, The Opposites, Flogging Molly, Daan, Das Pop, Balthazar, Novastar, Stake, Freaky Age, Darren Price, Superlijm, Riders |
| 2011 | Status Quo, Simple Minds, Levellers, Channel Zero, Papa Roach, De Jeugd van Tegenwoordig, The Airborne Toxic Event, The Sore Losers, Zornik, The Van Jets, Mojo Filters, Sound of Stereo, Little Trouble Kids, Teddiedrum |
| 2012 | The Human League, Sepultura, Alanis Morissette, The Cult, Soulfly, Heideroosjes, Triggerfinger, Gavin DeGraw, Gun, Arsenal, The Subs, De Mens, Geppetto & the Whales, Bed Rugs, Kapitan Korsakov |
| 2013 | ZZ Top, Golden Earring, Bush, dEUS, Hooverphonic, Suicidal Tendencies, Felix da Housecat, Black Box Revelation, The Opposites, Gers Pardoel, Absynthe Minded, Dr. Lektroluv, Marco Z |
| 2014 | UB40, The Sisters of Mercy, Europe, Starsailor, White Lies, Ozark Henry, De Jeugd van Tegenwoordig, The Subs, Channel Zero, Daan, Compact Disk Dummies, SX, School is Cool, Shantel & Bucovina Club Orkestar, Psycho 44 |
| 2015 | Toto, Placebo, Orchestral Manoeuvres in the Dark, Green Velvet, Saxon, Ed Kowalczyk, Arsenal, Novastar, Wolfpack, Fiddler's Green, The Mirror Trap, The Scabs, Jett Rebel, Yellow Claw, ZwartWerk |
| 2016 | Elvis Costello & The Imposters, Grace Jones, The Kooks, The Hives, Channel Zero, Skunk Anansie, K's Choice, De Jeugd van Tegenwoordig, Emma Bale, Gogol Bordello, Fleddy Melculy, The Sore Losers, Faisal, Id!ots, Jill Shaw |
| 2017 | Bryan Ferry, Golden Earring, Anouk, Milow, Kraantje Pappie, GOOSE, Het Zesde Metaal, Tout Va Bien, Bazart, Equal Idiots, The Lighthouse |
| 2018 | Kaiser Chiefs, The Offspring, The Jesus and Mary Chain, Fischer-Z, Levellers, Clouseau, Millionaire, Arno, Lil’ Kleine, Lost Frequencies, Coely, Fleddy Melculy, Jebroer, SONS |
| 2019 | Tears for Fears, Limp Bizkit, Midnight Oil, Interpol, Heideroosjes, Flogging Molly, Arsenal, Walk off the Earth, Boef, Gers Pardoel, Regi, Blck Mamba, Black Leather Jacket, Enzo Siffredi, Jay Baker, Konna, Lewsberg, Maxim Lany |
| 2020 | No edition due to the COVID-19 pandemic |
| 2021 | No edition due to the COVID-19 pandemic |
| 2022 | Texas, Razorlight, dEUS, Triggerfinger, Arsenal, Eno, Tourist LeMC, The Clement Peerens Explosition, Clouseau, De Kreuners, Bazart, Ramkot, Joost, ILA |
| 2023 | Wolfmother, Soulfly, Kaleo, Two Door Cinema Club, The Waterboys, Fleddy Melculy, Noordkaap, K's Choice, Willie Wartaal, Isaac Roux, Zwangere Guy |
| 2024 | John Fogerty, Toto, Joost Klein, Brutus, Heideroosjes, Daan, Hellmut Lotti Goes Metal, Pommelien Thijs, Bart Peeters & De Ideale Mannen, Bizkit Park, Prins S. en De Geit, DIKKE, Sophie Straat, Brihang, Ironborn |
| 2025 | Roxette, Within Temptation, Manic Street Preachers, Rival Sons, Merol, Fischer-Z, Arsenal, Goldband, Suzan & Freek, Novastar, Regi Penxten feat. Linda, J. Bernardt, Alice Mae, Kaat Van Stralen |
