= Sore Loser (disambiguation) =

A sore loser is someone who complains or blames others for their loss, exhibiting poor sportsmanship.

Sore Loser may also refer to:

- "Sore Loser", a song from Tierra Whack's 2018 album Whack World
- "Sore Loser", a 2019 song by KennyHoopla
- The Sore Losers, a Belgian rock band

== See also ==
- Sore loser law, in United States politics
