= Compact Disk Dummies =

Belgian electropunk band

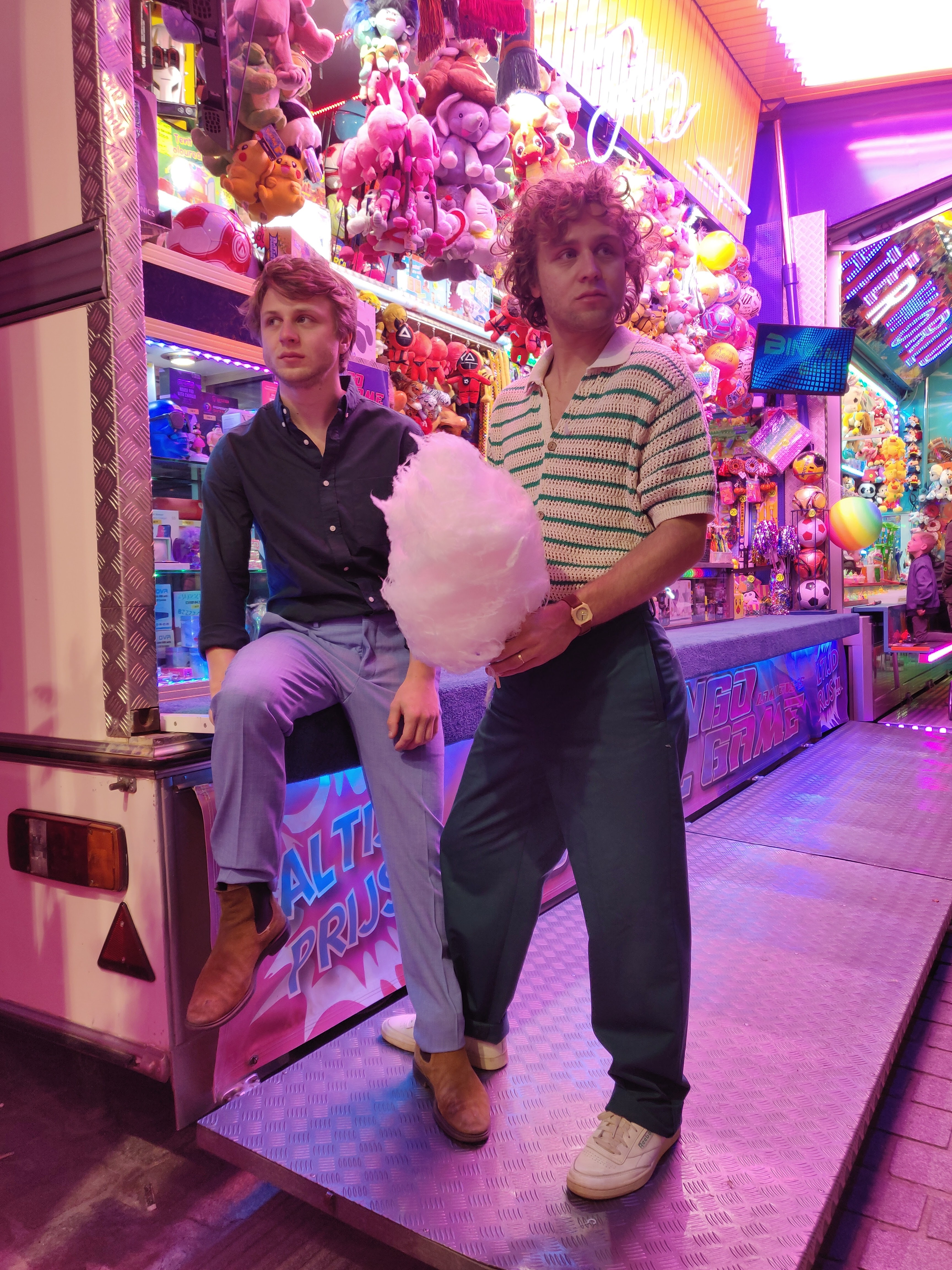
- Compact Disk Dummies in 2022

Background information
- Origin: Desselgem, Belgium
- Genres: Electropunk
- Years active: 2010–present
- Labels: PIAS Recordings
- Members: Lennert Coorevits; Janus Coorevits
- Website: www.compactdiskdummies.info

The Compact Disk Dummies is a Belgian electropunk band from Desselgem (Waregem). The group consists of the brothers Lennert (born in 1993) and Janus Coorevits (born in 1995). Both do the vocals and play keyboards, Lennert also plays the guitar. Live they play with drummer Robin Wille.

== History ==
The group was founded in 2010 and in the same year they won the Music Live event, and ended second at the Belgian edition of the Kunstbende. Their musical breakthrough came when the two brothers won Humo's Rock Rally as teenagers in 2012, in the Ancienne Belgique. They ended before groups as Geppetto & The Whales to become the successors of School is Cool.

In March 2013 they brought out their first EP "Mess with Us", together with their first single "The Reeling". The title temporarily reached the top of Studio Brussel's De Afrekening list on 27 April 2013, and stood in the Flemish Ultratop 50 during six weeks. In the summer of 2013 they featured in festivals like the Lokerse Feesten and Pukkelpop.

On 6 May 2016, the band released their debut album Silver Souls.

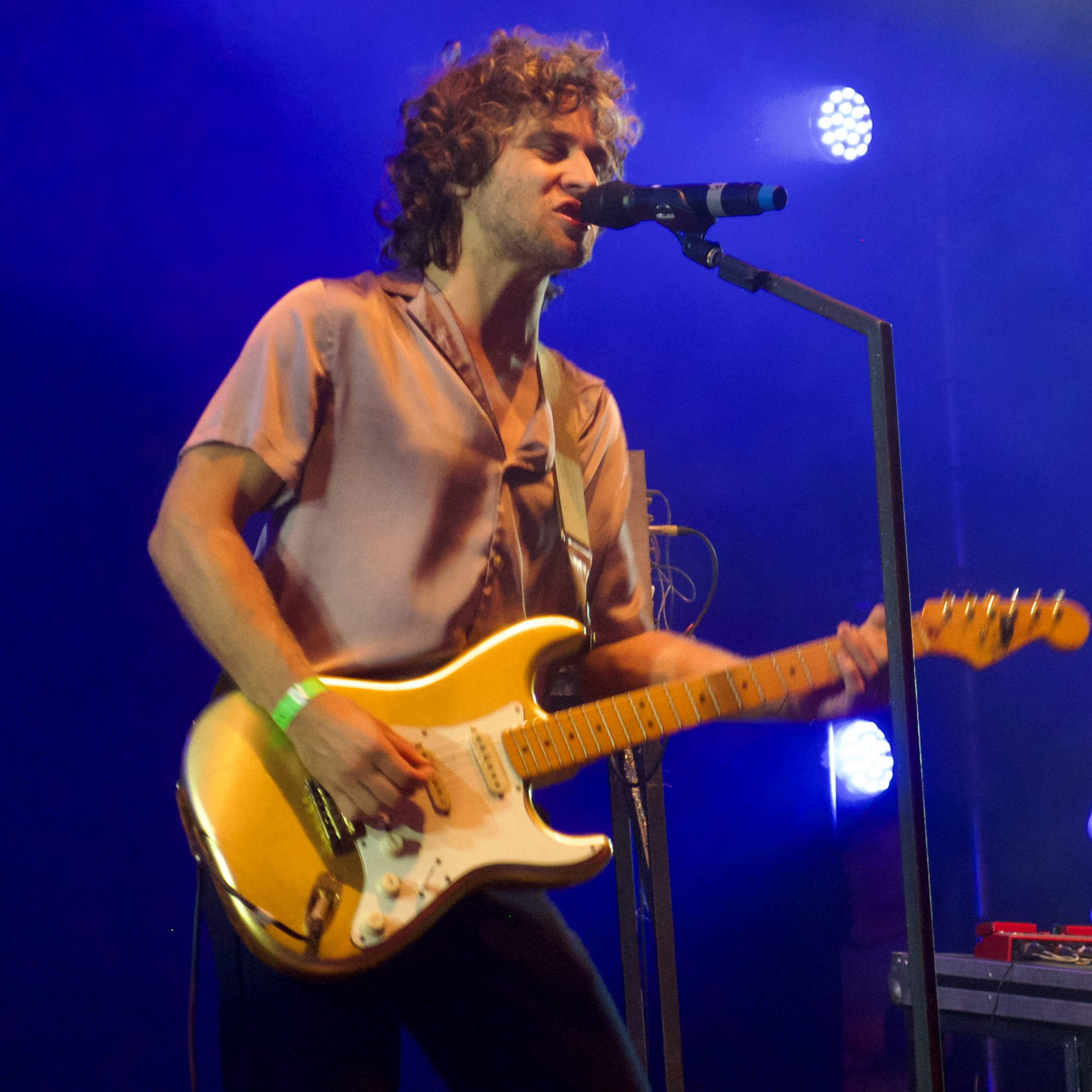
Lennert Coorevits performing in 2023

== Discography ==
=== Albums ===
- Silver Souls (2016)
- Neon Fever Dream (2020)
- The Signal (2024)

=== EPs ===
- Mess with Us (2013)
- Satellites (2019)

=== Singles ===
Year	Single	Peak positions
Year	Single	BEL (Fl)
2013	"The Reeling"	38
2013	"Mess with Us"	tip68
2013	"What You Want"	tip14
2016	"Girls Keep Drinking"	tip22
2017	"Remain in Light"	tip43
2019	"Cry for Me"	tip13
2019	"Satellites" (featuring Tom Barman)	tip8
2020	"I Remember"	tip5
2021	"On Repeat"	tip10
