= Jumping the Tracks =

Jumping the Tracks may refer to:

- Jumping the Tracks (+/- album), 2014
- Jumping the Tracks (The Scabs album), 1991
