= King Dalton =

Belgian rock band

King Dalton is a Belgian rock band.

King Dalton's members hail from Aalst, Antwerp and Ghent, and had previously played in bands such as Laïs, Zita Swoon, A Brand, Think of One, and Aedo. The group's sound is strongly influenced by American Delta blues and folk music, as well as the music of North Africa. The group's first album was released in 2013, and they appeared at Pukkelpop in 2014. On August 31, 2015, they released their second full-length album, Thilda, which was followed by airplay on Radio 1 Belgium.

== Members ==
- Pieter de Meester - vocals
- Jonas de Meester
- Jorunn Bauweraerts - vocals
- Tomas de Smet
- Frederick Heuvinck

== Discography ==
- King Dalton (Waste My Records, 2013) BEL (FL) #141
- Thilda (Waste My Records, 2015) BEL (FL) #42
- The Third (Waste My Records, 2018) BEL (FL) #181
