= The Subs =

Belgian electro band

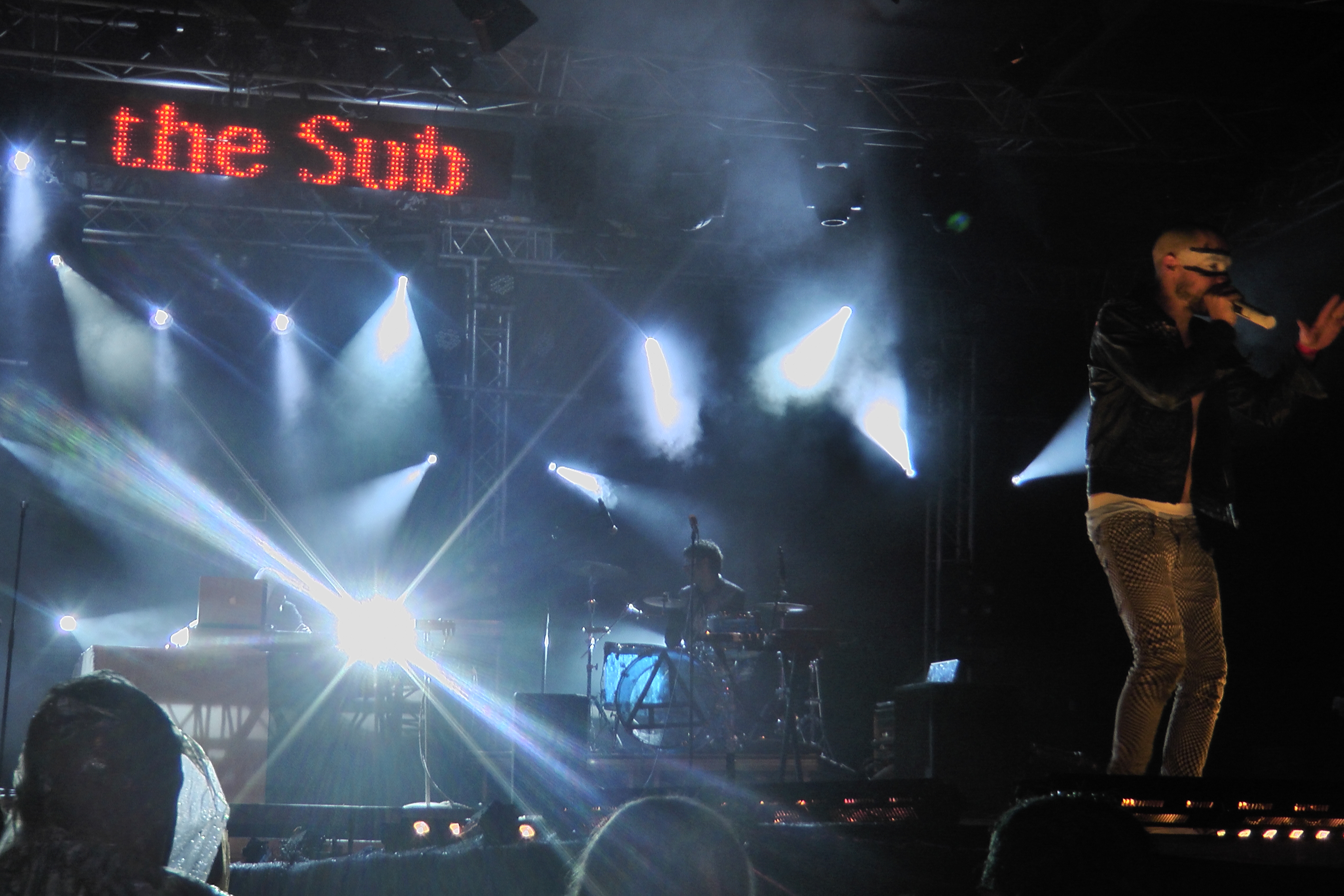
- The Subs performing at the Westerpop festival in Delft, 2011.

Background information
- Origin: Ghent, Belgium
- Years active: 2006–present
- Labels: Universal
- Members: Jeroen De Pessemier (Papillon); Wiebe Loccufier (Tonic); Martijn Ravesloot (Melawati)
- Website: www.thesubs.be

The Subs is a Belgian electro band founded by Jeroen "Papillon" De Pessemier and Wiebe "Tonic" Loccufier.

== History ==
=== Early days ===
Following early success with underground club hits like "You Make Me Spill," "Fuck That Shit," and "Substracktion," the raw punktrance track "Kiss My Trance" marked the band's definitive breakthrough in 2008. The song quickly made its way to the top of the commercial charts and got picked up by influential DJs including Boys Noize, T. Raumschmiere, Laurent Garnier, and Tiësto.

In the wake of their arrival on the international scene, The Subs made several remixes for artists like Alex Gopher, The Lotterboys, Plump DJs, Telex, and Cassius. By the end of 2008, The Subs released their critically acclaimed debut album Subculture on the Belgian Lektroluv label. Following "Kiss My Trance," a second single – "Music Is The New Religion" – was released to promote the album.

Getting more and more airplay, the band quickly made a name for itself. In May 2009, The Subs were invited by Rob da Bank to make a one-hour mixtape for his show on BBC Radio 1. Several months later, on 16 October 2009, London Club Fabric celebrated its 10-year anniversary. The club management asked The Subs to perform at its birthday party and to record an exclusive give-away anniversary track, "Mitsubitchi."

=== First gold record: "The Pope of Dope" ===
In early 2010, The Subs recorded a single, "The Pope of Dope", together with Party Harders. The track became an instant hit with more than 10,000 copies sold. The song earned the band its first gold record in Belgium.

Playing as a supporting act to The Prodigy in Zénith de Lille (France) later that year, Papillon vomited on stage. The event inspired The Subs to write the track "Vomit in Style", which was released on an EP with the same name. The band topped of a particularly productive year with the release of another EP, Rototom/My Body is Gonna Remember, a collaboration with French DJ duo Les Petits Pilous.

=== Successful second album: Decontrol ===
In March 2011, The Subs released their second studio album, Decontrol, again on the Lectroluv label. The first single from this album, "The Face Of The Planet", was exceptionally well received and soon got the band its second gold record.

"The Face of the Planet" became a success on the Australian radio station Triple J. As a result, the band was invited to Australia to play the Future Music Festival, a national festival touring five different cities. Upon arrival in Brisbane, Papillon got arrested for filming ‘the journey of their luggage along the luggage conveyor’. He was released with a stern warning.

In 2011, The Subs brought home their third gold record with Zanna, a cover of Luc Van Acker's eighties cult classic, featuring Tom Barman (dEUS) and Selah Sue.

In 2013, The Subs released an EP called “Collaborations” where they worked with producers Étienne de Crécy, Zombie Nation, Alex Gopher, Shinichi Osawa, John Roman, Blatan and Hoshina Anniversary.

=== New alliances: Hologram ===
On their third studio album, Hologram, released in 2014, The Subs surprised fans and critics alike. Multi-instrumentalist Hadrien Lavogez replaced producer Stefan Bracke, making the band shift towards a more melodic sound. "Concorde", featuring the voice of French actor Jean-Pierre Castaldi, was the first single off this new album to hit the radio waves. The track exemplified a shift in sound with a new, soulful layer added to the band's trademark electropunk sound. Other guests starring on Hologram include Selah Sue, house music legend Colonel Abrams and Jay Brown.

In April 2014, Trapped (featuring Colonel Abrams) was the second single to be released from the album. Later on that year, Cling To Love (featuring Jay Brown) followed suit.

== Live on stage ==
After the success of "Kiss My Trance" in 2008, The Subs started to tour with live shows. They soon established a solid stage reputation, as energetic live performances and a raw punk attitude became their trademark. Frontman Papillon's movement on stage is often referred to as that of a mad professor, because of the combination of knob twisting the hi-tech gear and sometimes-crazy climbing habits and risky stage dives.

The Subs were invited to play at venues around Europe. Australia, Singapore and Thailand discovered the band shortly thereafter. Extensive touring brought The Subs to a series of clubs, including The Fabric, The Egg, and Audio in London (UK), Button Factory in Dublin (Ireland), Womb in Tokyo (JP), Space in Ibiza, Social Club and La Machine in Paris (France), Ancienne Belgique in Brussels, Melkweg and Paradiso in Amsterdam, and the Razzmatazz in Barcelona (Spain).

The band's lively live performance quickly made them a fan-favourite on festivals both at home and abroad. Over the past few years, The Subs have featured at Rock Werchter, Pukkelpop, Dour Festival, Tomorrowland, I Love Techno, Laundry Day, Lokerse Feesten, Feest in het Park, Les Ardentes, Couleur Café and 10 Days Off in Belgium, ADE, Lowlands, Solar Festival, Dance Valley, 5 Days Off, Pitch Festival and Kindergarten in the Netherlands, Bestival, Global Gathering, Isle of Wight Festival, Creamfields and Electric Picnic Festival in the UK, and Les Eurockéennes, Printemps de Bourges and Paradis Artificielles in France.

== Visuals ==
The Subs have always paid particular attention to making original visuals to match their music sometimes shooting their own music videos and creating the artwork for their albums.

=== Music videos ===
For their video for "My Punk" (featured on the Subculture album) in 2009, the band drove on three mopeds from their home city Ghent to the Social Club in Paris. The trio filmed each other with cameras attached to their helmets. The result turned out to be quite an unusual road movie, including footage of the band as they got arrested by the police for driving inside a shopping mall.

Later that year, the Subs played at the Pukkelpop festival in Belgium. In the run-up to the show, they asked fans to film the song "Fuck That Shit" and send them the footage afterward. The Subs filmed the song from the stage as well, with several cameras attached to their instruments. Later on, the footage was mixed into a new video for the song.

=== The Famous Videocast ===
In January 2010 The Subs launched a new concept on YouTube, which they called The Famous Videocast. During three short shows, hosted by The Subs themselves, the band members talk about the music videos they like. Each time they mention a video, you can click through to the video. After each video, you get directed back to the show.

=== Artwork ===
The artwork for their second album, Decontrol, was created in an organic way, to highlight the contrast with The Subs’ electronic music. A wooden copy of the band's logo was put in a snowed-under field, after which it was set on fire. A photographer took photos of the whole process, eventually (with Glossy.tv on board) resulting in the artwork for the record sleeve.

For "The Face of the Planet", the first single from Decontrol, they approached the artwork in a similar way. Another wooden copy of the band's logo was set on fire, but this time while it was floating on the sea.

For H0L0GRAM they entirely relied on Uber & Kosher to provide the artwork.

== Other production work ==
As a producer, Jeroen ‘Papillon’ De Pessemier worked on Here We Go Again, the 2006 debut album of Lady Linn & Her Magnificent Seven. In 2012, De Pessemier produced Halo, the latest album by Belgian rock band The Van Jets.

In 2014 he founded OTB Records (together with Wiebe Loccufier) and started a solo DJ career as techno act One Track Brain. He is (co)-producing all the output of all the artists on OTB records till present.

In 2015 he co-produced debut release of Charlotte de Witte “Weltschmerz” on Turbo.

From 2014 to 2018 he produced all the output of the elektro hip pop band “Friends in Paris” including the streaming hits “Waiting” and “When your heart is a stranger”.

In 2016 to 2018 he produced all the output of electro pop band Oscar & The Wolf including the full album “Infinity” and the hits “The Game” “Breathing” “Fever”

In 2018 he produced the debut album “YL” of Warhola including the hit “Promise”

== Members ==
- Songwriter/producer: Jeroen De Pessemier (Papillon)
- DJ/producer: Wiebe Loccufier (Tonic)
- Songwriter/producer: Martijn Ravesloot (Melawati)

== Discography ==
=== Albums ===
Album(s) that entered the Ultratop 50 album chart	Release date	First charted	Highest ranking	Weeks	Remarks
Subculture	24-10-2008	01-11-2008	33	18	
Decontrol	25-03-2011	02-04-2011	12	19	
Hologram	24-02-2014	05-04-2014	19	17	
A Decade of Dance 2006–2016	27-05-2016	04-06-2016	52		

=== Singles ===
Single title	Release date	Charting in the Dutch Top 40			Comments
Single title	Release date	Date of entry	Highest	Weeks	Comments
Zanna	28-11-2011	-			met Selah Sue & Tom Barman / Nr. 72 in de Single Top 100

Single(s) that entered the Ultratop 50 singles chart	Release date	First charted	Highest ranking	Weeks	Remarks
"Kiss My Trance"	2008	02-02-2008	18	12	
"Music Is the New Religion"	2008	06-12-2008	43	2	
"The Pope of Dope"	2010	08-05-2010	12	20	with Party Harders / Golden record BE
"The Face of the Planet"	2011	05-03-2011	10	13	/ Golden record BE
"Don't Stop"	2011	2011	tip2	-	with Highbloo
"Zanna"	2011	10-12-2011	1(4wk)	11	with Selah Sue & Tom Barman / Nr. 9 in the Radio 2 Top 30 / Golden record BE
"Decontrol"	2011	07-01-2012	tip96	-	
"Concorde"	2014	25-01-2014	21	8	
"Trapped" (feat. Colonel Abrams)	2014	05-04-2014	25	10	
"Cling to Love"	2014	30-06-2014	14	8	
"Flesh & Bones" (with Tsar B)	2019	23-11-2019	tip16		

=== Other singles ===
- "You Make Me Spill" - 2006 (Dirty Dancing Recordings)
- "You Make Me Spill" - 2006 (Suicide Recordings)
- "Substracktion" - 2006 (Lektroluv Recordings)
- "Fuck That Shit" - 2007 (Lektroluv Recordings)
- "Kiss My Trance" - 2007 (Lektroluv Recordings)
- "Papillon" - 2008 (Lektroluv Recordings)
- "Music Is the New Religion" - 2008 (Lektroluv Recordings)
- "My Punk" - 2008 (Lektroluv Recordings)
- "From Dusk Till Dawn" - 2009 (Lektroluv Recordings)
- "Mitsubitchi" - 2010 (Lektroluv Recordings)
- "The Pope of Dope" (feat. The Party Harders) - 2010 (Lektroluv Recordings)
- "Concorde" - 2014 (Lektroluv Recordings)

=== Remixes ===
- Telex - How do you dance (Virgin Records)
- Javelo - Spleen (Dancing Recordings)
- Sharam Jey - When the dogs bite (King Kong Records)
- dEUS - Bad timing (unreleased)
- Pacjam - Urban minds (541 recordings)
- Shameboy - Wired for sound (Sputnik Recordings)
- Foxylane - Naked to bed (Some Like It Hot Records)
- The Lotterboys - Can't control the boogie (Eskimo Recordings)
- Acid Jacks - Disco Shoes (Kerowack)
- Mason - Quarter (Great Stuff Recordings)
- Boemklatsch feat. Faberyeyo - Spikkeltjes (Lektroluv records)
- La Roux - Colourless Colour
- Gotye - Heart's a mess (Never officially released)
