= De Afrekening =

Belgian radio and record chart program

De Afrekening is a Belgian radio and record chart broadcasting program featured on Studio Brussel (commonly referred to as "StuBru") since 1985. During the program, thirty top-rating "alternative" tracks are played, with the chart being assembled by the program's audience via a voting poll system. Two or three times each year, StuBru will release an album featuring the program's most popular chart tracks. Beginning in 1990, albums are still released today and continue to prove popular with fans.

Since the chart is assembled via voting, unexpected results and outcomes will sometimes occur. One such instance occurred on 19 April 2006, with two separate songs placing first after receiving an equal number of votes. The songs in question were Placebo's "Song to Say Goodbye," and A Brand's "Hammerhead". Another historical event occurred on 31 May 2006. For the first time ever, a song featured on the annual Eurovision Song Contest entered the charts. This song was Lordi's "Hard Rock Hallelujah."

At the end of each year, the most popular songs of that year is assembled. This chart is known as the "Eindafrekening," or by its nickname "De Afvaardiging."

The chart is also broadcast on TMF Flanders

== The Final Settlement ("De Eindafrekening") ==
Since 1985, listeners of De Afrekening have voted for the Eindafrekening every year. The Eindafrekening has had nine Belgian winners with The Scabs (1990), dEUS (1995, 1996, 1999 and 2008), K's Choice (1998), A Brand (2006), Milow (2007), Customs (2009), The Van Jets (2010), Oscar and the Wolf (2014), Bazart (2016) and The Haunted Youth (2022). R.E.M. (1989 and 1991), Muse (2003 and 2015) and Tool (2001 and 2019) have won twice. Only dEUS has won four times.

Year	Artist	Track
1985	Simple Minds	"Alive and Kicking"
1986	Madonna	"Papa Don't Preach"
1987	XTC	"Dear God"
1988	Tracy Chapman	"Fast Car"
1989	R.E.M.	"Orange Crush"
1990	The Scabs	"Hard Times"
1991	R.E.M.	"Losing My Religion"
1992	U2	"One"
1993	Rage Against the Machine	"Killing in the Name"
1994	Magnapop	"Lay It Down"
1995	dEUS	"Hotellounge"
1996	dEUS	"Little Arithmetics"
1997	Radiohead	"Karma Police"
1998	K's Choice	"Believe"
1999	dEUS	"Instant Street"
2000	Live	"They Stood Up for Love"
2001	Tool	"Schism"
2002	Red Hot Chili Peppers	"By the Way"
2003	Muse	"Time Is Running Out"
2004	Franz Ferdinand	"The Dark of the Matinee"
2005	Interpol	"Evil"
2006	A Brand	"Hammerhead"
2007	Milow	"You Don't Know"
2008	dEUS	"The Architect"
2009	Customs	"Rex"
2010	The Van Jets	"The Future"
2011	Foo Fighters	"Walk"
2012	Arctic Monkeys	"R U Mine?"
2013	Bastille	"Pompeii"
2014	Oscar and the Wolf	"Strange Entity"
2015	Muse	"Mercy"
2016	Bazart	"Chaos"
2017	Arcade Fire	"Everything Now"
2018	Florence + the Machine	"Hunger"
2019	Tool	"Fear Inoculum"
2020	Taylor Swift ft. Bon Iver	"exile"
2021	Måneskin	"Zitti e buoni"
2022	The Haunted Youth	"Gone"
2023	The Beaches	"Blame Brett"

== The Ultimate Final Settlement ("De Ultieme Eindafrekening") ==
To celebrate 35 years De Afrekening, listeners voted for the De Ultieme Eindafrekening from the previous winners.

Note: Belgian artists

#	Song	Artist	Country of origin
1	Killing in the Name	Rage Against the Machine	United States
2	R U Mine?	Arctic Monkeys	United Kingdom
3	Instant Street	dEUS	Belgium
4	Schism	Tool	United States
5	Karma Police	Radiohead	United Kingdom
6	Hard Times	The Scabs	Belgium
7	Time Is Running Out	Muse	United Kingdom
8	Walk	Foo Fighters	United States
9	Losing My Religion	R.E.M.	United States
10	Everything Now	Arcade Fire	Canada
11	One	U2	Ireland
12	Hotellounge	dEUS	Belgium
13	Lay It Down	Magnapop	United States
14	Fast Car	Tracy Chapman	United States
15	The Future	The Van Jets	Belgium
16	Evil	Interpol	United States
17	They Stood Up for Love	Live	United States
18	Hunger	Florence + the Machine	United Kingdom
19	Fear Inoculum	Tool	United States
20	Alive and Kicking	Simple Minds	United Kingdom
21	By the Way	Red Hot Chili Peppers	United States
22	Pompeii	Bastille	United Kingdom
23	Dear God	XTC	United Kingdom
24	Rex	Customs	Belgium
25	Orange Crush	R.E.M.	United States
26	Hammerhead	A Brand	Belgium
27	Strange Entity	Oscar and the Wolf	Belgium
28	Mercy	Muse	United Kingdom
29	The Architect	dEUS	Belgium
30	Believe	K's Choice	Belgium
31	Little Arithmetics	dEUS	Belgium
32	Chaos	Bazart	Belgium
33	The Dark of the Matinée	Franz Ferdinand	United Kingdom
34	You Don't Know	Milow	Belgium
35	Papa Don't Preach	Madonna	United States

== See also ==
- 3VOOR12
