= Glints (musician) =

- Born: Jan Maarschalk Lemmens; 20 September 1993 (age 32); Antwerp, Belgium
- Genres: Hip hop; grime; indie pop
- Occupations: Rapper; singer; songwriter
- Instrument: Vocals
- Years active: 2014–present
- Label: Run Tell Secrecy

Jan Maarschalk Lemmens, professionally known as Glints, is a Flemish rapper and singer. Born in Antwerp, he released his first single "Dread" in 2014, with the self-titled début EP Glints following a year later.

In 2018, Glints released the single "Bugatti", the lead single off the first album, as of now, untitled. The song marked a shift away from his prior indie pop sound into more grime-influenced material, and became a minor hit in Belgium. Glints has also collaborated with electronic duo VRWRK on several occasions, most notoriously on their single "New Flow".

Glints has played sets at several major music festivals, notably at Pukkelpop in 2017.

== Members ==
- Jan Maarschalk Lemmens – vocals, songwriting

=== Current ===
- Jergan Callebaut – production, keyboards
- Mathias Bervoets – guitar
- Tim Caramin – drums

=== Former ===
- Ferre Marnef – bass

== Discography ==
- Glints (2015)
- Burgundy (2017)
- Choirboy (2020)
- The Dark! (2023)
