= Stuff. =

Stuff. (stylized STUFF.) is a Belgian jazz ensemble from Ghent.

Stuff was founded in 2012 by Lander Gyselinck, a drummer who began performing live music at the White Cat bar in Ghent when its owners requested live music in between DJ sets. The group has released three full-length albums, all of which have charted on the Ultratop 200 in Belgium.

== Members ==
- Andrew Claes - Saxophone
- Dries Laheye - Bass
- Lander Gyselinck - Drums
- Mixmonster Menno - Samples
- Joris Caluwaerts - keyboards

== Discography ==
- STUFF. (2015) BEL #45
- Old Dreams, New Planets (2017) BEL #2
- T(h)reats (2021) BEL #6
