= Brutus (Belgian band) =

Belgian post-hardcore band

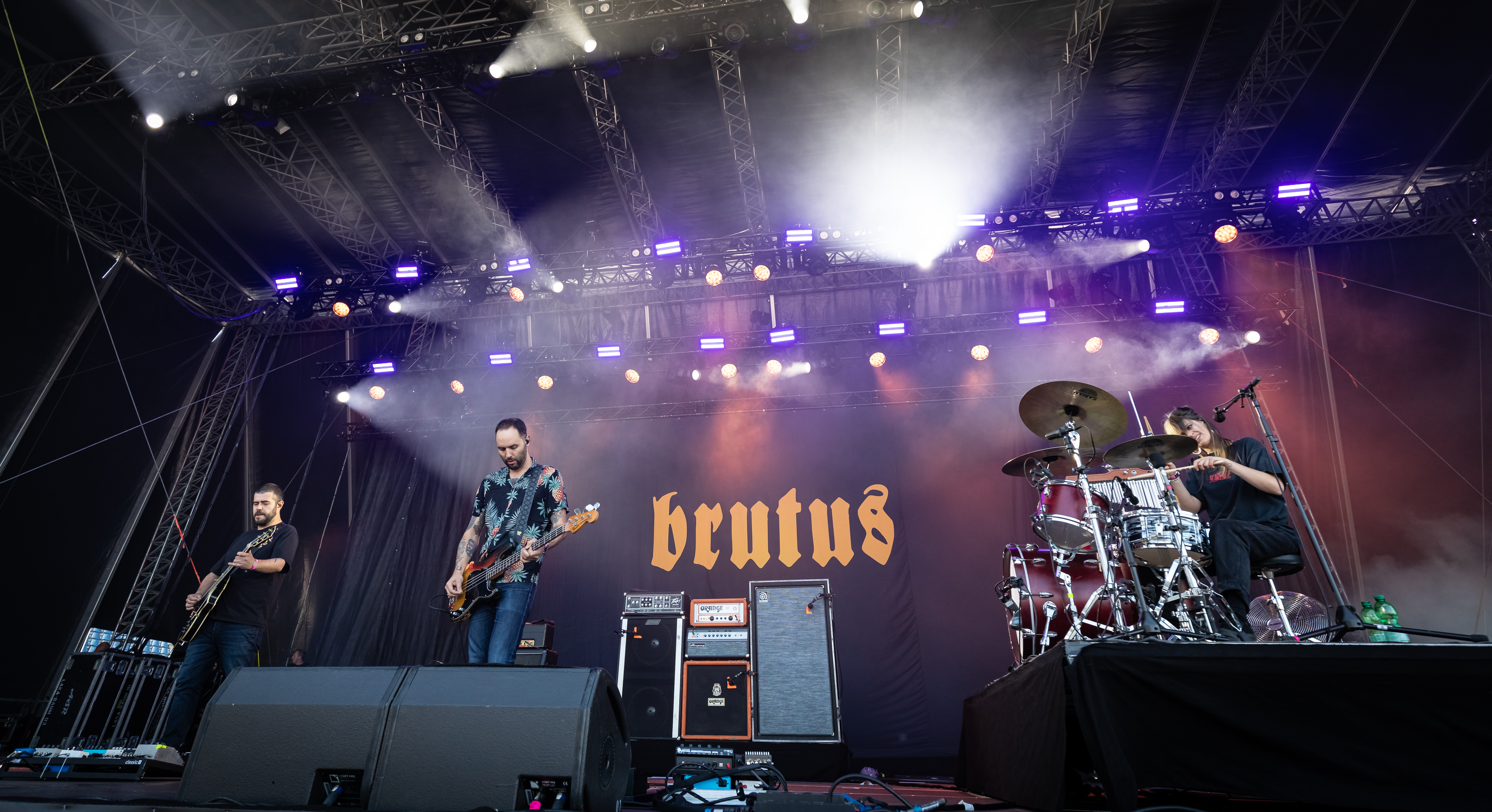
- Brutus performing at Rock am Ring in 2023

Background information
- Origin: Leuven, Belgium
- Genres: Post-hardcore; post-metal; post-rock
- Years active: 2013–present
- Labels: Hassle Records, Sargent House
- Members: Stefanie Mannaerts; Peter Mulders; Stijn Vanhoegaerden
- Website: www.wearebrutus.be

Brutus is a Belgian rock band from Leuven, formed in 2013. The trio consists of vocalist and drummer Stefanie Mannaerts, guitarist Stijn Vanhoegaerden and bassist Peter Mulders.

Originating from multiple local bands, Brutus performed often in Belgium before internationally releasing their debut album Burst in 2017 and signing with the record label Sargent House. The band followed it up with Nest in 2019 and Unison Life in 2022.

== History ==
The members of Brutus met each other playing in different bands around Leuven. Drummer and vocalist Stefanie Mannaerts and bassist Peter Mulders played together in Refused Party Program, a Refused tribute band playing The Shape of Punk to Come in full, while guitarist Stijn Vanhoegaerden and Mannaerts were both in the band Starfucker since the late 2000s.

In 2014 and 2015, Brutus played at various festivals, such as Pukkelpop, Rock Herk, and Dour Festival. The band released a trilogy of two-song EPs throughout 2015. In 2016, the band left for Vancouver to record their debut album, enlisting the help of Vancouver-based producer Jesse Gander, who was known for his work with Japandroids and White Lung. At this point, the band was still unsigned.

Brutus' debut album Burst was released on 3 February 2017, on Hassle Records in Europe. Shortly after, the band signed with Sargent House, who distributed the album in the United States and worldwide. The album received positive co-signs from The Dillinger Escape Plan vocalist Greg Puciato and Thrice drummer Riley Breckenridge, as well as Metallica drummer Lars Ulrich, who played the single "Drive" on his Apple Music radio show. To promote the album, the band toured with labelmates Chelsea Wolfe and Russian Circles, also supporting Thrice's European tour.

The band recorded with producer Gander again in Vancouver for their second album Nest. Lead single "War" was released on 23 January 2019, and the album came out on 29 March. The title refers to the band's network of close friends and family. Brutus' first United States tour took place in fall 2019, including a stop at Deftones' annual Dia de los Deftones festival in San Diego.

In order to make up for the absence of live music during the COVID-19 pandemic, the band released their first live album, Live in Ghent, on 23 October 2020, a recording of a sold-out May 2019 show in their hometown. Brutus was supposed to play the 2020 Roadburn Festival in the Netherlands, but it was cancelled.

On 28 July 2022, Brutus announced the release of their third album Unison Life on 21 October, preceded by four singles: "Dust", "Liar", "Victoria" and "What Have We Done". The band made their delayed Roadburn debut in 2023, also playing the Rock am Ring and Rock im Park, Download, Copenhell, Pinkpop, 2000 Trees and ArcTanGent festivals in the summer, completing a busy tour schedule.

== Musical style and influences ==
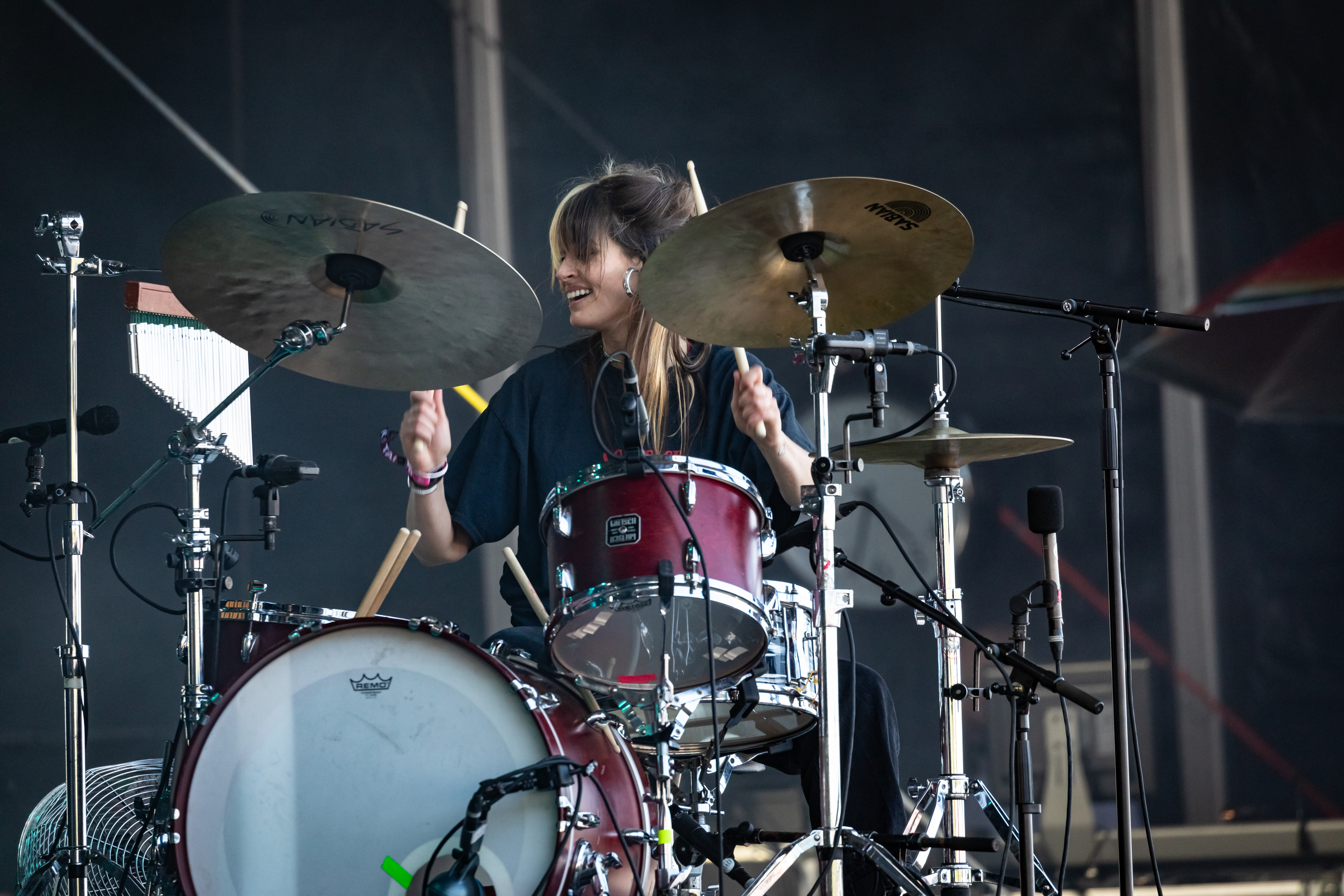
Mannaerts performing at Rock am Ring in 2023

Brutus has been labeled as a post-hardcore, post-metal and post-rock band. AllMusic's John D. Buchanan said that the band combines "elements of post-rock, mathcore, black metal, and prog." Kerrang! wrote that the song "Sugar Dragon" is "an exercise in slowburning shoegaze euphoria." Stereogum described their music as containing "huge Godspeed guitars with even-huger Baroness choruses."

Mannaerts listed her five favorite drummers as Ben Koller of Converge, Levon Helm of The Band, Joris Casier of Stake, Taylor Hawkins of Foo Fighters and John Bonham of Led Zeppelin. She has mentioned being inspired by Karin Dreijer, Stevie Nicks and Emma Ruth Rundle.

== Band members ==
- Stefanie Mannaerts – vocals, drums
- Stijn Vanhoegaerden – guitar
- Peter Mulders – bass

== Discography ==
=== Album ===
- Burst (2017) – No. 30 BE
- Nest (2019) – No. 4 BE
- Unison Life (2022) – No. 6 BE, No. 73 GER

=== EPs ===
- Brutu Guru (2015) – split album with The Guru Guru

=== Live albums ===
- Live in Ghent (2020) – No. 63 BE
- Live in Brussels (2025)

=== Singles ===
- "All Along" (2016)
- "Drive" (2017)
- "Horde II" (2017)
- "Justice de Julia II" (2018)
- "War" (2019)
- "Cemetery" (2019)
- "Django" (2019)
- "Sand" (2020)
- "Dust" (2022)
- "Liar" (2022)
- "Victoria" (2022)
- "Love Won't Hide The Ugliness" (2023)
- "The Deadly Rhythm" (2024)
- "Paradise" (2024)
