= Lady Linn =

Belgian singer

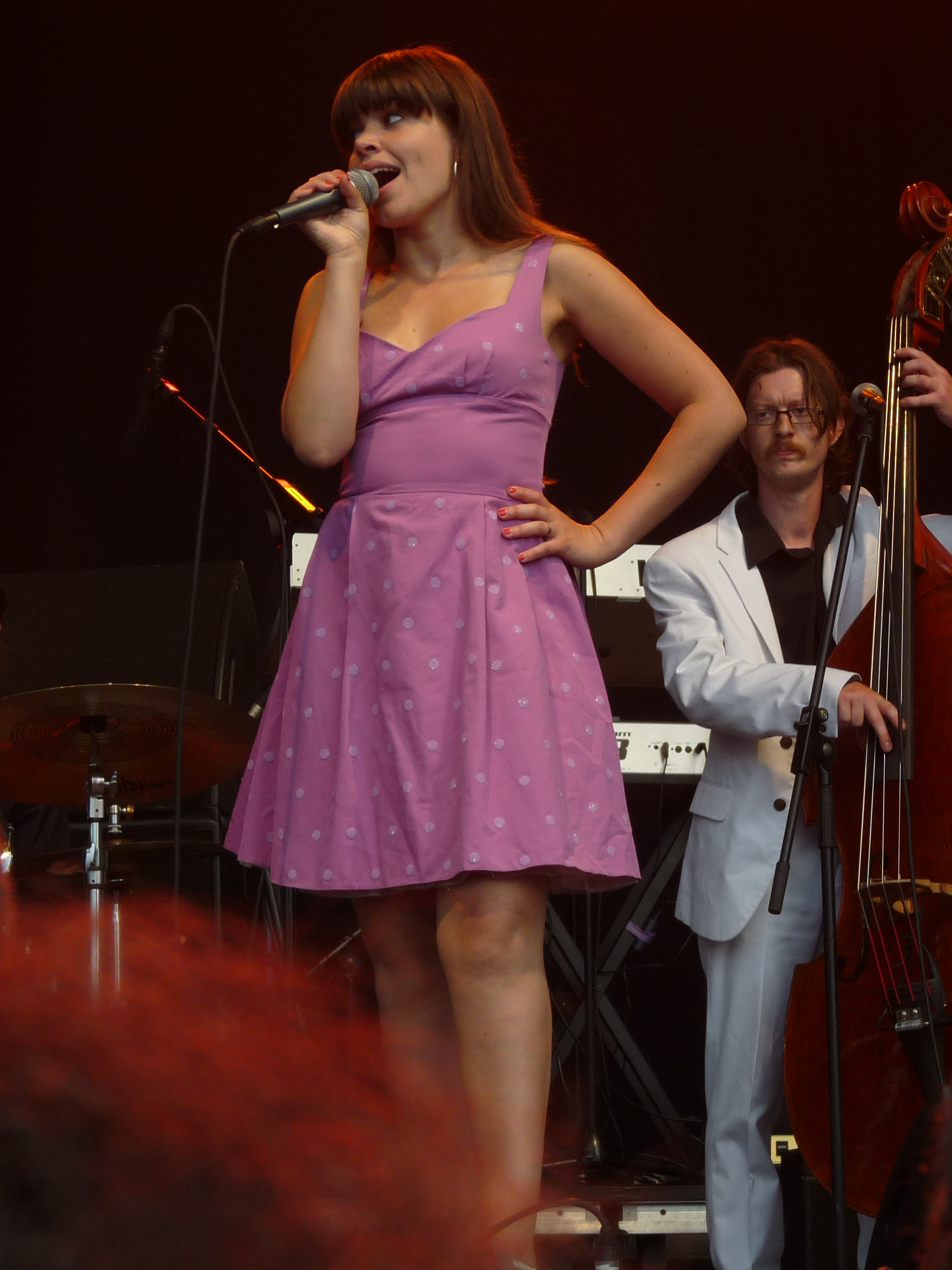

Background information
- Born: Lien De Greef; April 27, 1981 (age 45); Sint-Amandsberg, Belgium
- Genres: Jazz, pop, soul
- Occupations: Singer, composer
- Website: www.ladylinn.be

Lady Linn (born 27 April 1981, in Sint-Amandsberg) is the artist name of the Belgian singer Lien De Greef. She does live performances with her group Lady Linn And Her Magnificent Seven. The band brings a mix of jazz, pop and soul.

== Biography ==
De Greef grew up in the East-Flemish town of Serskamp, a part of the community Wichelen and now lives in Ghent, where she also teaches at the Music Academy and the Institute for Music and Dance (MUDA). She studied jazz and light music at the Conservatory of Ghent. After she graduated in 2004, she became the lead singer of Bolchi, a pop group in Ghent led by Jeroen De Pessemier and which currently does live acts with Foxylane and The Subs. Apart from that, she is also the singer of the hip hop band Skeemz. She can also be heard as backing vocal at the CD Over & weer (2008) by Eva De Roovere and the CD Humanoid and single Call on me (both 1999) from Marjan Debaene. She also took care of the singing parts for DJ Red D because of which she could be seen often in Belgian and international house scene. A last project in which Lien participates is "Howie and Linn".

But, because of her affection for jazz in 2004 she let herself surround with seven musicians, and during two years she toured with covers of jazz and swing songs from the 1930s and 1940s. From 2006 on they also started bringing own songs, which resulted in the CD 'Here we go Again' in February 2008. This CD is filled with tracks by De Greef herself, except for one title. With this CD and the corresponding singles they broke through in Flanders and they scored several hits like 'A Love Affair' and 'That's Allright'. In April 2009 they obtained gold with 15,000 sold copies and shortly after even platinum. That period she also stood on the Hotlist of Studio Brussel with her cover of "I Don't Wanna Dance" by Eddy Grant.

On 6 February 2009 De Greef won one of the 2008 Music Industry Awards (MIA), namely that in the category of best female artist ahead of Natalia, Sandrine and Kate Ryan. She was also nominated in the category "breakthrough of the year", and she immediately went home with the main prize. Later in that year, on 8 August, she received the Radio 2 Summer Hit-trophy in Westende.

On 8 January 2010 Lady Linn and Her Magnificent Seven won the MIA for best pop artist and that of best female solo artist. In 2012, their album No Goodbye at all became their second album to reach the golden status.

== Discography ==
Album(s) with hits in the Flemish Ultratop 50	Date of appearance	Date of entrance	Highest position	Number of weeks	Remarks
Here we go again	11 February 2008	16 February 2008	2	106	Platinum
No goodbye at all	29 April 2011	7 May 2011	3	20	Gold
High	2014	8 February 2014	14	2*	
Keep It a Secret	15 April 2016	23 April 2016	15	-	
Black Swan	9 November 2018	17 November 2018	29	-	

Single(s) with hits in the Flemish Ultratop 50	Date of appearance	Date of entrance	Highest position	Number of weeks	Remarks
A love affair	2008	15 November 2008	tip11	-	
I don't wanna dance	2009	21 March 2009	4	25	Nr. 1 in the Radio 2 Top 30
Cool down	2009	11 July 2009	tip7	-	
Here we go again	19 October 2009	31 October 2009	tip8	-	
Cry baby	28 February 2011	12 March 2011	tip8	-	
Little bird	16 May 2011	4 June 2011	tip14	-	
Over	17 October 2011	5 November 2011	tip29	-	
Everlasting	31 May 2019	6 July 2019	tip46	-	
