= Jumping the Tracks (The Scabs album) =

Studio album by The Scabs
- Released: 1991
- Genre: Punk rock

The Scabs chronology
Royalty in Exile (1990)	Jumping the Tracks (1991)

Jumping the Tracks is a 1991 album by the Belgian punk band The Scabs. The album was one of the two albums released at the peak of the band's popularity, following Royalty in Exile.

== Track list ==
1. Keep on Driving – 3'38
2. Robbin' The Liquor Store – 5'46
3. Don't You Know – 3'22
4. Tell Me About It – 4'14
5. Demons – 3'39
6. Nothing on My Radio – 4'50
7. Hello Lonesome – 3'26
8. Read the Magazine – 2'53
9. Hard to Forget – 2'53
10. You Got My Name, You Got My Number – 3'22
11. So – 4'07
12. Tracy – 4'15
