= A Brand =

Belgian rock group

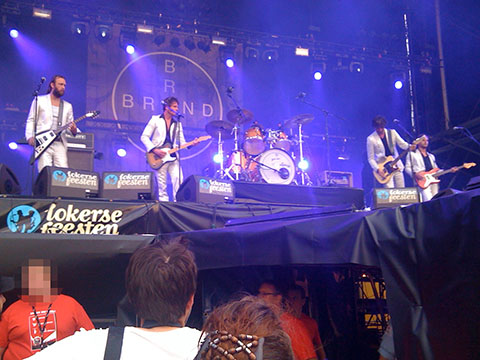
- A Brand at Lokerse Feesten in 2010

Background information
- Origin: Antwerp, Belgium
- Genres: Rock
- Years active: 2004–2013
- Labels: This Is Bang
- Members: Dag Taeldeman; Frederick Heuvinck; Tim Bekaert; Tom Vermeir; Frederik De Lepeleere

A Brand was a Belgian rock group featuring Dag Taeldeman, active until 2013. Their hits include "Riding Your Ghost", "Hammerhead", "Beauty Booty Killerqueen" and "Time".

== History ==
A Brand recorded their first album, 45 RPM, in a garage in 2004. "Riding Your Ghost" became their first single on alternative radio. In 2005 they performed on the Belgian festivals Dour, Zeverrock and Ackerrock; and in 2006 several others, including Rock Werchter and Pukkelpop. In the same year, they also released their second album, Hammerhead, and scored minor hits with "Hammerhead", "Beauty Booty Killerqueen" and "A Perfect Habitat For Foxes". In the summer of 2008, A Brand released their third album, Judas. In 2011, they released their fourth album, Future You. It featured the singles "What's taking you", "The Mud" and "For blood". A year later, they released a double CD. The first disc contained all of their fourteen released singles, including two new songs called "Christine" and "Humanoid", and a cover of AC/DC's "Thunderstruck". The second disc contained "Grammar", a one-hour mash-up of their most famous songs, recorded live at the Ancienne Belgique in Brussels in 2012.

== Line-up ==
- Dag Taeldeman: vocals, guitar
- Frederik Heuvinck: vocals, drums
- Frederik De Lepeleere: vocals, bass
- Tim Bekaert: vocals, guitar
- Tom Vermeir: vocals, guitar

== Discography ==
=== Studio albums ===
- 45 RPM (2004)
- Hammerhead (2006)
- Judas (2008)
- Future You (2011)
- A Brand: the singles (2012)

=== Singles ===
- Riding Your Ghost (2004)
- I Do As I Please (2005)
- Hammerhead (2006)
- Beauty Booty Killerqueen (2006)
- A Perfect Habitat For Foxes (2006)
- Time (2008)
- The Bubbles (2008)
- Mad Love, Sweet Love (2009)
- The Mud (2011)
- What's Taking you (2011)
