= Fleddy Melculy =

Flemish metal band

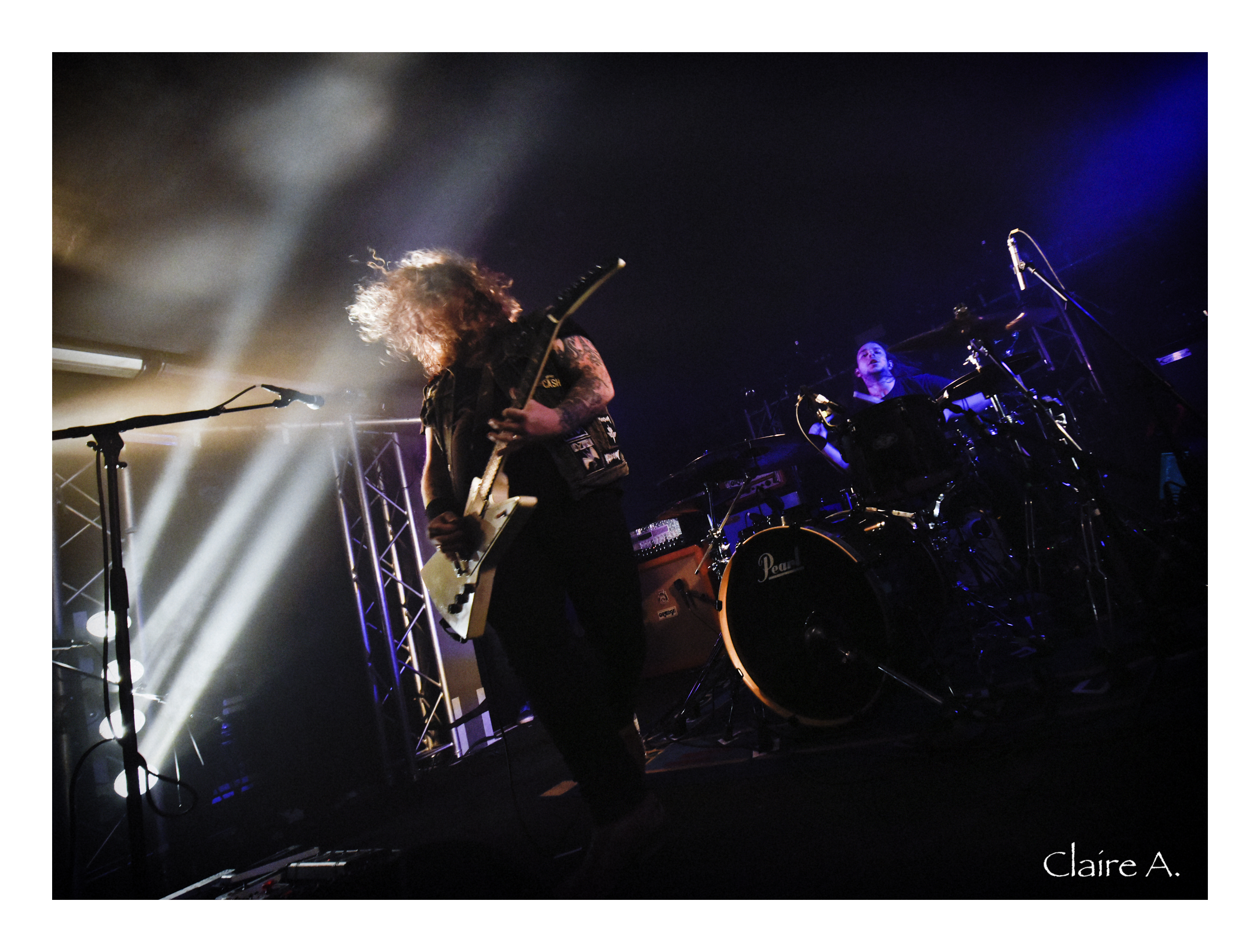

Fleddy Melculy is a Flemish metal band.

Fleddy Melculy started as a joke band created by Jeroen Camerlynck, who was active in the rock band De Fanfaar. The name (a play on Freddie Mercury) was deliberately silly.

Their debut single "T-shirt van Metallica" was an immediate success, and the band signed with Sony Music. In 2016 their first EP Wat de fok? and first album, Helgië, appeared, and the band played on Pukkelpop. In 2017 they played as opening act for Guns N' Roses at TW Classic.

Their debut album peaked at number two on the Belgian charts in 2016 and their second album, De kerk van Melculy, reached number one on the official Flemish charts in February 2018. Their concert that year at Graspop was released as a live album.

== Discography ==
Studio albums

- Helgië (2016) – No. 2 Belgium (Flanders)
- De kerk van Melculy (2018) – No. 1 Belgium (Flanders)
- Sabbath Fleddy Sabbath (2020) – No. 2 Belgium (Flanders)
- And Just Niks for All (2021) – No. 4 Belgium (Flanders)
- Antichlist (2023) – No. 1 Belgium (Flanders)
- L'avocat du diable (2026) – No. 5 Belgium (Flanders)
