= Betty Goes Green =

Belgian rock band

Betty Goes Green is a Belgian rock band founded in 1990.

== Biography ==
The group convinced Mike Rathke (producer and guitar player of Lou Reed) to produce their album Hunuluria, of which two good singles are taken: "Cold by the sea" and "Life Long Devotion".

Rathke also produces their album "Hand Some", on which Lou Reed also sings on one song. On the album, the guitars are being played by Tjenne Berghmans (Clouseau), due to a fatal illness of their original guitarist Pieter De Cort. He dies of cancer in 1994.

In 1996, the group decides to take a step down: they sign up for a smaller record label (B-Track) and record a new album. Their devoted friend Lou Reed is still enthusiastic and takes the group with him on his European Tour.

The single "The Well" becomes a huge radio hit. In 1998, singer Luc Crabbe en Tony Gezels also take part in a new project of Kloot Per W called "Zen-On".

The album Dreamers & Lovers was recorded in the band's own home studio, with only a brass section with Bart Maris coming to the aid of the band. Dreamers & Lovers got an international release in the Fall of 2000.

== Discography ==
=== Studioalbums ===
- Hell Of A Show (1991, Boom!)
- Hunaluria (1993, BMG/Ariola)
- Hand Some (1994, BMG)
- Hedonic Tone (1996, B-track)
- The Well (1998, Sony Columbia)
- Dreamers and Lovers (2000, B-track)

=== Singles ===
- Betty Goes Green (1991, Boom!)
- Cold By The sea (1993, BMG/Ariola)
- Life Long devotion (1993, BMG/Ariola)
- I Love It (1994, BMG)
- Go To Hook Her (1994, BMG)
- Ring Ring (1996, B-Track)
- Heimet (1997, Sony Columbia)
- The Well (1998, Sony Columbia
