= The Van Jets =

Belgian rock group

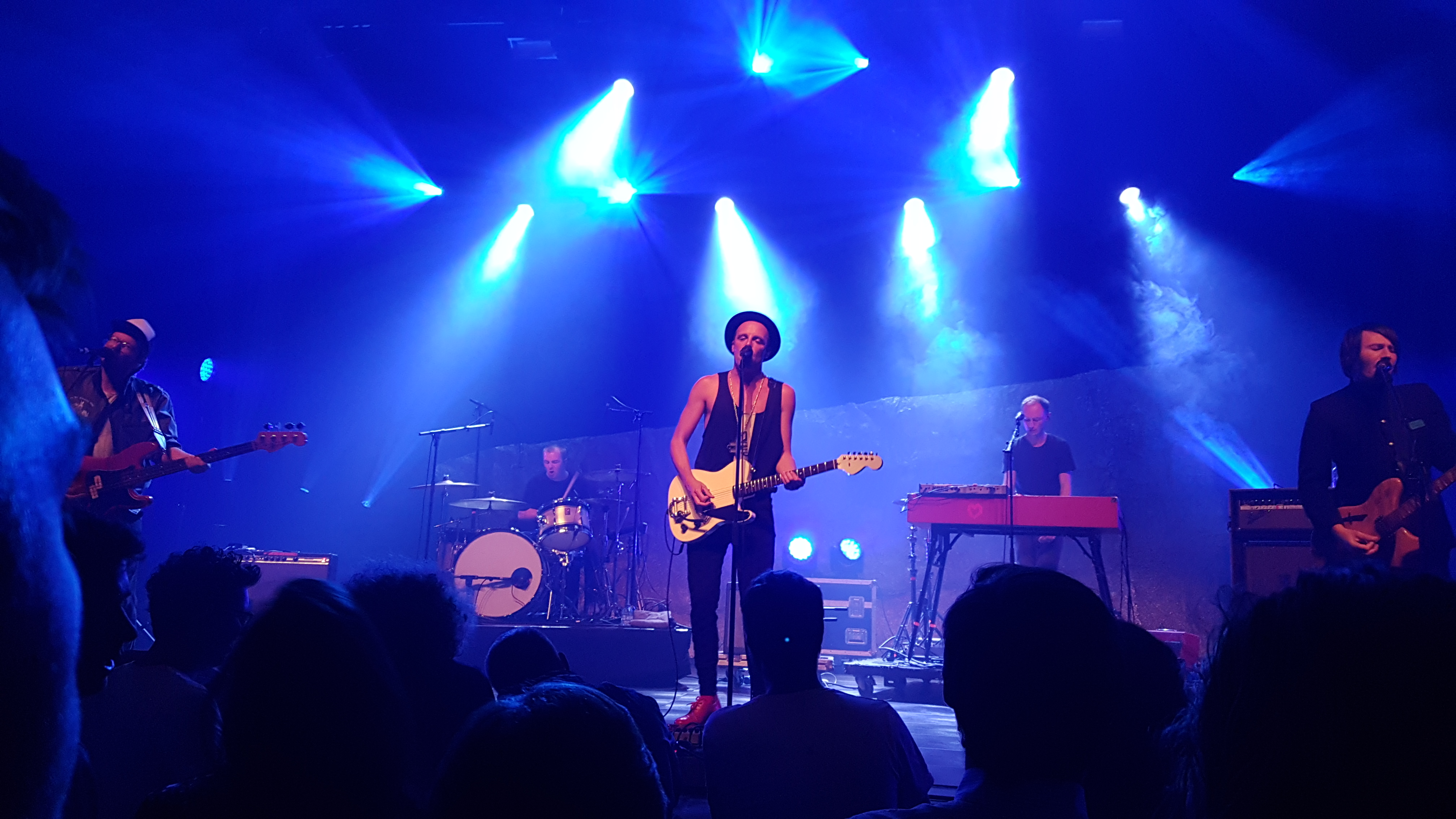
- The Van Jets in the AB, 2016

Background information
- Origin: Ostend, Belgium
- Genres: Garage rock, Pop rock, Glam rock, Rock and roll
- Years active: 2003–2019
- Labels: Belvédère, Sony
- Past members: Johannes Verschaeve; Michael Verschaeve; Wolfgang Vanwymeersch; Frederik Tampere; Floris De Decker
- Website: https://www.thevanjets.be/

The Van Jets was a rock band based in Ostend, Belgium.

Their style was a mixture of glam rock, rock 'n' roll, garage rock and pop. The band won Humo's Rock Rally in 2004, after they recorded their first EP, Belvedere Records Presents the Van Jets.

Their full-length debut, Electric Soldiers, was released in 2007. The Van Jets gained a reputation as a thrilling live act following performances at Rock Werchter and Pukkelpop.

After the release of the albums Cat Fit Fury! and Halo, they switched to a more synth pop style. The album Welcome to Strange Paradise was realized with the cooperation of producer Leo Abrahams and acclaimed mixing engineer Tchad Blake. Blake also mixed Future Primitives, released in 2017.

The band broke up in 2019. Johannes Verschaeve continued as a solo-artist called Johannes Is Zijn Naam (Johannes Is His Name). His first album released in 2023 consisted of Flemish-language songs.

== Discography ==
=== EPs ===
- The Van Jets (2005)

=== Studio albums ===
- Electric Soldiers (2007)
- Cat Fit Fury! (2010)
- Halo (2012)
- Welcome to Strange Paradise (2015)
- Future Primitives (2017)
