= The Sore Losers =

Belgian rock band

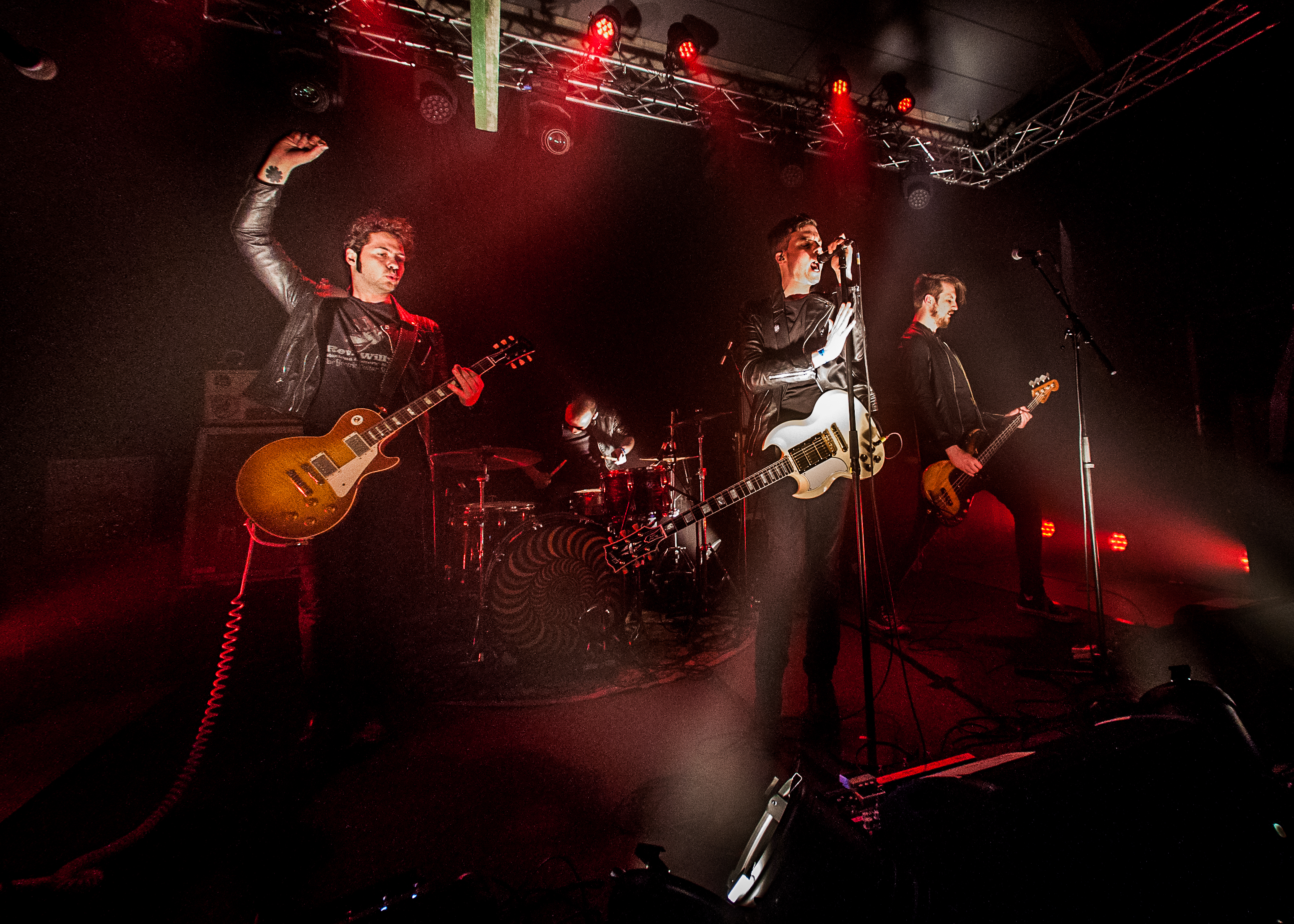
- The Sore Losers 2016 © Damien Thonnon

Background information
- Origin: Hasselt, Belgium
- Genres: Blues rock, rock
- Years active: 2009–2023
- Label: Suburban Records
- Members: Jan Straeteman (vocals); Cedric Maes (guitar); Kevin Maenen (bass); Alessio Di Turi (drums)
- Website: http://www.thesorelosers.be

The Sore Losers is a Belgian rock band, formed in 2009. Jan Straetemans (vocals, guitar), Cedric Maes (guitar), Kevin Maenen (bass) en Alessio Di Turi (drums) combined their love for rock, country, blues and garage and brewed it into a raw and pure rock sound of their own.

== History ==
The Sore Losers made it to the finals of the Belgian contest Humo's Rock Rally on 28 March 2010. The band signed a deal with Excelsior Recordings that led to the recording of their first and self titled album in October 2010. The first single "Beyond Repair" spent 21 weeks in De Afrekening on Studio Brussel and tied for the longest run on the show in 2010. The band played at Pukkelpop 2010 and were invited to open the main stage in 2011. Not long after their show the festival was cancelled due to damage caused by severe storms which killed five people.

The Sore Losers released their second album Roslyn in February 2014, reaching number 5 in the Ultratop albums chart and spent 52 weeks in the chart. The three following singles "Working Overtime", "Don't Know Nothing" and "Tripper" became number 1 in De Afrekening and Hotlist charts from Studio Brussel. In July 2014, the band played at Rock Werchter and on 20 December 2014, they sold out their first headline show at Ancienne Belgique, which was broadcast on Acht. The Sore Losers were nominated for the Belgian Music Industry Awards 2014 in the categories 'Alternative' and 'Breakthrough Artist'. The album was released on 20 February 2015 in Germany, Switzerland and Austria, followed by a German club tour together with Triggerfinger.

In November 2015, the band went into the Vox Ton studios in Berlin with Grammy award-winning producer Dave Cobb for ten days to record their third album, Skydogs. The album came out on 18 March 2016 to critical acclaim in Benelux. The group’s sound is described as a raw blend of the early Black Sabbath, Jack White, The Stooges and The Black Keys, continuously in search of the essence of rock and psychedelia. They sold-out another headline release show at Ancienne Belgique on 15 April 2016. In France, Stéphane Saunier chose the album as "Album de la semaine" in his television program on Canal+ and The Sore Losers presented Skydogs for a live audience in a Parisian TV-studio. Also in France, Philippe Manoeuvre, editor-in-chief of the Rock & Folk Magazine, chose Skydogs as "Best Album of 2016". The Sore Losers supported the album with an extensive tour through France, as support act for bands like White Denim, Boss Hog, The Bellrays and Lords of Altamont, and later as headliner of their own tour.

In March 2017, The Sore Losers crossed the Atlantic for the first time, to introduce themselves to the music industry in New York and at SXSW in Austin, Texas. The single "Nightcrawler" premiered on TeamCoco, the online platform of Late Night Show host Conan O'Brien. The magazine Guitar World launched the live video for "Nightcrawler" through their website.

In 2018, the band released Gracias Señor, their fourth album, on Ultra Elektric Records, their own record label. The album was recorded in the new DAFT Studio and produced by James Petralli and Steve Terebecki of the American rock band White Denim. Gracias Señor was distributed in Benelux and France by Caroline Music. In 2018, the band played at the Belgian festival Pukkelpop, followed by a sold out tour.

On 22 October 2021, The Sore Losers released their fifth studio album Ultra Elektric on Suburban Records. The album was recorded between June 2020 and April 2021 in GAM, DAFT and Ultra Elektric Studios, which is the band's own recording studio.

== Influences ==
The Sore Losers are influenced by blues rock bands from the 1960s-1970s, particularly bands such as MC5, Led Zeppelin and The Yardbirds. The band name is inspired by the same titled cult movie from director John M. McCarthy. The title of their third album Skydogs is a reference to Duane Allman's nickname.

== Discography ==
=== Albums ===
- 2010: The Sore Losers (Excelsior Recordings/V2)
- 2014: Roslyn (Excelsior Recordings/V2)
- 2016: Skydogs (Excelsior Recordings/V2)
- 2018: Gracias Señor (Ultra Elektric Records / Caroline Music)
- 2022: Ultra Elektric (Suburban Records)

=== Singles ===
- 2010: "Beyond Repair"
- 2014: "Working Overtime", "Don't Know Nothing", "Tripper"
- 2016: "Cherry Cherry", "Emily", "Got It Bad"
- 2018: "Dark Ride", "Eyes On The Prize"
