= School Is Cool =

Belgian baroque-pop band

School is Cool
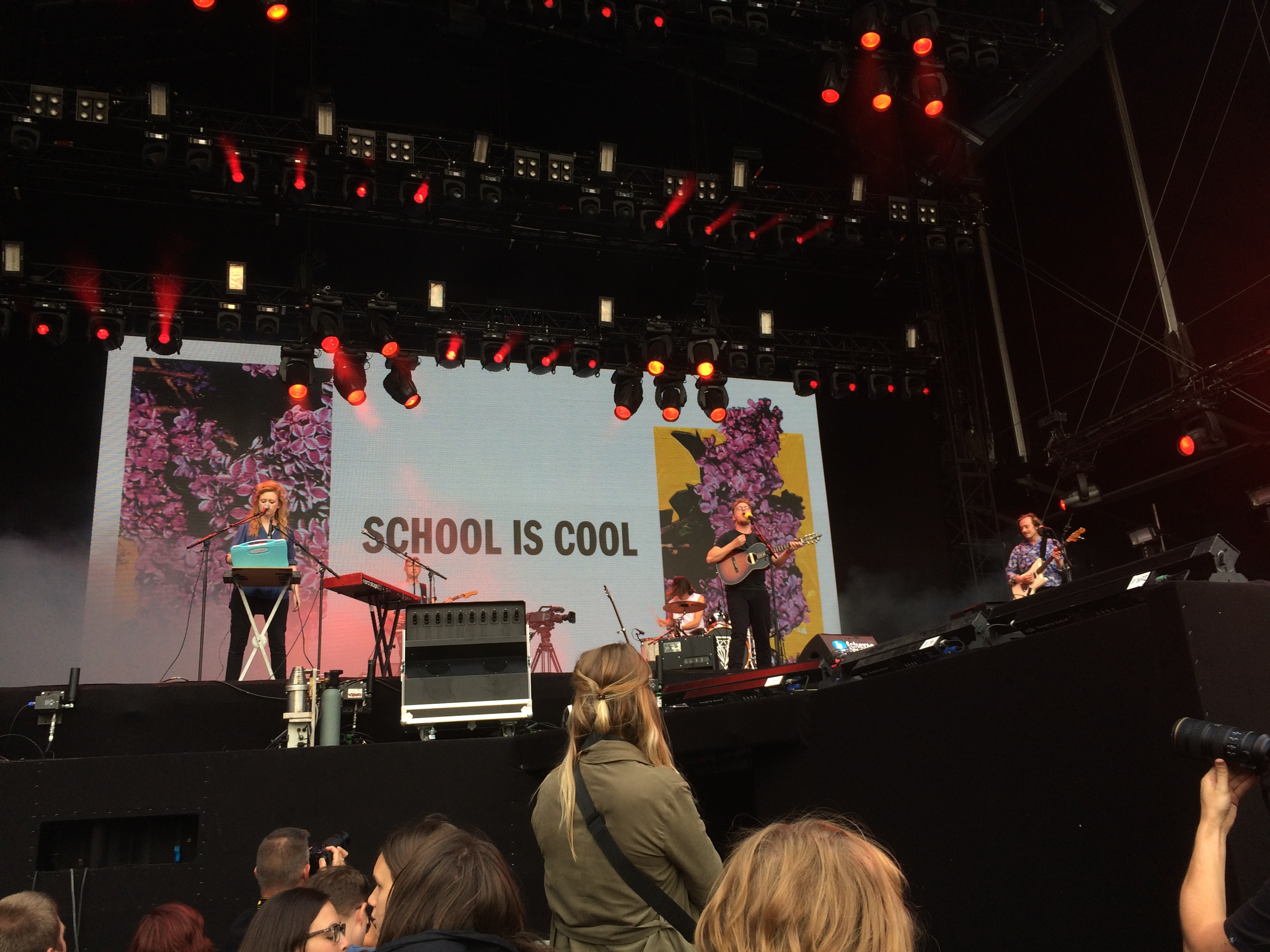

Background information
- Origin: Antwerp, Belgium
- Genres: Indie pop, baroque pop
- Years active: 2009-present
- Members: Johannes Genard (lead vocals, guitar, synths); Matthias Dillen (drums); Toon Van Baelen (bass guitar, synths); Hanne Torfs (synths, vocals); Justine Bourgeus (violin, synths, vocals)
- Past members: Nele Paelinck (violon, synths, vocals); Michael Van Ostade (bass guitar); Andrew Van Ostade (percussion, synths)
- Website: www.schooliscool.be

School is Cool is a Belgian baroque-pop band founded in September 2009.

On 28 November 2009 School is Cool won the audience award and the third prize awarded by the jury on 'FrappantPOP', an Antwerp initiative searching for promising new musicians. This was their third performance with five members in the band.

Only four months later, 28 March 2010, the band was declared winner of Humo's Rock Rally, an important Belgian Rock contest that previously introduced dEUS, Das Pop and The Black Box Revelation, among others.

School is Cool introduced their debut single "New Kids in Town" on Belgian national radio, Studio Brussel, on 22 April 2010, and they produced their own video clip on a limited budget. The single was number one for six weeks in the radio chart, De Afrekening.

In the summer of 2010 School is Cool started performing on countless festivals all over Belgium, these included Genk On Stage, Cirque@taque, Boomtown, Dranouter, Marktrock, Maanrock and Pukkelpop, all with hugely positive reviews.

On 18 October 2011 School is Cool launched their debut album Entropology. They kicked off their Belgian tour in their home-town Antwerp and played in major concert halls, including Ancienne Belgique in Brussels and Vooruit in Ghent. They also performed in The Dublin Castle (16 May 2011) and The Bowery (24 November 2011) in London, in l'International (24 May 2011) in Paris and The Netherlands. Other singles released from the album are "In Want of Something" and "The World Is Gonna End Tonight". "The World Is Gonna End Tonight" topped the Belgian chart, De Afrekening, for three weeks. This single and the song "The Underside" also made it to the UK national radio on Radio 1 and Radio 6.

On 24 March 2014 their second album was released, called Nature Fear. The receptions were good overall, with the album be called 'darker' and 'more mature' than their first one. The first single is called "Wide Eyed & Wild Eyed".

== Discography ==
=== Albums ===
- Entropology (released 18 October 2011)
- Nature Fear (released 21 March 2014)
- Good News (released 22 September 2017)
- Things That Don't Go Right (released 6 March 2020)
- Brittle Dream (released 28 October 2022)

=== Singles ===
- "New Kids in Town" (released 17 May 2010)
- "In Want of Something" (released 23 May 2011)
- "The World Is Gonna End Tonight" (released 29 August 2011)
- "Warpaint" (released 6 February 2012)
- "The Underside" (released 14 May 2012)
- "Wide Eyed & Wild Eyed" (released 2014)
- "If So" (released 2015)
- "Trophy Wall" (released 2017)
- "Fight of the century" (released 2017)
- "Run Run Run Run Run " (released 2017)
- "I’m not fine" (released 2018)
- "Good news (Loft edition)" (released 2018)
- "Close" (released 2019)
- "Thing that don’t go right" (released 2020)
- "On the halfway line" (released 2020)
- "Comfort" (released 2022)
- "Uh-Huh" (released 2022)
