= Oscar and the Wolf =

Belgian musician

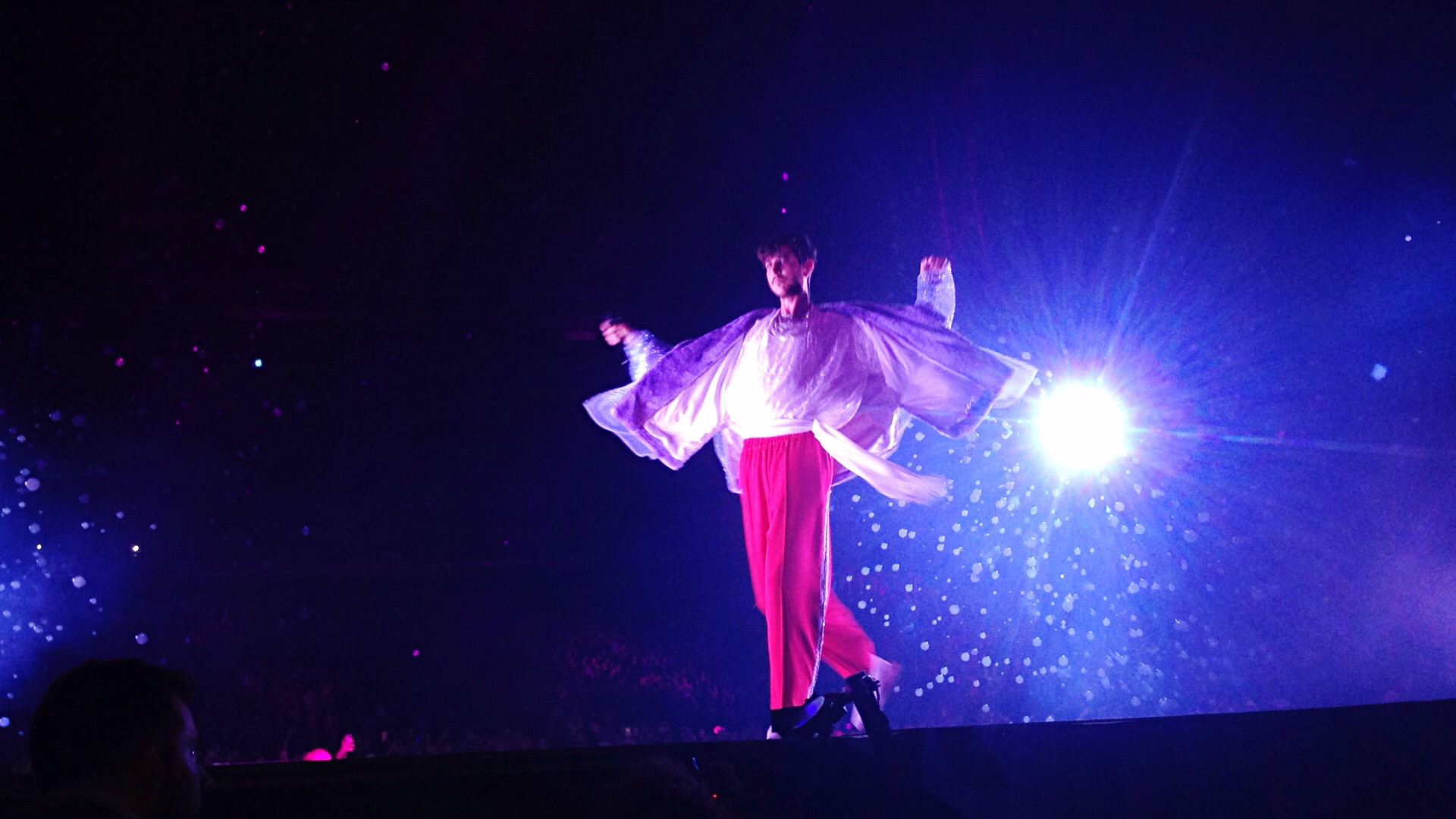
- Oscar and the Wolf live

Background information
- Origin: Belgium
- Genres: Electropop, dream pop, indie rock, baroque pop
- Years active: 2010–present
- Labels: Play It Again Sam, Neon Gold Records
- Members: Max Colombie
- Website: oscarandthewolf.com

Oscar and the Wolf is the moniker for Belgian solo artist Max Colombie.

== Life and career ==
Oscar and the Wolf first gained international attention with the single "Orange Sky" in 2013, which got them support slots for the likes of Lou Reed, but gained critical acclaim and success with debut album Entity, released in April 2014. This album departed from the sound of Colombie's indie folk EPs and ventured into a new electronic sound. It was the first time Max Colombie took control, and the album was co-produced and mixed by Leo Abrahams.

'Entity' includes the tracks "Princes", "Undress" and "Strange Entity". It was received reviews in Belgium and abroad, including praise from Drowned in Sound and Les Inrocks, and went double platinum in Belgium.

'The Game', the first single off his second album, was released in July 2016. It peaked at n° 14 on the Hype Machine chart.

In 2015, after extensive touring across Europe, including a support tour for Roisin Murphy, Oscar and the Wolf sold out Sportpaleis (Antwerp, Belgium) and Heineken Music Hall (Amsterdam, Netherlands), with a total of 27000 tickets. In 2016, after headlining Pukkelpop festival, he sold out both Ancienne Belgique (Brussels, Belgium) and Paradiso (Amsterdam) in just 4 minutes. He announced new shows at Sportpaleis and Heineken Music Hall immediately after.

In an interview with Pi-Pôle, Max revealed the meaning behind his band's name: "Oscar is a name I really like – it's poetic and light. And wolf is the dark animal that comes out at night and howls to the full moon, and moon stands for solitude and coldness. It's bright and dark together, because that's how I see my music – as a balance between light and dark."

== Discography ==
=== Studio albums ===
List of studio albums, with selected details
Title	Album details	Peak chart positions				Certifications
Title	Album details	BEL (FL)	BEL (WA)	FRA	NLD	Certifications
Entity	Released: 25 April 2014; Label: PIAS; Format: CD, digital download	1	11	—	8	BEA: 2× Platinum; NVPI: Gold
Infinity	Released: 29 September 2017; Label: PIAS; Format: CD, digital download	1	4	178	6	BEA: Gold
The Shimmer	Released: 22 October 2021; Label: PIAS; Format: CD, digital download, streaming	1	8	—	23	
Taste	Released: 25 October 2024; Label: PIAS; Format: CD, digital download, streaming	2	34	—	43	

=== Extended plays ===
Title	Details	Peak chart positions	
Title	Details	BEL (FL)	BEL (WA)
Imagine Mountains	Released: 2010; Label: Self-released; Formats: CD	—	—
Summer Skin	Released: 24 June 2012; Label: PIAS; Formats: 12-inch record, CD	—	—
Afterglow	Released: 10 June 2022; Label: PIAS; Formats: Digital download, streaming	108	—
Jardin (with Roméo Elvis)	Released: 12 December 2025; Label: Uforia, Strauss; Formats: Digital download, streaming	26	10

=== Singles ===
List of singles by main artist
Title	Year	Peak chart positions			Certifications	Album
Title	Year	BEL (FL)	BEL (WA)	FRA	Certifications	Album
"Orange Sky"	2012	85	—	—		Summer Skin
"Princes"	2014	18	7	—	BEA: Platinum	Entity
"Strange Entity"	2014	4	15	—	BEA: Platinum	Entity
"Undress"	2014	52	—	—		Entity
"Joaquim"	2014	39	—	—		Entity
"You're Mine" (featuring Raving George)	2015	2	5	—		Non-album single
"Back to Black (Film Black Version)" (featuring Tsar B)	2015	3	10	—	BEA: Gold	Black (Music From the Motion Picture)
"The Game"	2016	12	54	—		Non-album single
"So Real"	2017	34	72	—		Infinity
"Breathing"	2017	6	49	105	BEA: Gold	Infinity
"Runaway"	2017	17	58	—		Infinity
"Fever"	2018	27	72	—		Infinity
"On Fire"	2018	24	—	—		Non-album single
"James"	2021	32	—	—		The Shimmer
"Oliver"	2021	43	—	—		The Shimmer
"Livestream"	2021	46	—	—		The Shimmer
"Warrior"	2022	1	—	—	BEA: Platinum	Taste
"Angel Face"	2024	5	41	—	BEA: Platinum	Taste
"Somebody Without U"	2024	14	—	—	BEA: Gold	Taste
"Oh Boy"	2024	—	—	—		Taste
"Spill My Liquor"	2024	50	—	—		Taste
"Ceiling" (with Roméo Elvis)	2025	—	44	—		Jardin
"Safe and Sound" (with S10)	2026	39	—	—		Non-album single
"—" denotes items which were not released in that country or failed to chart.
