= The Scabs =

Belgian rock band

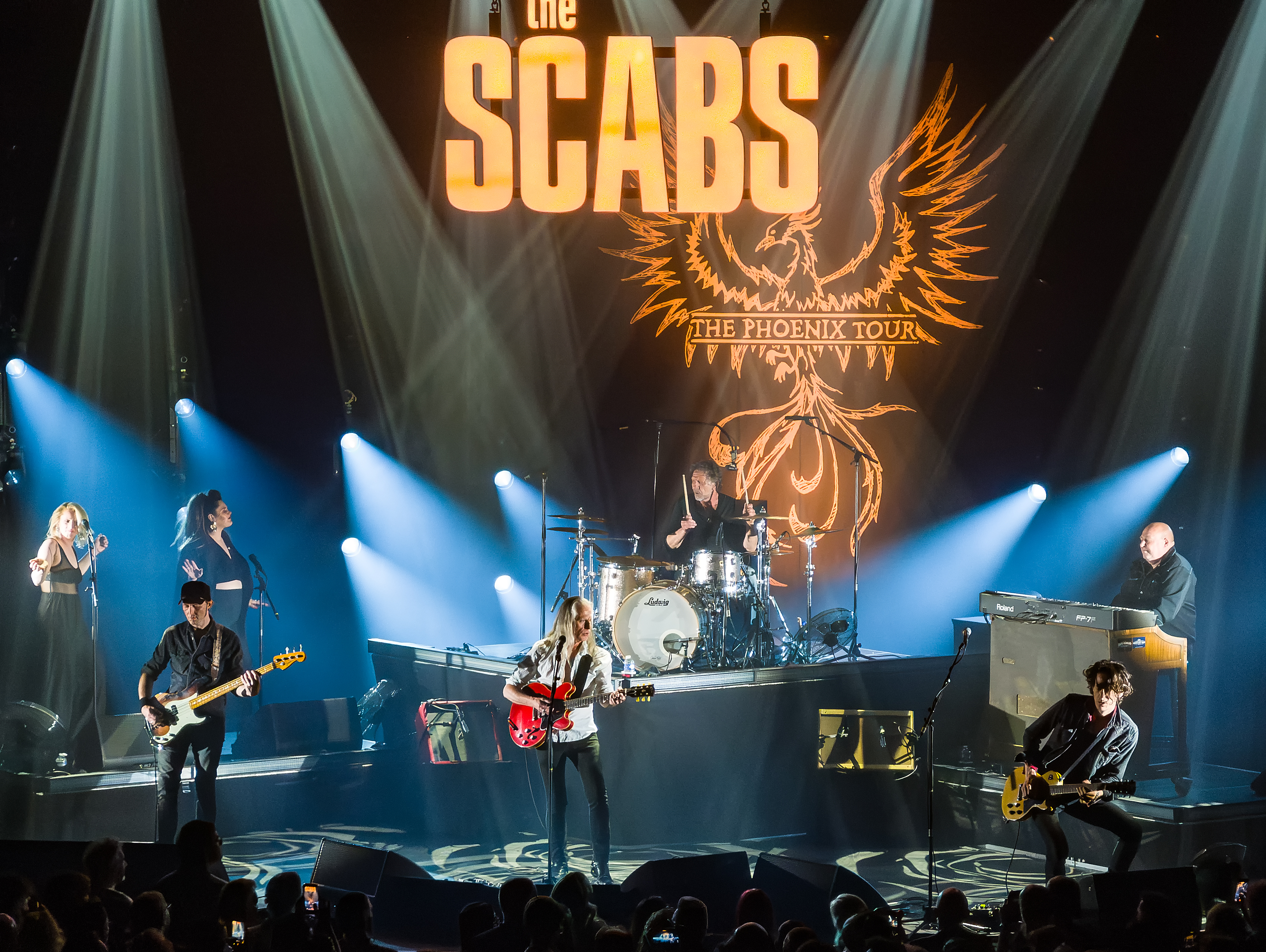
- The Scabs in Ancienne Belgique, 2026

Background information
- Origin: Belgium
- Genres: Rock, pop, punk
- Years active: 1984–1996, 2007–present
- Labels: EMI, Play It Again Sam
- Members: Guy Swinnen; Frankie Saenen; Geert Schurmans; David Piedfort; Patrick Cuyvers; Fabio Canini
- Past members: Fons Sijmons, Wim Van Deuren, Francis Vangeel, Berre Bergen, Tjenne Berghmans, Mark Lakke Vanbinst, Jan Hautekiet, Willy Willy, Kiu Jerome, Marie-Ange Teuwen, Piet Van den Heuvel
- Website: thescabs.be

The Scabs are a Belgian punk rock group. They are best known for their hit singles "Matchbox Car" (1983) and "Hard Times" (1991), which have become classics on Belgian radio.

== History ==
The band was founded in Diest in 1979. The original core members were Guy Swinnen (vocals/guitar), Berre Bergen (bass), Francis Vangeel (guitar) and Frankie Saenen (drums). In 1983 Vangeel was replaced by Mark Lakke Vanbinst who left two years later to join the band La Fille d'Ernest. His replacement was Willy Willy, a former member of Vaya Con Dios. In 1989, Fons Sijmons replaced Berre Bergen, who joined De Kreuners.

The Scabs achieved their greatest success with their third album, Royalty in Exile (1990), earning a gold disc, and the album Jumping the Tracks (1991). In 1994 Willy Willy left the group and was replaced by Tjenne Berghmans. In 1996 the group was disbanded. They started touring again in 2007.

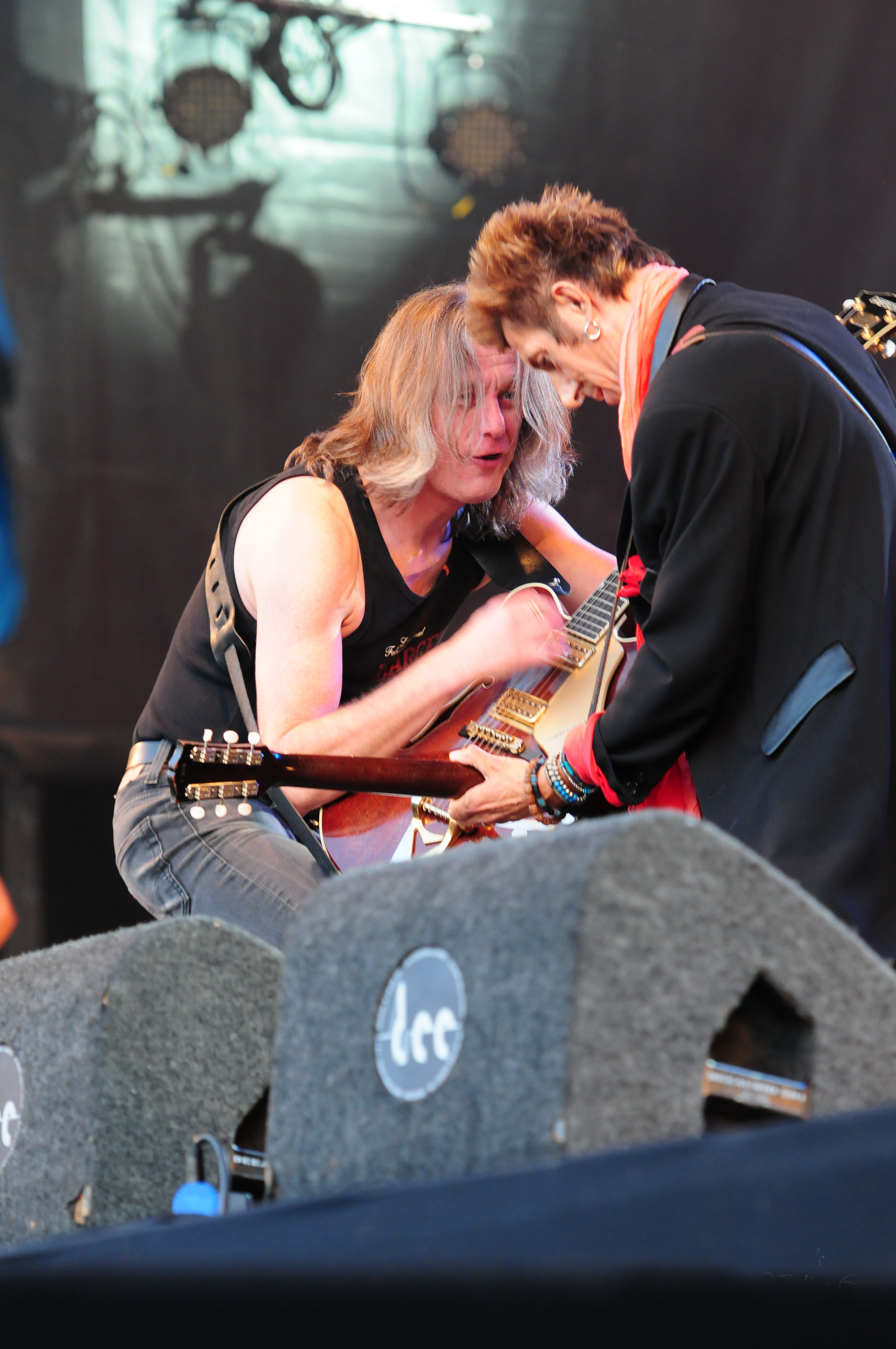
The Scabs performing in 2012

Three of the members are dead; Sijmons died on 18 July 2013 from lung cancer and Korsakov's syndrome, Bergen died of emphysema on 7 February 2016, and Willy died from cancer at the age of 59 on 13 February 2019.

== Albums ==
- Here's to you gang (1983) - EP
- For all the wolf calls (1984)
- Rockery (1986)
- Skintight (1988)
- Gangbang + Rockery (1989) - compilation of earlier work
- Royalty in Exile (1990)
- Jumping the Tracks (1991)
- Dog days are over (1993)
- Inbetweenies (1993) - mini-compilation plus new tracks
- Live dog (1993) - live
- Odds & Outtakes (1993) - mini-compilation plus new tracks
- Sunset over wasteland (1995)
- Ways Of A Wild Heart (2015) - majority of tracks written by drummer Frank Saenen
