= Dour Festival =

Annual music festival celebrated in Dour, Belgium

Coordinates: 50°24′19″N 3°46′29″E

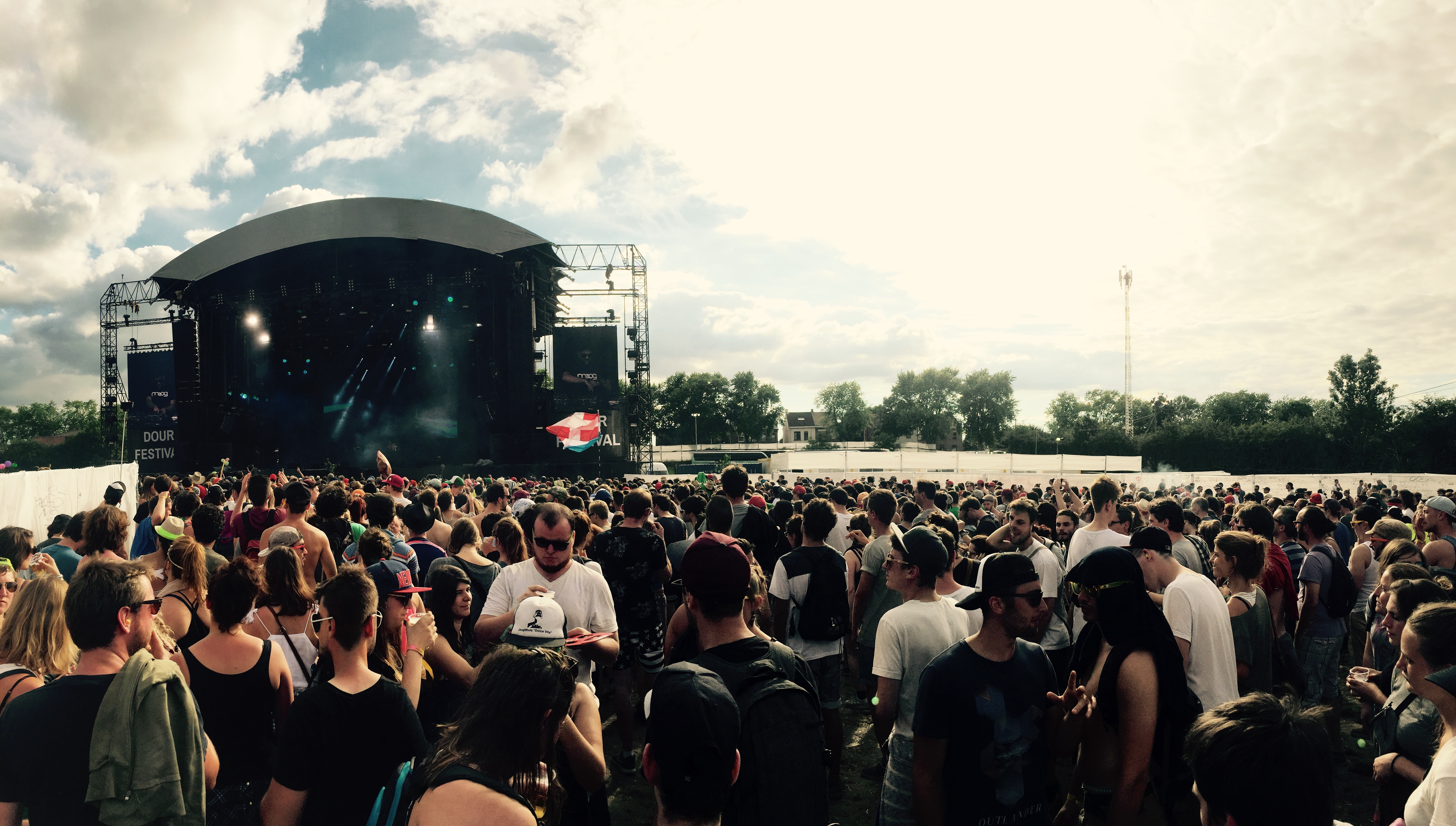
- 2016 festival
- Genre: Various genres
- Dates: 17–21 July (2024)
- Locations: Dour, Belgium
- Years active: 1988–present
- Attendance: 242,000
- Capacity: 55,000
- Website: link

Dour Festival is an annual music festival in the municipality of Dour, Belgium. Since its creation in 1988, the festival has grown to an attendance of about 225,000 in 2015 (over 5 days). The first year, only five bands were programmed (including Bernard Lavilliers). The festival format now consists of 5 days, 9 stages and more than 280 bands and DJs. The festival's acts come from a wide range of genres, such as: electro, rock, drum and bass, pop, R&B, reggae, house, punk, hardcore, metal, hip-hop, indie, techno, and more. Music is played for 17 hours each day, from 12pm until 5am. The festival attracts a very international and mixed crowd, at the 2009 event 40% of attendees were from Wallonia or Brussels, 32% Flanders, 16% France, 5% the Netherlands, 5% the United Kingdom and 2% elsewhere. In January 2010, Dour Festival won the prize for the best medium-sized festival at the European Festival Awards.

== Stages ==
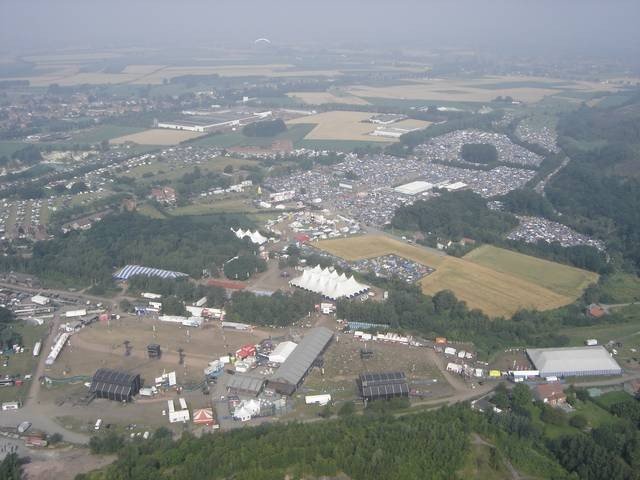
Aerial view of the site

The festival typically has the following stages:

- The Last Arena (main stage)
- Dance Hall (mostly electronic music)
- Jupiler Boombox (rap, hip-hop, soul and R'n'B)
- La Petite Maison dans la Prairie (mostly indie rock)
- La Caverne (mostly punk and heavy metal)
- Red Bull Elektropedia Balzaal (dancefloor; mostly techno, drum 'n' bass and dubstep)
- Dub Corner (dubplates)
- Le Labo (experimental scene)
- La Cubanisto Dancing (only in 2016, different genres every day)

== History ==
The first festival was held on September 16, 1989. The festival lasted just the one day, with only one stage and only French Speaking Bands. 2,000 people attended the inaugural event. The 1990 festival was of the same format but come 1991 the festival was spread across 2 days and a record 15 bands. In 1992 the festival went back to its original one day format, and attracted a record crowd of 4,000. Come 1993 and Dour Festival really started to grow, with 3 stages, 32 bands and 9,000 spectators over two days. In 1994, Dour welcomed the likes of Pulp and Blur, which helped draw 15,000. For 1995 only the festival was held over 3 days playing host to The Ramones, Public Enemy and 78 other acts and almost tripling its attendance to 43,000.

The current festival format (over 4 days) was first held in 1996 and has constantly been growing ever since reaching a current attendance of around 150,000 each year.
