= Les Ardentes =

Annual rock festival in Liège, Belgium

Coordinates: 50.6531°N 5.6108°E

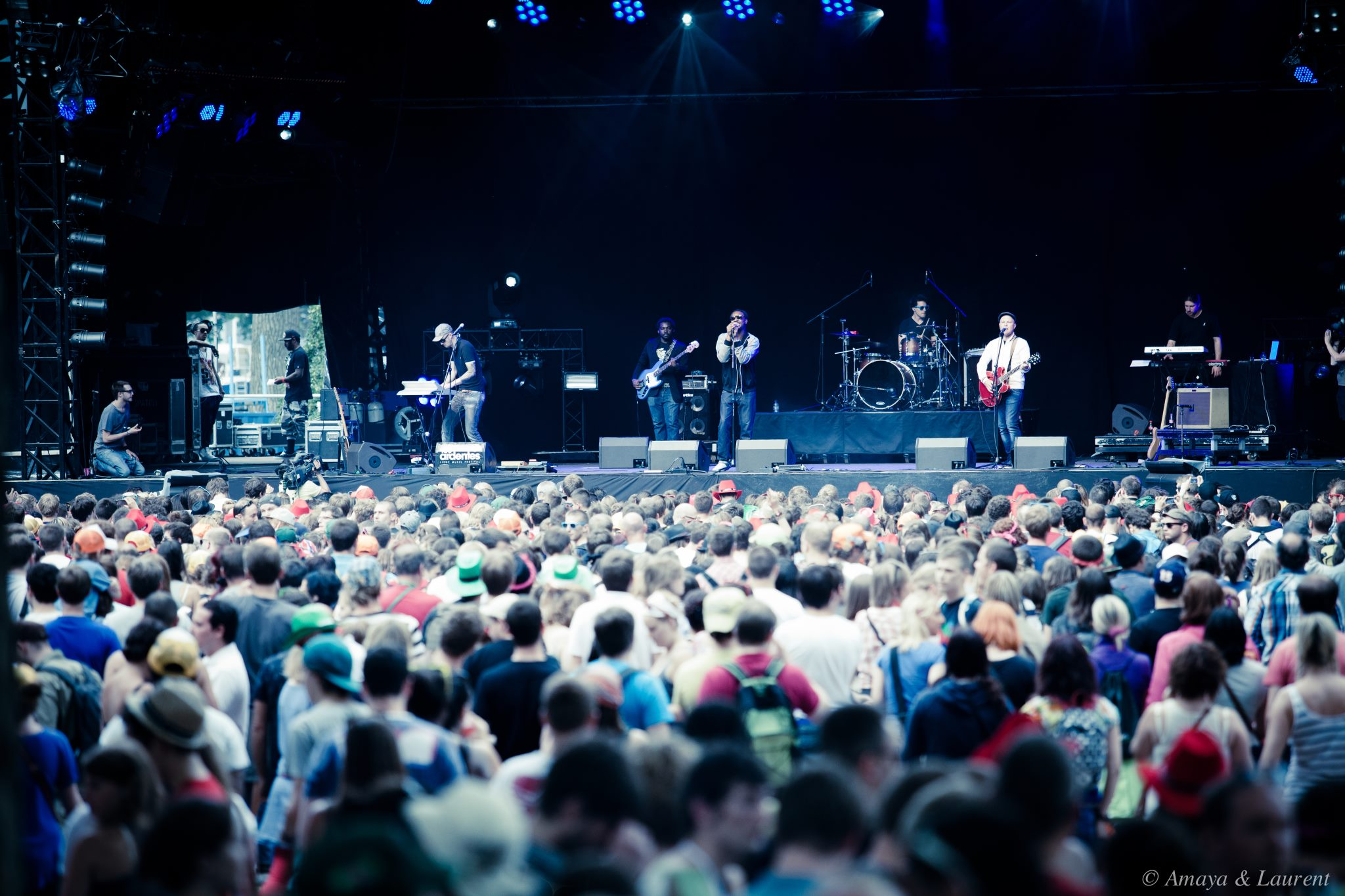
- Genre: Electro; Rock
- Dates: Early July
- Locations: Liège, Wallonia, Belgium
- Years active: 2006 – present
- Organiser: Fabrice Lamproie; Gaëtan Servais
- Website: www.lesardentes.be

Les Ardentes (French pronunciation: [lezaʁdɑ̃t]) or Ardentes are a Belgian multi-day electro-rock music festival which yearly takes place in Liège, in early July. The last edition of the event took place in the district of Rocourt. Les Ardentes is organized ever since 2006, with Fabrice Lamproie and Gaëtan Servais as founders. The festival name is a French plural noun meaning "The Burning", a referral to the nickname of host city Liège, La cité ardente ("The Burning City").

Les Ardentes is one of the major festivals in the Meuse–Rhine Euroregion (formed by parts of Belgium, Germany and the Netherlands). Attendance rose from 25,000 spectators at the first event to 200,000 in 2022. Since 2008, it is a four-day event whereas before, it lasted for three days. Les Ardentes has different stages on which the artists perform, the largest being situated in the centre of the park and others situated in the Halles des foires ("fair halls"). The festival is easily accessible by public transport—bus or train.

Programming was expanded to include general pop, French chanson, and indie acts during the early 2010s. In 2015, Les Ardentes welcomed rapper Kendrick Lamar, cementing the festival's shift towards including rap, hip-hop, and various styles of urban music.

From July 2, 2026 to July 5, 2026, Les Ardentes celebrated its 20th anniversary. Nearly 270,000 people attended the festival over the course of four days.

== Featured performers ==
Notable performers at previous festivals included:

- 2006: Indochine, TTC, Modeselektor, Sven Väth, Juan Atkins, Zita Swoon, Echo & the Bunnymen, Mad Professor + Omar Perry + Kenny Knots, Montevideo, Nada Surf, CocoRosie and The Nits.
- 2007: Arid, Zita Swoon, Air, Vive la Fête, Cassius, Apparat with Ellen Allien, The Hacker, Robert Hood, Ricardo Villalobos, !!!, Clinic, Infadels, Ghinzu, Martin Solveig, The Datsuns, Absynthe Minded, Joey Starr, DJ Krush, Daan, The Tellers, Mud Flow, Archive and Hooverphonic.
- 2008: Laurent Garnier, Yael Naim, Trentemøller (liveset), Flogging Molly, Cypress Hill, Sebastien Tellier, Arsenal, Shameboy, Yelle, Cansei de Ser Sexy, Booka Shade, Goose, Dr. Lektroluv, Andrew Weatherall, Dave Clarke, Derrick May, M.A.N.D.Y., Freaky Age, Tim Vanhamel, Das Pop, Dizzee Rascal, The Streets, Groove Armada, Liars, The Kills, The Mars Volta, The Bloody Beetroots, Calvin Harris, Noisia, Sage Francis, Puggy, Nada Surf, Arno, Alain Bashung, The Cinematic Orchestra and The Dandy Warhols.
- 2009: The Bony King of Nowhere, Herman Dune, Emiliana Torrini, Kid Cudi, Mogwai, Grandmaster Flash, Sonar, Madcon, The Rakes, Method Man & Redman, Q-tip, Etienne de Crécy, The Subs, Para One, Paul Kalkbrenner, Adam Beyer, The Hickey Underworld, Art Brut, Triggerfinger, Peaches, Tricky, Kool Shen, Magnus, Fink, IAMX, Amon Tobin, Caspa, Skream, Benga, DJ Mehdi, Erol Alkan, Mylo, Alela Diane, Ozark Henry, Gabriella Cilmi, Peter Bjorn and John, The Subways, Cold War Kids, Supergrass and Ghinzu.
- 2010: Jamie Lidell, Julian Casablancas, Cypress Hill, Pavement, The Tellers, Broken Social Scene, Crystal Castles, Morcheeba, Missy Elliott, Midnight Juggernauts, Audio Bullys, Just Jack, N.E.R.D., Tocadisco, The Shoes, Busy P, Zombie Nation, Tiga, Crystal Fighters, The Black Box Revelation, Babyshambles, Charlotte Gainsbourg, Erykah Badu, Ben Harper & Relentless 7, Isbells, Tunng, Nada Surf, SebastiAn, Adam Green, Yacht, Everlast, Jose James, Selah Sue, Nouvelle Vague, Heather Nova, Sarah Blasko, Archive and PiL.
- 2011: Dune, Triggerfinger, Ziggy Marley, Selah Sue, Connan Mockasin, These New Puritans, Stromae, The Human League, Kelis, Das Pop, Sum 41, Goose, Wu-Tang Clan, Limp Bizkit, Yuksek, The Subs, Dr. Lektroluv, Joris Voorn, Vanishing Point, Balthazar, Carl Barât, The Subways, Kate Nash, Cake, Snoop Dogg, Joan As Police Woman, Darkstar, Flux Pavilion, An Pierle, Staff Benda Bilili, Katerine, Agnes Obel, Guillemots, Keziah Jones, Puggy, Ozark Henry and Mika.
- 2012: 50 Cent, Absynthe Minded, Cypress Hill, Death In Vegas, Divine, Far East Movement, I Blame Coco, Joeystarr, Kavinsky, M83, Madeon, Marilyn Manson, Milow, Morning Parade, Morrissey, Patti Smith, School is Cool, Shearwater, The Hickey Underworld, The Jon Spencer Blues Explosion, The Ting Tings, Warpaint, White Lies and Yeasayer.
- 2013: -M-, dEUS, Mika, Steve Aoki, Kaiser Chiefs, Arno, Hooverphonic with Orchestra, Lou Doilon, BB Brunes, Miguel, Feed Me, Dada Life, Digitalism dj set, IAMX, Oxmo Puccino, 1995, Disiz, Soldout, Stupeflip, Trixie Whitley, The Raveonettes, Eiffel, An Pierlé, The Maccabees, Alex Hepburn, DJ Hype, Superlux, Balthazar, and Vismets.
- 2014: Massive Attack, Stromae, Placebo, Wiz Khalifa, M.I.A., Rita Ora, Earl Sweatshirt, Caribou, Booka Shade, Todd Terje, Agoria, Yellow Claw, Zeds Dead, Milky Chance, Banks, Fanfarlo, Palma Violets, Daughters, Benjamin Clementine, Danny Brown, and IAM.
- 2015: Kendrick Lamar, Niki Minaj, A$AP Rocky, D'Angelo, Iggy Pop, The Hives, Metronomy, Flatbush Zombies, Logic, Starflam, Paul Kalkbrenner, Oscar and the Wolf, Temples, Great Mountain Fire, Nekfeu, La Smala, and Atomic Spliff.
- 2016: Indochine, Hyphen Hyphen, Pharrell Williams, Suede, Cat Power, Future, AaRON, Lily Wood and the Prick, Tyler, The Creator, DJ Shadow, Flying Lotus, Action Bronson, Angel Haze, Snarky Puppy, Kamasi Washington, Kurt Vile & The Violators, Caribbean Dandee, and Compact Disk Dummies.
- 2026: Playboy Carti, Future, Aya Nakamura, Black Eyed Peas, PLK, Josman, Charlotte de Witte, Vald, Niska, Damso, ElGrandeToto, and Theodora.
