= Pukkelpop 2008 =

Music festival in Belgium

Pukkelpop 2008 was a music festival that took place on the plains beside the Kempische Steenweg in Kiewit, Belgium, located near the city of Hasselt, on the 14th, 15th, and 16th of August 2008.

Metallica, The Killers, and Sigur Rós headlined the event, which also saw appearances from acts such as The Flaming Lips, Hot Chip, Within Temptation, Erol Alkan, Manic Street Preachers, MGMT, and Crystal Castles. Belgian electro band Soulwax brought the festival to a close, performing on the Main Stage on the final night.

This year saw the introduction of a new indoor stage, The Shelter. It replaced the Skate Stage, the event's second outdoor stage and a festival mainstay for the past decade. The new setting still focused on punk and metal acts, with Soulfly, Meshuggah, and Killswitch Engage closing the stage on each of the three nights respectively.

The event was attended by 152,000 people, a record number for the festival at the time.

== Line-up ==
=== Thursday, August 14 ===
Main Stage	Marquee	Dance Hall	The Shelter
The Killers; Róisín Murphy; Editors; Dropkick Murphys; Serj Tankian; Danko Jones; Amy Macdonald; The Subways; Triggerfinger	The Flaming Lips; Mercury Rev; Ian Brown; Joan as Police Woman; Dirty Pretty Things; The Cribs; The Pigeon Detectives; Kaizers Orchestra; Die! Die! Die!	Stereo MCs; Pendulum; Hot Chip; Tricky; Infadels; Santogold; De Jeugd van Tegenwoordig; Midnight Juggernauts; The Shoes	Soulfly; Thrice; The Casualties; Animal Alpha; The Unseen; Have Heart; Hi-Fi Handgrenades; Disco Ensemble

Boiler Room	Club	Chateau	Wablief?
Mish Mash Soundsystem; Carl Craig; High Contrast; SebastiAn; Ed and Kim; Uffie and Feadz; DJ Mehdi; TC; Headman Shabalala; Compuphonic	The Ting Tings; Iron and Wine; Hadouken!; British Sea Power; One Night Only; Soko; Joe Lean and the Jing Jang Jong; Louis XIV; Red Light Company	Holy Fuck; Drive-By Truckers; Henry Rollins; White Lies; Menomena; Little Dragon; Kid Harpoon; A Mountain of One	The Subs; Le Le; Headphone; Freaky Age; AKA The Junkies; MaxNormal.TV; The Germans; Motek

=== Friday, August 15 ===
Main Stage	Marquee	Dance Hall	The Shelter
Metallica; Within Temptation; Stereophonics; Cold War Kids; Arsenal; Michael Franti and Spearhead; Das Pop; Sons of Albion	The Gutter Twins; Tindersticks; The Breeders; Tim Vanhamel; Foals; A Brand; Girls in Hawaii; Sons and Daughters; State Radio	Boys Noize; Miss Kittin and The Hacker; Robyn; Leila; Deadmau5; Modeselektor and Pfadfinderei; The Count & Sinden; Dusty Kid; AutoKratz	Meshuggah; MxPx; Mindless Self Indulgence; Volbeat; A Wilhelm Scream; Cult of Luna; Witchcraft; Year Long Disaster

Boiler Room	Club	Chateau	Wablief?
Ed & Kim; Ricardo Villalobos; DJ Hype and Daddy Earl; Erol Alkan; Surkin; Brodinski; Radioclit; Chase & Status; Murdock	The Rascals; Blood Red Shoes; The Futureheads; Does It Offend You, Yeah?; The Dø; Lightspeed Champion; Pete and the Pirates; Those Dancing Days	Tokyo Police Club; Alphabeat; Martina Topley-Bird; Tunng; Los Campesinos!; Caribou; Nina Nastasia; The Dodos	Lady Linn And Her Magnificent Seven; Kitty Daisy & Lewis; Creature with the Atom Brain

=== Saturday, August 16 ===
Main Stage	Marquee	Dance Hall	The Shelter
Soulwax; Sigur Rós; Bloc Party; Manic Street Preachers; Plain White T's; The Wombats; The Rones	Elbow; Jamie Lidell; The Dresden Dolls; MGMT; Anti-Flag; The National; Black Kids; The Black Box Revelation; Lykke Li	Etienne de Crecy; Simian Mobile Disco; Hercules and Love Affair; Junkie XL; Girl Talk; Yelle; Late of the Pier; The Whip; Samim and Miguel Toro	Killswitch Engage; Neurosis; Less Than Jake; As I Lay Dying; Epica; Amenra; This Is Menace; The Ocean

Boiler Room	Club	Chateau	Wablief?
Hermanos Inglesos; Dr. Lektroluv; 2 Many DJs; Erol Alkan; Tocadisco; A-Trak; DJ Friction; Crookers; The Bloody Beetroots; Goldfox	We Are Scientists; Alela Diane; Black Mountain; Yeasayer; Two Gallants; The Heavy; Look See Proof	Crystal Castles; M83; Chrome Hoof; Shackleton; Benga; Dan le Sac vs. Scroobius Pip; A Storm of Light; Fuck Buttons; Pivot	Monza; The Hickey Underworld; Lemon; Móveis Coloniais de Acaju; COEM; Roadburg
