= The Union (The Union album) =

Studio album by The Union
- Released: 23 August 2010
- Recorded: 2010 at Leeders Farm Studios, Wymondham, Norfolk; Walton Castle, Clevedon, North Somerset; and Tackle Out, London
- Genre: Hard rock; blues rock
- Length: 52:35
- Label: Payola Records
- Producer: Luke Morley and Peter Shoulder

The Union chronology
The Union (2010)	Siren's Song (2011)

Singles from The Union
- 1. "Step up to the Plate" Released: 2010; 2. "Black Monday" Released: 2010; 3. "Watch the River Flow" Released: 25 October 2010; 4. "This Time Next Year" Released: 13 December 2010

The Union is the eponymous debut album by The Union, the English rock band formed by Thunder guitarist Luke Morley and Peter Shoulder (formerly of Winterville). It was released on 23 August 2010 and features, on a bonus DVD, the band's first concert, at the Garage in London from December 2009.

== Reception ==
Professional ratings
Review scores
Source	Rating
BBC	(favourable)
Classic Rock	9/10 stars

BBC reviewed the album on 8 August, calling it "a collaboration which benefits from a perfect pairing of youth and experience" and noting that it "could well be the album of their collective careers".

Music News noted that the "critically acclaimed release" was "a very modern take on classic styles", featuring "impeccable songwriting" and "uniquely powerful and emotive vocals".

== Track listing ==
All tracks written by Luke Morley and Peter Shoulder, except where noted.

CD
No.	Title	Length
1.	"Watch the River Flow"	4:44
2.	"Easy Street"	4:22
3.	"Saviour"	4:02
4.	"Step up to the Plate"	3:52
5.	"Holy Roller"	3:54
6.	"You Know My Name"	5:11
7.	"Come Rain, Come Shine"	4:11
8.	"Black Monday"	4:14
9.	"Amazon"	4:28
10.	"This Time Next Year"	3:45
11.	"Lilies"	3:57
12.	"The Space Between Us"	5:55

Bonus DVD
No.	Title	Length
1.	"Easy Street"
2.	"You Know My Name"
3.	"Black Monday"
4.	"Come Rain, Come Shine"
5.	"Holy Roller"
6.	"This Time Next Year"
7.	"Saviour"
8.	"Watch the River Flow"
9.	"Lilies"
10.	"Proud Mary" (John Fogerty)

== Personnel ==
- Peter Shoulder – lead vocals, guitar, piano, Hammond organ, banjo, slamming door
- Luke Morley – vocals, guitar, harmonica, percussion, additional engineering
- Chris Childs – bass guitar
- Phil Martini – drums
- Chrisse G and Emily Ambros – additional backing vocals on "This Time Next Year"
- Patrick Arbuthnot – pedal steel guitar on "Saviour"
- Steve Penny and Angie Jenkison – handclaps on "Holy Roller"
