= Siren's Song (album) =

Studio album by The Union
- Released: October 3, 2011
- Recorded: 2011 at Rockfield Studios, Monmouth, Wales; Walton Castle, Clevedon, North Somerset; Tackle Out, London; Air Lyndhurst, London
- Genre: Rock, hard rock, blues rock
- Length: 47:01
- Label: Payola Records
- Producer: Luke Morley, Peter Shoulder

The Union chronology
The Union (2010)	Siren's Song (2011)	The World Is Yours (2013)

Professional ratings
Review scores
Source	Rating
rushonrock.com	9/10 stars

Siren's Song is the second studio album by The Union, the English rock band formed by ex-Thunder guitarist Luke Morley and Peter Shoulder (formerly of Winterville). It was released on 3 October 2011.

== Track listing ==
All tracks produced, written and arranged by Luke Morley and Peter Shoulder.

CD
No.	Title	Length
1.	"Siren's Song"	4:40
2.	"Blame It On Tupelo"	4:53
3.	"Orion"	3:20
4.	"Obsession"	4:41
5.	"Make Up Your Mind"	4:51
6.	"The Remedy"	3:45
7.	"Cut The Line"	4:50
8.	"Burning Daylight"	4:19
9.	"Black Gold"	4:06
10.	"Time"	4:17
11.	"If I Could Make You Mine"	3:19

Deluxe Edition Bonus Disc
No.	Title	Length
1.	"Save Your Goodbyes (Previously Unreleased)"	3:42
2.	"Dust To Dust (Previously Unreleased)"	3:46
3.	"Down In The Underworld (Previously Unreleased)"	4:15
4.	"If I Could Make You Mine (Acoustic Version)"	3:09
5.	"Make Up Your Mind (Acoustic Version)"	4:05
6.	"Siren's Song (Live In Holland 2011)"	4:46
7.	"Black Monday (Live In Holland 2011)"	4:46
8.	"Saviour (Live In Holland 2011)"	4:12

== Personnel ==
- Peter Shoulder - lead vocals, guitar, mandolin, piano, Hammond organ, pedal steel
- Luke Morley - guitar, vocals, percussion
- Chris Childs - bass guitar
- Dave McCluskey - drums
- Phil Martin - drums

=== Additional musicians ===
- Helena May Harrison - backing vocals
- Katy Burgess - backing vocals
- Alex Beamont - cello
