= Triggerfinger =

Triggerfinger may refer to:

- Trigger finger, a common disorder characterized by catching, snapping or locking of the involved finger flexor tendon, associated with dysfunction and pain
- Triggerfinger (band), a Belgian rock band
- Triggerfinger (album), an album by Belgian rock band Triggerfinger
- "Triggerfinger" (song), a song by Donkeyboy
- "Triggerfinger" (The Walking Dead), an episode of the television series The Walking Dead
- Trigger Fingers (1924 film), a silent American film
- Trigger Fingers (1939 film), an American film
- Trigger Fingers (1946 film), an American film
