= Come On Baby =

C'mon Baby or Come On Baby may refer to:

== Music ==
- Come on Baby EP, by Tokyo Dragons 2006

=== Songs ===
- "Come On Baby", song by Joe Satriani from Professor Satchafunkilus and the Musterion of Rock
- Come On Baby (Moby song)
- Come On Baby (Saigon song)
- "Come On Baby (Let's Do the Revolution)", song by Chumbawamba from Never Mind the Ballots
- "Come On Baby", single by Tokyo Dragons 2006 from Give Me the Fear
- "Come On Baby (Shift That Log)", song by Cat Stevens on his album New Masters 1967
- "Come On Baby", song by The Breakaways, F. O'Connor 1978
- "Come On Baby", song by Bruce Channel, Channel 1962
- "Come On Baby", song by The Eagles (UK band) 1963
- "Come On Baby", song by The Grumbleweeds, Maurice Lee 1981
- "Come On Baby", song by Jimmy Smith (musician), Burrell 1960
- "Come On Baby", song by Jo-Ann Campbell, Jo-Ann Campbell 1957
- "Come On Baby", song by Leon Bass, Leon Bass 1960
- "Come On Baby", song by Lightning Hopkins, Hopkins 1965
- "Come On Baby", song by Lord Creator, Kentrick Patrick 1963
- "Come On Baby", song by Ottilie Patterson With Chris Barber's Jazz Band, Ottilie Patterson 1962
- "Come On Baby", song by Owen Gray With Sonny Bradshaw Quartet, Gray 1962
- "Come On Baby", song by Pliers (singer) W. Riley
- "Come On Baby", song by Ramsey Lewis Trio, Holt & Lewis 1963
- "Come On Baby", song by The Rockin' Chairs, R. Bachstetter, L. Yellin 1958
- "Come On Baby", song by Roulettes, Galanti 1958
- "Come On Baby", single by Willie Mabon, Mabon 1955
- "Come On Baby", song by Mickey Gilley, M. Gilley 1973
- "C'mon Baby", song by Buddy Knox and The Rhythm Orchids 1958
- "C'mon Baby", song by Chilly (band) 1978
- "C'mon Baby", song by Tricky (musician) 2009
- Come On Baby Papa Winnie 1991
