= The World Is Yours (The Union album) =

Studio album by The Union
- Released: February 11, 2013
- Recorded: 2012 at Walton Castle, Clevedon, North Somerset; Tackle Out, London; Strongroom, London
- Genre: Rock, hard rock, blues rock
- Label: Payola Records
- Producer: Luke Morley, Peter Shoulder

The Union chronology
Siren's Song (2011)	The World Is Yours (2013)

The World Is Yours is the third studio album by The Union, the English rock band formed by ex-Thunder guitarist Luke Morley and Peter Shoulder (formerly of Winterville). It was released on 11 February 2013. The album was funded by a PledgeMusic campaign, which had already passed the 200 percent mark by November 2012.

The band embarked on a ten-date tour of the UK in February 2013 in support of The World Is Yours.

== Track listing ==
All tracks produced, written and arranged by Luke Morley and Peter Shoulder.

CD
No.	Title	Length
1.	"Sawtooth Mountain Ride, Part 1"	0:18
2.	"You're My Jesus"	4:10
3.	"Tonight I'm Alive"	4:03
4.	"Fading out of Love"	4:35
5.	"The World Is Yours"	5:09
6.	"To Say Goodbye"	4:15
7.	"The Perfect Crime"	3:35
8.	"Tangled up in You"	4:00
9.	"Lost to the Wind"	4:55
10.	"What Doesn't Kill You"	4:33
11.	"Marie [sic] Celeste"	3:34
12.	"Wreck My Scene"	2:15
13.	"This Is a London Song"	4:29
14.	"You Can Share My Dreams"	2:52
15.	"Sawtooth Mountain Ride, Part 2"	1:11

Deluxe Edition Bonus Disc
No.	Title	Length
1.	"Diamond Star"
2.	"Let the River Rise"
3.	"Living by the Gun"
4.	"Siren's Song" (acoustic at Walton Castle)
5.	"Saviour" (acoustic at Walton Castle)
6.	"Tonight I'm Alive" (acoustic version)
7.	"Fading out of Love" (acoustic version)
8.	"Sawtooth Mountain Ride" (full version)

== Personnel ==
- Peter Shoulder — lead vocals, guitar, mandolin, piano, Hammond organ, lap steel
- Luke Morley — guitar, vocals, percussion
- Chris Childs — bass guitar
- Dave McCluskey — drums

=== Guest musicians ===
- Helena May Harrison — backing vocals
- Katy Burgess — backing vocals

=== Production ===
- Peter Shoulder and Luke Morley — production
- Rupert Coulson — engineering and mixing
- Andrew Thompson — mastering
- Brian Smith — assistant engineer at Tackle Out
- Ben Matthews — assistant engineer at Walton Castle
- Artwork, design and photography courtesy of Hugh Gilmour, Marty Moffatt and Jason Joyce
