= Team William =

Belgian band

- Origin: Ghent/Ninove/Brugge, Belgium
- Genres: Indie pop
- Labels: Keremos - Bang!
- Members: Floris De Decker; Arne Sunaert; Douwe Van Maele; Nils Tijtgat (2013-)
- Past members: Bert Moerman (-2010); Thomas Mortier (-2012); Antoni Foscez

Team William is a Belgian indie pop band. Team William are best known for their energetic, somewhat chaotic mix between CYHSY and Wolf Parade. In 2009, they released their self-titled debut album on the Keremos label. Their second album was released in 2015, titled "Drama".

== History ==
Logo

In 2008, they arrived third in Belgium's influential HUMO's Rock Rally contest.

In March 2009 they were invited to play on the showcase festival Canadian Music Week. In the same month Everything was a Verb was used for a national television commercial for volunteering.

They have been appointed ambassadors for Poppunt's Excite project (Exchange of International Talent in Europe), giving them the opportunity to play in Scotland, where they shared the stage with The Flaming Lips (June '09), Denmark, Spain and The Netherlands.

Their debut album, Team William, was recorded early 2009 and was produced by Mario Goossens (drummer of Triggerfinger, ex-Winterville (band)) who also produced the debut album of The Black Box Revelation in 2008. On May 18, 2009 the Team had a release party for the album in the Vooruit (Ghent), and subsequently released it nationwide June 15 via Bang!.

The album has received overall positive reviews from Belgian mainstream media such as HUMO (****), Cutting Edge (*****), Focus Knack (***), Goddeau and Rif Raf.

On August 22, 2009 Team William played at Pukkelpop on the Wablief stage. The same day, they signed a contract with EMI Music Publishing.

After a hiatus and a change in line-up, Team William released their second album "Drama" in 2015.

== Discography ==
=== Team William (2009) ===
All tracks are written by Floris De Decker, Team William.

No.	Title	Length
1.	"London Lofi"	3:18
2.	"You Have My Heart, Okay" (Second single, video clip)	2:50
3.	"Lord of the Dogs" (First single, video clip)	3:27
4.	"First Snow"	4:02
5.	"Judo Kid"	1:57
6.	"Wonderyear III"	3:13
7.	"70%"	3:28
8.	"Hotel"	2:55
9.	"Last Man on the Moon"	2:56
10.	"Me + My Hobo"	3:20
11.	"You Look Familiar"	2:44
12.	"Peptalk"	4:58
Total length:		39:03

- Produced by Mario Goossens
- Mixed by Filip Goris
- Assistant engineering by Wouter Gordts
- Mastered by Fred Kevorkian at Avatar Studios
- Trumpets on 5 & 10 by Reinhard Deman

=== Drama (2015) ===
All tracks are written by Floris De Decker, Team William.

No.	Title	Length
1.	"Ocean Fire"
2.	"A New Country"
3.	"Stormy Weather"
4.	"Close Enough"
5.	"Feel U"
6.	"Faster Than Light"
7.	"1995" (First single)
8.	"Nothing Ever Seems To Last"
9.	"Away With The Fairies"
10.	"Poets"
11.	"Back 2 Sleep"
12.	"Into The Night"
13.	"Where It All Turns Black"
