= List of number-one albums of 2012 (Belgium) =

The Belgian Albums Chart, divided into the two main regions Flanders and Wallonia, ranks the best-performing albums in Belgium, as compiled by Ultratop.

== Flanders ==
Issue date	Album	Artist	Reference
7 January	21	Adele	
14 January	21	Adele	
21 January	21	Adele	
28 January	21	Adele	
4 February	Old Ideas	Leonard Cohen	
11 February	Old Ideas	Leonard Cohen	
18 February	Old Ideas	Leonard Cohen	
25 February	21	Adele	
3 March	21	Adele	
10 March	Wrecking Ball	Bruce Springsteen	
17 March	With Orchestra	Hooverphonic	
24 March	With Orchestra	Hooverphonic	
31 March	MDNA	Madonna	
7 April	MDNA	Madonna	
14 April	21	Adele	
21 April	Birdy	Birdy	
28 April	Blunderpuss	Jack White	
5 May	With Orchestra	Hooverphonic	
12 May	Little Broken Hearts	Norah Jones	
19 May	1	Julio Iglesias	
26 May	As It Ever Was	Absynthe Minded	
2 June	Faders Up2 Live In Amsterdam	Triggerfinger	
9 June	Following Sea	Deus	
16 June	Following Sea	Deus	
23 June	Following Sea	Deus	
30 June	Following Sea	Deus	
7 July	2	Netsky	
14 July	2	Netsky	
21 July	2	Netsky	
28 July	Back To Back	De Strangers & Katastroof	
4 August	Back To Back	De Strangers & Katastroof	
11 August	2	Netsky	
18 August	Vrienden	Jan Smit	
25 August	Het beste en meer - 5 zomers lang	Lindsay	
1 September	2	Netsky	
8 September	2	Netsky	
15 September	Coexist	The xx	
22 September	Coexist	The xx	
29 September	Coexist	The xx	
6 October	The 2nd Law	Muse	
13 October	The 2nd Law	Muse	
20 October	Babel	Mumford & Sons	
27 October	Balthazar	Rats	
3 November	With Orchestra	Hooverphonic	
10 November	With Orchestra	Hooverphonic	
17 November	Take Me Home	One Direction	
24 November	The Broken Circle Breakdown	Soundtrack	
1 December	The Broken Circle Breakdown	Soundtrack	
8 December	The Broken Circle Breakdown	Soundtrack	
15 December	The Broken Circle Breakdown	Soundtrack	
22 December	The Broken Circle Breakdown	Soundtrack	
29 December	The Broken Circle Breakdown	Soundtrack	

== Wallonia ==
Issue date	Album	Artist	Reference
7 January	21	Adele	
14 January	21	Adele	
21 January	21	Adele	
28 January	21	Adele	
4 February	Old Ideas	Leonard Cohen	
11 February	Born to Die	Lana Del Rey	
18 February	Old Ideas	Leonard Cohen	
25 February	Paradize+10	Indochine	
3 March	21	Adele	
10 March	21	Adele	
17 March	L'Apogée	Sexion d'Assaut	
24 March	2012: Le bal des Enfoirés	Les Enfoirés	
31 March	2012: Le bal des Enfoirés	Les Enfoirés	
7 April	2012: Le bal des Enfoirés	Les Enfoirés	
14 April	2012: Le bal des Enfoirés	Les Enfoirés	
21 April	2012: Le bal des Enfoirés	Les Enfoirés	
28 April	Le Best Of 2012	Pierre Rapsat	
5 May	Le Best Of 2012	Pierre Rapsat	
12 May	Le Best Of 2012	Pierre Rapsat	
19 May	Le Best Of 2012	Pierre Rapsat	
26 May	L'Apogée	Sexion d'Assaut	
2 June	L'Apogée	Sexion d'Assaut	
9 June	Hommage	Yannick Noah	
16 June	Hommage	Yannick Noah	
23 June	L'Apogée	Sexion d'Assaut	
30 June	L'Apogée	Sexion d'Assaut	
7 July	L'Apogée	Sexion d'Assaut	
14 July	L'Apogée	Sexion d'Assaut	
21 July	L'Apogée	Sexion d'Assaut	
28 July	L'Apogée	Sexion d'Assaut	
4 August	L'Apogée	Sexion d'Assaut	
11 August	L'Apogée	Sexion d'Assaut	
18 August	L'Apogée	Sexion d'Assaut	
25 August	L'Apogée	Sexion d'Assaut	
1 September	L'Apogée	Sexion d'Assaut	
8 September	Ladilafé	Tryo	
15 September	L'Apogée	Sexion d'Assaut	
22 September	Je descends du singe	Marc Lavoine	
29 September	L'amour & moi	Jenifer	
6 October	The 2nd Law	Muse	
13 October	The 2nd Law	Muse	
20 October	The 2nd Law	Muse	
27 October	The 2nd Law	Muse	
3 November	Vise le ciel ou Bob Dylan revisité	Francis Cabrel	
10 November	Vise le ciel ou Bob Dylan revisité	Francis Cabrel	
17 November	Sans attendre	Celine Dion	
24 November	L'attente	Johnny Hallyday	
1 December	Sans attendre	Celine Dion	
8 December	Lequel de nous	Patrick Bruel	
15 December	Monkey Me	Mylène Farmer	
22 December	Monkey Me	Mylène Farmer	
29 December	Sans attendre	Celine Dion	
