= Faders Up 2 =

Live album by Triggerfinger
- Released: 18 May 2012
- Recorded: November 2011; Amsterdam, Netherlands
- Genre: Stoner rock, hard rock, blues rock
- Length: 89:34
- Label: Excelsior Recordings

Triggerfinger chronology
All This Dancin' Around (2010)	Faders Up 2 (2012)	By Absence of the Sun (2014)

Faders Up 2 is a live album of the Belgian band Triggerfinger. The album was released on 18 May 2012, having been recorded during a concert in Amsterdam, Netherlands in November 2011.

== Track list ==
No.	Title	Length
1.	"Intro"	1:46
2.	"I'm Coming For You"	3:27
3.	"On my Knees"	5:37
4.	"Short Term Memory Love"	5:03
5.	"Cherry"	3:26
6.	"My Baby's Got A Gun"	7:36
7.	"All This Dancin' Around"	5:49
8.	"Drum solo"	4:38
9.	"First Taste"	3:56
10.	"Is It"	5:55
11.	"Feed Me"	5:38
12.	"Let It Ride"	3:31
13.	"It Hasn't Gone Away"	5:59
14.	"I Follow Rivers" (Lykke Li cover)	3:34
15.	"It Hasn't Gone Away"	6:32
16.	"Love Lost in Love"	3:41
17.	"Cherry (Christmas Version)"	3:04
18.	"All Night Long"	4:17
19.	"Ballad of a Thin Man" (Bob Dylan cover)	6:07
Total length:		89:34

== Personnel ==
- Ruben Block - lead vocals, guitar
- Paul Van Bruystegem - bass guitar, backing vocals
- Mario Goossens - drums, backing vocals

== Chart performance ==
Chart (2012)	Peak position
Belgian Albums (Ultratop Flanders)	1
Belgian Albums (Ultratop Wallonia)	69
Dutch Albums (Album Top 100)	3

== Certifications ==
In 2012, Faders Up 2 - Live in Amsterdam was certified gold in Belgium.
