= The Union (band) =

British rock band

- Origin: United Kingdom
- Genres: Hard rock; blues rock
- Years active: 2009–present
- Labels: Payola Records
- Members: Luke Morley; Peter Shoulder; Chris Childs; Dave McCluskey
- Past members: Geoff Holroyde; Phil Martini
- Website: Official website

The Union are a British rock band formed in 2009 by Luke Morley, guitarist for Thunder, and Peter Shoulder, formerly of Winterville.

== History ==
=== Formation and The Union ===
After the breakup of Thunder in August 2009, guitarist Luke Morley announced that he had formed a new group with Pete Shoulder, whose previous band, Winterville, had split in 2007. The band was to be called The Union. The pair had met each other eight years previously and had "worked together ever since whenever our previous commitments allowed us time". Chris Childs (also previously in Thunder) and Phil Martini (from Down 'n' Outz) were later named as the bassist and drummer respectively for the band, although not as 'full' members of the group, as they intend to have a more "fluid line-up".

The Union made their live debut on 15 December 2009, at The Relentless Garage in London. The show was filmed for a live DVD, which was released with their debut album. It was announced in February 2010 that the band were to play at that year's inaugural High Voltage Festival; they played the Main Stage on Saturday 24 July. This followed their first full tour of the UK, which took place over ten dates in April. The Union also played the 2010 Sonisphere Festival at Knebworth on Sunday 1 June.

The band's debut single, "Step up to the Plate", was premiered on Planet Rock on Thursday 18 March, and was available to download from the band's website. The Union announced two shows in late July (between their appearances at High Voltage and Sonisphere) which they were to headline and another UK tour in late September and early October. The band's second single, "Black Monday", was available as a free download in mid-May.

The Union's eponymous debut album was originally scheduled to be released on 16 August 2010; however, it was released a week later, on 23 August 2010. "Watch the River Flow", the band's third single, was released on 25 October. It was followed on 13 December by "This Time Next Year", which was the first official 'ChildLine Rocks' single.

At the Classic Rock Roll of Honour Awards on 10 November 2010, The Union were named the best new band of the year.

The Union supported Thin Lizzy on tour in January 2011, supported Triggerfinger on a tour of Belgium and The Netherlands in March 2011 and opened for Whitesnake when they toured the UK in June.

=== Siren's Song ===
The Union's second album, Siren's Song, was released in October 2011. The title track, "Siren's Song", was released in May 2011. The Union played the "Langford Live" festival in September 2011, in order to raise money for Teenage Cancer Trust. The festival, situated in Lower Langford, North Somerset, was headlined by Ocean Colour Scene. The Union embarked on a co-headlining tour of the UK with The Answer in March 2012, and also played alongside them at the Steelhouse Festival in July of the same year, which took place in the vicinity of Ebbw Vale. The Union also made an appearance at the 2012 edition of the Download Festival. Siren's Song was nominated in the 'Album of the Year' category at the 2012 Classic Rock Magazine Awards, although it eventually lost out to Rush's Clockwork Angels.

=== The World Is Yours ===
The Union's third studio album, The World Is Yours, was released on 11 February 2013. The band embarked on a UK tour throughout February in support of the new album. The album was funded by a PledgeMusic campaign, which had already passed the 200 per cent mark by November 2012.

== Band members ==
Current

- Peter Shoulder – lead vocals. guitars, keyboards (2009–present)
- Luke Morley – guitars, backing vocals (2009–present)
- Chris Childs – bass guitar (2009–present)
- Dave McCluskey – drums (September 2010–present)

Former

- Geoff Holroyde – drums (April 2010-August 2010)
- Phil Martini – drums (2009–2010)

== Discography ==
=== Studio albums ===
Year	Album details	Peak chart positions
Year	Album details	UK
2010	The Union: Release date: 23 August 2010; Label: Payola Records	77
2011	Siren's Song: Release date: 3 October 2011; Label: Payola Records	93
2013	The World Is Yours: Release date: 11 February 2013; Label: Payola Records	100
"—" denotes releases that did not chart or were not released in that territory.

=== Singles ===
Year	Single	Release date	Album
2010	"Step up to the Plate"	2010	The Union
2010	"Black Monday"	2010	The Union
2010	"Watch the River Flow"	25 October 2010	The Union
2010	"This Time Next Year"	13 December 2010	The Union
2011	"Siren's Song"	May 2011	Siren's Song
2012	"Make Up Your Mind"/"Obsession"	12 March 2012	Siren's Song
