= What Grabs Ya? =

Studio album by Triggerfinger
- Released: 25 February 2008
- Recorded: Redtape Studio, Studio Dam and The Fuzzbox; September 2007
- Genre: Hard rock, blues rock
- Length: 44:55
- Label: Excelsior Recordings
- Producer: Triggerfinger

Triggerfinger chronology
Faders Up (2007)	What Grabs Ya? (2008)	All This Dancin' Around (2010)

Singles from What Grabs Ya?
- 1. "Soon" Released: 2008; 2. "Is It" Released: 25 May 2009

What Grabs Ya? is the second studio album by Belgian rock band Triggerfinger, released on 25 February 2008 through Excelsior Recordings. Following 2004's Triggerfinger, the album managed to increase the band's popularity, but not enough for the band to break through in Belgium and the Netherlands.

On 11 July 2009, the album was re-issued, with additional songs.

== Track listing ==
All tracks are written by Ruben Block, except where noted.

No.	Title	Length
1.	"Short Term Memory Love"	4:19
2.	"First Taste"	3:23
3.	"Soon"	4:06
4.	"Halfway Town"	4:40
5.	"Scream" (Block/Walter Broes)	5:37
6.	"Is It"	3:11
7.	"All My Floating" (Block/Paul De Borger/Jan Blieck/Gino Campenaerts)	3:35
8.	"What Grabs Ya?"	3:26
9.	"Lines"	7:44
10.	"No Teasin' Around" (Billy "The Kid" Emerson)	4:53

Bonus tracks released on re-issue.

No.	Title	Length
11.	"Soon (unplugged)"	4:42
12.	"Father Of Night"	5:26
13.	"Scream (Live)" (Block/Broes)	5:51
14.	"First Taste (remix)"	5:16

== Personnel ==
- Ruben Block – lead vocals, guitar
- Paul Van Bruystegem – bass guitar
- Mario Goossens – drums
