= Everything in Moderation =

Everything In Moderation

Studio album by Winterville
- Released: 14 November 2005
- Recorded: Chapel Studios & Fallout Shelter
- Genre: Rock, blues
- Length: 51:36
- Label: Toxxic Records
- Producer: Winterville, Ali Staton, Steve Musters

Professional ratings
Review scores
Source	Rating
Classic Rock	4/5 stars
RoomThirteen.com	4/5 stars

Everything in Moderation was the only album by British-based rock trio Winterville, which was released on 14 November 2005 through Toxxic Records. It was released on CD and as a download via iTunes.

The album showcases the band's blend of 1960s blues-rock, 1990s grunge, and modern day rock. It included the band's first acoustic-only song, namely "Mr 3 Percent", which could be seen as the precursor to their later, all-acoustic EP, The Absinthe Sessions. Three singles were released from the album. These were "Shotgun Smile", "Under My Skin" and "Breathe".

The album was listed at number 23 in Classic Rock Magazine's 50 Best Albums of 2005, which was a poll of critics.

== Track listing ==
#	Title	Time
1.	"Breathe"	4:21
2.	"My Angels"	4:33
3.	"Last Legs"	4:02
4.	"Mock Halo"	4:13
5.	"Mr 3 Percent"	4:44
6.	"Nobody"	3:50
7.	"Shotgun Smile"	4:11
8.	"Idle Hands"	5:17
9.	"Under My Skin"	3:40
10.	"Nothing"	4:19
11.	"Penny For The Fool"	3:36
12.	"Someday Soon"	4:50

All songs written by Peter Shoulder, except "Under My Skin", written by Peter Shoulder & Steve McEwan.

Luke Morley of the band Thunder is credited for "Additional production and special guidance", probably because of the friendship the two bands had after their tour together.

The version of "Breathe" included here, and later released as a single, is a completely different recording to that which appeared on the band's earlier limited release The Fallout Sessions EP.

== Record label and the industry ==
Like the singles, the album was released on the band's own imprint, Toxxic Records. This is typical of guitarist Peter Shoulder's attitude to the music industry, who has "absolutely no interest in playing the whole pop game". Shoulder also attacks the industry in the songs "Mr 3 Percent" and "Penny For The Fool".
