= Sleepers' Reign =

Belgian indie pop band

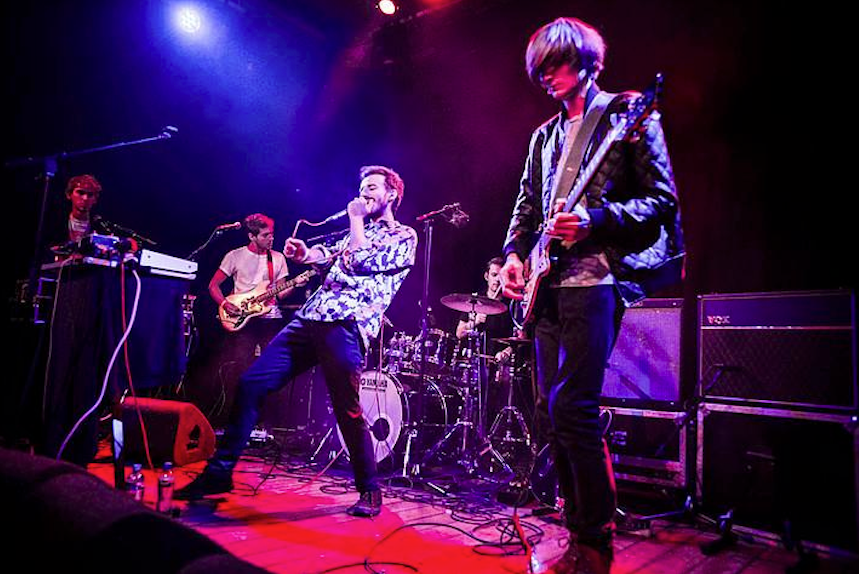
- Sleepers' Reign live at Paradiso, Amsterdam

Background information
- Origin: Herentals, Belgium
- Genres: Indie pop
- Years active: 2010–present
- Labels: Sialia Records
- Members: Lukas Hermans; Orson Wouters; Ruben Mertens; Quasier De Clercq; Sander Stuer
- Past members: Tom Spruyt; Jasper Verdonck
- Website: www.sleepersreign.com

Sleepers' Reign is a Belgian indie pop band from Herentals, Antwerp.

== History ==
Sleepers' Reign was founded in 2010 by childhood friends Lukas Hermans, Ruben Mertens, Orson Wouters and Jasper Verdonck. They started out producing their first demo's in their bedroom studio. In 2012 they played their first live shows competing in Humo's Rock Rally, a biennial music contest, in which they finished second and won the audience prize. The following year, the band released their first single Four Dots, together with a cover of Bob Dylan's Like a Rolling Stone, whereupon they opened for Daniel Johnston and played Oppikoppi festival in Limpopo, South Africa.

From 2014 to 2016, the band supported John Parish and How to Dress Well in Belgium and played at CMJ Music Marathon in New York City.

On 4 March 2016 Sleepers' Reign released their debut album King Into Delight (recorded and mixed by Justin Gerrish), along with an interactive mobile app that allows fans to listen to the album, read the lyrics and customize the album artwork. After their release concert in the Ancienne Belgique, the band showcased their album at SXSW, Austin, Texas, opened for Manic Street Preachers in Belgium and The Netherlands, and played Pukkelpop festival.

== Discography ==
- Four Dots / Like A Rolling Stone (2013)
- King Into Delight (2016)
