= Breathe (Winterville song) =

Single by Winterville

from the album Everything in Moderation
- Released: March 20, 2006
- Genre: Blues-rock
- Length: 4:23
- Label: Toxxic Records
- Songwriter: Peter Shoulder
- Producers: Ali Staton, Winterville, Steve Musters

Winterville singles chronology
"Under My Skin" (2005)	"Breathe" (2006)

"Breathe" was the third single from British-based Blues-rock trio Winterville. It was released on March 20, 2006 through the band's own imprint, Toxxic Records. The single was available on 7" Vinyl and as a download from the iTunes Store. It was the band's last release before their split in early 2007.

== Track list ==
#	Title	Time
1.	"Breathe"	4:23
2.	"Hole Thru my Head"	4:05

All songs by Peter Shoulder.

The track listings for the 7" and the iTunes download are identical.

"Breathe" had previously appeared on the band's only album Everything in Moderation. "Hole Thru my Head" was a new track, and has not appeared on any subsequent Winterville release. A different version of "Breathe" appeared on the earlier Winterville release, "The Fallout Sessions EP". This version didn't have the 'wall of guitars' sound that characterises the single version, and was instead a quieter, more reserved song.

== Songs ==
"Breathe" is known as one of the earliest Winterville songs. Shoulder says “It was the first song that I wrote with Winterville in mind. It's about feeling inferior to someone who feels quite inadequate themselves. A person who doesn’t realise what they’ve got, but everyone around them can see it.” It is a brooding song, with heavy, multi-tracked guitars.

"Hole Thru my Head" is a more delicate affair. It is quiet and gentle, though not acoustic like other quieter Winterville songs. Little has been publicly stated about the song, since it has never appeared on any other release, and it was not included on Winterville's song summaries page since it didn't appear on the album.
