= Humo's Rock Rally =

Belgian contest for rock bands

- Compilation album released in 2008
- Awarded for: Most promising Belgian rock artists
- Country: Belgium
- Presented by: Humo
- First award: April 8, 1978; 48 years ago

Humo's Rock Rally is a Belgian contest for rock bands, organized every second year since 1978. It is organized by the Belgian magazine HUMO.

Every band that has not yet released an official recording, may enter the Rock Rally, by submitting a demo to HUMO. HUMO then selects 100 bands to compete in the pre-selections, followed by semi-finals and a final with 10 bands. The competing bands are assessed by a professional jury. Money prizes are awarded to the top three bands, as well as to one band chosen by the audience.

The Rock Rally is an important possibility for young Belgian rock bands to get in the picture. Many notable Belgian bands and musicians, such as dEUS, The Black Box Revelation, Evil Superstars, Novastar, Milow, Arid, An Pierlé, Das Pop, Admiral Freebee and Goose, launched their career in the Rock Rally.

== Past prize winners and notable finalists ==
=== 2024 ===
1. Maria Iskariot
2. Teun
3. Tje

=== 2022 ===
1. Bluai
2. Meltheads
3. Yacid

=== 2020 ===
1. Meskerem Mees
2. Wolker
3. Dyce

Other finalists: Yokan (Audience choice), All-Turn, Hugs of the Sky, Jakomo, Uma Chine, Be Irving, Terms

=== 2018 ===
1. The Calicos
2. Lagüna
3. EMY

Other finalists: Danny Blue and the Old Socks, Ugly Weirdo

=== 2016 ===
1. Whispering Sons
2. Rewind Productions
3. dirk.

Other finalists: Delta Crash, Equal Idiots

=== 2014 ===
1. Warhola
2. Nordmann
3. Five Days

Other finalists: Byron Bay

=== 2012 ===
1. Compact Disk Dummies
2. Sleepers' Reign (Audience choice)
3. Float Fall

Other finalists : Tourist LeMC

=== 2010 ===
1. School is Cool
2. The Sore Losers
3. Willow (Audience choice)

Other finalists: Amatorski, Maya's Moving Castle, The Crackups, Psycho 44, The Mojo Filters, Gloria, Nele Van Den Broeck

=== 2008 ===
1. Steak Number Eight
2. Jasper Erkens (audience choice)
3. Team William

Other finalists: Berriegordies, Roadburg, the Galacticos, Hong Kong Dong, the Porn Bloopers, the Tabasco Collective, Way

=== 2006 ===
1. The Hickey Underworld
2. The Black Box Revelation
3. Rye Jehu
- Balthazar (audience choice)

Other finalist: Freaky Age

=== 2004 ===
1. The Van Jets
2. Absynthe Minded
3. Madensuyu (audience choice)
- Milow

=== 2002 ===
1. Goose
2. Illyrian (audience choice)
3. Very Camel

=== 2000 ===
1. Mintzkov Luna
2. Admiral Freebee (audience choice)
3. Venus In Flames
- Mint
- Zornik Breknov (now Zornik)

=== 1998 ===
1. Das Pop
2. Fence
3. Chrome Yellow

=== 1996 ===
1. Novastar
2. Tom Helsen
3. Sheffield Wednesday
- Arid
- An Pierlé

=== 1994 ===
1. Evil Superstars
2. Sticks & Stones
3. Sweater

=== 1992 ===
1. Charlie 45
2. The Beautiful Babies
3. Orgasmaddix
- dEUS

=== 1990 ===
1. Noordkaap
2. Kitchen of Insanity
3. Gorky

=== 1988 ===
1. Ze Noiz
2. The Romans
3. The B-Tunes
- Citizen Kane (with Daan Stuyven)

=== 1986 ===
1. The Peter Pan Band
2. Passion of a Primitif
3. The Wolfbanes / The Boy Wonders (shared third place)

=== 1984 ===
1. Elisa Waut
2. Morceaux Durs
3. Beau Geste

Other finalists: Yasja, Gabriella & the Professionals, Chow-chow, Rue Da Mort, Mensen Blaffen, Primitifs, The Beauty Trap

=== 1982 ===
1. The Chrome
2. 2 Belgen
3. 5 CV
- Gruppenbild (with Stijn Meuris)

=== 1980 ===
1. The Machines
2. The Singles
3. The Sweeties

=== 1978 ===
1. Once More
2. Stagebeast
3. Clown
- De Kreuners
- Speedy King and his Feetwarmers met Guido Belcanto
