= Hot Nuts =

Studio album by Tokyo Dragons
- Released: 24 September 2007
- Genre: Hard rock
- Length: 43:04
- Label: Escapi

Tokyo Dragons chronology
Give Me the Fear (2007)	Hot Nuts (2007)

Professional ratings
Review scores
Source	Rating
Metal Temple Magazine	8/10

Hot Nuts is the second studio album released by British hard rock band Tokyo Dragons.

== Track listing ==
1. "On Your Marks" - 4:21
2. "Keeping the Wolf from the Door" - 3:44
3. "If I Run, You Run" - 4:18
4. "Killing Everybody You Meet" - 4:38
5. "Rock My Boat" - 5:18
6. "On Fuel" - 2:14
7. "Slayed Alive" - 6:10
8. "Ramblin' Jack" - 3:51
9. "Couldn't I Just Tell You" - 3:35
10. "The Ballad of Ballard" - 4:51

== Personnel ==
- Steve Lomax - rhythm/lead guitars, lead vocals
- Mal Bruk - lead/rhythm guitars, backing vocals
- Mathias Stady - bass
- Phil Martini - drums, backing vocals
