= Faders Up =

Live album by Triggerfinger
- Released: 12 March 2007
- Recorded: September 2006; Antwerp, Belgium
- Genre: Stoner rock, hard rock, blues rock
- Length: 57:37
- Label: Excelsior Recordings

Triggerfinger chronology
Triggerfinger (2004)	Faders Up (2007)	What Grabs Ya? (2008)

Faders Up (Live) is a live album of the Belgian band Triggerfinger. The album was released on 12 March 2007, having been recorded during a concert in Antwerp, Belgium in September 2006.

== Track list ==
on
No.	Title	Length
1.	"On My Knees"	4:29
2.	"Faders Up"	6:53
3.	"Lil' Teaser"	4:53
4.	"Drivin'"	3:11
5.	"Father of Night" (Bob Dylan cover)	5:45
6.	"Camaro"	5:19
7.	"Hunt You Down"	3:30
8.	"Commotion" (Creedence Clearwater Revival cover)	11:44
9.	"Nothing Achieving" (The Police cover)	2:31
10.	"Boris the Spider" (The Who cover)	4:32
11.	"Angelene" (PJ Harvey cover)	4:50
Total length:		57:37

== Personnel ==
- Ruben Block - lead vocals, guitar
- Paul Van Bruystegem - bass guitar, backing vocals
- Mario Goossens - drums, backing vocals
