= By Absence of the Sun =

Album by Belgian rock band Triggerfinger

Studio album by Triggerfinger
- Released: 18 April 2014
- Recorded: Sunset Sound Studio's, LA; November 2013
- Genre: Hard rock, blues rock
- Length: 49:11
- Label: Excelsior Recordings
- Producer: Triggerfinger, Greg Gordon

Triggerfinger chronology
All This Dancin' Around (2010)	By Absence of the Sun (2014)	Colossus (2017)

Singles from By Absence of the Sun
- 1. "Perfect Match" Released: 26 February 2014

By Absence of the Sun is the fourth studio album by Belgian rock band Triggerfinger, released on 18 April 2014. The album was recorded at the Sunset Sound Studios in Los Angeles and mixed at the RedStar Studios in Los Angeles.

== Track listing ==
No.	Title	Writer(s)	Length
1.	"Game"	Ruben Block	5:02
2.	"Perfect Match"	Ruben Block	3:11
3.	"By Absence of the Sun"	Ruben Block	3:59
4.	"Big Hole"	Ruben Block	4:17
5.	"Off The Rack"	Ruben Block	3:32
6.	"Black Panic"	Ruben Block	5:50
7.	"There Isn't Time"	Ruben Block	3:06
8.	"And There She Was Lying in Wait"	Ruben Block	4:30
9.	"Splendor In The Grass"	Ruben Block	4:04
10.	"Halfway There"	Ruben Block, Mario Goossens	3:52
11.	"Trail of Love"	Ruben Block	4:33
12.	"Master of All Fears"	Ruben Block	3:20

== Personnel ==
- Ruben Block - lead vocals, guitar.
- Paul Van Bruystegem - bass guitar, backing vocals.
- Mario Goossens - drums, backing vocals.

== Charts ==
=== Weekly charts ===
Chart (2014)	Peak position
Belgian Albums (Ultratop Flanders)	1
Belgian Albums (Ultratop Wallonia)	21
Dutch Albums (Album Top 100)	1

=== Year-end charts ===
Chart (2014)	Position
Belgian Albums (Ultratop Flanders)	5
Belgian Albums (Ultratop Wallonia)	174
Dutch Albums (Album Top 100)	84

Chart (2015)	Position
Belgian Albums (Ultratop Flanders)	143

== Certifications ==
Region	Certification	Certified units/sales
Belgium (BEA)	Gold	15,000^{*}
^{*} Sales figures based on certification alone.
