= Freaky Age =

Belgian rock band

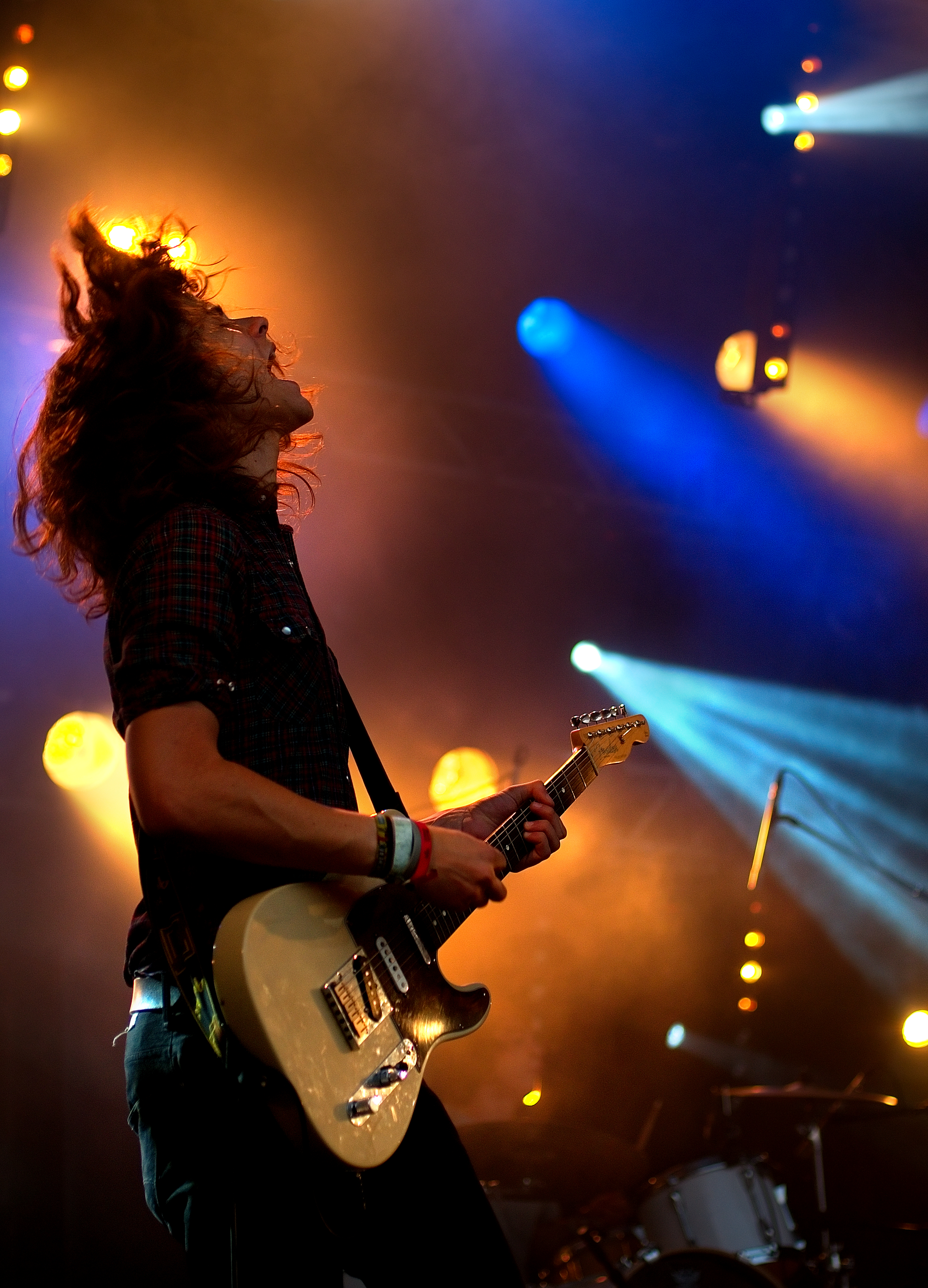
- Freaky Age

Background information
- Origin: Brussels, Belgium
- Genres: Alternative, rock
- Years active: 2006-2019
- Labels: V2 / PIAS
- Members: Lenny Crabbe; Mathias Declercq; Wouter Van den Bossche; Jonas Pauwels
- Website: Official site

Freaky Age was a Belgian rock band from Ternat, a suburb of Brussels, active from 2006 to 2019.

== Biography ==
Freaky Age were a melodic indie-rock band from Ternat, Belgium. Singer Lenny Crabbe, guitarist Mathias Declercq and drummer Jonas Pauwels got into the finals of the prestigious Belgian music contest Humo's Rock Rally in 2006. The trio was later joined by bass player Dete Heindrickx and in early 2008 the band were quickly snapped up by V2 Records (Benelux). In April 2008, they released their self-produced debut album ‘Every Morning Breaks Out’ with debut single ‘Time Is Over’ hitting the radio charts at number 5, followed by ‘Where Do We Go Now’ with four weeks at number 1 and 23 weeks in the charts in total. Two more singles followed: 'Every Morning Breaks Out' and 'John What's The Use'.

Following the success of their album, the band spent the next two years touring Belgium, France and the Netherlands as well as playing prominent festivals, including one of Belgium’s biggest, Pukkelpop; and Marktrock. They also received nominations for Best Alternative Band, Best Breakthrough and Best Song for Belgium’s Music Industry Awards (MIA's) and MTV/TMF Awards (Belgium). In spring 2009, Dete announced that he would be leaving the band and got replaced by Wouter Van den Bossche.

In 2010, the band were invited to play at SXSW. Later that year, in March, they released their second album 'Living In Particular Ways' at V2 Records. The album was recorded in Dada Studios Brussels with Peter Soldan and produced by the band with mastering by Frank Arkwright (The Coral, Arcade Fire, The Smiths) at London's Metropolis Studios. Three singles were released and made the Belgian charts: 'Excitement in the Morning Light', 'Never See the Sun' and 'Answering Machine'. Tours in the United Kingdom and The Netherlands followed the release of the album.

After having toured almost uninterruptedly for four years, the band is working on their third album with producer and Das Pop-guitarist Reinhard Vanbergen. The album will be released during Pukkelpop 2012.

In 2017, the band released their fourth album Inner Stranger.

On January 22, 2019, the band announces their split on Facebook. Their final show was on September 20, 2019, in Ancienne Belgique in Brussels.

== Discography ==
=== Singles ===
- Nothing ever changes (2019)
- All for nothing (2017)
- Drink about it (2017)
- Waste no tears (2017)
- Like a machine (2016)
- Heart Is Gold (2013)
- Masks (2012)
- Answering Machine (2010)
- Never See the Sun (2010)
- Excitement in the Morning Light (2010)
- John What's the Use (2009)
- Every Morning Breaks Out (2008)
- Where Do We Go Now (2008)
- Time Is Over (2007)

=== Albums ===
- Inner Stranger (2017)

1. All for Nothing
2. Like a Machine
3. Drink About It
4. Waste No Tears
5. Everything Is Better Now
6. My Own God
7. Someone Else
8. Lobotomy
9. Higher Ground
10. Issues
11. Tomorrow’s Monday
12. Hell of a Ride

- (From The Heart Of) Glitter Lake (2012)

1. Take It Slow
2. Big Joke
3. You Are My Everything
4. Heart Is Gold
5. Some People Say
6. White Russians
7. What If I?
8. Glitter Lake Man
9. Truth Is She Smiles
10. So Much Like You
11. Masks
12. Friendly Fire
13. As Long as You Want

- Living in Particular Ways (2010)

1. Excitement in the Morning Light
2. The Dreamer
3. Never See the Sun
4. Fire and the Lights
5. Hard to Believe
6. A Little Late
7. The Racing Horse
8. It Ain't Right
9. After All
10. Towns Don't Sleep
11. Rich Believers
12. Answering Machine
13. Play

- Every Morning Breaks Out (2008)

1. Every Morning Breaks Out
2. Play the Games
3. John What's the Use
4. They Never Lie
5. Time Is Over
6. Me and You
7. Where Do We Go Now
8. Weekend
9. Little Mistakes
10. Long Way
11. Weight of the World

- EP Freaky Age (2007)

1. Time Is Over
2. The Troublemaker
3. Mr. Nobody
4. Make It Better
