= All This Dancin' Around =

Studio album by Triggerfinger
- Released: 12 November 2010
- Recorded: Sound City Studios, Van Nuys and RedStar Recorders, Silverlake, California; May 2010
- Genre: Hard rock, blues rock
- Length: 50:50
- Label: Excelsior Recordings
- Producer: Triggerfinger, Greg Gordon (Uncle Sam)

Triggerfinger chronology
What Grabs Ya? (2008)	All This Dancin' Around (2010)	By Absence of the Sun (2014)

Singles from All This Dancin' Around
- 1. "All This Dancin' Around" Released: 11 October 2010; 2. "Love Lost In Love" Released: 10 January 2011; 3. "Let It Ride" Released: 9 May 2011; 4. "It Hasn't Gone Away" Released: 22 August 2011; 5. "I'm Coming For You" Released: 9 January 2012

All This Dancin' Around is the third studio album by Belgian rock band Triggerfinger, released on 12 November 2010. The album was recorded at the Sound City Studios in Van Nuys, California and RedStar Recording in Silverlake, California. The album was certified 'gold' on the Flemish Ultratop 50.

== Track listing ==
No.	Title	Length
1.	"All This Dancin' Around"	3:51
2.	"Let It Ride"	3:24
3.	"Love Lost in Love"	4:08
4.	"I'm Coming for You"	3:39
5.	"All Night Long"	4:26
6.	"Feed Me"	5:20
7.	"Cherry"	3:17
8.	"My Baby's Got a Gun"	8:03
9.	"Without a Sound"	4:32
10.	"Tuxedo"	3:38
11.	"It Hasn't Gone Away"	6:23

== Personnel ==
- Ruben Block – lead vocals, guitar.
- Paul Van Bruystegem – bass guitar, backing vocals.
- Mario Goossens – drums, backing vocals.

== Charts ==
=== Weekly charts ===
Chart (2010–12)	Peak position
Austrian Albums (Ö3 Austria)	13
Belgian Albums (Ultratop Flanders)	2
Belgian Albums (Ultratop Wallonia)	52
Dutch Albums (Album Top 100)	15
German Albums (Offizielle Top 100)	28
Swiss Albums (Schweizer Hitparade)	53

=== Year-end charts ===
Chart (2010)	Position
Belgian Albums (Ultratop Flanders)	49
Chart (2011)	Position
Belgian Albums (Ultratop Flanders)	6
Chart (2012)	Position
Belgian Albums (Ultratop Flanders)	89
