= Give Me the Fear =

Studio album by Tokyo Dragons
- Released: 26 September 2005
- Genre: Hard rock
- Length: 40:26
- Label: Escapi

Tokyo Dragons chronology
Give Me the Fear (2005)	Hot Nuts (2007)

Professional ratings
Review scores
Source	Rating
Degeneracion Rock	link

Give Me the Fear is the debut album of Tokyo Dragons released in September 2005. The track "Teenage Screamers" was featured in the 2004 racing game FlatOut.

== Track listing ==
1. "What the Hell" – 3:47
2. "Get 'Em Off" – 2:57
3. "Do You Wanna?" – 3:36
4. "Come On Baby" – 3:56
5. "Let It Go" – 3:36
6. "Johnny Don't Wanna Ride" – 2:54
7. "Teenage Screamers" – 3:43
8. "Ready or Not" – 4:44
9. "Burn On" – 2:55
10. "Rockin' the Stew" – 3:17
11. "Chasing the Night" – 4:55

== Singles ==
Release date	Song	UK Singles Chart
14 June 2004	"Teenage Screamers"	61
11 October 2004	"Get ' Em Off"	75
21 February 2005	"What The Hell"	59
6 February 2006	"Come On Baby"	—

The song "Teenage Screamers" was used in 2004 video game FlatOut.

== Personnel ==
- Steve Lomax – rhythm/lead guitars, lead vocals
- Mal Bruk – lead/rhythm guitars, backing vocals
- Ade Easily – bass
- Phil Martini – drums, backing vocals

== Reception ==
The Northern Echo panned the album as "awful", saying: "Like a sub-standard Guns 'N' Roses, Tokyo Dragons rattle through 11 raucous heavy rock tracks that bring nothing new to the genre. Mildly disturbing song titles such as Teenage Screamers don't help their cause."

Meanwhile, a review for the Associated Press praised the album, arguing that Tokyo Dragons were the most "faithful heirs to the glorious tradition of old-school, '70s hard rock", "taking inspiration from the best of the best." In the review, Wayne Parry wrote:

The opening track, "What the Hell," channels Kiss' "All-American Man." Next up is "Get 'em Off," which reminds the listener of AC/DC's "Riff Raff." "Do You Wanna?" has a shout-along chorus very much in the spirit of KISS' "Rock and Roll All Nite," while "Johnny Don't Wanna Ride" cops the riff from the Sex Pistols' "God Save the Queen."
