= Do Me Bad Things =

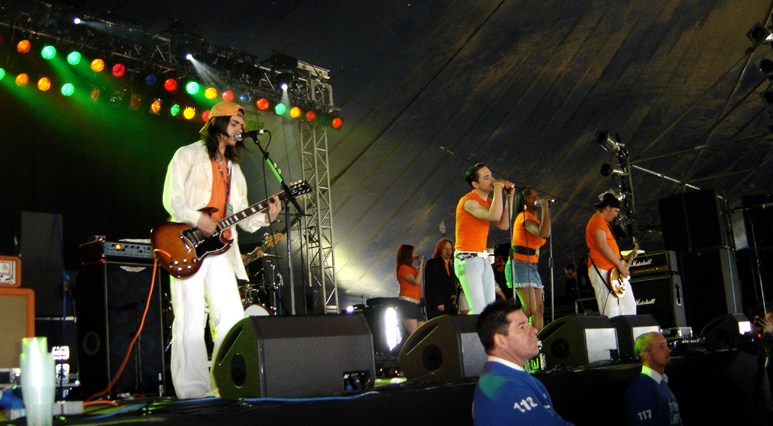
- Do Me Bad Things performing at the Radio 1 One Big Weekend 2005

Background information
- Origin: Croydon, London, England
- Genres: Soul; blues; rock; heavy metal
- Years active: 2003–2006, 2015–present
- Labels: Atlantic
- Past members: Nicolai Prowse; Chantal Brown; Mark Woods; Tom Shotton; Alex Lewis; Adam Mallett; Rich Aldhurst; Clare Macdonald-Haig; Kimberley Whalley

Do Me Bad Things are a nine-piece English blues/rock/soul/metal band from Croydon, London, England, who formed in 2003 and split up in January 2006 before re-forming for a one-off show in early 2015.

== History ==
They started out supposedly not intending to be a band, and admit to having no aspirations of fame. Do Me Bad Things (DMBT) began on 14 February 2003 with Alex Lewis, Tom Shotton and Adam Mallett deciding to create a rock trio for fun. Eventually they realised that their material needed to have three vocalists in places, and they needed another vocalist for other songs. Nicolai Prowse (vocals) had been in bands with Shotton and Rich Aldhurst when they were younger, as had Lewis. The line-up grew with the introduction of Chantal Brown, with whom Shotton had been working in a bookshop.

They spent time rehearsing and playing gigs in local venues, one of which at the Archway pub was viewed by Must Destroy Records, who signed them up to Atlantic Records. Do Me Bad Things' June 2004 release, "The Song Rides" gained airplay on Zane Lowe's BBC Radio 1 show, and earned a session with XFM's John Kennedy. Summer 2004 was spent supporting other acts, and making a name for themselves at the Reading and Leeds festival and Download Festival

October 2004 brought the release of the single "Time for Deliverance", which launched them further into the mainstream, getting regular video performances and television appearances. By November and December 2004 DMBT were touring the UK's biggest arenas supporting fellow Must Destroy band The Darkness on their Permission to Land tour.

=== Yes! album (2005–2006) ===
In 2005, their debut album, Yes! was issued, and later in June their third single, "What's Hideous", was released. It was accompanied with an appearance on CD:UK, and "What's Hideous" entered the Top 40 of the UK Singles Chart. Near the end of 2005 also saw the departure of backing vocalists Kimberley Whalley and Clare Macdonald-Haig, for undisclosed reasons.

On 11 January 2006, Do Me Bad Things officially split up. Chantal Brown is now lead vocalist for various bands, including Chrome Hoof and voodoo-themed metal outfit Vodun.

=== Reunion (2015-present) ===
In February 2015, the Do Me Bad Things Facebook page became active again and the group posted "Stayed tuned (sic) for some announcements coming in the near future," on 10 February. The band has since announced rehearsals, posted a reunion picture and has started a Twitter account, leading fans to speculate about a reunion, over nine years since they split up.

On 25 July 2015, a reunited Do Me Bad Things performed two sets at The Lexington bar in London. The band stated at the time that this was a one-off performance and it would not lead to new material. However on 18 August 2016, the band changed their Facebook profile picture to previously unseen album artwork for "Jailbreak Getaway/Power of Love". The following day on 19 August the band announced via their Facebook page that a new double-A side single would be released a day later.

== Original line-up ==
- Nicolai Prowse - Vocals
- Chantal Brown - Vocals
- Mark Woods - Vocals
- Tom Shotton - Drums, Piano, Keyboards, Guitars, Percussion and Vocals
- Alex Lewis - Guitar, Keyboards and Vocals
- Adam Mallett - Bass
- Rich Aldhurst - Guitar
- Kimberley Whalley - Backing Vocals (2003–2005, 2015-)
- Clare Macdonald-Haig - Backing Vocals (2003–2005, 2015-)

== Discography ==
=== Albums ===
- Yes! (April 2005) - No. 68 UK
  1. "Time for Deliverance"
  2. "What's Hideous"
  3. "Spezzatura"
  4. "The Song Rides"
  5. "Off the Hook"
  6. "Liv Ullman on Drums (Move in Stereo)"
  7. "Molly's Wood"
  8. "Suburban Flame"
  9. "The Daily Grind"
  10. "Hold On"
- Limited edition bonus CD
  1. "Rise of the Pontoon"
  2. "That's My Demographic"
  3. "Stop Kissing Me"
  4. "Burn Some Money"

=== Singles ===
- "Stop Kissing Me" (December 2003)
- "The Song Rides EP" (June 2004)
- "Time for Deliverance" (October 2004) - No. 57 UK
- "What's Hideous" (March 2005) - No. 33 UK
- "Move in Stereo (Liv Ullman on Drums)" (June 2005) - No. 49 UK
- "Jailbreak Getaway/Power of Love" (August 2016)
