= Tokyo Dragons =

English band

- Origin: London, England
- Genres: Hard rock
- Years active: 2001–2008
- Labels: Escapi, Island
- Past members: Steve Lomax; Mal Bruk; Phil Martini; Ade Easily; Mathias Stady
- Website: Official Site

The Tokyo Dragons were an English, London-based hard rock band. They achieved success in the UK and worldwide after releasing two successful albums and touring with Nashville Pussy, The Quireboys, Status Quo, Do Me Bad Things and Winnebago Deal.

== History ==
The band was formed by friends Steve Lomax (guitar/vocals), Mal Bruk (guitar/vocals) and Phil Martini (drums/vocals) with Ade Easily (bass). They appeared on Breaking Point, an MTV2 programme sponsored by Island Records in which ten bands were documented going through the process of being spotted, courted and then signed to a recording contract. The Tokyo Dragons were signed, and recorded their debut album, Give Me the Fear, at Rockfield Studios for Island Records in June 2004. The band released their first single, "Teenage Screamers", in June 2004. It reached number 61 in the UK Singles Chart, and the song appeared on the soundtrack for the 2005 racing game FlatOut.

Easily left the band in March 2005 and was replaced as bassist by Mathias Stady.

Give Me the Fear was released in September 2005 and entered the UK Rock Albums Chart at number 23. The following month the band released their second single, "Get 'Em Off", which entered the UK Singles Chart at number 75.

Tokyo Dragons co-headlined the first Nokia 'New School of Rock' Tour, with The Answer and The Sound Explosion. In June 2005, they appeared at the Download Festival, playing on the 'Napster Stage'.

The band recorded a second album with Kurt Bloch for Escapi Music entitled Hot Nuts, which was released in September 2007.

They split up a year later, playing their final show at the 100 Club in Oxford Street, London on 4 September 2008, in support to Girlschool. Lomax and Bruk then formed a new group, The Sabretooth Tiger Band, with Tom Shotton and Adam Mallett from the defunct band Do Me Bad Things. They played their debut gig on 5 December 2008 at The George Tavern in Whitechapel, London. Lomax subsequently formed The Sweat, who released their debut album, Heavy Sweatin', via Bandcamp. Martini became the drummer for The Quireboys, whom Tokyo Dragons had supported in 2005, and recorded albums in 2010/11 for The Union, a band formed by Luke Morley and Peter Shoulder. Martini then performed and recorded with a number of bands including I Am I, Spear Of Destiny, Joe Elliott's Down 'n' Outz, Alluri and Jim Jones and The Righteous Mind, before joining Wayward Sons, featuring lead singer Toby Jepson, whilst recording albums with Down 'n' Outz and Spear Of Destiny.

== Discography ==
=== Albums ===
- Give Me the Fear (September 2005)
- Hot Nuts (September 2007)

=== Singles ===
Release date	Song	UK Singles Chart
14 June 2004	"Teenage Screamers"	61
11 October 2004	"Get ' Em Off"	75
21 February 2005	"What the Hell"	59
6 February 2006	"Come On Baby"	-
