= Triggerfinger (album) =

Studio album by Triggerfinger
- Released: 26 January 2004
- Recorded: Redtape Studio, Antwerp, Belgium
- Genres: Hard rock, blues rock
- Length: 47:36
- Label: Green L.F.ant Records
- Producer: Triggerfinger

Triggerfinger chronology
Triggerfinger (2004)	Faders Up (2007)

Singles from Triggerfinger
- 1. "Inner Peace" Released: 2003; 2. "Camaro" Released: 2003

Triggerfinger is the self-titled debut album of Belgian rock band Triggerfinger. Released on 26 January 2004 via Green L.F.ant Records, the album features the singles "Inner Peace" and "Camaro", the latter of which features guitar riffs based on the song Kashmir by English rock band Led Zeppelin. In 2017, Classic Rock stated that this album "didn't do much" compared to the band's later albums.

== Track listing ==
All tracks are written by Ruben Block, except where noted.

No.	Title	Writer(s)	Length
1.	"Inner Peace"		3:33
2.	"Lil' Teaser"		4:16
3.	"Today"		3:32
4.	"Commotion"	J.C. Fogerty	5:36
5.	"Drivin'"	Block; Martine van Hoof	4:14
6.	"Back On Track"		4:22
7.	"On My Knees"		4:13
8.	"Hunt You Down"		3:26
9.	"Faders Up"		4:57
10.	"Camaro"	Block; van Hoof	4:02
11.	"Au Suivant"	Jacques Brel	5:25

== Personnel ==
Credits adapted from liner notes.

Triggerfinger

- Ruben Block – lead vocals, guitar, 6-bass, lap steel guitar, keyboard
- Paul Van Bruystegem ("Monsieur Paul") – bass guitar, backing vocals
- Mario Goossens – drums, backing vocals

Additional musicians

- David Poltrock – additional keyboards (1)
- The Mob – strings (10)

Technical

- Ruben Block – recording
- Triggerfinger – production, mixing (1–8)
- Gert Jacobs – mixing (1)
- Filip "Redtape" Goris – recording, mixing (2–8)
- Jo Francken – mixing (2–8)
- Raf Roesems – mastering, mixing (9–10)
