= Das Pop =

Belgian band

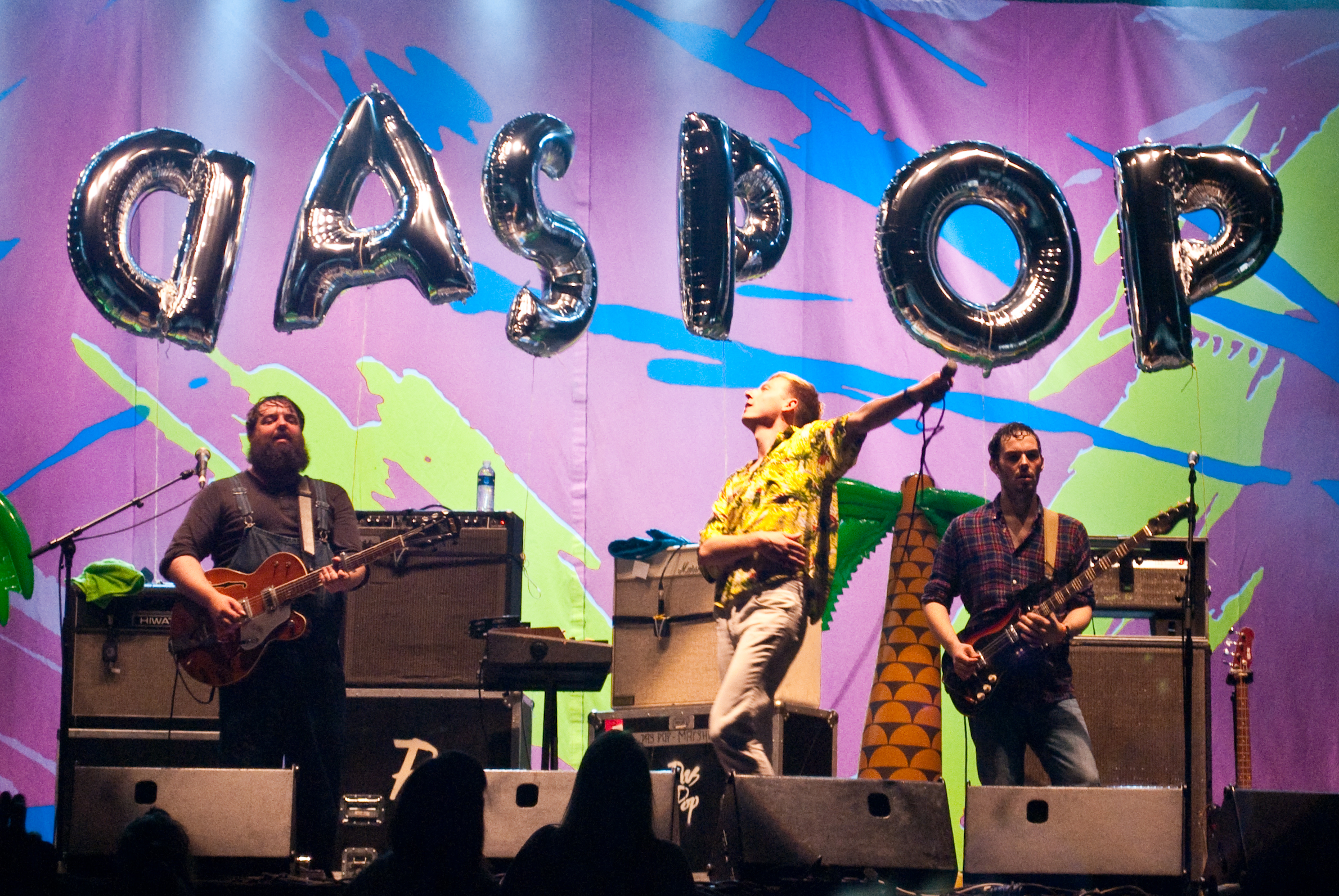
- Das Pop performing in 2010

Background information
- Origin: Ghent, Belgium
- Genres: Indie pop, pop rock
- Years active: 1994–2012, 2024-now
- Labels: PIAS, Capitol, EMI, N.E.W.S.
- Members: Bent Van Looy; Niek Meul
- Past members: Lieven Moors; Tom Kestens; Reindhard Vanbergen; Matt Eccles
- Website: www.daspop.com

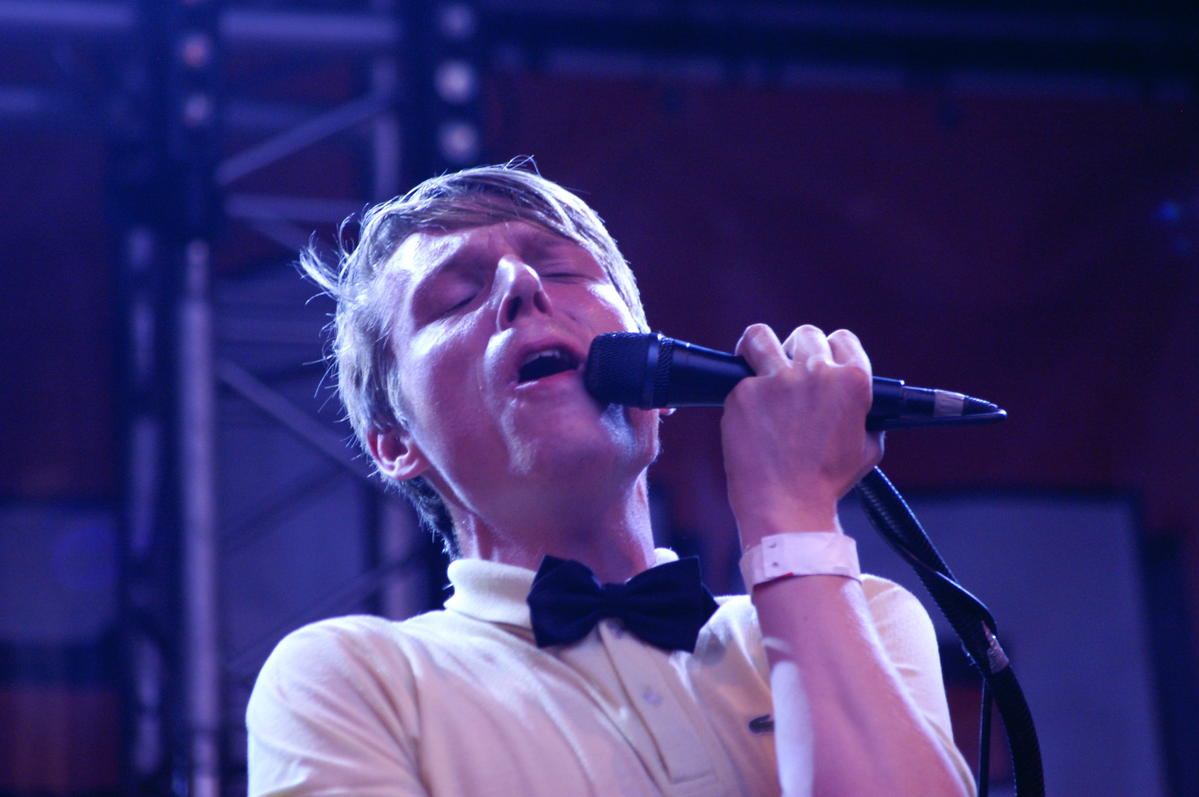
Bent Van Looy

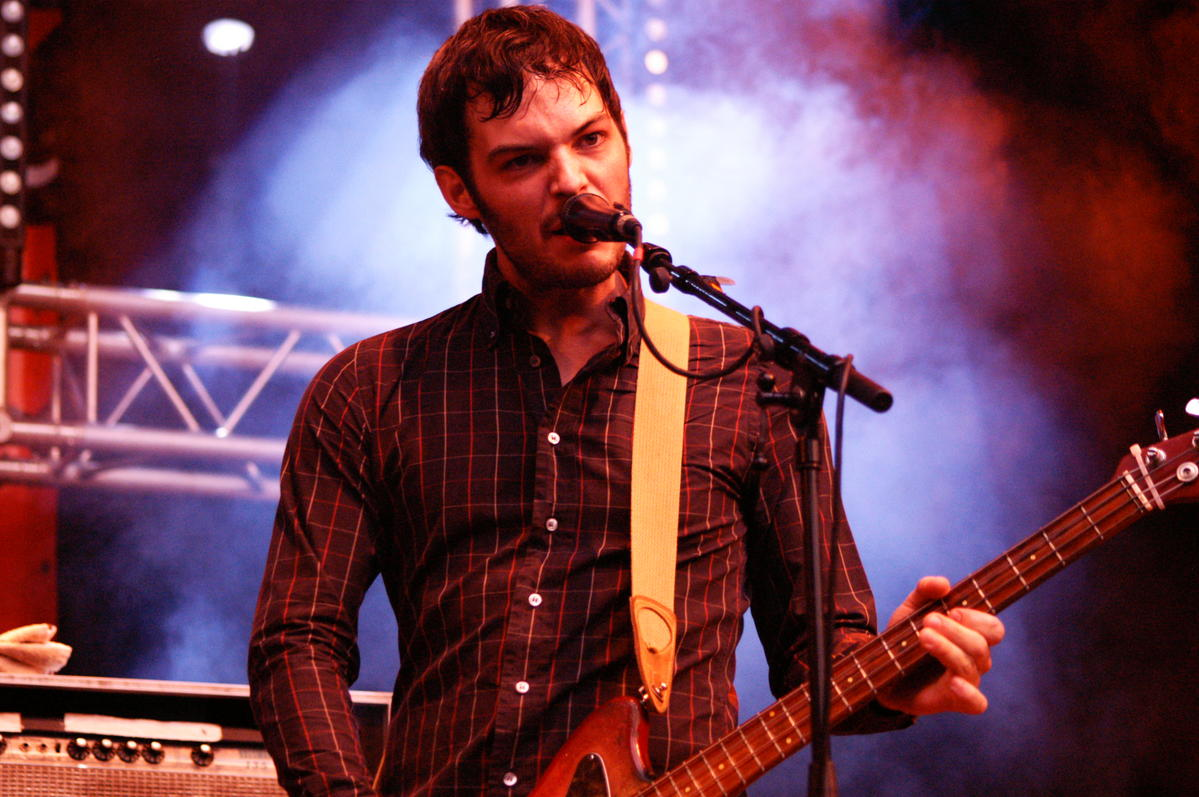
Niek Meul

Das Pop is a Belgian band founded in Ghent by school friends Reinhard Vanbergen, Niek Meul, Lieven Moors and Bent Van Looy. They perform in English, but have also released a German-language version of their hit song You as Du.

== Biography ==
Das Pop was initially called Things to Come, but the band changed its name to Das Pop when Tom Kestens joined the band. In 1998, they won Belgium's influential HUMO's Rock Rally contest.

Tom Kestens and Lieven Moors later left the band, and in 2007 New Zealander Matt Eccles (formerly drums in Betchadupa) joined the band as the new drummer. In January 2008 Das Pop released "Fool For Love" on UK independent label Prestel Records. The release featured remixes from French DJ SebastiAn and Yuksek, and was called a "monumental new single from the Belgian electro band" in the Culture section of UK newspaper The Sunday Times.

In 2008 Das Pop toured extensively with other acts including Soulwax, The Feeling, Gossip, The Kills, Alphabeat and Justice. They also played at many festivals including Rockness, V Festival, Reading and Leeds, Pukkelpop as well as Lovebox and Glastonbury where they played three sets in one day across three different stages.

In 2010 the song "Never Get Enough" was featured in Gossip Girl episode "Goodbye, Columbia".

In 2011 the band recorded their album "The Game" in Hoboken, New Jersey at Water Music Studios, produced and engineered by Terry Manning. The album was mixed in Manning's Nassau, Bahamas studio.

Bent van Looy toured as MC through Europe along concert halls like Ethias Arena, Brixton Academy, Telefonica Open de Madrid, Palacio da bolsa and many others with Soulwaxmas. That is the Christmas party organised by Soulwax

Das Pop member Reinhard Vanbergen produced albums for The Hickey Underworld, Drums Are For Parades and Goose. Entropology, the debut album of School is Cool, was recorded at Motormusic Studios and was also produced & mixed by Vanbergen. The album was released in 2011.

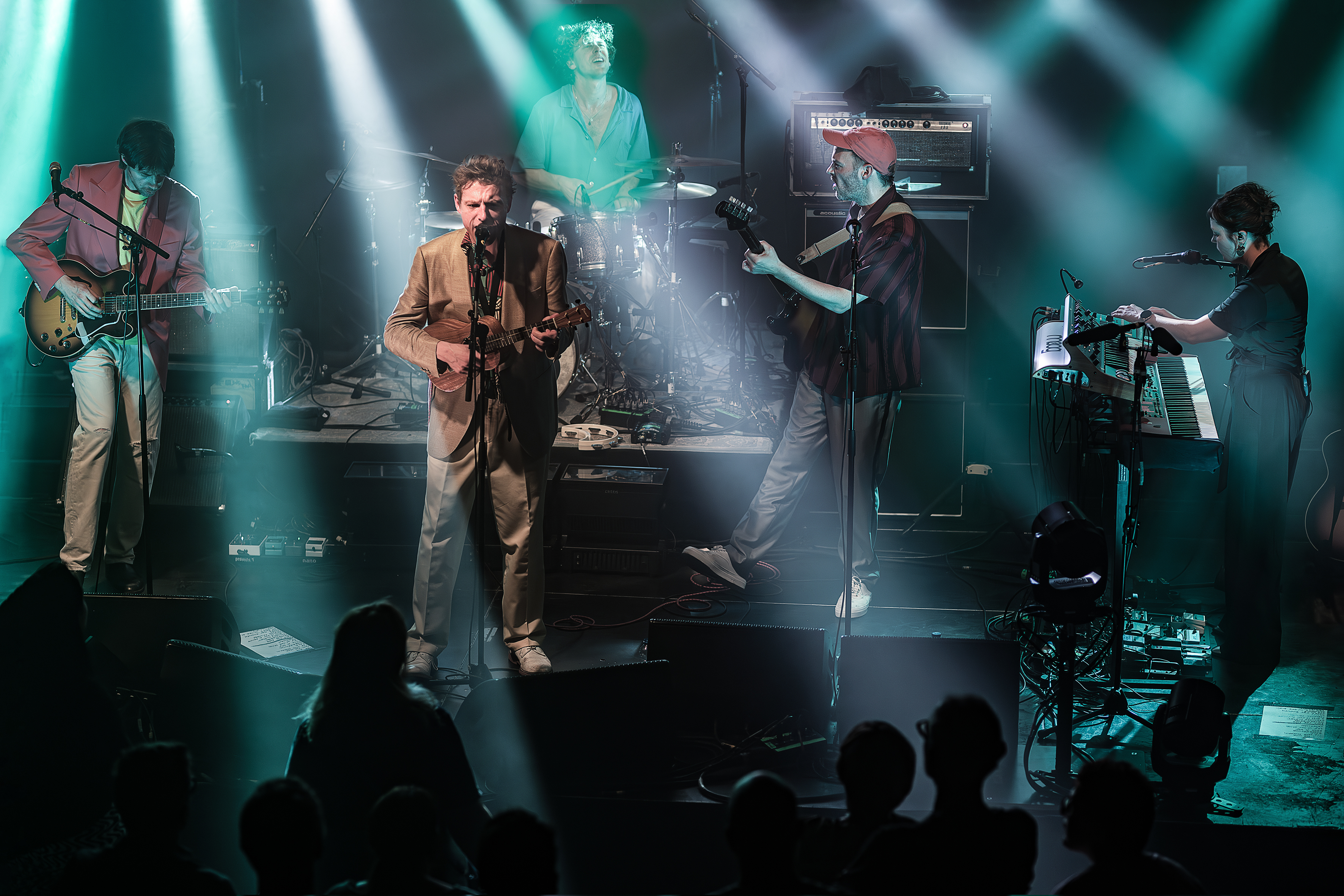
Das Pop reunion in 2025

On 24 November 2012, Van Looy announced a break. The band would not perform for a year. The last concert was given on 20 December that year in Eeklo. In 2024, they announce a comeback.

== Discography ==
=== Albums ===
Year	Album	Peak positions	Notes
Year	Album	BEL (Vl)	Notes
2000	I ♥	16	
2003	The Human Thing	6	
2009	Das Pop	7	Track list: 1. Underground; 2. You Don't Wanna Know; 3. Wings; 4. Saturday Night pt. 1; 5. Never Get Enough; 6. The Last Night; 7. Fool for Love; 8. Try Again; 9. Let Me In; 10. Saturday Night pt. 2; 11. Girl Be a Man; 12. September; 13. Feelgood Factors; 14. Tired (bonus track)
2011	The Game	13	Track list: 1. The Game; 2. Skip The Rope; 3. Flowers In The Dirt; 4. Girl Wolf; 5. Fair Weather Friends; 6. Wronging The Rights; 7. I Me Mine; 8. The Thunder; 9. Gold; 10. A Kiss is Not a Crime; 11. Yesterday

=== Singles ===
Year	Album	Peak positions		Album
Year	Album	BEL (Vl) Ultratop	BEL (Vl) Ultratip	Album
1998	"A Different Beat"	–		I ♥
1998	"The Little Boy"	–		
2003	"Telephone love"	–	13	The Human Thing
2008	"Fool for Love"	–	7	Das Pop
2008	"Underground"	–	6	Das Pop
2009	"Never Get Enough"	9		Das Pop
2010	"Wings"	30		Das Pop
2011	"The Game"	15		The Game
2011	"Skip the Rope"	–	8	The Game
2011	"Gold"	–	21	The Game
2011	"Yesterday"	–	18	The Game
2010	"Thunder & Lightning"	–	9	
