= The Black Box Revelation =

Belgian rock band

Black Box Revelation
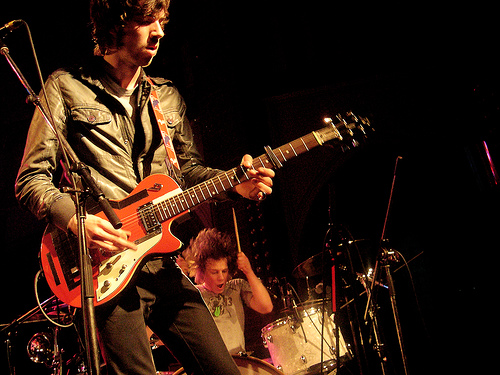
- BBR in 2007, as support act for dEUS

Background information
- Origin: Dilbeek, Flemish Brabant, Belgium
- Genres: Garage rock, blues rock
- Years active: 2005–present
- Labels: T for Tunes, PIAS, Merovingian Music
- Members: Jan Paternoster; Dries Van Dijck
- Website: Official website

Black Box Revelation (BBR, previously named The Black Box Revelation) is a Belgian garage rock band. It was formed in 2005 by vocalist and guitarist Jan Paternoster and drummer Dries Van Dijck. The band achieved great reviews with their debut Set Your Head on Fire and second album Silver Threats. In 2011, the band released their third album My Perception, including the hit singles "Rattle My Heart" and "My Perception".

== Career ==
=== Formation ===
Jan Paternoster and Dries Van Dijck, two friends from Dilbeek, started playing together (with Jan's brother Tim Paternoster as vocalist and Christoph Marquez on second guitar) as “The Mighty Generators”, at the respective ages of 12 and 14 years old. It was during this period that the two of them started jamming together as well. These jam sessions would lay the foundation to their new group: Black Box Revelation.

In 2006 they arrived second, while The Hickey Underworld took the first spot, in Belgium's influential Humo's Rock Rally contest. The Mighty Generators made it to the quarter-finals.

The New York Times wrote: "Every so often they strip the music down to something slow and bluesy. But the Black Box Revelation isn't purely retro. They are just as happy with a drum-machine beat and a heap of overdubbed percussion, as long as the music makes its happy, trashy crash."

In Europe they toured with dEUS, Ghinzu, General Fiasco, The Raveonettes, Eagles Of Death Metal, Iggy Pop and others. They played multiple times at festivals such as Rock Werchter, Pukkelpop, Pinkpop, Sziget Festival and Rock en Seine.

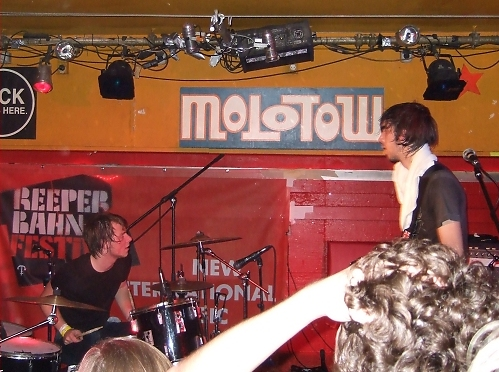
Concert in the Molotow Club, Hamburg, 2008

In June 2008, the Black Box Revelation started their first tour in the United States. They performed gigs in San Diego, West Hollywood and New York City.

Since then they played a couple of times at SXSW and they toured through the United States in June 2011 with the Meat Puppets, played at Bonnaroo Music Festival, on tour with The Morning After Girls (from 19 September to 18 October 2011) and on tour with Meat Puppets from 6–13 November 2011.

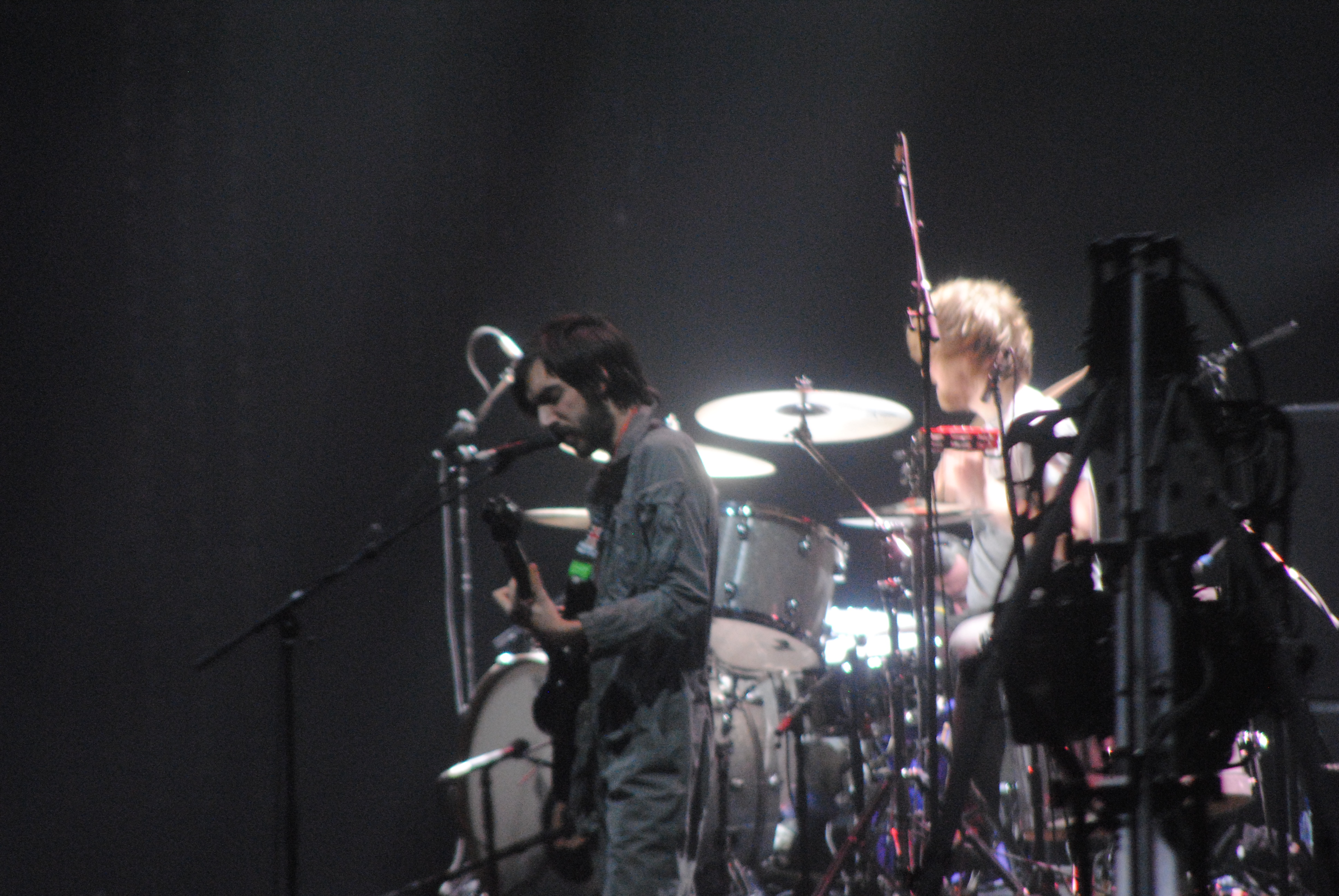
Black Box Revelation in Sportpaleis, Antwerp, 2011

=== Introducing: The Blackbox Revelation ===
In 2007 the duo released their debut EP. The EP was supported by a music video for "Kill for Peace (And Peace Will Die)". The Belgian press was unanimously enthusiastic and this resulted in many club-gigs. During the summer of 2007 the band played at the big open-air festivals Dour and Pukkelpop.

=== Set Your Head on Fire ===
The Black Box Revelation began recording their album Set Your Head on Fire in mid-2007. The album was produced by Triggerfinger drummer Mario Goossens, mixed in Los Angeles by Greg Gordon (who had previously worked with Wolfmother, Jet and Soulwax), and mastered in New York by Fred Kevorkian (Iggy Pop, U2, The White Stripes). Over 30,000 copies were downloaded in Belgium alone.

Their single "I Think I Like You" rapidly rose to the top of the radio charts. Peter Afterman and the Major League Baseball club Pittsburgh Pirates later bought the rights to "I Think I Like You".

Plug in Music wrote: "A rock party that seems unwilling to end. Like the 60s garage bands they were influenced by, Black Box Revelation know that sometimes rock is most effective when it is simple. With this philosophy in mind, the band keeps their riffs repeating and their lyrics from being over analytical. Black Box Revelation's debut seem strategically constructed while still retaining a reckless and raw sound."

=== Silver Threats ===
In February 2010 they released their second album Silver Threats, with the singles "High on a Wire", "Sleep While Moving", "Do I Know You" and "Love Licks". This album was also produced by Triggerfinger drummer Mario Goossens, mixed in Los Angeles by Greg Gordon (who had previously worked with, and mastered in New York by Fred Kevorkian.

Contact Music wrote, "There's scuzzy, full throttle blues romps sitting comfortably next to more quiet moments. Silver Threats is an album that sits just on the edge of chaos, providing a brilliant musical thrill ride, almost from start to finish."

Silver Threats reached number one on the Flemish Ultratop albums chart in February 2010. In January 2011 the Black Box Revelation won two Music Industry Awards in Flanders, for best Live Act and best Rock/Alternative music.

=== My Perception ===
The single "Lust or Love" was released on 14 February 2011, whilst the band was working on their third album with Alain Johannes (Queens of the Stone Age) in Hollywood, LA.

Black Box Revelation released a single on 1 June 2011 titled "Rattle My Heart". It was the lead single from their third album, My Perception, which was released worldwide on 30 September 2011. They released "My Perception" as the follow-up single.

Black Box Revelation received support from its American label Merovee Records, partially owned by talk show star David Letterman.

The band toured several months in the United States to promote their third album and played as opening act for different major acts such as Jane's Addiction and Liam Gallagher's Beady Eye. HardrockHaven stated about the band: "The Black Box Revelation got the crowd on their feet and dancing with their growling, bluesy riffs and intense drums. Watching this duo play brings to mind, The White Stripes, The Black Keys and Middle Class Rut. Each song was a different adventure of sounds that took the listener into a world surrounded by nothing but tearing guitar and deep percussion, you could do nothing but listen and be impressed. This is a band whose star will continue to rise and the climb will be fun to watch".

== In popular culture ==
- On 23 August 2009, the song "Cold Cold Hands" was featured on FX in episode 7 of the 6th season of Entourage.
- On 4 October 2011, the song "I Think I Like You" was featured on FX in episode 5 of the 4th season of Sons of Anarchy, "Brick"
- On 25 October 2011, the song "Where Has All This Mess Begun" was featured on FX in episode 8 of the 4th season of Sons of Anarchy, "Family Recipe"
- On June 12, 2012, the Black Box Revelation played their song "High on a Wire" in the Late Show with David Letterman.
- "High on a Wire" played during an episode of MTV's Teen Wolf (2x02 "Chaos Rising")

== Equipment ==
Jan Paternoster is known to play a Gibson CS-356 hollow-body electric guitar as well as a James Trussart Deluxe SteelCaster (a Fender Thinline Telecaster-style guitar with a hollow metal body) with an SH pickup configuration. He has also been seen using a Hofner electric guitar. He uses a Vox AC30 and Blackstar Amplification.

In 2011 on the US tour he played an early 60's Fender Stratocaster and a Gibson Flying V with Blackstar Amps.

== Discography ==
=== Albums ===
- Set Your Head on Fire (2007, T for Tunes, PIAS)
- Silver Threats (2010, T for Tunes, PIAS)
- My Perception (2011, T for Tunes, PIAS, Merovee)
- Highway Cruiser (2015)
- Tattooed Smiles (2018)
- Poetic Rivals (2023)

=== EPs ===
- Introducing: The Blackbox Revelation (2007)
- Shiver of Joy (2011, Merovee)

=== Singles ===
- "I Think I Like You"
- "Gravity Blues"
- "Set Your Head on Fire"
- "Never Alone / Always Together"
- "Love, Love Is on My Mind"
- "High on a Wire"
- "Do I Know You"
- "Sleep While Moving"
- "Love Licks"
- "Lust or Love"
- "Rattle My Heart"
- "My Perception"
- "Bitter"
- "Skin"
- "Sweet as Cinnamon"
- "Gloria" (featuring The Gospel Queens)
