= Winterville (band) =

English blues rock band

Background information
- Also known as: The Others, The Keytones
- Origin: Chester-le-Street, County Durham, England
- Genres: Rock; blues; post-grunge
- Years active: 2003–2007
- Label: Toxxic Records
- Members: Peter Shoulder; Joss Clapp; Mario Goossens
- Website: http://www.wintervilleonline.com/

Winterville were an English blues rock band, whose sound was influenced by the 1960s Blues sound of bands like Cream, and the 1990s Grunge sound of bands like Soundgarden. They released several singles and one album.

When the band formed in 2003, they were named "The Others", under which they released their first EP. With the emergence of another band of the same name (see The Others (band)), the name was changed to "The Keytones". Again, another band had the name, so the band settled on the name "Winterville". There is also an Australian artist of the same name, but neither act has taken any steps to change their name.

== Formation ==
Though Peter Shoulder played live shows with several different acts before Winterville, he did not release any recordings until he met bassist Joss Clapp and the Belgian drummer Mario Goossens. Both had other bands at the time, but when Peter came to them with material in September 2003, the band went into rehearsals at Northern Recordings in Consett, County Durham, which was the first time they played together. They then moved to Chapel Studios in Lincolnshire, where they began work recording songs for The Others EP, which was to be their first commercial release.

== Career ==
In late 2003, Winterville played their first live shows as the support for the long-standing British blues-rock act, Thunder. They then went on to play their own gigs at smaller venues. In March 2004 the band played as part of the South by Southwest music festival in Austin, Texas, where they were received very favourably. At the start of 2005, Thin Lizzy guitarist Scott Gorham personally requested that Winterville support his band on their tour. Touring with such well-established artists as Thunder and Thin Lizzy helped Winterville reach an audience greatly appropriate to their musical style and thus enlarge their fanbase.

In early 2005, Shoulder collaborated with blues artist, Little Milton, on what was to be his final album, Think of Me. He wrote "Thinking of you", "Second hand love" and "Gonna find me somebody to love". He also played lead and rhythm guitar on all three tracks. At the 2006 Blues Music Awards, "Thinking of You" won the Best Song Award.

In between these tours, Winterville released The Fallout Sessions EP, their first single "Shotgun Smile", and its follow-up "Under My Skin". Their debut album, Everything in Moderation was released on 14 November 2005, and a third single from the album, "Breathe" followed. The band performed at the Download Festival in 2006.

== Split ==
On Wednesday 3 January 2007, all information and features on Winterville's official website were removed and replaced with a single page displaying the following message:

We are very sorry to announce that Winterville have split up, and all future shows have been cancelled. Many thanks to all of you who have supported us over the past 3 years.

— Peter, Joss & Mario, Wintervilleonline.com

The split was extremely sudden and the reason is still unknown amongst fans. The band were in the process of working on material for their second album.

Singer and guitarist Peter Shoulder had been working on solo material, but proceeded to the band The Union with former rock band Thunder co-songwriter and lead guitarist, Luke Morley.

Drummer Mario Goossens returned to Belgium and became successful as the drummer of Triggerfinger. Goossens already played in Hooverphonic and the Flemish bands Noordkaap and Monza (band). He also produced the first album of The Blackbox Revelation, "Set Your Head on Fire", two albums of the post-metal/sludge metal band Steak Number Eight and also the self-titled debut of the indie band Team William.

== Discography ==
Date	Title	Label	Notes
17 November 2003	The Others EP	Unknown	Released when the band were known as "The Others"
21 February 2005	The Fallout Sessions EP	Unknown	Track listing: Shotgun Smile, Last Legs, Breathe
23 May 2005	Shotgun Smile Single	Toxxic Records	Released on CD single and signed 7" Vinyl with B-side "Penny For the Fool"
10 October 2005	Under My Skin Single	Toxxic Records	Released as CD single and iTunes download with B-side "Stand Here and Wait" and MPEG-4 live video of "Shotgun Smile"
14 November 2005	Everything in Moderation	Toxxic Records	Debut album with 12 Tracks, released on CD and iTunes download
2 March 2006	Absinthe Sessions EP	Toxxic Records	Released for limited time at gigs only with acoustic tracks "Hide Within", "Mock Halo", "I don't Blame You" Later given limited release via the website.
20 March 2006	Breathe Single	Toxxic Records	Released on 7" Vinyl and iTunes download with B-side "Hole Thru My Head"
