= The Hickey Underworld =

Belgian alternative rock band

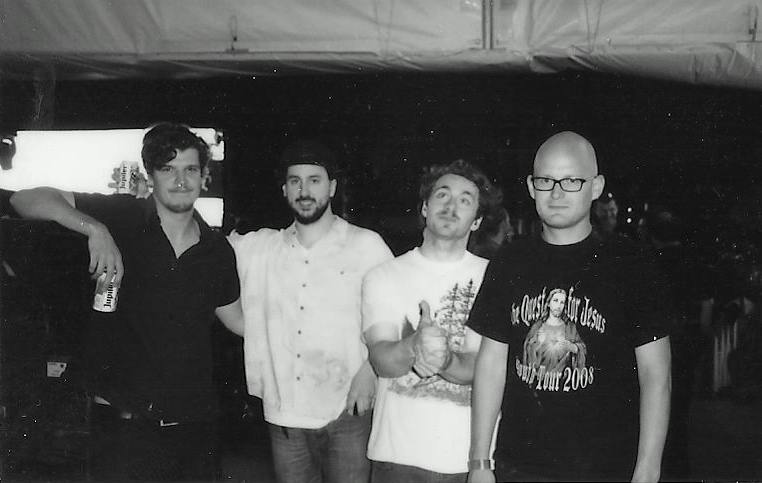
- THU at Rock Werchter 2012

Background information
- Origin: Antwerp, Belgium
- Genres: Alternative rock, grunge
- Years active: 2004-present
- Labels: V2 Records,PIAS, Naïve
- Members: Younes Faltakh; Jonas Govaerts; Jimmy Wouters; Yorgos Tsakiridis
- Past members: Sebastiaan Weyler / Tim Vanhamel
- Website: http://www.thehickeyunder.world/

The Hickey Underworld is a Belgian alternative rock band from Antwerp. They named themselves after a song that appears on the album Plays Pretty for Baby, by Washington D.C. post-punk rockers Nation of Ulysses. In 2006, the band won Belgium's influential Humo's Rock Rally. In 2009, they released their self-titled debut album The Hickey Underworld. Their second album I'm Under The House, I'm Dying was released in 2012 and their third album Ill was released in 2015.

== Members ==
- Younes Faltakh (Vocals, Guitar)
- Jonas Govaerts (Guitar)
- Jimmy Wouters (Drums)
- Yorgos Tsakiridis (Bass)

== Discography ==
=== Studio albums ===
- The Hickey Underworld (2009)
- I'm Under The House, I'm Dying (2012)
- III (2015)
- Cold Sun (2026)

=== Singles ===
- Mystery Bruise (2008)
- Future Words (2009)
- Blonde Fire (2009)
- Whistling (2012)
- The Frog (2012)
- High School Lawyer (2015)
- Living On Big Foot (2023)
- Wall On The Fly (2023)
- Euromancer (2025)
- Constant Wave On A Rock (2025)
- Keep (2026)
- Cold Sun (2026)
