= Triggerfinger (band) =

Belgian rock band

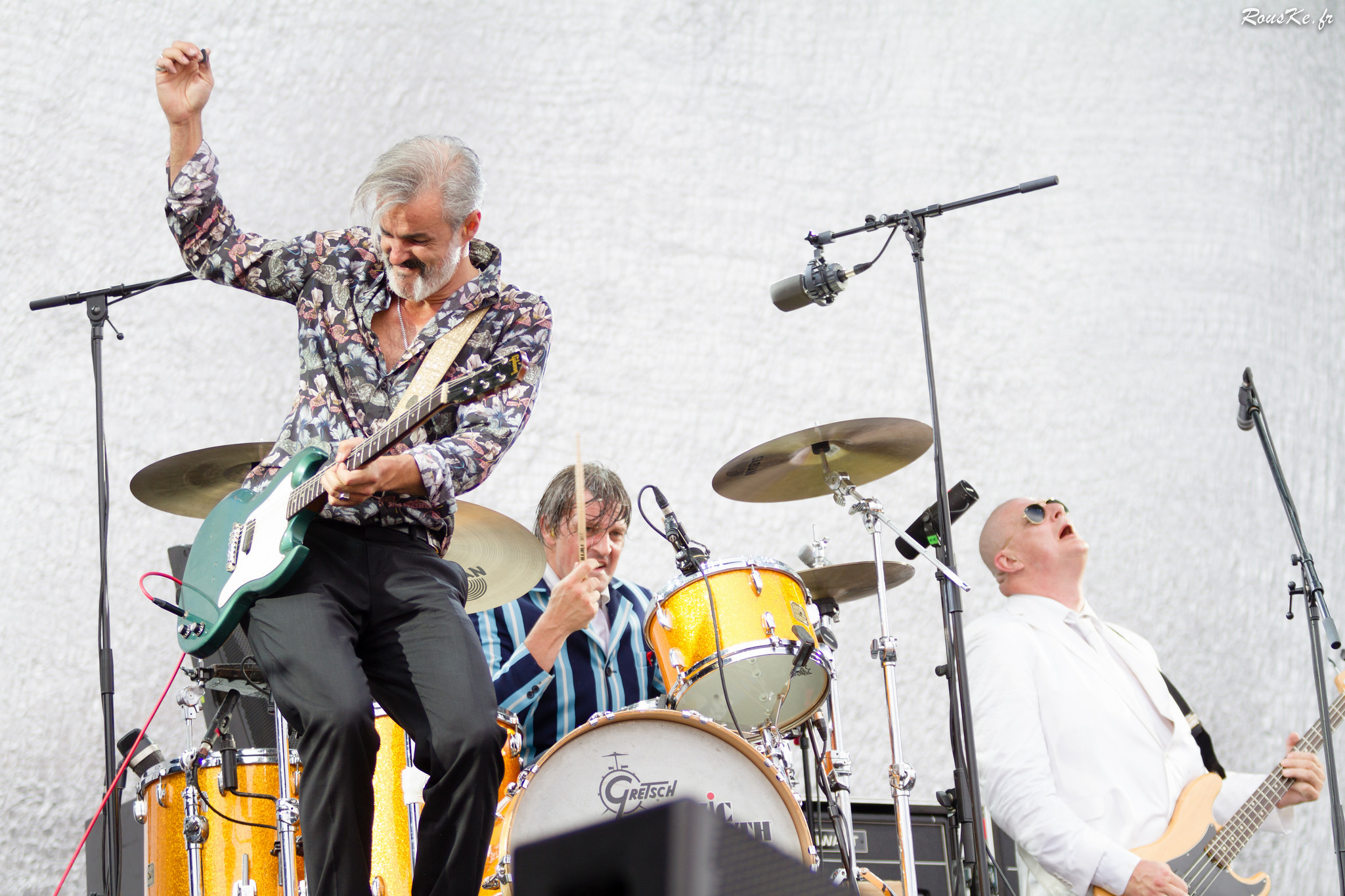
- Triggerfinger performing in 2014

Background information
- Origin: Lier, Belgium
- Genres: Hard rock, blues rock, indie rock, stoner
- Years active: 1998–present
- Labels: Excelsior Recordings, Mascot Records
- Members: Ruben Block; Mario Goossens
- Past members: Wladimir Geels; Paul Van Bruystegem
- Website: triggerfinger.net

Triggerfinger is a Belgian rock band from Lier, Belgium, formed in 1998. The band consists of vocalist and guitarist Ruben Block and Mario Goossens (formerly of Winterville) as drummer. Bassist Paul Van Bruystegem left in 2023, his final concert formed their third live album Faders Up 3.

== Musical career ==
The band gained popularity while performing prior to the band's debut album. They released their self-titled debut album Triggerfinger in 2004, after previously having released the singles "Inner Peace" and "Camaro" from the album. The album was well received by rock fans, with the band's sound being compared to bands such as Queens of the Stone Age, by the younger audience, and Led Zeppelin, by the older rock fans.

The album was followed by a live album called Faders Up, which featured several of their previous album's songs as well as a few covers of other bands. The following year, they released their next studio album called What Grabs Ya?, which, despite efforts, failed to make the band break through. In 2009, What Grabs Ya? was re-issued, with several new songs added to the track list.

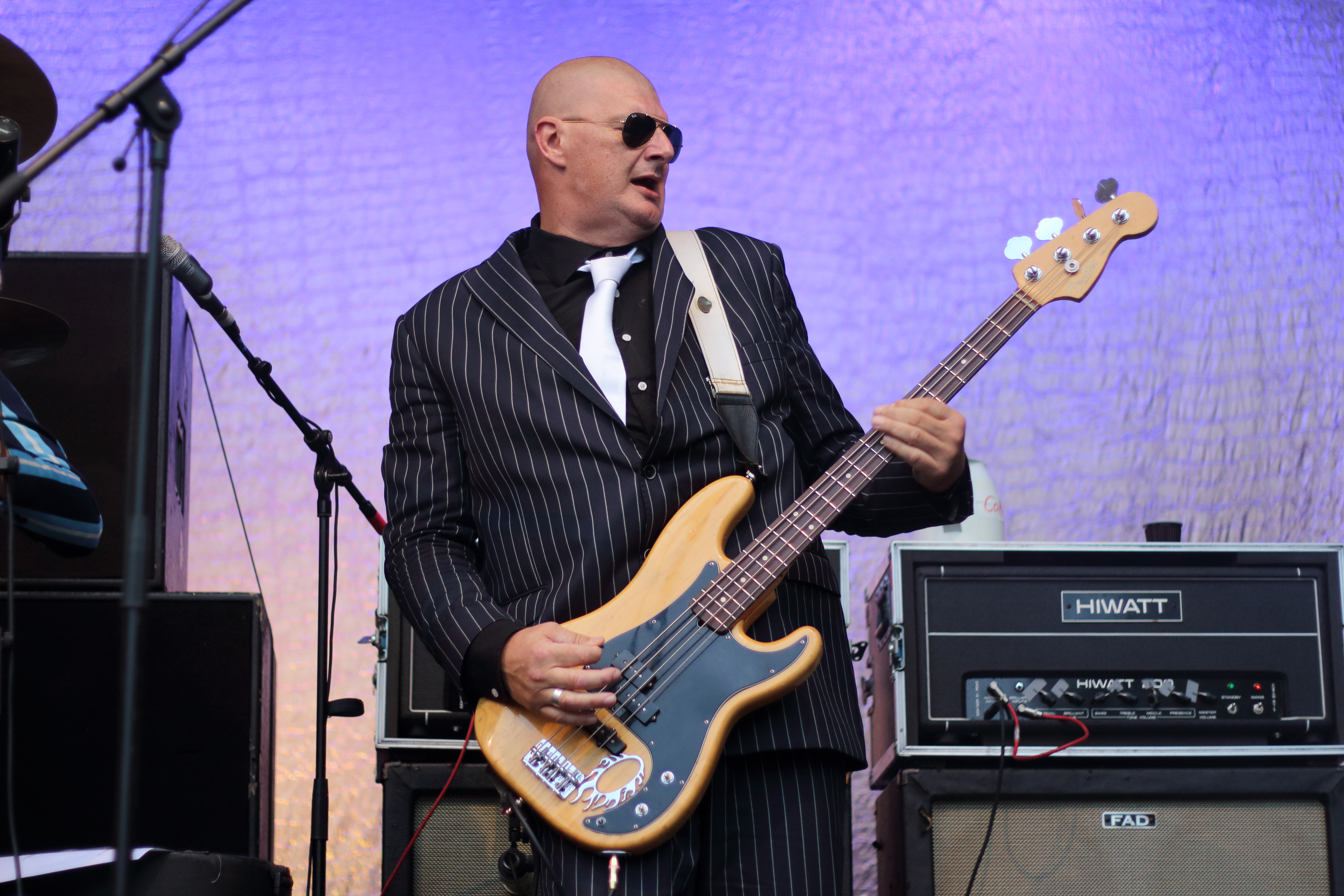
Paul Van Bruystegem at the PictureOn Festival 2014

The third studio album, All This Dancin' Around, was released in November 2010. The recordings of this album took place in the Sound City Studios in North Hollywood, California. The release of this album managed to increase the band's popularity with moderate success.

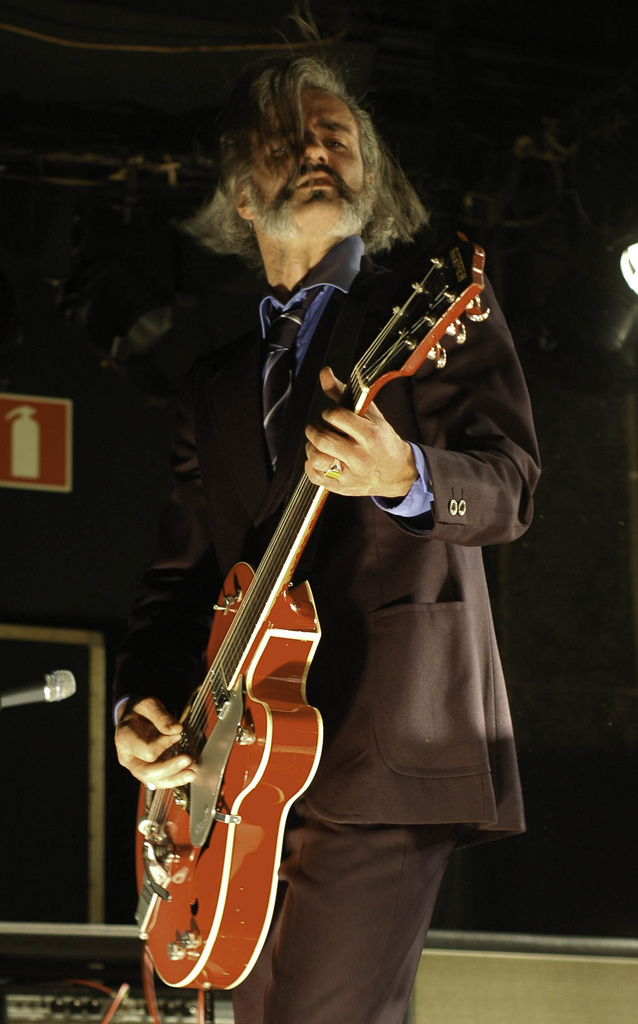
Ruben Block in 2010

They are listed as support act in many European dates of the 2011 tour of the band Within Temptation.

In April 2012, an acoustic cover of Lykke Li's pop hit "I Follow Rivers" reached number one in Belgium and abroad in the Netherlands and Austria.

On 7 July 2012 they performed before the Wladimir Klitschko vs. Tony Thompson heavyweight title fight, which took place in Bern, Switzerland.

On 8 December 2012 they won four Belgian Music Industry Awards or MIAs (hit of the year, best group, best alternative music and best live-act).

The band supported the Rolling Stones on 6 July 2013 during the Barclaycard Summer Time Festival in Hyde Park, London.

On 4 November 2013 they started recording their fourth studio album in Los Angeles, which was released on 18 April 2014. The name of the album is By Absence Of The Sun.

The band toured over Europe the following years.

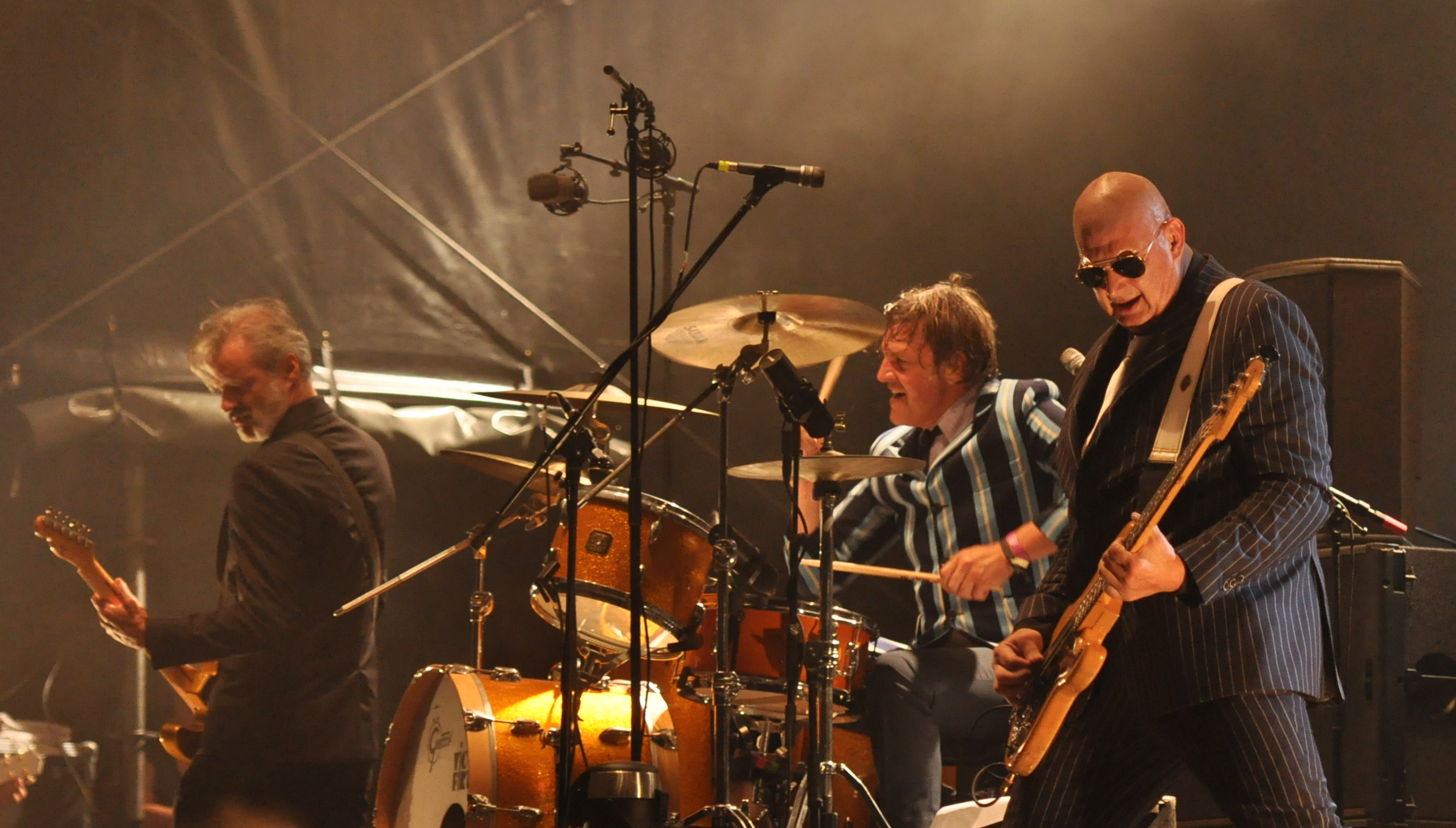
Triggerfinger at Rocken am Brocken, Germany in 2014

In 2017, Triggerfinger signed to Mascot Records and released their fifth studio album: Colossus.

In February 2023, after more than 20 years with the band, bassist Paul Van Bruystegem stepped down due to health reasons and to focus on his own projects. On 18 June 2023, they performed at TW Classic with Geoffrey Burton on bass, replacing Van Bruystegem since his departure.

After battling a long period of ill health, the death of Paul Van Bruystegem, nicknamed Lange Polle, was announced on 4 October 2025, at the age of 66.

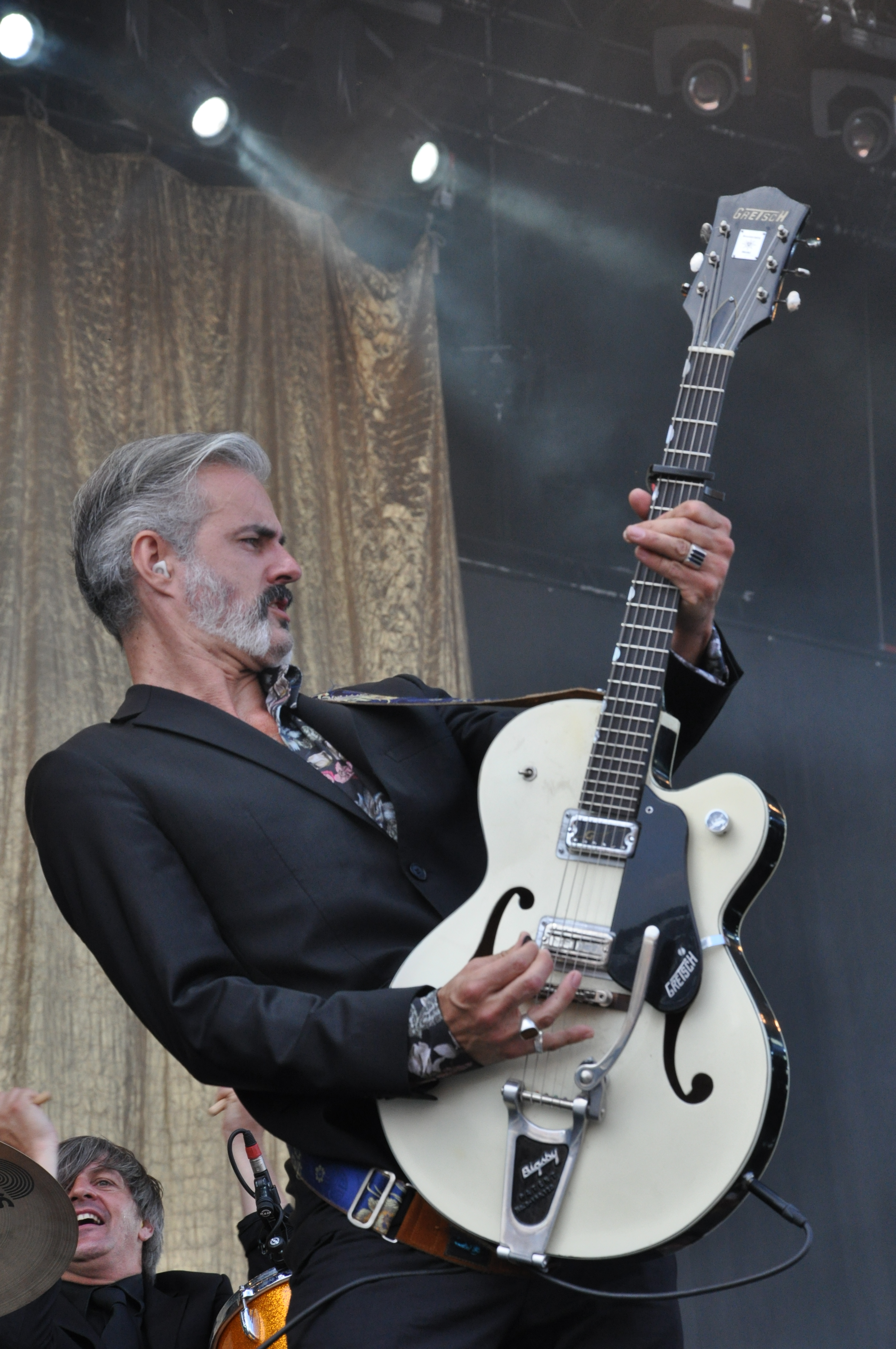
Triggerfinger at Rock am Ring in 2014

== Discography ==
Studio albums

- Triggerfinger (2004)
- What Grabs Ya? (2008)
- All This Dancin' Around (2010)
- By Absence of the Sun (2014)
- Colossus (2017)
- Tarmac (2026)

Live albums

- Faders Up (2007)
- Faders Up 2 (2012)
- Faders Up 3 (2024)

Extended plays

- Driveby (2013)
