= Motel Mozaïque =

Motel Mozaïque Festival
- Genre: Music, Art, Theatre
- Dates: April
- Locations: Rotterdam, Netherlands
- Years active: 2001–present
- Website: www.motelmozaique.nl

Motel Mozaïque is a cultural organisation, based in Rotterdam, Netherlands. Founded in 2001 by Harry Hamelink, Motel Mozaïque focuses on music, art, dance, guided tours and multi-disciplinary performances.

Motel Mozaïque showcases new and upcoming movements in different art disciplines and each year organizes several cultural events such as the international arts and music festival MOMO Festival, talent development projects and a series of concerts in different venues of Rotterdam.

Several locations cooperate during the festival's weekend, including WORM, Rotown. The festival offers a free program at the Schouwburgplein. The latest edition took place in April 2025.

== Editions ==
Previous editions of MOMO Festival featured Big Thief, Black Country, New Road, Sylvie Kreusch, Jockstrap (band), Eefje de Visser, Black Country, New Road, Apparat (musician), Panda Bear (band), Nilufer Yanya, Fontaines D.C., Black Midi, Tamino, Amenra, Thundercat, Shame (band), Warhaus, Amos Ben-Tal & Spinvis, Damien Jurado, Protomartyr, The Notwist, Kae Tempest, Villagers, The Staves, Will Butler, Asgeir, Jungle (band), George Ezra, Kurt Vile, Angel Olsen, Patrick Watson, Balthazar, Blaudzun, The Maccabees, Belle & Sebastian, James Blake, and Lykke Li.
