= IEV (disambiguation) =

IEV is the IATA code of Kyiv International Airport (Zhuliany).

IEV may also refer to:

- International Electrotechnical Vocabulary, technical term collection, managed by IEC
- Indo Europeesch Verbond, a social movement and political organisation founded in 1919
