= J. Bernardt =

Belgian musician (born 1987)

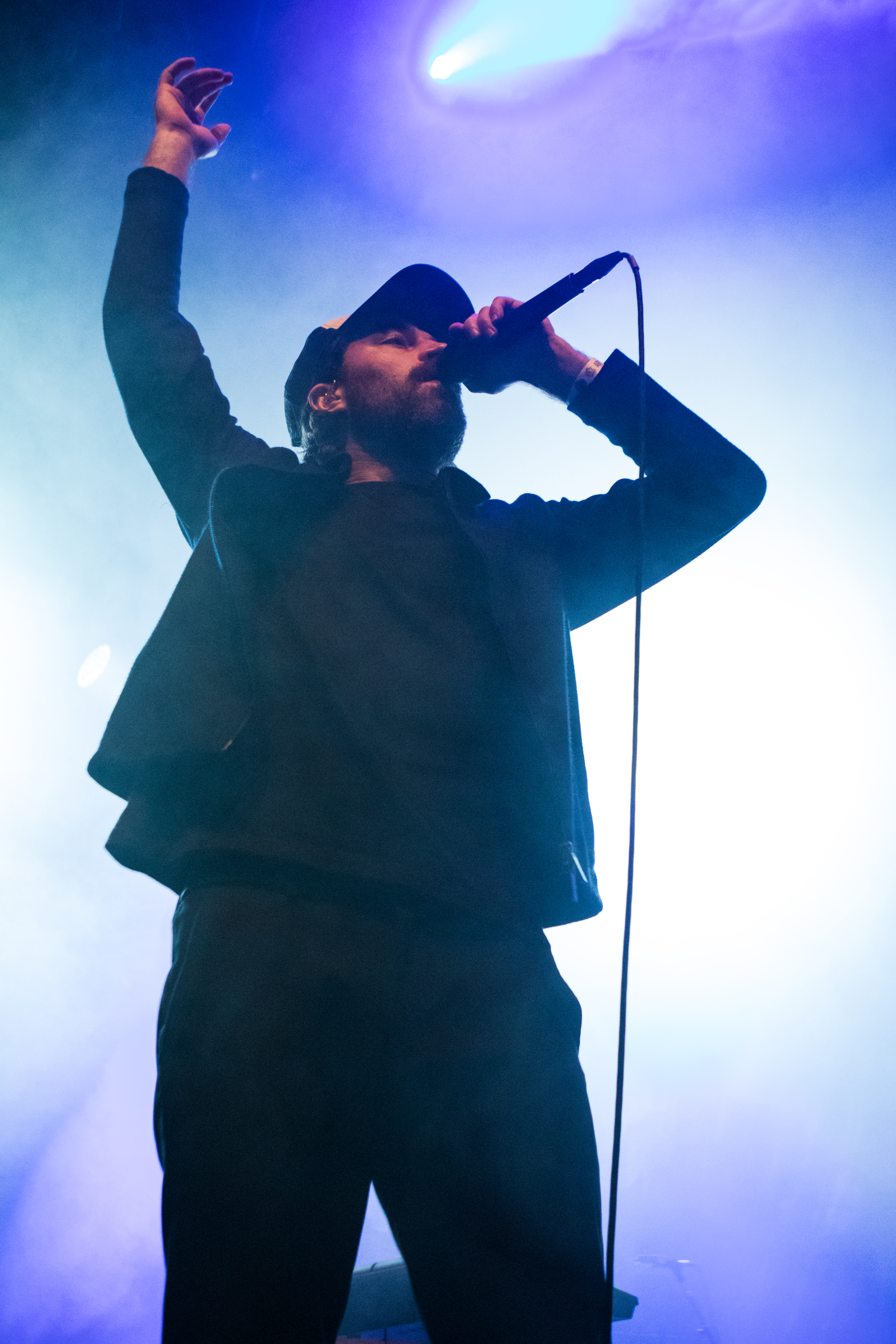
- J. Bernardt performing in 2017

Background information
- Born: 1 June 1987 (age 39); Belgium
- Genres: Pop rock; Indie pop
- Occupations: singer-songwriter; recording artist
- Instruments: vocals; guitar; keyboards
- Years active: 2016 - present
- Label: PIAS Recordings
- Member of: Balthazar
- Website: jbernardt.com

J. Bernardt is a side project of Belgian musician Jinte Deprez, which he launched in 2016 when his band Balthazar took a break. His debut album Running Days was released in 2017, and includes contributions from Adriaan Van De Velde on synths and drummer Klaas De Somer (Tourist LeMC). The album is a blend of different styles, including R&B, soul, hip hop, and electronica.

== Biography ==
Deprez has been musically active since his late teens. In 2004, he co-founded the pop/rock group Balthazar together with Maarten Devoldere and Patricia Vanneste. Deprez is one of the band's vocalists and guitarists, and he has produced several of their albums. To date, Balthazar has released five studio albums, one EP, and several singles.

== Discography ==
For Balthazar discography, see Balthazar

Studio albums

- Running Days (2017)
- Contigo (2024)
- Wild Swim (2026)

EPs

- Running Days (Remixes) (2017)
- Last Waltz (2024)

Singles

- "Calm Down" (2016)
- "Wicked Streets" (2017)
- "On Fire" (2017)
- "The Question" (2017)
- "The Other Man" (2017)
- "Four in the Morning" (2026)
