= Iman Ghaleb al-Hamli =

Yemeni entrepreneur

Iman Haddi Ghaleb al-Hamli (Arabic: إيمان غالب الهاملي; born c. 1986) is a Yemeni entrepreneur who helped establish solar microgrids in Yemen to provide clean energy for rural areas during the Yemeni Civil War.

== Career ==
Al-Hamli received support from the United Nations Development Programme to establish and run a microgrid in rural northern Yemen, one of three established in the country. Northern Yemen is one of the frontlines of the ongoing conflict between the Yemeni government and the Houthi movement which has left the country in a state of civil war since 2014, and much of the area otherwise lacks electricity. Al-Hamli's own microgrid has received attention for employing ten local women, an unusual feat in conservative Yemen where women are often shunned from the workforce. She did receive some criticism from local leaders for doing what was considered to be a man's work, though has since received praise for supplying an economic income for Yemeni families during the war, which has led to low job security. Al-Hamli has used some of the profits from the microgrid to grant small loans to local women to set up their own businesses, utilising electricity harnessed from the system.

In addition to her work with microgrids, al-Hamli is also an advocate for peace in Yemen and an end to the war so that Yemen can be rebuilt. In addition to rebuilding the country's infrastructure and economy, al-Hamli has also called on more investment to be given to agriculture, skills development among the Yemeni population, the establishment of an effective and inclusive government, and particularly the empowerment of women.

== Recognition ==
In 2020, al-Hamli was named as one of the BBC's 100 Women for that year for inspiring change in rural Yemen. In addition, El País called her "the most influential woman in Yemen; while Al Jazeera recognised al-Hamli as one of four women leading change in the Middle East.
