= FSP Festival =

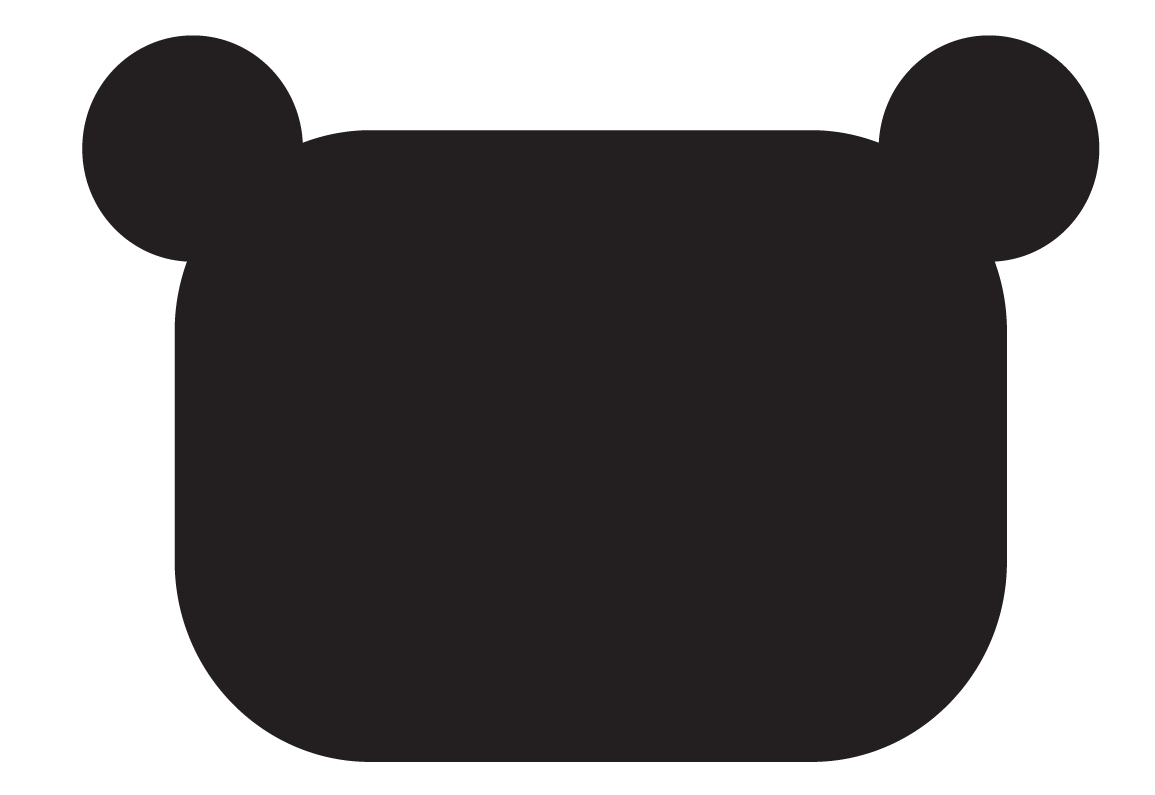
Traditional festival logo.

Freaky Summer Party Festival was an annual two-day music festival with street food, art installations and entertainment spots. The following platforms are represented at the festival: Edutainment, Kidsters, Jam Market, Food Court, Blogeria. Citizens of nearby countries and Europe visit the festival. More than 240 musicians from 20 countries have performed on the festival stage.

The organizer of the FSP Festival was advertising agency Pocket Rocket in Minsk.

== History ==
First FSP Festival was created as a local party for friends in 2008. From 2009 to 2012 FSP was held in the Rakovsky district close to the Islach river. The festival turned from a one-day art picnic into the two days festival with an afterparty. The last FSP took place in 2018, with the intention of returning in 2020.

== Headliners of the FSP Festival (2014-2016) ==
=== 2014 ===
Debruit, Cheese People, Jon Kennedy, Super Besse, 130 po vstrechnoi starenkoi Vespa, Zagortsev, Kraut, Craft, ODIS, Sasha Davydov, Fitzzgerald, Papa Bo Selektah, HMR, Remm, Andy Roc, Stereobeaver, Weedska, KorneJ.

=== 2015 ===
Tom Tukker, Markas Palubenka, Anton Maskeliade, Mustelide, CherryVata, Dj Gaamer, Groosha, Super DJ Besse, Stereobeaver, Winick, KorneJ, Stas, Kazantzev, Salut80, Morgotika, Plavsky, Davydov, Funkyjaws, Fitzgerald, East Soul Person, Pafnytii Kuzukian, Deech, Bogdanov, Push’n’Pull, Hutateli.

=== 2016 ===
ON-THE-GO, Mujuice, Ana Zhdanova, Balthazar, The Soul Surfers, DJ Fitzzgerald, DJ Andrew Zagortsev, DJ Papa Bo Selektah, Markas Palubenka, 1/2 Orchestra, Dj 50К, DJ Alein, DJ Alex Despotin, The Violent Youth, Intelligency, Delay Sound System: Kazantsev, Shumilin, Tea, Schmoltz, Stwone, Prokop Jnr & Klaxons Brass, Black Disco: Kraut, Plavsky, Davydov, Makushkin, Skvo’s, Unhuman Remainz, Bassota, I. F. U., DIG!, Push’n'Pull, Bonehider, Mechta: Plastik, Morgotika, Gaamer.
