= Warhaus (album) =

Studio album by Warhaus
- Released: 3 November 2017
- Length: 41:56
- Label: PIAS

Warhaus chronology
We fucked a flame into being (2016)	Warhaus (2017)	Ha Ha Heartbreak (2022)

Professional ratings
Aggregate scores
Source	Rating
Metacritic	70/100
Review scores
Source	Rating
The Line of Best Fit	7.5/10
Loud and Quiet	8/10

Warhaus is the second album by Balthazar lead vocalist and Belgian singer-songwriter Maarten Devoldere. It was released on 3 November 2017 through PIAS Recordings.

On this album, songs are sung by Devoldere and Sylvie Kreusch – by that time also his girlfriend. Track 9 "Kreusch" was titled after her.

== Track listing ==
No.	Title	Length
1.	"Mad World"	3:39
2.	"Love's a Stranger"	3:26
3.	"Well Well"	4:41
4.	"Control"	3:55
5.	"Dangerous"	5:37
6.	"Bang Bang"	4:16
7.	"Everybody"	4:43
8.	"No Such High"	3:05
9.	"Kreusch"	4:08
10.	"Fall in Love With Me"	4:26

== Charts ==
Chart	Peak position
Belgian Albums (Ultratop Flanders)	7
Belgian Albums (Ultratop Wallonia)	38
Dutch Albums (Album Top 100)	91
Swiss Albums (Schweizer Hitparade)	63
