= Sylvie Kreusch =

Belgian musician

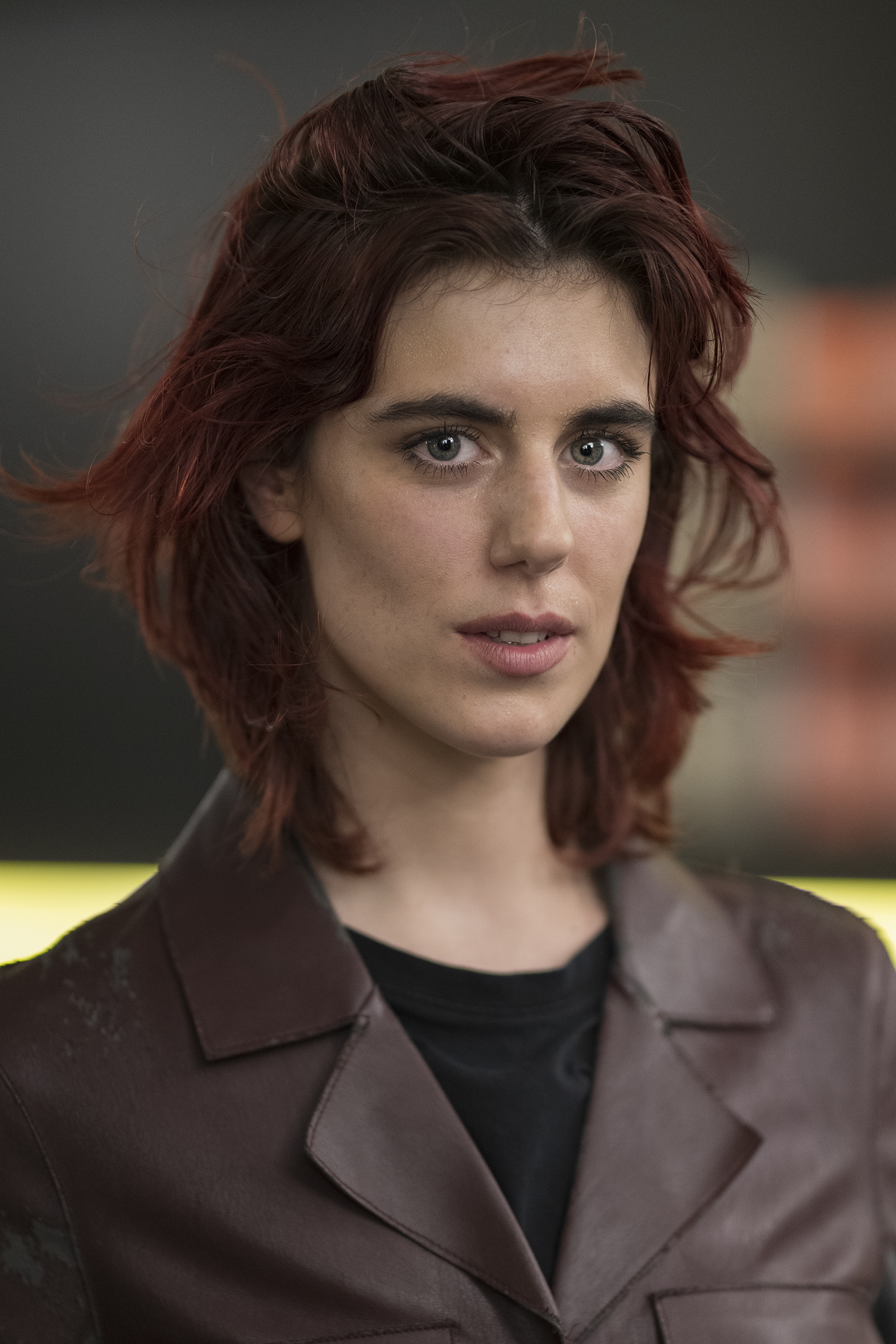
- Kreusch in 2021

Background information
- Born: 16 May 1991 (age 35)
- Origin: Antwerp, Belgium
- Years active: 2007–present

Sylvie Kreusch (born 16 May 1991) is a Belgian musician.

== Music and fashion career ==
In 2007, at the age of 16, together with her friends from school, Sylvie founded her first music band called "Soldier's Heart". They played together for many years, Sylvie left the band in 2016.

In 2016, Sylvie joined her by then boyfriend Maarten Devoldere, in his music band Warhaus. Together they recorded a Belgium Music Industry Award-winning act, Warhaus, whose debut record reached #1 on the national Albums Chart in 2016. Track 9 from this album was named after her: "Kreusch". As Warhaus, they performed numerous concerts, and played on music Festivals, the biggest being Poland-based international Opole Songwriters Festival. They were also invited to perform on a fashion show.

While performing with Warhaus, Kreusch participated in Ann Demeulemeester's Spring 2018 Paris Fashion Week show as a fashion model.

Later, pursuing her dream to become a solo artist, Sylvie continued her involvement in music for fashion context. The Unique opportunity was a carte blanche invitation she has received to prepare a music to animate Olivier Theyskens fashion collection for Paris Haute Couture Week 2018. "Seedy Tricks", the artistic video she has recorded - and the collection it presented - received an international applause and recognition. This was her solo artist debut. The video appears among the Azzaro Couture spots collections.

This followed by her work on the soundtrack for the Prada Spring/Summer 2018 campaign, and later also Victoria's Secret, BMW.

Sylvie also returned to the Opole Festival (international Opole Songwriters Festival) a year after performing there with Warhaus, now as a solo artist.

Her latest (2021) single solo, "Just a Touch Away" she has recorded (including the video) during COVID-19 pandemic isolation.

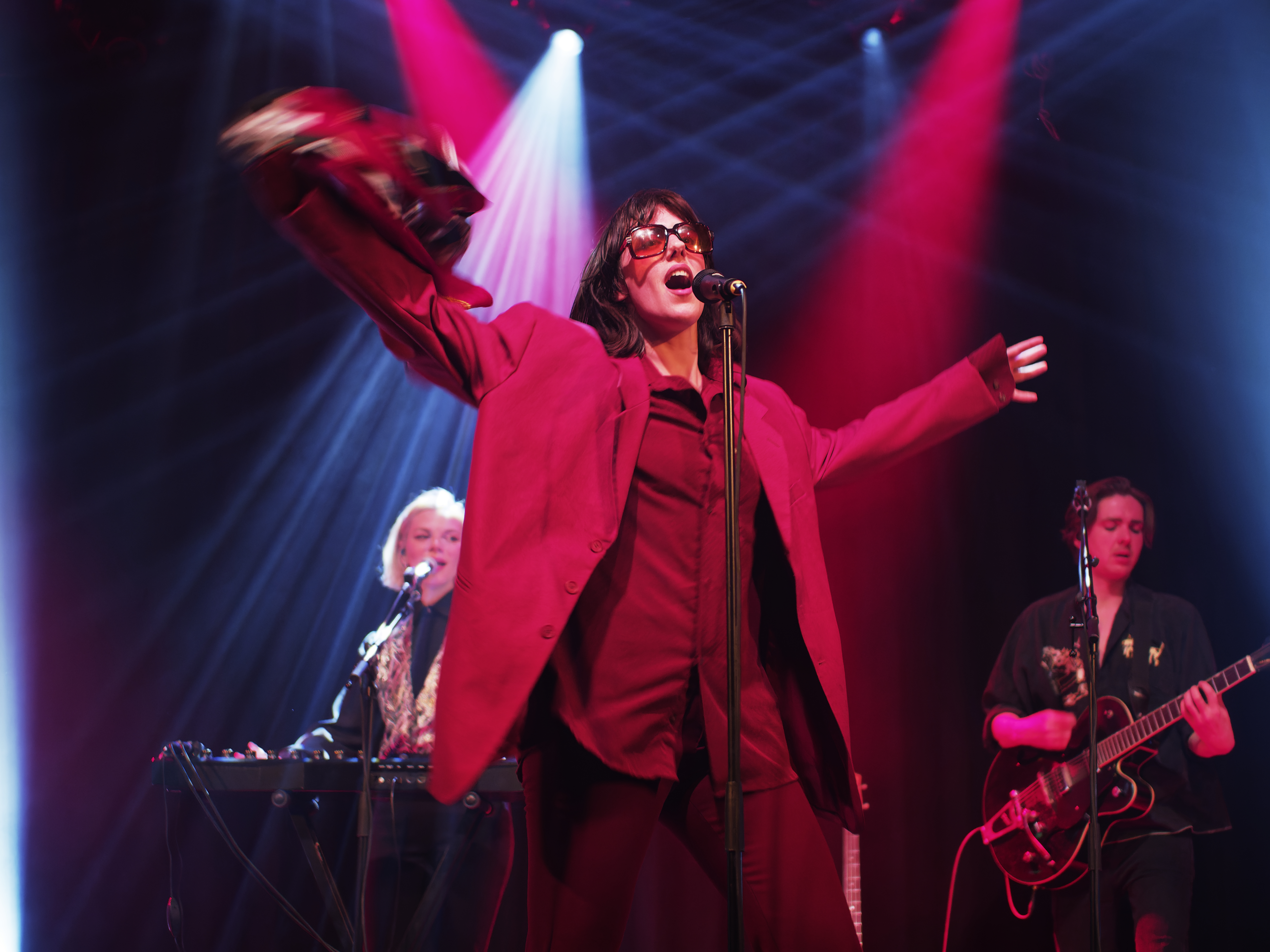
Kreusch performing in Utrecht, 2022

== Discography ==
Albums

- Montbray (2021)
- Comic Trip (2024)

EPs

- Bada Bing! Bada Boom! (2019)
- Wild Love (2020)

Singles

- "Seedy Tricks" (2018)
- "Please to Devon" (2019)
- "Just a Touch Away" (2021)

Collaborations

- "Warrior" – song on "Feuerwerk" single (2015)
- Warhaus with Maarten Devoldere (2017)

Soundtrack

- Her solo single "Seedy Tricks" with a video she arranged and performed served as video clip for Olivier Theyskens collection at the Paris Haute Couture Fashion Week 2018;
- Composed music for three Prada short films, music for Victoria's Secret, and BMW.

== Awards and recognition ==
In 2018, Sylvie Kreusch received the title of Red Bull Elektropedia Awards: Most Promising Artist 2018.
