= Mini-grid =

Small scale electricity distribution grid

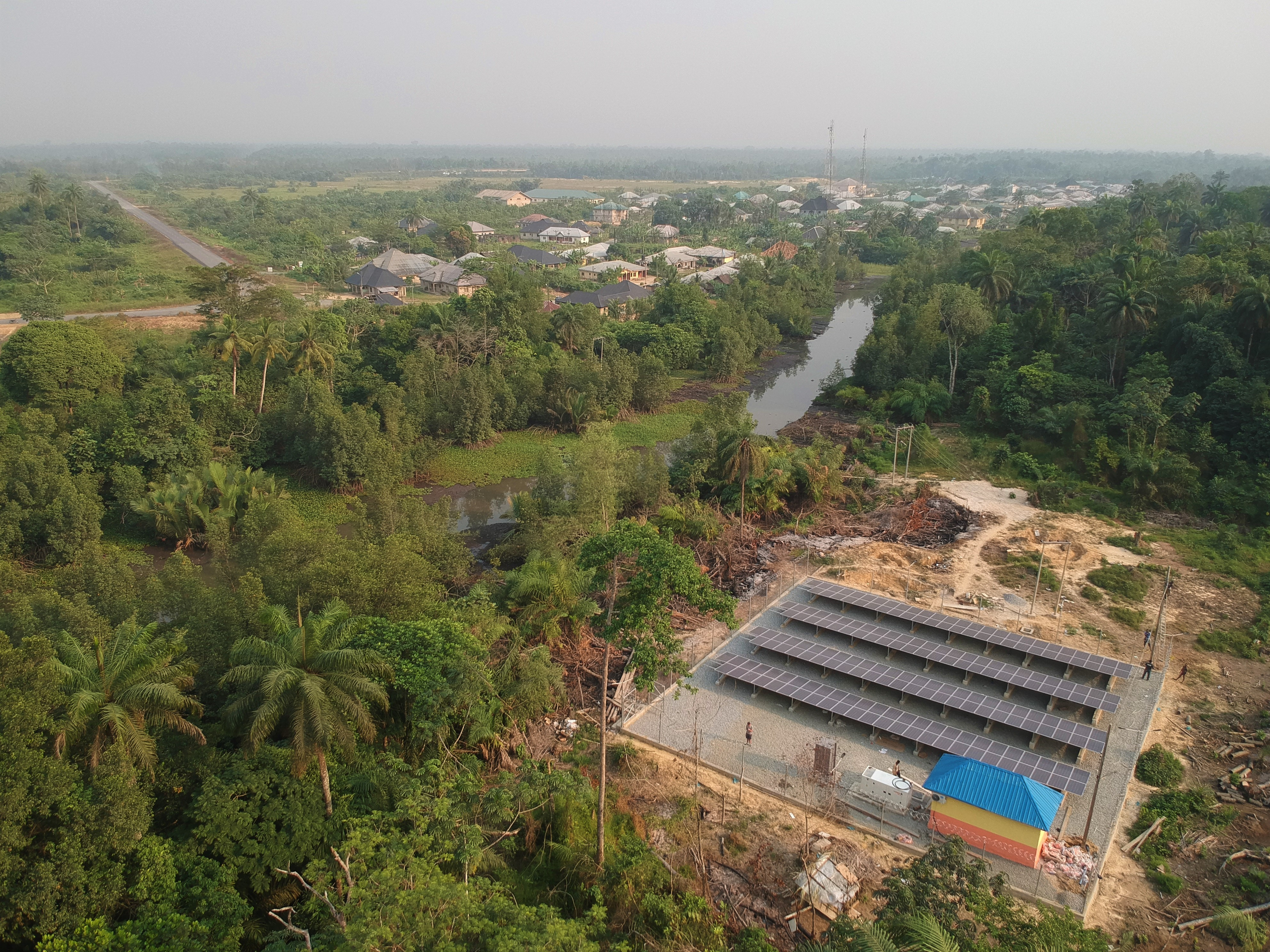
A solar mini-grid in Bayelsa, Nigeria operated by Renewvia

A mini-grid is an aggregation of electrical loads and one or more energy sources operating as a single system providing electricity and possibly heat, isolated from a main power grid. A modern mini-grid may include renewable- and fossil fuel-based power generation, energy storage, and load control. A mini grid can be fully isolated from the main grid (wide area synchronous grid) or interconnected to it. If it is interconnected to the main grid, it must also be able to isolate (“island”) from the main grid and continue to serve its customers while operating in an island or autonomous mode. Mini-grids are used as a cost-effective solution for electrifying rural communities where a grid connection is challenging in terms of transmission and cost for the end user population density, with mini-grids often used to electrify rural communities of a hundred or more households that are 10 km or more from the main grid.

Mini grids and microgrids are similar, and the terms are sometimes used as synonyms. Both microgrids and mini grids include generation and distribution, and generally include electricity storage in the form of electrochemical batteries. Both can “island” in the event of a blackout or other disturbance or – common in mini grids – in the case that they were never connected to the main grid in the first place. In practice, the term “mini grid” is used more in a context common in low- and middle-income countries providing electricity to communities that were previously unelectrified, or sometimes used to provide reliable electricity in areas in which the national grid is present but where electricity is sporadic. Across Sub-Saharan Africa, more than half of households connected to the main grid reported receiving electricity less than half of the time. The African Mini Grid Developers Association (AMDA) reports that uptimes of mini grids of its members for which data was available averaged 99% across countries. In contrast, the term “microgrid” is used more in higher income countries to refer to systems that provide very high levels of reliability (for example, “five nines” or 99.999%) for critical loads like data centers, hospitals, corporate campuses or military bases generally in service areas that already have high levels of reliability (e.g. “three nines” or 99.9% reliability) by global standards.

== Background ==
=== History ===
The electric grids of many developed, high-income countries once started out as mini-grids. These isolated electrical systems were then connected and integrated into a larger grid. This first generation of mini grids was pivotal to the early development and industrialization of most modern economies, including Brazil, China, Denmark, Italy, the Netherlands, Spain, Sweden, the United Kingdom, and the United States. Mini grid systems introduced in the late nineteenth and early twentieth centuries can be described as the first generation of mini grids. Starting in the 1980s and ramping up through the 1990s and early 2000s, a second generation of mini grids numbering in the tens of thousands was deployed in many low-income countries. These systems are typically small and isolated, powered by diesel or hydropower, and built by local communities or entrepreneurs primarily to provide rural households with access to electricity, especially in areas not yet served by the main grid. Many of these systems were overtaken by the national grids. Some that still exist are now prime candidates for hybridization with solar photovoltaic (PV) systems to reduce the fuel cost.

=== Contemporary mini grids ===
Over the past few years, a third generation of solar mini grids has emerged. These mini grids, mostly solar PV hybrids, are owned and operated by private companies that leverage transformative technologies and innovative strategies to build portfolios of mini grids instead of one-off projects. The typical third-generation mini grid is ready for interconnection with the main grid, uses batteries for storage, and employs remote management systems and prepay smart meters. This third-generation mini grid also incorporates energy-efficient appliances for productive uses of electricity into its business model. These mini grids operate in more favorable business environments, taking advantage of cost reductions in the latest mini grid component technologies and regulations developed specifically for private-sector investment.

=== Rural electrification ===
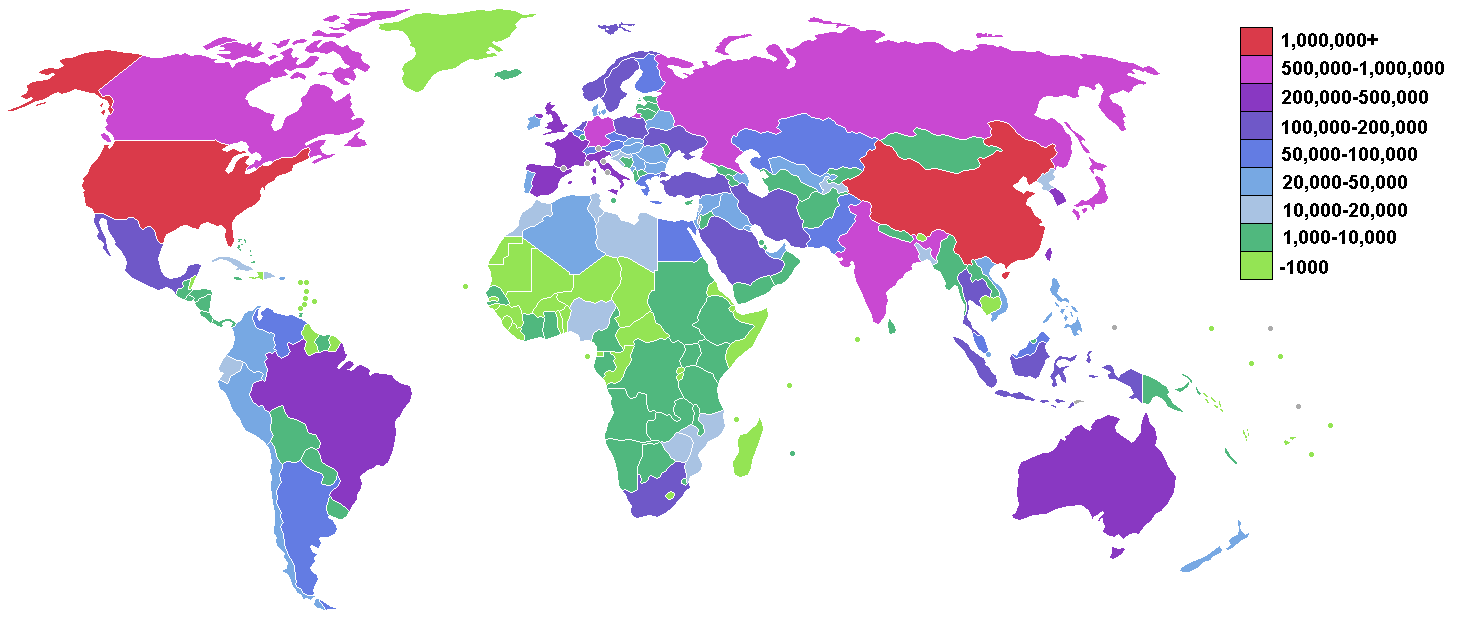
Electricity consumption per country in million kWh, from CIA Factbook, accessed April 2006

Many rural communities remain isolated from larger, traditional grids due to geographic and economic constraints. The electrification of the global off-grid rural population remains a major task of many developing and developed countries, and according to the International Energy Agency in the 2013 World Energy Outlook, mini-grids represent the most cost-effective way to provide universal electricity access to these populations. Due to new technology innovations that have resulted in declining costs both for mini-grids and energy generation sources, specifically solar and wind power, mini-grids have the potential to electrify remote areas that would otherwise remain outside of a grid connection. Mini-grids are a cost-effective and timely solution for more isolated areas in which connection to the main electric grid is unavailable, and represent a practical option for meeting the energy demand in Sub-Saharan Africa, South and East Asia, and Small Island Developing States.

Millions of people remain without access to electricity today, and the U.N. Sustainable Development Goals commit the global community to provide a solution. The map on the right demonstrates energy disparity between developed countries such as the US, China, and Europe while South America, Africa, and Southeast Asia still have many communities that lack reliable, sustainable, affordable energy. Mini-grids are currently being viewed as one of the most effective solutions to bringing energy to rural populations where the energy demands are such that individual stand-alone systems such as nano-grids are impractical but where the population is large enough to require a larger grid system. Because a grid must balance the supply of energy with the demand, the mini-grid's larger size and flexibility allows for safer and more affordable power.

== Technical components ==
=== Generation ===
With the rapid decline in the cost of solar photovoltaics, there is a strong and accelerating trend towards the use of solar electricity in mini grids. According to a 2022 study by the World Bank's ESMAP, approximately 51 percent of installed mini grids are solar or solar hybrid (generally solar + diesel), followed by those powered only by hydro (35%), fossil fuel (10%), and other generation technologies such as wind (5%). The trend is accelerating: more than 10 times as many solar mini grids were built per year from 2016 to 2020 than fossil fuel mini grids. Almost 99 percent of all planned mini grids are solar or solar hybrid. Solar hybrid mini grids include one or more other sources of electricity generation, typically a diesel generator or sometimes a generator powered by biomass fuel to a provide a dispatchable source of electricity in the event of extended cloudily periods. Most solar mini grids are hybridized with a diesel generator that provides backup power in the event of extended cloudy periods. The diesel generator typically generates less than 10% of the energy consumed by mini grid customers on an annual basis. In areas where agricultural residues such as rice husk or animal manure are plentiful, biomass or biogas generators can take the place of diesel backup generation.

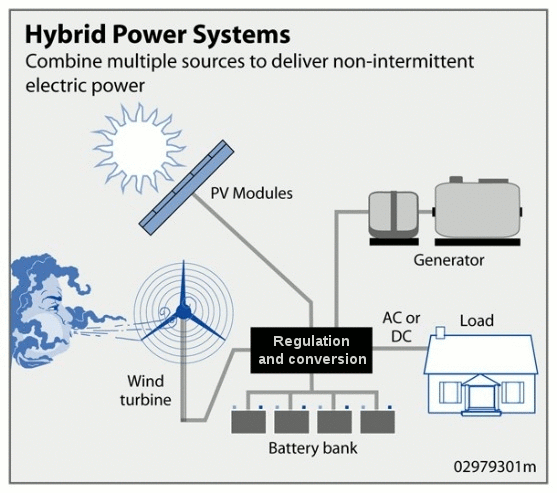
Hybrid power system combining wind, solar PV, and conventional diesel generation with energy storage.

Where suitable sites allow, small scale hydroelectricity (micro- or mini-hydropower) provide cost-effective 24-hour a day electricity generation. In areas where windspeeds are consistently high and/or sunlight is very restricted seasonally, wind is used to power mini grids, often in a hybrid configuration with solar or diesel or both.

A vital component of a mini-grid electric system is on-site, reliable source of energy generation. Traditional mini-grid generation for remote areas came from diesel engine alternators, which incurred high running costs, low efficiency and high maintenance. To obtain the reliability of a fossil fuel powered grid with greater sustainability, hybrid energy systems can be used to integrate renewable energy technologies with diesel generators, batteries, and inverters. The main concern with generation is the fluctuation in load demand that imposes varied power requirements from the generation system. These fluctuations can vary throughout a single day, from day to day, or even on the scale of weeks to months, which necessitates flexible mini-grid generation. In the case of limited power generation without a source of energy storage, peak loads can demand more power than the mini-grid generation is capable of supplying, which results in brownouts or blackouts.

=== Energy storage ===
In renewable energy mini-grids, storage plays a crucial role by balancing the intermittency of sources like solar and wind, ensuring a consistent and reliable supply of electricity, especially during periods when generation is low or demand is high. Electricity in third generation mini grids is stored in electrochemical batteries. Prior to 2018, most mini grids were installed with lead acid batteries, however the rapid cost decline and superior lifetimes and performance of lithium-ion batteries has led to most new mini grids using lithium-ion batteries. In a World Bank ESMAP survey of 211 mini grids under commissioned in 2020 and 2021, 69% used Li-ion batteries and 31% used lead-acid batteries.

=== Power conversion and management ===
In most mini grids, inverters convert the direct current (DC) electricity stored in batteries and produced by solar panels into alternating current (AC) power that powers appliances used in households and businesses.

In some particularly small communities with low loads, DC mesh mini grids are used. Mesh grids—or “skinny grids”—distribute DC electricity for lighting, electronics, and small appliances like fans and even efficient refrigerators or electric rickshaws. They take the form of clusters of solar home systems made up of solar panels affixed to customers' premises and connected in a mesh network. Specialized controllers allow surpluses to be shared and households can upgrade to AC appliances by purchasing an inverter.

Energy management systems (EMS) optimize the balance between dispatching the diesel generator and drawing on energy storage, taking into account expected load and near future opportunities for solar charging. Many mini grids, even in remote areas, have cell-phone carrier based remote monitoring capabilities that monitor power production and consumption, battery state-of-charge, and voltage levels and upload information to the internet several times per hour. Remote monitoring can help operators to identify and address small problems early before they cascade and become larger problems.

=== Distribution ===
A mini-grid distribution system carries the energy produced by the generation source to the end users. It consists of poles and low voltage (<1000 V) distribution wires as well as protection equipment necessary to enable safe and effective energy distribution. If a feeder in the distribution system is longer than roughly 1 km in distance, then it is generally necessary to use transformers to step up the electricity to medium voltage (35 kV or below) to reduce ohmic losses. Depending on the load requirements, a distribution system can be in AC single or three phase power or DC.

If there is the prospect that the main grid may someday arrive, the mini grid distribution network is often built to utility standards so that the distribution network can be easily integrated into the national grid. If the mini grid is certain to remain disconnected from the main grid (for example, if it is located on an island distant from shore) distribution networks are sometimes built to standards that are lower than the national grid, but still ensure safety and efficiency.

Tata Power Renewable Microgrid household switchboard, eliminating the need for extensive household wiring

Electricity is sold to customers using either pre-pay or postpay meters. Pre-pay meters are more common and work like pre-paid phone plans, automatically disconnecting customes when the amount of purchased electricity is consumed. Because electricity consumed during sunny hours is less costly to produce than electricity that must be stored in batteries or generated from a diesel generator, mini grids metering systems sometimes provide lower tariffs for daytime consumption, or the ability to curtail lower-priority customers in the event of energy shortages.

The use of a pre-made switchboard (sometimes referred to as a ready-board) with a few light switches and outlets can eliminate the costs of internal household wiring.

== Benefits ==
There are many potential benefits of mini-grids ranging from technical and environmental to social and financial advantages. Mini-grids can be used in rural areas and are often more efficient and cost-effective than other types of power systems. They can also strengthen the community while having less impact on the environment.

=== Technical benefits ===
The technology used in mini-grids provides various benefits. Mini-grids are relatively quick and easy to implement in areas without electricity. They can also be used to improve existing electrical grids that are ineffective or unreliable by providing additional power or by replacing them completely. Mini-grids are also more efficient because they can provide a low load at night when less electricity is needed. Unlike conventional energy generation, mini-grids reduce the energy lost at night time when less energy is required by the community. Larger electrical systems such as diesel generators cannot offer this because they are inefficient at low loads and most often continue operating at higher loads regardless of the amount of electricity needed. The use of mini-grids also decreases the amount of time the generators are run at low loads thereby increasing efficiency of the entire system.

An additional benefit mini-grids provide is that they do no require a traditional fuel source as many larger scale electric grids do. This means they can be easily implemented in areas without access to diesel or other fossil fuels. This reduces operating costs and reliance on often fluctuating fuel prices. Mini-grids also require less maintenance than larger electrical grids. Since they reduce the hours that diesel generators are used at low loads, generators last longer and do not need to be replaced as often. Because of the rural areas where mini-grids are typically used, there is often little access to supplies or technicians if system maintenance is needed.

=== Financial benefits ===
Mini-grids can provide significant financial benefits in rural electrification efforts in developing countries. First, deployment of mini-grids in rural unelectrified areas circumvents the high costs and logistical challenges associated with extending national grid infrastructure to these regions. This not only makes electrification more financially feasible but also accelerates the pace of rural electrification, contributing to broader economic development goals. Second, the use of renewable energy sources like solar can lower the levelized cost of electricity while reducing dependency on fossil fuels and fluctuating global energy prices. Third, by providing reliable electricity, mini-grids stimulate economic growth in rural areas, fostering small businesses and industries, which in turn can increase local income levels. For instance, a study on solar mini-grids in Kenya and Nigeria showed a significant increase in productivity and economic activity. The median income of rural Kenyan community members quadrupled, and business establishments reported an increase in operational hours, expansion in products and services, and hiring more employees. Additionally, mini-grids led to a shift from hazardous energy sources like kerosene lamps to safer, more reliable electricity, further enhancing economic stability and health in these communities. Mini-grids are also able to spread electrical storage and generation across many users which can reduce the cost when compared to solar home systems where surpluses or generation or storage cannot be shared with neighboring houses.

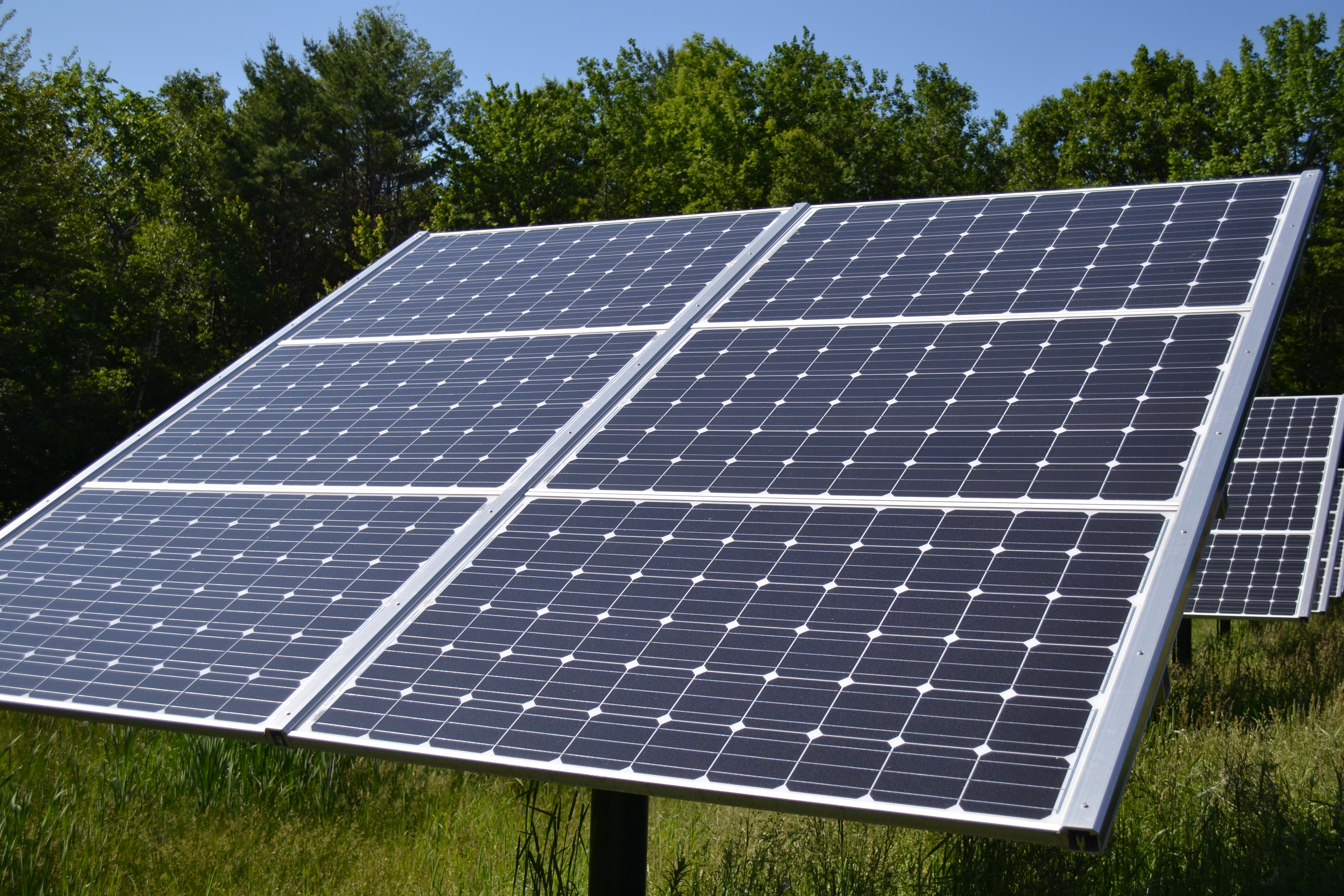
Solar panels are often used in mini-grids to reduce the need for diesel generators.

=== Environmental benefits ===
Mini-grids are much more environmentally friendly than other types of grids. Since they reduce the need for diesel generators, greenhouse gas emissions are greatly reduced. This also improves air and noise pollution in the areas mini-grids are used. The World Bank estimates that a rollout at scale of 217,000 mini grids to serve half a billion people by 2030 would avoid 1.2 billion tonnes of CO_{2} emissions. The UNFCCC estimates that every megawatt-hour of electricity delivered to customers of mini-grids saves between 0.8 and 2.72 tons of carbon dioxide equivalent from being released into the atmosphere.

=== Social benefits ===
In addition to their technical and economic advantages, mini-grids also benefit the people and communities they serve. For many businesses and organizations to function, they must have working and efficient electricity. Mini-grids provide the necessary services for businesses to succeed in developing areas. This leads to the creation of more jobs and an increase in income for the community. Improved electricity can also benefit healthcare technology and institutions in the areas and lead to a higher standard of living. For example, a study in Kenya and Nigeria showed that local health clinics connected to mini-grids reported significant improvements in service delivery, including enhanced refrigeration for vaccines and medicines and the ability to treat more patients with extended operational hours. This not only improved healthcare access but also reduced reliance on hazardous energy sources like kerosene lamps, which pose health risks. The introduction of mini-grids also positively impacted education, with increased school enrollment and improved academic performance due to extended study hours enabled by reliable lighting.

Furthermore, the electricity mini-grids provide allows for more opportunities for social gatherings and events, which strengthen the community. Improved electricity also creates the opportunity to construct more buildings and expand the community. Additionally, mini-grids have been shown to reduce the time spent on household chores such as collecting water and cooking fuel, which disproportionately benefits women and girls by freeing up time for education and other productive activities. This shift contributes to greater gender equality and empowers women with more opportunities for economic participation and decision-making in their communities.

== Risks ==
Although mini-grids have many benefits, there are also some drawbacks. There are some risks associated with their technology and organization as well as risks to the community they are implemented in.

=== Technical risks ===
One of the main technical risks associated with mini-grids is the load uncertainty. It is often difficult to estimate the load size, growth, and schedule which can lead to the system running with lower efficiency and higher cost. It is also difficult to support loads that are constantly changing over time, as they typically are when using mini-grids. There is also a risk to power quality when using mini-grids. Integrating photovoltaic devices and batteries can be disruptive to the existing grid and can cause it to become unstable. Another technical drawback of using mini-grids is that failure of hardware in one part of the grid could affect the entire system. If one section if the grid is damaged, the rest of the grid could fail as well. This is a risk that exists with any type of grid, however the regions where mini-grids are typically used are poor rural areas with less access to maintenance services so the effects are exacerbated. While helpful for energy storage, the batteries used in mini-grids also have risks of their own. They are usually expensive and as they age they have a large influence on the energy that is supplied to the grid. If the batteries are not replaced at the correct time, the energy provided by the whole grid could be decreased.

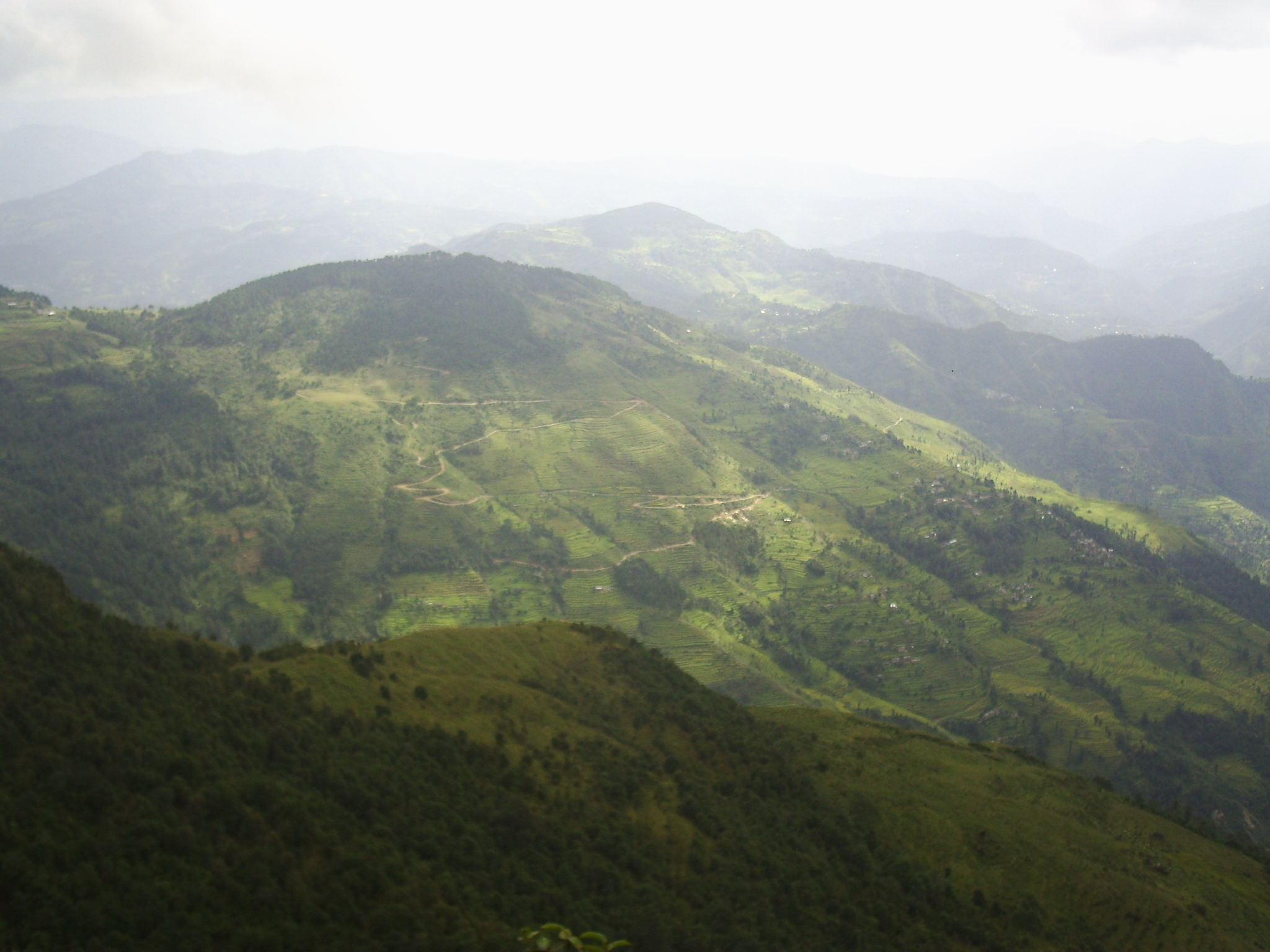
Most areas where mini-grids are used are rural and have little access to supplies.

=== Organizational risks ===
Because of their complex nature, there are a few organizational risks associated with using mini-grids. In order to be effective, mini-grids must have effective business models to support their operations. There needs to be a steady flow of revenue to keep the business up and running and in order to keep providing customers with electricity. Due to the remote and underdeveloped locations where mini-grids are typically implemented, it is difficult to transport supplies and skilled personnel to the areas they are needed. It is especially difficult when installing the system and when repairs are needed.

=== Social risks ===
Implementing a mini-grid into a community takes meticulous planning and cooperation between the people living in the area as well as the technicians installing the devices. There also needs to be communication among the community with regards to allotted energy quotas. Each user is typically assigned an energy quota to be used over a certain amount of time. If some users over-consume the electricity, this leaves a deficit for the other users and could disrupt the entire system. The community must work in cooperation in order for the mini-grid to work successfully.

== Economics ==
Mini-grids provide communities with a reliable source of energy as well as many benefits to their economy. It is often too expensive for government electrical companies to attempt to bring electricity to undeveloped areas, and there is less potential for profit in these areas with poor economies. Since mini-grids can operate separately from the larger national grids, private companies can implement them and provide rural communities with electricity more quickly than state-owned companies.

Mini-grid tariff structures present a fundamental economic challenge between ensuring affordable electricity access and attracting necessary private investment for rural electrification. Analysis from sub-Saharan Africa reveals that cost-reflective tariffs for mini-grids typically range from $0.70-0.86 per kWh for hybrid solar-battery-diesel systems, significantly higher than subsidized national utility rates that often fall below $0.10 per kWh. This creates a substantial revenue gap requiring either large government subsidies (potentially $0.40-0.80 per kWh) or regulatory frameworks that allow higher tariffs to ensure commercial viability. Countries have adopted varying approaches along this spectrum: some mandate uniform national tariffs with extensive subsidies, while others like Tanzania implement tiered regulatory frameworks that exempt small systems (<100 kW) from tariff approval, allowing cost-reflective pricing. Cross-subsidization schemes, where commercial customers or high-usage consumers subsidize basic residential access, offer a middle path that can balance equity concerns with investment attractiveness. The economic sustainability of mini-grid deployment ultimately depends on finding an appropriate balance between tariff levels that customers can afford, rates that attract private capital, and subsidy mechanisms that governments can sustain while achieving rural electrification goals.

In 2019, the global mini-grid market consisted of over 26,000 installed and planned systems across 130+ countries, with capital costs averaging $3,900/kW for solar-hybrid systems and levelized costs of electricity (LCOE) ranging from $0.55-0.85/kWh. The economics are improving due to declining component costs (solar panels, batteries, and inverters have dropped 62-85% since 2010) and increased load factors from productive uses of electricity, with projections showing LCOE could fall to $0.22/kWh by 2030. The sector shows significant profit potential, with ESMAP estimating $4.7 billion in annual profit potential across the value chain by 2030, though achieving universal electricity access through mini-grids would require connecting 490 million people via 210,000+ systems at an investment cost of approximately $220 billion, representing a massive scale-up from current deployment rates that necessitates continued cost reductions, improved financing mechanisms, and supportive regulatory frameworks.

=== Role in achieving SDG7 and market outlook by 2030 ===
The UN's Sustainable Development Goal #7 is ensuring access to affordable, reliable, sustainable and modern energy for all by 2030. As of 2022, mini grids provide electricity to about 48 million people worldwide. Mini grids that are currently being planned are expected to bring electricity to an additional 35 million people, mostly in Sub-Saharan Africa. To reach universal electricity access by 2030, 490 million people will be served at least cost by 217,000 mini grids requiring an investment of $127 billion. With increasing economies of scale, decreasing costs of major components such as solar panels and batteries, and increasing load factor through greater daytime use of electricity, the World Bank projects that the cost of electricity from mini grids can decrease from an unsubsidized levelized cost of electricity from best-in-class hybrid solar mini grids today of $0.38 per kWh to about $0.20 per kWh by 2030. Mini grid developer Husk Power projects a similar decrease in LCOE is possible, reducing to $0.20 per kWh by 2030 if the mini grid industry is able to adopt of sustainable business models at site and portfolio levels with cost, quality of service and demand shaping projects rollout.

== Roadmaps for scaling up mini grids ==
Scaling up mini grids will require significant work in multiple areas. The World Bank has identified ten: 1) reducing costs and optimizing design & innovation for solar mini grids; (2) planning national strategies and developer portfolios with geospatial analysis and digital platforms; (3) transforming productive livelihoods and improving business viability; (4) engaging communities as valued customers; (5) delivering services through local and international companies and utilities; (6) financing solar mini grid portfolios and end user appliances; (7) attracting exceptional talent and scaling skills development; (8) supporting institutions, delivery models, and champions that create opportunities; (9) enacting regulations and policies that empower mini grid companies and customers; and (10) cutting red tape for a dynamic business environment.

=== Case study ===
A case study performed in the Leh District of India demonstrates the effects of mini-grids on the economy. Since the operational costs of mini-grids are less than those of diesel and hydro generators, the companies that run them are able to bring in more revenue. This increase in revenue means the companies can increase the salaries of their workers. In turn, the workers are able to spend more in the local businesses and the economy is allowed to grow. Furthermore, mini-grids provide opportunities for the local economy to grow and improve. Businesses can provide more and better services with improved electricity and expand their organizations.
