= Microgrid clustering =

Connecting and controlling multiple microgrids

Microgrid clustering is connecting and controlling multiple microgrids within a certain range of distance (e.g. neighborhood) to either gain economic benefits when the microgrids are connected to the grid in normal operation (e.g. exchange power with lower prices instead of the grid price) or to mitigate power outage during blackout by maintaining supplying the critical loads. The connection between the microgrids in the cluster should be set up in a specific way according to a predefined algorithm and the existing conditions of the system (i.e. demand and generation).
