= International Electrotechnical Commission =

International standards organization

- Commission électrotechnique internationale
- Abbreviation: IEC
- Formation: 26 June 1906, 120 years old
- Type: Standards organization
- Legal status: Swiss association
- Purpose: Standardization for electrical technology, electronics and related fields
- Headquarters: Geneva, Switzerland
- Locations: List: Geneva, Switzerland; Sydney, Australia; São Paulo, Brazil; Nairobi, Kenya; Singapore; Worcester, Massachusetts, United States
- Members: 92 countries: Albania; Algeria; Argentina; Australia; Austria; Azerbaijan; Bahrain; Bangladesh; Belarus; Belgium; Bosnia and Herzegovina; Brazil; Bulgaria; Burkina Faso; Cambodia; Canada; Colombia; Chile; China; Croatia; Cyprus; Czech Republic; Denmark; Egypt; Estonia; Ethiopia; Finland; France; Georgia; Germany; Ghana; Greece; Hungary; Iceland; India; Indonesia; Iran; Iraq; Ireland; Israel; Italy; Ivory Coast; Japan; Jordan; Kazakhstan; Kenya; Kuwait; Latvia; Lithuania; Luxembourg; Malta; Malaysia; Mexico; Moldova; Montenegro; Morocco; Netherlands; Nigeria; New Zealand; North Macedonia; Norway; Oman; Pakistan; Peru; Philippines; Poland; Portugal; Qatar; Romania; Russia; Saudi Arabia; Serbia; Singapore; Slovakia; Slovenia; South Korea; South Africa; Spain; Sri Lanka; Sweden; Switzerland; Thailand; Tunisia; Turkey; Uganda; Ukraine; United Arab Emirates; United Kingdom; United States; Uruguay; Uzbekistan; Vietnam
- Official languages: English, French
- President: Jim Matthews
- Secretary General: Philippe Metzger
- Website: www.iec.ch

The International Electrotechnical Commission (IEC; French: Commission électrotechnique internationale) is an international standards organization that prepares and publishes international standards for all electrical, electronic and related technologies. IEC standards cover a vast range of technologies from power generation, transmission and distribution to home appliances and office equipment, semiconductors, fibre optics, batteries, solar energy, nanotechnology, and marine energy, as well as many others. The IEC also manages four worldwide conformity assessment systems that represent the only globally standardized approach to testing, inspection and certification.

All electrotechnologies are covered by IEC standards, including energy production and distribution, electronics, magnetics and electromagnetics, electroacoustics, multimedia, telecommunications and medical technology, as well as associated general disciplines such as terminology and symbols, electromagnetic compatibility, measurement and performance, dependability, design and development, safety and the environment.

== History ==
The first International Electrical Congress took place in 1881 at the International Exposition of Electricity, held in Paris. At that time the International System of Electrical and Magnetic Units was agreed to.

The International Electrotechnical Commission held its inaugural meeting on 26 June 1906, following discussions among the British Institution of Electrical Engineers, the American Institute of Electrical Engineers, and others, which began at the 1900 Paris International Electrical Congress, with British engineer R. E. B. Crompton playing a key role. In 1906, Lord Kelvin was elected as the first President of the International Electrotechnical Commission.

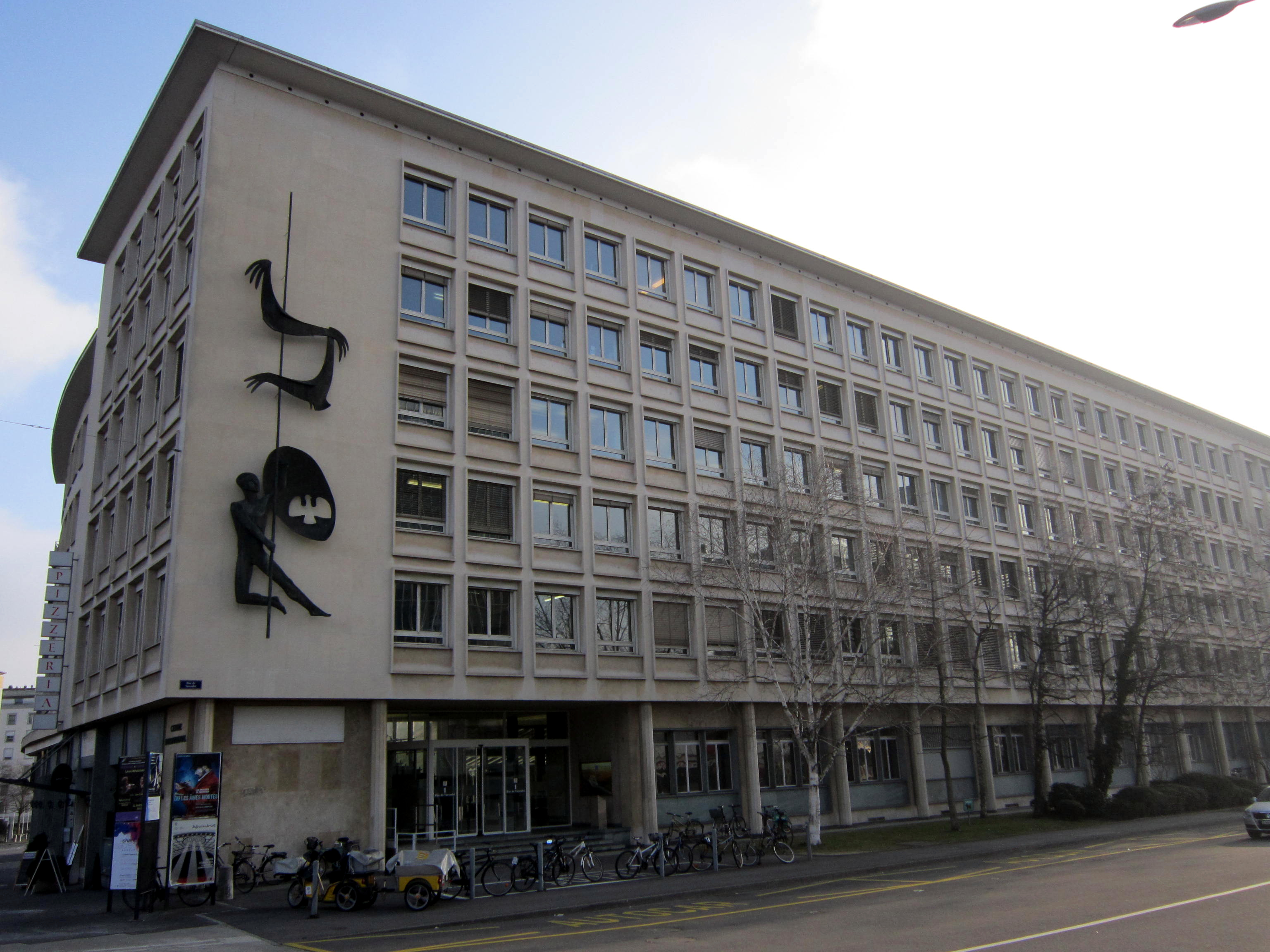
IEC central office in Geneva

The IEC was instrumental in developing and distributing standards for units of measurement, particularly the gauss, hertz, and weber. It was also first to promote the Giorgi System of standards, later developed into the SI, or Système International d'unités (in English, the International System of Units).

In 1938, it published a multilingual international vocabulary to unify terminology relating to electrical, electronic and related technologies. This effort continues, and the International Electrotechnical Vocabulary is published online as the Electropedia.

The CISPR (Comité International Spécial des Perturbations Radioélectriques) – in English, the International Special Committee on Radio Interference – is one of the groups founded by the IEC.

Currently, 92 countries are IEC members, while another 75 participate in the Affiliate Country Programme, which is not a form of membership but is designed to help industrializing countries get involved with the IEC. Originally located in London, United Kingdom, the IEC moved to its current headquarters in Geneva, Switzerland in 1948. There are regional centres covering Africa (Nairobi, Kenya), Asia (Singapore), Oceania (Sydney, Australia), Latin America (São Paulo, Brazil) and North America (Worcester, Massachusetts, United States).

The work is done by some 10,000 electrical and electronics experts from industry, government, academia, test labs and others with an interest in the subject.

IEC standards are often adopted as national standards by members states.

== IEC standards ==
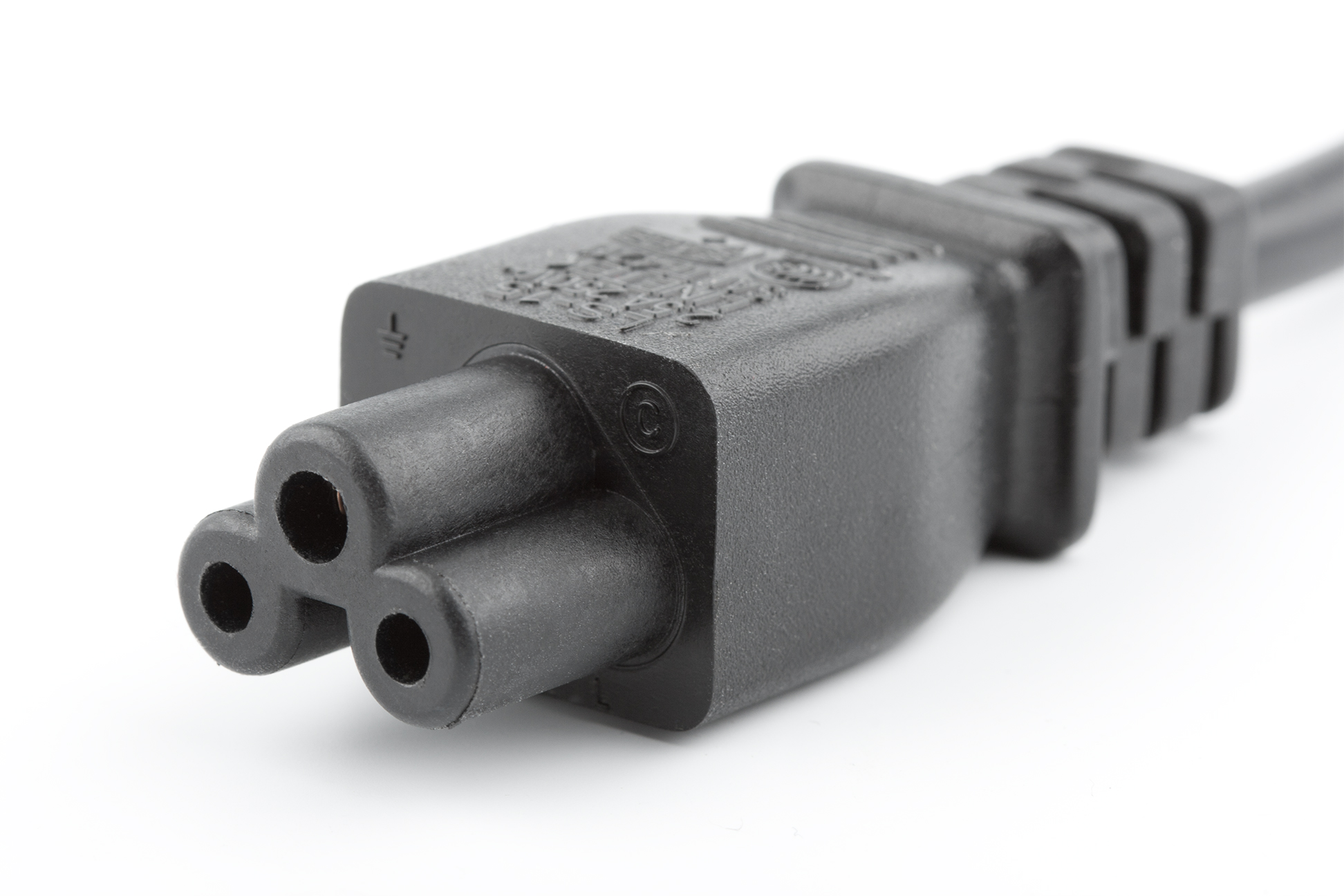
IEC 60320 C5 connector

The IEC cooperates closely with the International Organization for Standardization (ISO) and the International Telecommunication Union (ITU). In addition, it works with several major standards development organizations, including the IEEE with which it signed a cooperation agreement in 2002, which was amended in 2008 to include joint development work.

IEC standards that are not jointly developed with ISO have numbers in the range 60000–79999 and their titles take a form such as IEC 60417: Graphical symbols for use on equipment. Following the Dresden Agreement with CENELEC the numbers of older IEC standards were converted in 1997 by adding 60000, for example IEC 27 became IEC 60027. Standards of the 60000 series are also found preceded by EN to indicate that the IEC standard is also adopted by CENELEC as a European standard; for example IEC 60034 is also available as EN 60034.

Standards developed jointly with ISO, such as ISO/IEC 26300 (Open Document Format for Office Applications (OpenDocument) v1.0), ISO/IEC 27001 (Information technology, Security techniques, Information security management systems, Requirements) and ISO/IEC 17000 series, carry the acronyms of both organizations. The use of the ISO/IEC prefix covers publications from ISO/IEC Joint Technical Committee 1 – Information Technology, as well as conformity assessment standards developed by ISO CASCO (Committee on conformity assessment) and IEC CAB (Conformity Assessment Board). Other standards developed in cooperation between IEC and ISO are assigned numbers in the 80000 series, such as IEC 82045–1.

IEC standards are also being adopted by other certifying bodies such as BSI (United Kingdom), CSA (Canada), UL and ANSI/INCITS (United States), SABS (South Africa), Standards Australia, SPC/GB (China) and DIN (Germany). IEC standards adopted by other certifying bodies may have some noted differences from the original IEC standard.

== Membership and participation ==
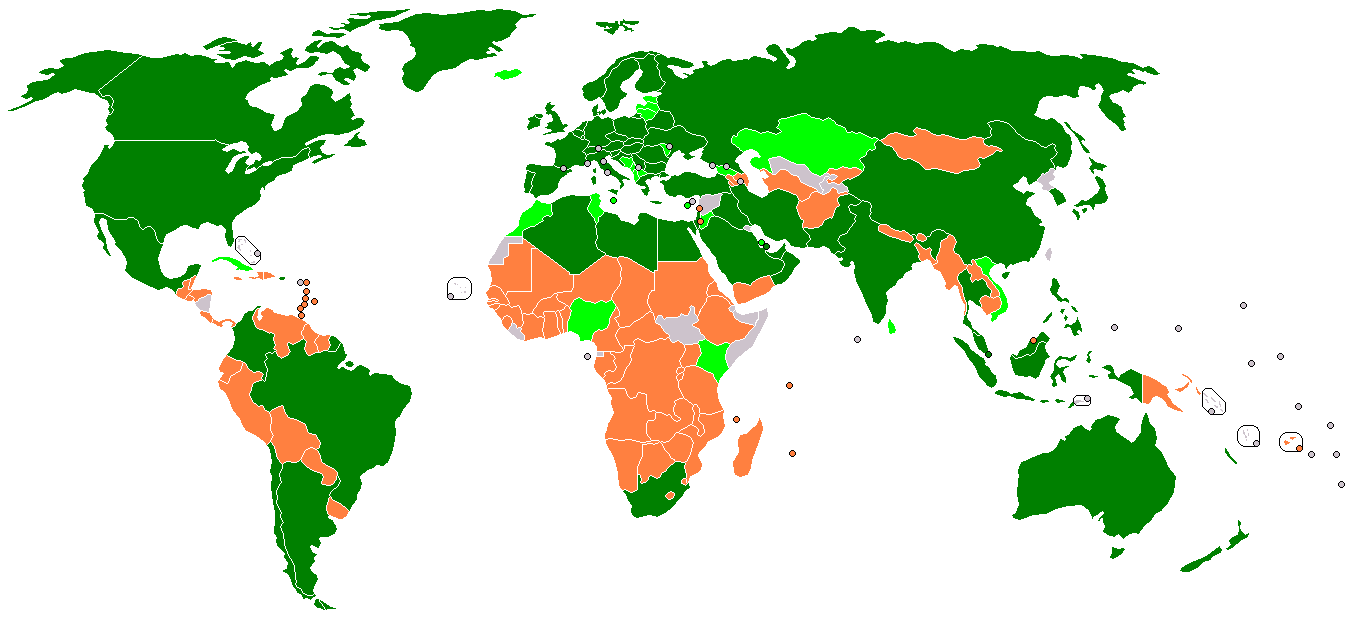
A map of IEC membership as of April 2012: Full members Associate members Affiliates

The IEC is made up of members, called national committees (NCs), with only one NC for each member. Each NC represents its nation's electrotechnical interests in the IEC. This includes manufacturers, providers, distributors and vendors, consumers and users, all levels of governmental agencies, professional societies and trade associations as well as standards developers from national standards bodies. National committees are constituted in different ways. Some NCs are public sector only, some are a combination of public and private sector, and some are private sector only. About 90% of those who prepare IEC standards work in industry. IEC Member countries include:

=== Full members ===
- Algeria
- Argentina
- Australia
- Austria
- Belarus
- Belgium
- Brazil
- Bulgaria
- Canada
- Colombia
- Chile
- China
- Croatia
- Czech Republic
- Denmark
- Egypt
- Finland
- France
- Germany
- Greece
- Hungary
- India
- Indonesia
- Iran
- Iraq
- Ireland
- Israel
- Italy
- Japan
- Kuwait
- Libya
- Luxembourg
- Malaysia
- Mexico
- Netherlands
- New Zealand
- Nigeria
- Norway
- Oman
- Pakistan
- Peru
- Philippines
- Poland
- Portugal
- Qatar
- Romania
- Russia
- Saudi Arabia
- Serbia
- Singapore
- Slovakia
- Slovenia
- South Africa
- South Korea
- Spain
- Sweden
- Switzerland
- Thailand
- Turkey
- Ukraine
- United Arab Emirates
- United Kingdom
- United States
- Nepal

=== Associate members (limited voting and managerial rights) ===
- Albania
- Bahrain
- Bangladesh
- Bosnia and Herzegovina
- Cambodia
- Cuba
- Cyprus
- Estonia
- Ethiopia
- Georgia
- Ghana
- Iceland
- Jordan
- Kazakhstan
- Kenya
- Latvia
- Lithuania
- North Macedonia
- Malta
- Moldova
- Montenegro
- Morocco
- North Korea
- Sri Lanka
- Tunisia
- Vietnam
- Uganda
- Uruguay
- Uzbekistan

=== Affiliates ===
In 2001 and in response to calls from the WTO to open itself to more developing nations, the IEC launched the Affiliate Country Programme to encourage developing nations to become involved in the commission's work or to use its International Standards. Countries signing a pledge to participate in the work and to encourage the use of IEC Standards in national standards and regulations are granted access to a limited number of technical committee documents for the purposes of commenting. In addition, they can select a limited number of IEC Standards for their national standards' library. Countries participating in the Affiliate Country Programme are:

- Afghanistan
- Antigua and Barbuda
- Armenia
- Azerbaijan
- Barbados
- Belize
- Benin
- Bhutan
- Bolivia
- Botswana
- Burkina Faso
- Burundi
- Cabo Verde
- Cambodia
- Cameroon
- Central African Republic
- Chad
- Comoros
- Congo (Rep. of)
- Congo (Democratic Rep. of)
- Costa Rica
- Dominica
- Dominican Republic
- Ecuador
- El Salvador
- Eritrea
- Eswatini
- Fiji
- Gabon
- Grenada
- Guatemala
- Guinea
- Guinea-Bissau
- Guyana
- Haiti
- Honduras
- Ivory Coast
- Jamaica
- Kyrgyzstan
- Laos
- Lebanon
- Lesotho
- Madagascar
- Malawi
- Mali
- Mauritania
- Mauritius
- Mongolia
- Mozambique
- Myanmar
- Namibia
- Nepal
- Niger
- Palestine
- Panama
- Papua New Guinea
- Paraguay
- Rwanda
- Saint Lucia
- Saint Vincent and the Grenadines
- São Tomé and Príncipe
- Senegal
- Seychelles
- Sierra Leone
- South Sudan
- Sudan
- Suriname
- Syria
- Tanzania
- The Gambia
- Togo
- Trinidad and Tobago
- Yemen
- Zambia
- Zimbabwe

== Technical information ==
- Graphical Symbols
- Hydraulic Turbines
- Switchgear
- Dependability
- Power Systems Management
- Fibre Optics
- Audio, video and multimedia systems and equipment

== Standards and tools published in database format ==
- International Electrotechnical Vocabulary
- IEC Glossary
- IEC 60061: Lamp caps, lampholders and gauges
- IEC 60417 Graphical Symbols for Use on Equipment
- IEC 60617: Graphical Symbols for Diagrams

== See also ==
- International Organization for Standardization
- International Telecommunication Union
- World Standards Cooperation
- List of IEC standards
- List of IEC technical committees
