= Maarten Devoldere =

Belgian singer-songwriter

- Performing as Warhaus, Mutations Festival Brighton, UK, 24 October 2026

Background information
- Born: 1987 (age 38–39); Ghent, Belgium
- Genres: Soft rock; ballads; alt-pop
- Occupations: Singer-songwriter; poet; producer
- Instruments: Vocals; guitar; trumpet
- Years active: 2004–present
- Formerly of: Balthazar
- Website: warhausmusic.com

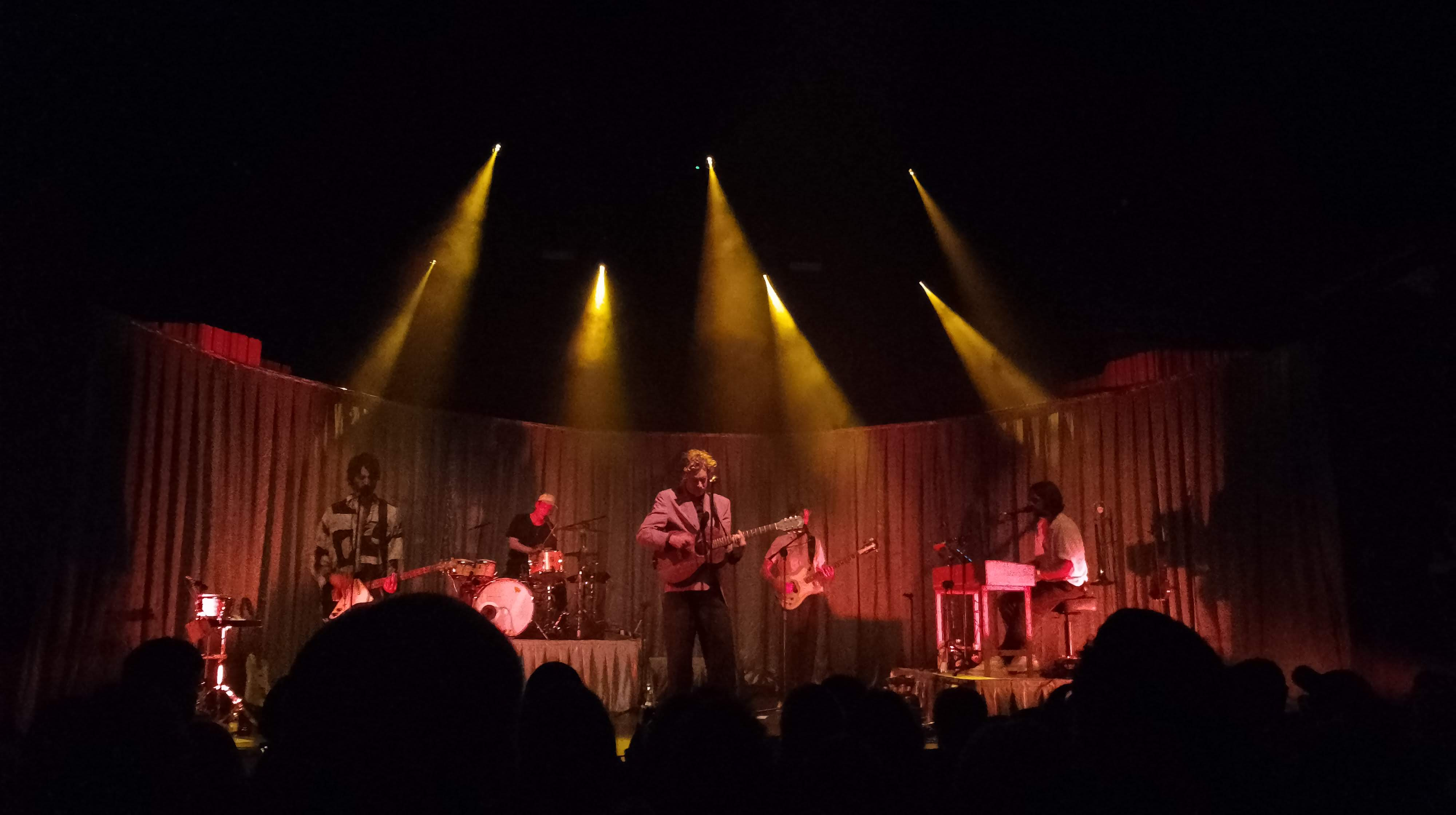
Warhaus concert in Gdańsk (June 2024)

Maarten Devoldere (born in 1987) is a Belgian singer-songwriter and music producer.

Devoldere began his career through his band Balthazar at age 22 with Applause (2010), the first album released by the band formed in 2004. In 2016, Maarten started Warhaus, a solo project.

Despite Balthazar being commonly referred to as an indie rock group, Devoldere has described their songs simply as pop music. The band had recorded three albums and one single, followed by a break, intending to come back and record a fourth album to be released in early 2018.

Maarten's style in Warhaus has been described as a continuation of Leonard Cohen's style, although denser, with influences of Tom Waits' style and Serge Gainsbourg ballad songs. He cites Bob Dylan as his most important inspiration. While recording his solo debut, he spent several months living on a tugboat, sailing the Dutch canals. The boat was named "Warhaus" from which Devoldere took his stage name. He wrote most of the songs for his second self-titled album during a trip to the Tian Shan Mountains in Kyrgyzstan. Most of Warhaus songs on first two albums were recorded with Devoldere's girlfriend at that time, Sylvie Kreusch, a Belgian musician who made her solo debut in 2018. Warhaus third album, Ha Ha Heartbreak, was created after his breakup with Kreusch and was written and partly produced in Palermo, it revolves around the themes of difficult love and various aspects of a broken heart. His fourth album, Karaoke Moon, is the result of Devoldere's self-conscious experiments with introspection, psychedelics and hypnosis and is devoted to themes of masculinity and maturity.

Devoldere lives in his hometown Ghent with his partner and adopted dog Edie.

== Discography ==
Balthazar

- Applause (2010)
- Rats (2012)
- Thin Walls (2015)
- Bunker (2015) – single
- The Break (La Trêve) Soundtrack (2016)
- Fever (2019)
- Sand (2021)

Warhaus

- We Fucked a Flame into Being (2016)
- Warhaus (2017)
- Ha Ha Heartbreak (2022)
- Karaoke Moon (2024)
- The Donkey (2027)
