= International Electrotechnical Vocabulary =

Grouped list of terms and definitions

- Abbreviation: IEV
- Formation: 1938
- Legal status: Active
- Official languages: English, French
- Parent organization: International Electrotechnical Commission
- Website: www.electropedia.org

The International Electrotechnical Vocabulary (IEV) is a managed list of terms and definitions organized by the International Electrotechnical Commission (IEC), which is grouped in classes. It serves to promote the global unification of terminology in the field of electrotechnology, electronics and telecommunications. It is developed by the IEC Technical Committee 1 (Terminology), and published as both the IEC 60050 series of standards and online as the Electropedia. The Electropedia database contains English and French definitions for more than 22 000 concepts, and provides terms in up to 18 other languages.

== Structure ==
The IEV entries are categorised in 9 classes, which group the vocabulary into several subject areas. The names of the classes are as follows:

- Class 1: General concepts
- Class 2: Materials
- Class 3: Measurement, automatic control
- Class 4: Electric equipment
- Class 5: Electronic equipment
- Class 6: Generation, transmission and distribution of energy
- Class 7: Information and communication technologies
- Class 8: Particular applications
- Class 9: Standardization and related activities

The classes are further divided into individual subjects of special knowledge, called IEV parts and marked with a three digit number (PPP). The parts are subdivided by sections, which have a two digit number (SS). In each section, topically sorted IEV entries are listed, having in general also a two digit number (EE). As a result, the IEV identifier for each terminological concept follows the pattern PPP-SS-EE.

== History ==
=== Early history of the IEV ===
At the very first meeting of the Council of the International Electrotechnical Commission (IEC) in October 1908, Mr. A. J. Balfour (later Lord Balfour) referred to the great value of the work the IEC was going to undertake on the unification of electrotechnical terminology. The first Advisory Committee – these ACs have been the predecessors of today's Technical Committees – was founded in 1910 under the leadership of a Belgian chair and had the task to harmonise electrotechnical nomenclature. By 1914, the IEC had issued a first list of terms and definitions covering electrical machinery and apparatus, a list of international letter symbols for quantities and signs for names of units, a list of definitions in connection with hydraulic turbines, and a number of definitions and recommendations relating to rotating machines and transformers. Four technical committees had been formed to deal with Nomenclature, Symbols, Rating of Electrical Machinery, and Prime Movers.

=== First edition of the IEV ===
In 1927 agreement was reached on the system of classification into groups and sections, the system of numbering the terms and definitions, the approximate extent of the IEV and other important items. The first edition of the IEV was published in 1938 with 2000 terms and definitions in English and French, and terms in German, Italian, Spanish and Esperanto. It was the outcome of patient work over 28 years.

=== The IEV grows and goes online: Electropedia ===
Since 1938, although the aim of the IEV remains unchanged – to provide precise, brief and correct definitions of internationally accepted concepts in the field of electrotechnology, electronics and telecommunications – the scope of the IEV has expanded in line with the expansion of the electrotechnical industry.

The number of IEC technical committees is now more than 90, with almost as many subcommittees, and there are more than 22 000 entries in the IEV, covering more than 80 subject areas. The terms and definitions are provided in English and French, and equivalent terms are provided in Arabic, Chinese, Czech, Dutch (Belgian), Finnish, German, Italian, Japanese, Korean, Mongolian, Norwegian (Bokmål and Nynorsk), Polish, Portuguese, Russian, Serbian, Slovenian, Spanish and Swedish (coverage varies by subject area). Traditionally the IEV was developed and published as a series of International Standards, initially under the reference number IEC 50 and later renumbered as IEC 60050, with each part of the standard covering a given subject, such as circuit theory, live working and electrobiology. The online version of the IEV, known as Electropedia, was launched on 2 April 2007.

=== Electropedia becomes a database standard ===
As a collection of items managed in a database, the IEV is an ideal international standard to be managed under IEC's database procedure. Through the use of a web-accessible database and electronic communication a validation team comprising experts appointed by and acting as delegates on behalf of their National Committees evaluate and validate requests to change the database. The change can comprise an addition or deletion, a revision (editorial or technical revision) or a simple correction, and can apply to one or many items in the database. The database procedure encompasses the comment gathering and validation stages of the traditional standards development process and allows for both a rapid procedure as well as the traditional procedure.

=== Future evolution ===
The IEC Technical Committee 1, Terminology, is currently considering whether there is interest in the IEC community to evolve the vocabulary towards an electrotechnology ontology covering electrical, electronic and related technologies.
