= Balthazar (band) =

Belgian indie rock group

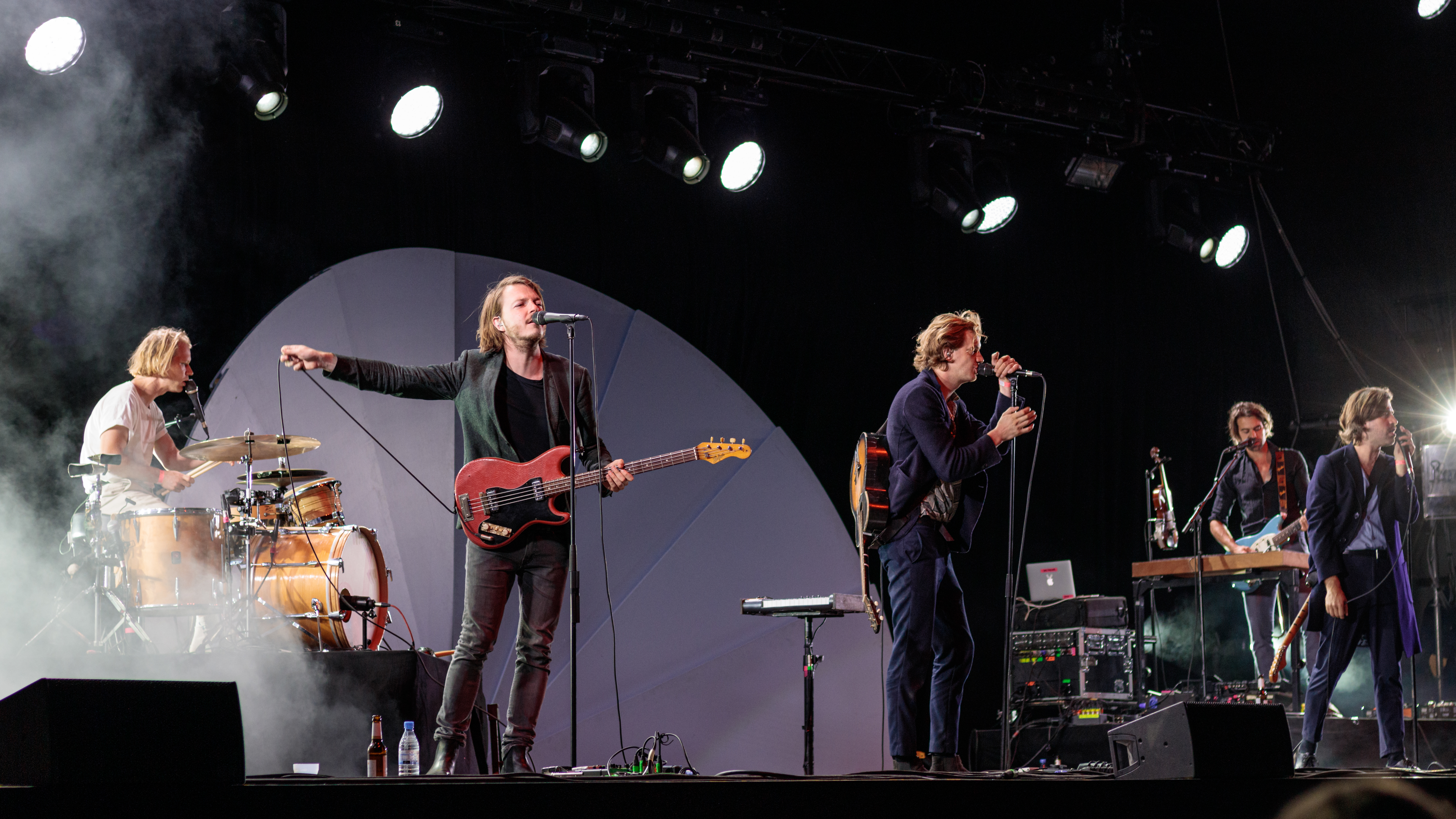
- Balthazar performing in 2019

Background information
- Origin: Kortrijk and Ghent, Belgium
- Genres: Indie pop, indie rock
- Years active: 2004–present
- Labels: Munich Records
- Members: Maarten Devoldere; Jinte Deprez; Simon Casier; Michiel Balcaen; Tijs Delbeke
- Past members: Joachim Quartier; Koen Verfaillie; Christophe Claeys; Patricia Vanneste
- Website: balthazarband.be

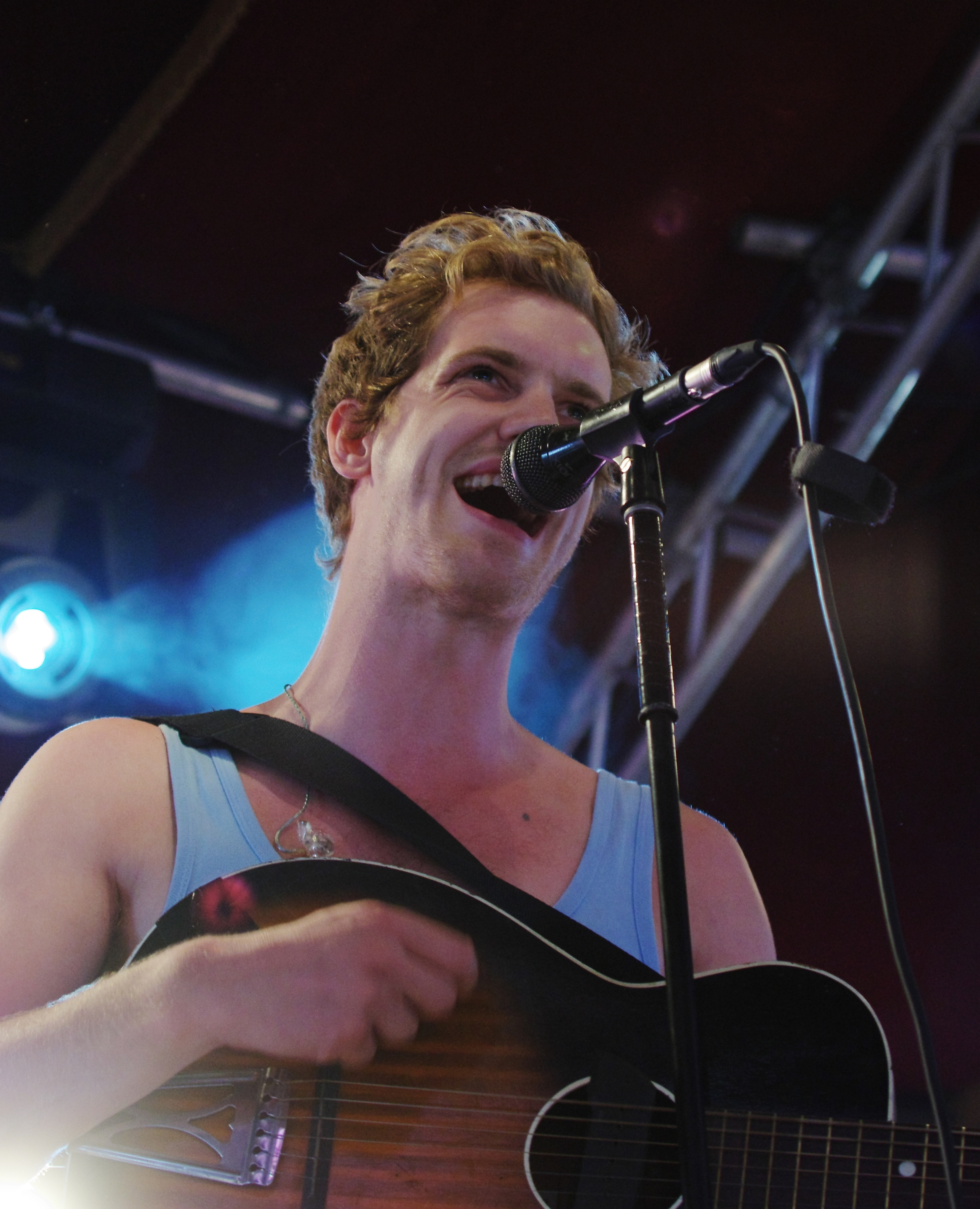
Maarten Devoldere of Balthazar at the Haldern Pop Festival in 2013

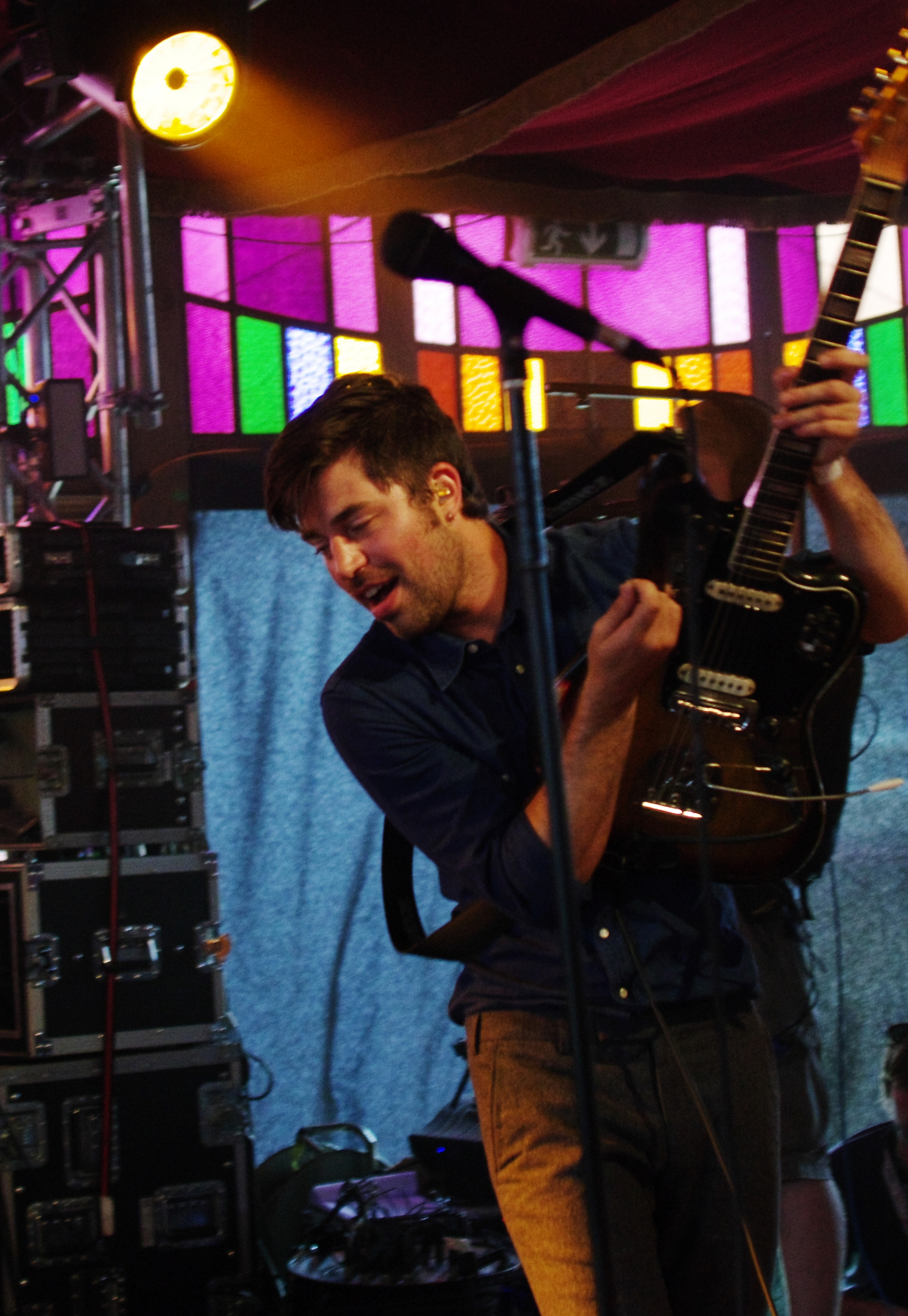
Jinte Deprez at the 2013 Haldern Pop Festival

Balthazar is a Belgian indie pop/rock group. The band consists of Maarten Devoldere, Jinte Deprez, Simon Casier, Michiel Balcaen, and Tijs Delbeke, who all come from the areas of Kortrijk and Ghent (Flanders).

== History ==
=== 2004–2009 ===
Balthazar was formed in the second half of 2004. In the spring of 2005, Devoldere, Vanneste, and Deprez (aged 18 at the time) won the national Kunstbende competition for young people with the song "Lost and Found". On 3 December that year, they also won Westtalent, the rock contest of the province of West Flanders, Belgium.

In 2006, Balthazar won Humo's Rock Rally Audience award, the so-called "KBC Publieksprijs". In August, their first self-titled debut EP was released. In early 2007, after sixty performances, bassist Joachim Quartier and drummer Koen Verfaillie were replaced by Simon Casier and Christophe Claeys.

In July 2007, Balthazar performed at the Dour Festival, which followed the release of their first single "This Is a Flirt". The single was picked up by Radio 1 and Studio Brussel and lingered through the summer in the De Afrekening hitlist, winning second place.

In February 2008, the band released their second single, "Bathroom Lovin': Situations". This time the song ended up in the lists of Humo, Hotlist, and De Afrekening. They played that summer at Folk Dranouter and Marktrock, among others. The band then started performing abroad in Germany, Switzerland, Netherlands, and France. In the summer of 2009, Balthazar went to South Africa for a club tour and then began work on their first studio album, titled Applause. Upon their return home in the end of December 2009, the first single, "Fifteen Floors" was released.

=== Applause (2010) ===
On 22 March 2010, Balthazar's debut album Applause came out in Belgium and the Netherlands. The album was produced by the then 22-year-old Maarten Devoldere and Jinte Deprez and was mixed in Norway by Ynge Leidulv Saetre. Applause was widely welcomed by both the press and the public, thus ending up in the top of many lists, including Focus Knack, De Morgen, and OOR magazine; on 7 January 2011, Balthazar received a Music Industry Award for "Best Album 2010" on MIA's 2010 list. Four singles were released off the album: "Fifteen Floors", "Hunger at the Door", "I'll Stay Here", and "The Boatman".

In April 2010, the band performed at London Calling at the Amsterdam Paradiso, after several bands were canceled in connection with the cloud of volcanic ash over Europe. This was a major achievement for the band in the Netherlands. They performed at several festivals during the summer of 2010, including Rock Werchter, Pukkelpop, Dour Festival, and Lowlands. In the autumn, they sold out a number of club performances in Belgium and the Netherlands.

In the spring of 2011, Balthazar promoted their first album in Belgium and the Netherlands with concerts at the Ancienne Belgique and Paradiso. Their performance at Eurosonic Noorderslag that year did not go unnoticed, and switched their European success into high gear. The band played all across the continent, including opening for The Joy Formidable and dEUS. They then traveled overseas and played for the first time in New York City.

=== Rats (2012) ===
Balthazar's second album, Rats, was released on 15 October 2012 in Europe, excluding the UK. This was again produced by Jinte Deprez and Maarten Devoldere. The album was mixed by Noah Georgeson (Devendra Banhart, The Strokes) in Los Angeles. At the Music Industry Awards in 2012, the band again won the award for best album. Recognition for the album went beyond Belgium and the Netherlands: in France, the prestigious newspaper Libération claimed it was the best album released in 2012.

=== Thin Walls (2015) ===
On 26 January 2015, Balthazar released the single "Then What", which preceded their next album, Thin Walls. The album was released two months later and was generally well received, with among others a first place in Studio Brussel's Afrekening for four weeks in a row. On this album, the band hired a producer for the first time, working with Ben Hillier, known from his work with Blur and Depeche Mode. The album was one of the 19 records nominated for the IMPALA Album of the Year Award. The Thin Walls tour stretched over the whole of Europe, with Balthazar playing at many big concert halls and festivals in Belgium, France, the Netherlands, United Kingdom, Italy, Switzerland, Turkey, and Ukraine.

=== The Break (La Trêve) soundtrack (2016) ===
Balthazar's song "The Man Who Owns the Place", from their 2012 album Rats, plays during the opening credits of Season 1 of the Belgian TV series The Break (La Trêve), and "True Love" from their 2015 album Thin Walls plays during the opening credits of Season 2.

The band's fourth album, Fever, was released on 25 January 2019. It was preceded by the release of the title track on 31 October 2018.

=== Sand (2021) ===
The band released Sand on 26 February 2021. Writing for Beats Per Minute, John Amen commented, Sand offers "captivating vocal performances" and "exemplary hooks", Balthazar actualizing "the potential displayed on earlier projects, distinguishing themselves in a genre packed with talented creators". The cover of the album features Zhdun, an anthropomorphic statue by Dutch sculptor Margriet van Breevort.

== Band members ==
Current

- Maarten Devoldere – vocals, guitars, keyboards
- Jinte Deprez – vocals, guitars, keyboards
- Simon Casier – bass guitar
- Michiel Balcaen – drums
- Tijs Delbeke - keyboards, violin, guitar, trombone

Past

- Joachim Quartier – bass guitar
- Koen Verfaillie – drums
- Christophe Claeys – drums
- Patricia Vanneste – vocals, violin, synthesizer

== Discography ==
=== Studio albums ===
Year	Album	Peak positions				
Year	Album	BEL (Fl)	BEL (Wa)	FRA	NED	SWI
2010	Applause	13	—	—	69	—
2012	Rats	1	57	80	41	—
2015	Thin Walls	2	23	59	19	—
2019	Fever	1	5	30	11	38
2021	Sand	1	1	—	—	23

=== Singles ===
Year	Title	Peak positions				Album
Year	Title	BEL (Fl) Ultratop	BEL (Fl) Ultratip	BEL (Wa) Ultratip	FRA	Album
2007	"This Is a Flirt"	—	4	—	—	
2008	"Bathroom Lovin': Situations"	—	15	—	—	
2009	"Fifteen Floors"	—	19	—	—	Applause
2010	"I'll Stay Here"	—	34	—	—	Applause
2011	"The Boatman"	—	12	—	—	Applause
2012	"The Oldest of Sisters"	—	8	—	—	Rats
2012	"Do Not Claim Them Anymore"	—	5	—	—	Rats
2013	"Sinking Ship"	—	11	—	—	Rats
2014	"Leipzig"	—	10	—	—	
2015	"Then What"	—	2	24	—	Thin Walls
2015	"Bunker"	—	8	25	140	Thin Walls
2015	"Nightclub"	—	7	—	—	Thin Walls
2016	"Wait Any Longer"	—	14	—	—	Thin Walls
2018	"Fever"	47	—	31	—	Fever
2018	"Entertainment"	—	—	28	—	Fever
2019	"I'm Never Gonna Let You Down Again"	—	4	—	—	Fever
2019	"Wrong Vibration"	—	8	—	—	Fever
2019	"Changes"	—	9	—	—	Fever
2020	"Halfway"	—	6	—	—	Sand
2020	"Losers" (original or Purple Disco Machine remix)	—	9	—	—	Sand
2020	"You Won't Come Around"	—	—	—	—	Sand
2021	"Hourglass"	—	5	—	—	Sand

== Side projects ==
After years of playing as Balthazar, some of the band members have started side projects:

- Maarten Devoldere – Warhaus
- Jinte Deprez – J. Bernardt
- Simon Casier – Zimmerman
