= Best Kept Secret (festival) =

Dutch music festival

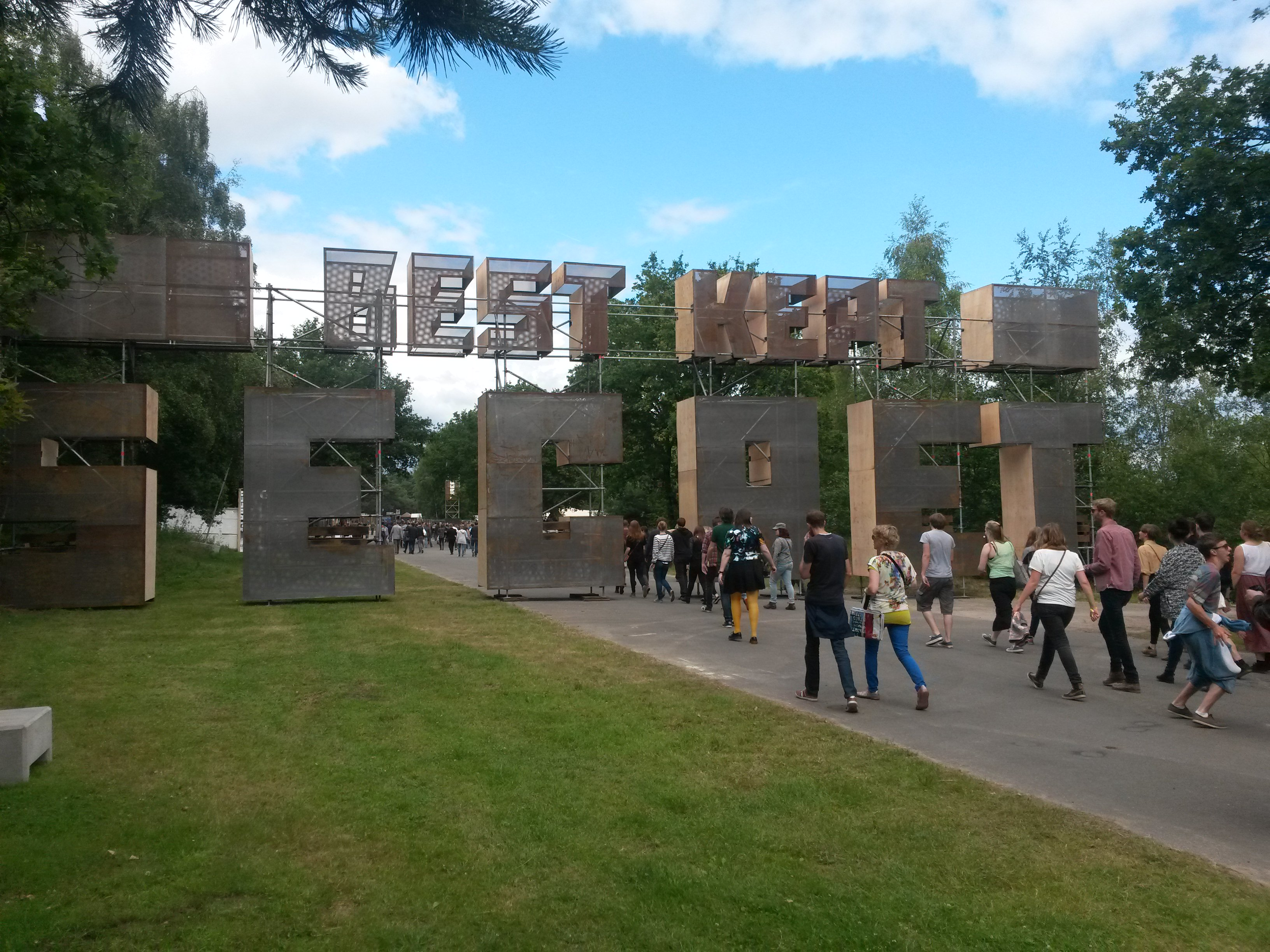
- The entrance to Best Kept Secret in 2014
- Dates: Early-to-mid June
- Locations: Hilvarenbeek, North Brabant, The Netherlands
- Years active: 2013–present
- Website: bestkeptsecret.nl

Best Kept Secret is a three-day music festival held since 2013 in the Beekse Bergen in the village of Hilvarenbeek, which is west of Eindhoven, The Netherlands.

Best Kept Secret is a music festival with a line-up in which big names are alternated with new discoveries from indie, folk, hip-hop, rock, electronics, and a mixture of styles. The festival's centerpiece is a lake in the back of Beekse Bergen safari park. The founder of the festival said that his vision was "aiming to create something that we’d like to go to ourselves".

Best Kept Secret festival has an open-air stage (ONE), three tent stages (TWO, FIVE and SEVEN), and two dance floor stages: THREE and FOUR. For the 2017 edition Best Kept Secret added 'The Casbah', a dive bar and hang-out, which hosts performances of hardcore bands. For the 2019 edition of the festival, Best Kept Secret added SEVEN, a smaller tent stage for experimental performers.

== History ==
The festival is organized by Dutch booking agency Friendly Fire. In June 2013 the first edition was held and it was a sellout with 15,000 visitors daily. The festival has received two nominations at the European Festival Awards:

- Best Festival Line-Up 2014
- Best Medium-Sized Festival 2014

In 2013 the festival won the 'Best Festival Award' at the 'IJzeren Podiumdieren' award show at Eurosonic Noorderslag. The 'IJzeren Podiumdieren' award show is an initiative by the Vereniging Nederlandse Poppodia- en Festivals (Dutch venues and festivals association). Best Kept Secret introduced a concept, a 'food line-up' for the first festival in 2013. The organization strives for diverse and sustainable food options including vegetarian meals, soups, and juices. After the 2019 edition, Maurits Westerik, who is also the frontman of the Dutch band Bewilder, became the festival's new director. He replaced Robert Swarts.

== Festival summary ==
Edition	Year	Dates	Headliners
13th	2027	June 11–13	Fontaines D.C. · JUNGLE · Phoebe Bridgers
12th	2026	June 12–14	Gorillaz · Nick Cave & The Bad Seeds · Jack White
11th	2025	June 13–15	Michael Kiwanuka · Soulwax · Eefje de Visser · Deftones · TV on the Radio · Wilco · Barry Can't Swim
10th	2024	June 7–9	Justice · PJ Harvey · Paolo Nutini · Disclosure
9th	2023	June 9–11	Aphex Twin · The Chemical Brothers · Oscar and the Wolf
8th	2022	June 10–12	Nick Cave & The Bad Seeds · The Strokes · alt-J · Jamie xx
-	2021	Scheduled: June 11–13	Scheduled: The Strokes · Massive Attack · The National (canceled due to the COVID-19 pandemic)
-	2020	Scheduled: June 12–14	Scheduled: The Strokes · Massive Attack · The National (canceled due to the COVID-19 pandemic)
7th	2019	May 31–June 2	Kraftwerk 3D · Bon Iver · Christine and the Queens
6th	2018	June 1–5	Arctic Monkeys · LCD Soundsystem · The National
5th	2017	June 16–18	Radiohead · Arcade Fire · Run the Jewels
4th	2016	June 17–19	Beck · Editors · Jamie xx
3rd	2015	June 19–21	The Libertines · Noel Gallagher's High Flying Birds · A$AP Rocky · alt-J
2nd	2014	June 20–22	Elbow · Franz Ferdinand · Interpol · Lykke Li · Pixies
1st	2013	June 21–23	Arctic Monkeys · Damien Rice · Sigur Rós · Portishead

== Editions ==
=== 2027 ===
Best Kept Secret 2026 (12th edition)
Friday June 11	Saturday June 12	Sunday June 13
JUNGLE; Angine de Poitrine; Freddie Gibbs; Joy Orbison; Wallows; Bente flipturn Gurriers; Kokoroko; Milolaathetlukken; The Hellp; Adult DVD; Greg Freeman; Kaat Van Stralen; MAHA; Prostitute; Romperayo	Fontaines D.C. Benwal; IJSLAND; Julien Baker; The Haunted Youth underscores Altın Gün; American Football; Beach Bunny; Fatoumata Diawara; Young Marco; After; Fauna; Friko mercury milo3 My New Band Believe; OO.OO; The Drones; Theatre; Truck Violence; Villano Antillano	Phoebe Bridgers; Bleachers; Bonobo; King Gizzard & The Lizard Wizard; Sofia Isella; Buraka Som Sistema; DIIV ear English Teacher; Frost Children; Lee Fields @ (atband); AKRIILA; Alice Olsthoorn; Annabelle Dinda; Checkpoint; Geordie Kieffer; PISS; Racing Mount Pleasant; Rogê she's green Super Jet Kinoko; Truman Sinclair; TTSSFU; Twisted Teens

a.o.

=== 2026 ===
Best Kept Secret 2026 (12th edition)
Friday June 12	Saturday June 13	Sunday June 14
Jack White; De La Soul; Mula B Amaarae; Blood Incantation; Curtis Harding; MEROL; NewDad; Sudan Archives; Yin Yin; Ão; Ata Kak; Croíthe; Elmer; Pitou; MAVI; Militarie Gun; Model/Actriz; Pacifica; Shady Nasty; Supermodel*; Swordes	Nick Cave & The Bad Seeds; Hayley Williams; Job Jobse; Sef; Wolf Alice; Aldous Harding; Hiqpy; Naïka; Nation of Language; Tramhaus; Weval (live); Aba Shanti-I; Any Young Mechanic; BCUC; Bruno Berle; Crows; Dame Area; Etta Marcus; GHOSTWOMAN; Grote Geelstaart; Kumo 99; Lucky Done Gone; Maddie Ashman; Madra Salach mark william lewis Midrift; Radio Free Alice; Sorry; The Zawose Queens; Tropical Fuck Storm	Gorillaz; Ethel Cain; Mac DeMarco; Sammy Virji; Don West; Joey Valence & Brae; Jungle by Night; Sophie Straat; Sylvie Kreusch; Wies; Yard Act; Σtella; Another Country $$$$ Apichat Pakwan; C'est Qui? Dressed Like Boys; DYGL; Genesis Owusu; Getdown Services; Gelli Haha; Good Flying Birds; Lime Garden; Mên An Tol; Parker Fans; SERVO; Skullcrusher

=== 2025 ===
Best Kept Secret 2025 (11th edition)
Friday June 13	Saturday June 14	Sunday June 15
Eefje de Visser; Barry Can't Swim; Kaat Van Stralen; Nia Archives; Orchestre Baobab; Frost Children; Daniela Pes; The Dare; Glass Beams; L'Impératrice; Nilüfer Yanya; Antal; Brihang; Cassandra Jenkins; Das Pop; Divorce; DJ Storm; Droom Dit; Erol Alkan (dj); Horsegirl; Kabeaushé; Kin'gongolo Kiniata; Long Fling; Sailor Honeymoon; Snapped Ankles; The Vices; WU LYF; Morpheus	Soulwax; TV on the Radio; Kneecap; Jacob Alon; Kae Tempest; Amenra; L.A. Sagne; Lucy Dacus; Caribou; Songhoy Blues; The Streets; Baby Berserk; Christian Lee Hutson; Cliffords; Danilo Plessow (MCDE); Daufødt; Jasmine.4.T; Khana Bierbood; King Hannah; Lander & Adriaan; Paceshifters; Pigs Pigs Pigs Pigs Pigs Pigs Pigs; Remy van Kesteren; Seun Kuti & Egypt 80; The Pill; TVOD; Ugly; WITCH; Iris Jean; Lael Neale; Ciske Ciska	Michael Kiwanuka; Deftones; Wilco; Youth Lagoon; Elephant; Djo; Magdalena Bay; Maria Iskariot; Waxahatchee; Fcukers; Blanco White; The Backseat Lovers; Big Special; Brass Rave Unit; Dummy; Ellis•D; Gouge Away; Personal Trainer; Rats on Rafts; Spellling; Split System; The Thing they are gutting a body of water This Is Lorelei; Wine Lips; YĪN YĪN; Merce Lemon; TJE; Emma Hessels

=== 2024 ===
Best Kept Secret 2024 (10th edition)
Friday June 7	Saturday June 8	Sunday June 9
Disclosure; St. Vincent; BADBADNOTGOOD; Viagra Boys; Ki/Ki; La Femme; Libianca; Omar Apollo; Sofia Kourtesis (Live); Baxter Dury; The Armed; English Teacher; St. Paul & The Broken Bones; Katy Kirby; Mannequin Pussy; Chastity Belt; Minyo Crusaders; Alice Phoebe Lou; Snõõper; Texoprint; Upchuck; Iconic (Queer Pop); Vals Alarm; Ise; Droom Dit	Paolo Nutini; Slowdive; Vince Staples; Osees; Parcels; Altin Gün; Fatoumata Diawara; Merol; Deijuvhs; Ratboys; Etran De L'Aïr; Library Card; Mildlife; Royel Otis; The Amazons; The Mary Wallopers; Faux Real; Mula B Tjade; Tramhaus; Grace Cummings; Cherry Glazerr; YHWH Nailgun; Lambrini Girls; Infinity Song; CMAT; Winter; Lézard; Porcelain ID	Justice; PJ Harvey; Floating Points; De Jeugd van Tegenwoordig; Amyl and the Sniffers; Billy Woods; Jockstrap; The Haunted Youth; The Mysterines; Warhaus; Water from Your Eyes; Tamino; Dorian Electra; Sprints; Slow Pulp; The Indien; Pip Blom; Ada Oda; Ali; Coloray; Gurriers; Hiqpy; Paris Paloma; Parker Fans; Thandii; Affaire néomí

=== 2023 ===
Best Kept Secret 2023 (9th edition)
Friday June 9	Saturday June 10	Sunday June 11
The Chemical Brothers; Caroline Polachek; The 1975; Charlotte Adigéry & Bolis Pupul; De Staat; Joey Valence & Brae; Cumgirl8; Sudan Archives; Personal Trainer; Unknown Mortal Orchestra; Sylvie Kreusch; Billy Nomates; The Voidz; Erika de Casier; Glass Beams; Gretel Hänlyn; Hermanos Gutiérrez; M(h)aol; Wodan Boys; Silvana Estrada; Frankie Stew & Harvey Gunn; Job & Fred Band; Philou Louzolo; Shimza	Oscar and the Wolf; Young Fathers; Young Marco; Pitou; Black Country, New Road; De Staat; Psychedelic Porn Crumpets; Kevin Morby; Interpol; Two Door Cinema Club; Tinariwen; Dope Lemon; Goldband; Alex G Lankum; Gaye Su Akyol; Big Joanie; Terzij de Horde; HAAi; CLT DRP; The Cool Greenhouse; Hammok; Ineffekt; Marathon; Peach Pit; Sir Chloe; Sophie Straat; Stone; De Toegift	Aphex Twin; The Mars Volta; Nation of Language; De Staat; Alvvays; Christine and the Queens; Lambrini Girls; Crack Cloud w/choir Cola; Julia Jacklin; Japanese Breakfast; Kurt Vile & The Violators; Röyksopp; Oumou Sangaré; The Comet Is Coming; Sorry; Arlo Parks; Pongo; Surf Curse; Bumble B. Boy; Lime Garden; Mich; Sarah Neutkens x Kamerata Zuid; Somebody's Child; Yot Club

=== 2022 ===
Best Kept Secret 2022 (8th edition)
Friday June 10	Saturday June 11	Sunday June 12
alt-J; Jamie xx Jessie Ware; Leon Bridges; Mavis Staples; Sigrid; 4B2M; Altin Gün; DIIV; Elias Mazian; Faye Webster; Genesis Owusu; Giant Rooks; Gustaf; Iceage; John Talabot; Merol; Sad Night Dynamite; Talk Show; Tramhaus; Wies; Yasmin Williams	The Strokes; Beach House; Big Thief; Boy Pablo dEUS; Fontaines D.C. Froukje; Metronomy; Beach Bunny; Carista; Cero Ismael; Future Husband; Jensen McRae; Just Mustard; Keiyaa; Kikagaku Moyo; L'Rain; Pip Blom; Porridge Radio; Sef & het El Salvador Ensemble; The Vices; Unschooling; Yin Yin	Nick Cave and the Bad Seeds; King Gizzard & the Lizard Wizard; Mura Masa; Sampa The Great; Sky Ferreira; Wolf Alice; 2manydjs Amenra; Automatic black midi Cassandra Jenkins; The Haunted Youth; Jehnny Beth; Luz; Meskerem Mees; Nagasaki Swim; Nilüfer Yanya; Novastar; Spellling

=== 2019 ===
Best Kept Secret 2019 (7th edition)
Friday May 31	Saturday June 1	Sunday June 2
Bon Iver; Charlotte Gainsbourg; DJ Koze; Primal Scream; Spiritualized; Shame; Crack Cloud; Jambinai; Priests; Psychedelic Porn Crumpets; Stereolab; BCUC; Cate le Bon; SHHT; Angie McMahon; Bountyhunter; Personal Trainer; Julien Baker; John Grant; Miya Folick; Ditz; Charlie & The Lesbians; Krystal Klear; Blossoms; Faye Webster; Broeder Dieleman	Kraftwerk 3D; Sophie; Cigarettes After Sex; Guided By Voices; Mac Demarco; Viagra Boys; Death Grips; Toro Y Moi; Wooden Shjips; Ex Hex; Yves Tumor; Borokov Borokov; LSDXOXO; Ron Gallo; Snail Mail; Charlotte Adigéry; The Beths; Fornet; Wallows; Fat White Family; Feng Suave; Lucy Dacus; Aldous Harding; Phosphorescent; Sports Team; The Nude Party	Christine & The Queens; Carly Rae Jepsen; The Raconteurs; Interpol; Kurt Vile & The Violators; Big Thief; Indian Askin; Kae Tempest; Lizzo; Cautious Clay; Georgia Anne Muldrow; Princess Nokia; Stephen Malkmus & The Jicks; Liz Phair; Julia Holter; Caroline Rose; Whispering Sons; Cautious Clay; Ramses3000; Pink Noise; Romperayo; Lewsberg; Iguana Death Cult; Juke Ross

=== 2018 ===
Best Kept Secret 2018 (6th edition)
Friday June 8	Saturday June 9	Sunday June 10
Arctic Monkeys; Chvrches; Deerhunter; Future Islands; Tyler, the Creator...And You Will Know Us by the Trail of Dead; Naaz; Rex Orange County; The Comet is Coming; Tom Grennan; The Districts; Job Jobse; All Them Witches; Altın Gün; Sudan Archives; Flohio; Volcano Boys; Crows	The National; Wolf Alice; Warpaint; Vince Staples; The Kills; Isaac Gracie; Slowdive; Johan; Angus & Julia Stone; Four Tet; The Internet; Vince Staples; Alex Cameron; Shanti Celeste; Big Ups; Wavves; Pale Waves; Mattiel	LCD Soundsystem; Father John Misty; Rodriguez; Spoon; Mogwai; Khruangbin; Ty Segall; Unknown Mortal Orchestra; Gang of Youths; Preoccupations; Rostam; Superorganism; Waxahatchee; Dermot Kennedy; Yellow Days; John Maus; Vagabon

=== 2017 ===
Best Kept Secret 2017 (5th edition)
Friday June 16	Saturday June 17	Sunday June 18
Run The Jewels; Agnes Obel; Metronomy; King Gizzard & the Lizard Wizard; Section Boyz; Amber Arcades; Denis Sulta; DJ Prime; Hundred Waters; Jenny Hval; Joey Purp; Jo Goes Hunting; Kelly Lee Owens; Kornél Kovács; Leif Vollebekk; Mannequin Pussy; Real Estate	Arcade Fire; The Boxer Rebellion; Floating Points; George Ezra; Andy Shauf; Chris Cohen; Circa Waves; Cloud Nothings; Froth; Her; Honeyblood; Joy Orbison; Kaitlyn Aurelia Smith; Kim Janssen; Laurel Halo	Radiohead; Aurora; James Blake; Kaleo; RY X Soulwax; Strand Of Oaks; American Football; Arab Strap; Junun ft. Shye Ben Tzur & The Rajasthan Express; Canshaker Pi; Cass McCombs; Fil Bo Riva; Henry Wu presents The Kamaal Williams Experience; Iguana Death Cult; Kadhja Bonet; Kikagaku Moyo; Marlon Williams

=== 2016 ===
Best Kept Secret 2016 (4th edition)
Friday June 17	Saturday June 18	Sunday June 19
Beck; Beach House; Christine & The Queens; Wolf Parade; DIIV; Mystery Jets; HONNE; Slow Magic; Empress Of; The Heavy; Preoccupations; Moon Duo; Beach Slang; Palmbomen II	Editors; Caribou; Air; Bloc Party; Dinosaur Jr. Destroyer; Glass Animals; Bewilder; Sleaford Mods; Blossoms; Low; Julien Baker; Black Box Revelation; Kelvin Jones; Pional (live)	Jamie xx Two Door Cinema Club; Wilco; Yelawolf; Yeasayer; Band of Horses; BADBADNOTGOOD; Fat White Family; Oneohtrix Point Never; Indian Askin; Unknown Mortal Orchestra; Half Moon Run; VANT

In total, around 100 artists, bands and DJ's performed at Best Kept Secret festival 2016.

=== 2015 ===
Best Kept Secret 2015 (3rd edition)
Friday June 19	Saturday June 20	Sunday June 21
The Libertines; The Jesus and Mary Chain; The Tallest Man On Earth; Chet Faker; Earl Sweatshirt; Eskmo; The Pop Group; Binkbeats; Blanck Mass; Daniel Norgren; Daniel Romano; Eagulls; Kevin Morby; Liima; METZ; Off! Pissed Jeans; St. Paul and The Broken Bones; Strand of Oaks; The Coathangers; Vessels; Yak	Noel Gallagher's High Flying Birds; A$AP Rocky; RIDE; Death Cab for Cutie; Of Monsters and Men; The Vaccines; Temples; Daniel Wilson; Fickle Friends; Föllakzoid; Ghost Culture; Hinds; Hookworms; John Coffey; Kiasmos; Kindness; Little May; Matthew E. White; Mourn; Outfit	alt-J; Royal Blood; SOHN; Black Mountain; Evian Christ; First Aid Kit; Future Islands; Jonny Greenwood & The London Contemporary Orchestra; Mew; Alvvays; Ariel Pink; Cairo Liberation Front; Dan Deacon; Gengahr; Kae Tempest; Marmozets; Pretty Vicious; Reigning Sound; Steve Gunn; Sunset Sons; Waxahatchee; Wolf Alice

In total, around 95 artists, bands and DJ's performed at Best Kept Secret festival 2015.

=== 2014 ===
Best Kept Secret 2014 (2nd edition)
Friday June 20	Saturday June 21	Sunday June 22
Pixies; Interpol; Caribou; James Blake; Midlake; Breton; Circa Waves; Telegram; Jaakko Eino Kalevi; Broken Twin; Samaris; Eaux; Cosmonauts; Falco Benz	Franz Ferdinand; The War on Drugs; Babyshambles; Miles Kane; Metronomy; Chvrches; Mogwai; Nils Frahm; Pink Mountaintops; Radkey; Night Beats; The Wytches; TRAAMS; Girl Band; The Bots	Elbow; Lykke Li; Belle and Sebastian; Angus & Julia Stone; The 1975; Catfish and the Bottlemen; The Notwist; The Horrors; Fat White Family; Truckfighters; Connan Mockasin; Ry X Forest Swords; Deap Vally; Fucked Up; George Ezra

=== 2013 ===
Best Kept Secret 2013 (1st edition)
Friday June 21	Saturday June 22	Sunday June 23
Arctic Monkeys; Bloc Party; Macklemore & Ryan Lewis; Tyler, the Creator; Fuck Buttons; The Maccabees; Danny Brown; Drenge; Splashh; Surfer Blood; Swim Deep; Space Dimension Controller	Damien Rice alt-J; Two Door Cinema Club; Agnes Obel; Allah-Las; Balthazar; Efterklang; Savages; Swans; Wavves; French Films; Iceage; Mozes and the Firstborn; Pantha du Prince; Thomas Azier; Wolf Alice	Sigur Ros; Portishead; Kurt Vile & The Violators; Everything Everything; Black Lips; Local Natives; Palma Violets; Suuns; Cashmere Cat; Skaters; No Age; Traumahelikopter; Autre Ne Veut; The Black Angels
