= Froukje =

Dutch musician (born 2001)

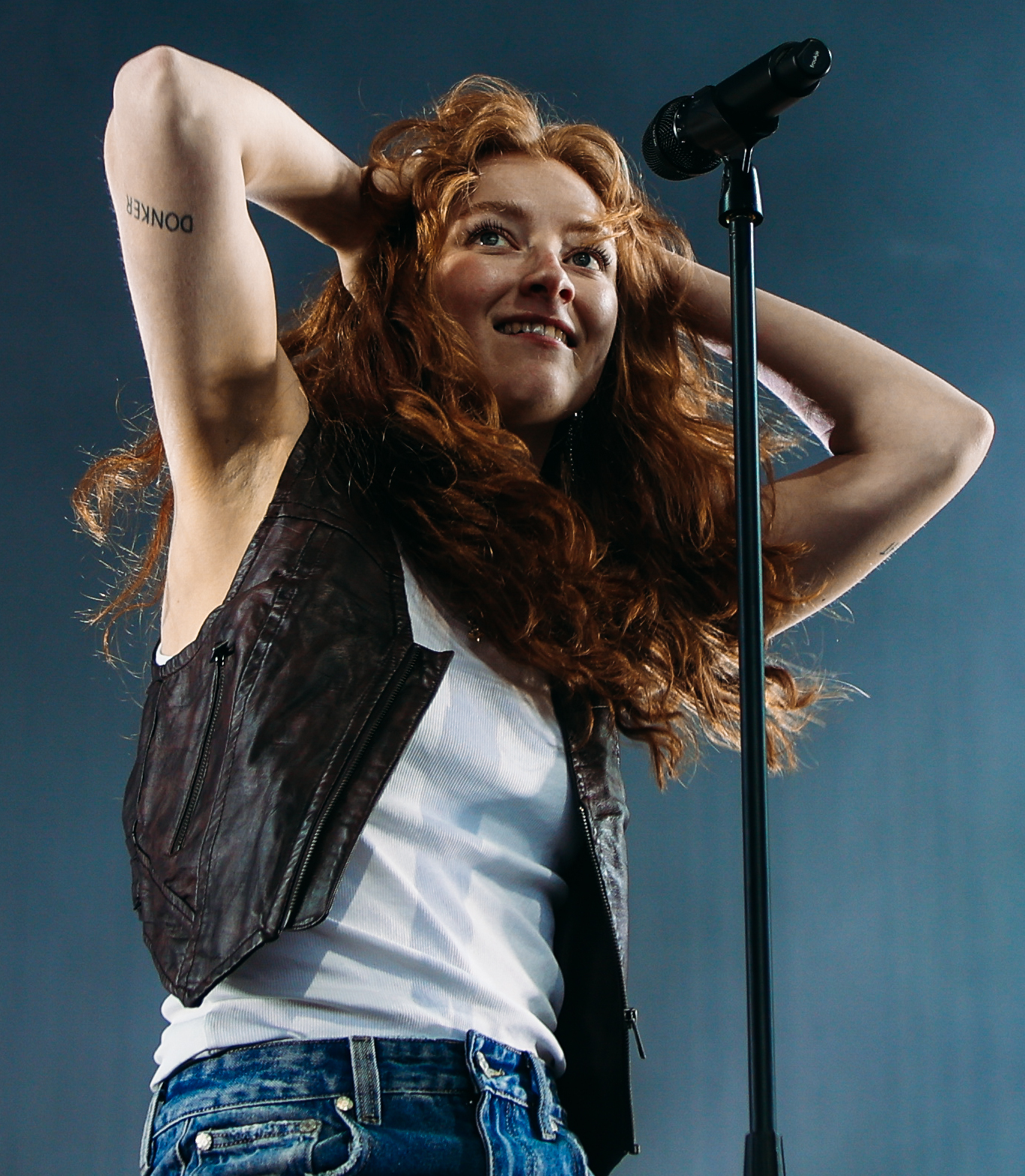
- Froukje performing in 2024

Background information
- Born: Froukje Veenstra; 4 September 2001 (age 25); Nieuwkoop, Netherlands
- Genres: Pop; synth-pop
- Occupations: singer; songwriter
- Years active: 2020–present
- Labels: Frok 'n Roll; TopNotch
- Website: Official website

Froukje Veenstra (born 4 September 2001), known mononymously as Froukje, is a Dutch singer-songwriter from Nieuwkoop, South Holland.

== Early life ==
Froukje Veenstra was born in Nieuwkoop into a family of teachers, for whom music always played a central role. She attended high school at the Scala College in Alphen aan den Rijn. She used to play in the band Ginger Squad together with her father and her sister and later in other bands, including Chicks & Wings. When she was 16, she moved to Rotterdam to enrol at Codarts, the Rotterdam Conservatory of Music. Her studies were disrupted from 2020 onward by the COVID-19 pandemic. Over the course of the pandemic, she was also unable to perform in front of an audience.

== Career ==
Her first song "Groter Dan Ik", a protest song about the climate crisis, was released in early 2020. The song had been streamed 1.7 million times in less than one year. Later that year, her second song "Ik wil dansen" was released. With this single, she entered the Dutch Single Top 100 for the first time. In January 2021, her first EP Licht en donker was released. It reached the second position in the Dutch Album Top 100.

In 2022 her second EP Uitzinnig was released. That summer, she performed at several big regional festivals, including Pinkpop Festival, Pukkelpop, Lowlands, Best Kept Secret and Concert at SEA. At the end of the year, she had three songs voted into the annual Dutch Top 2000 greatest songs of all time program, the highest being "Ik wil dansen" at No. 397. Throughout 2021, that song was used as a slogan during protests for reopening nightlife that had been shuttered by the pandemic.

In January 2024, she released her debut album Noodzakelijk verdriet. It debuted at number one in the Netherlands and Belgium (Flanders).

== Musical style ==
Veenstra composes her own music with the help of a laptop, a guitar or a keyboard. Lyrically she is influenced by Maarten van Roozendaal and Theo Nijland. She is also inspired by Eefje de Visser, Typhoon and Stromae.

== Personal life ==
Veenstra is openly bisexual. Her single "Niets tussen" was written about being in love with a woman.

== Discography ==
=== Studio albums ===
Title	Details	Peak chart positions		Certification
Title	Details	NLD	BEL (FL)	Certification
Noodzakelijk verdriet	Released: 12 January 2024; Label: Frok 'n Roll; Format: streaming, digital download	1	1	NVPI: Gold
Kijk je naar mij?	Released: 2 October 2026; Label: Frok 'n Roll; Format: streaming, digital download	1	7	

=== Collaborative albums ===
Title	Details	Peak chart positions	
Title	Details	NLD	BEL (FL)
Froukje Loves S10, S10 Loves Froukje (with S10)	Released: 14 November 2025; Label: Noah's Ark, Frok 'n Roll; Format: LP	10	130

=== Extended plays ===
Title	Details	Peak chart positions		Certification
Title	Details	NLD	BEL (FL)	Certification
Licht en donker	Released: 8 January 2021; Label: TopNotch; Format: streaming, digital download	2	61	NVPI: Gold
Uitzinnig	Released: 18 March 2022; Label: TopNotch; Format: streaming, digital download	5	24	

=== Singles ===
Title	Year	Peak chart positions		Certification	Album
Title	Year	NLD Dutch Top 40	NLD Single Top 100	Certification	Album
"Groter dan ik"	2020	—	—		
"Ik wil dansen"	2020	—	74	NVPI: Gold	Licht en donker
"Licht en donker"	2020	—	—		Licht en donker
"Onbezonnen"	2021	—	—	NVPI: Gold	Licht en donker
"Niets tussen"	2021	tip20	100	NVPI: Gold	Uitzinnig
"Een teken"	2021	tip4	65	NVPI: Gold	Uitzinnig
"Uitzinnig"	2022	—	92		Uitzinnig
"Zonder gezicht" (with S10)	2022	tip5	37		Uitzinnig
"Nooit meer spijt" (with S10)	2022	32	34	NVPI: Gold	Ik besta voor altijd zolang jij aan mij denkt
"Als ik god was"	2023	tip5	54		Noodzakelijk verdriet
"Naar het licht"	2023	tip20	93		Noodzakelijk verdriet
"Houden van mij"	2023	tip21	—		Noodzakelijk verdriet
"Kwijt"	2024	tip1	27		Noodzakelijk verdriet
"Nu ik niet meer over je schrijf"	2024	—	44		Noodzakelijk verdriet
"Onbesproken"	2024	—	59		Noodzakelijk verdriet
"Ik haat hem voor jou" (with S10)	2024	11	5	NVPI: Gold	Froukje Loves S10, S10 Loves Froukje (with S10)
"Hart in brand" (with S10)	2025	15	7		Froukje Loves S10, S10 Loves Froukje (with S10)
"Misschien" (with S10)	2025	—	96		Froukje Loves S10, S10 Loves Froukje (with S10)
"Iedereen gaat vreemd"	2026	39	65		Kijk Je Naar Mij?
"—" denotes a recording that did not chart in that territory.
