= BCUC =

BCUC may refer to:

- Buckinghamshire Chilterns University College, now Buckinghamshire New University, a university in the town of High Wycombe, Buckinghamshire, England.
- British Columbia Utilities Commission, an agency of the government of the Province of British Columbia responsible for regulations of various energy utilities and of the Insurance Corporation of British Columbia (ICBC).
- South-African band Bantu Continua Uhuru Consciousness.
