= Personal Trainer (band) =

Dutch indie rock band

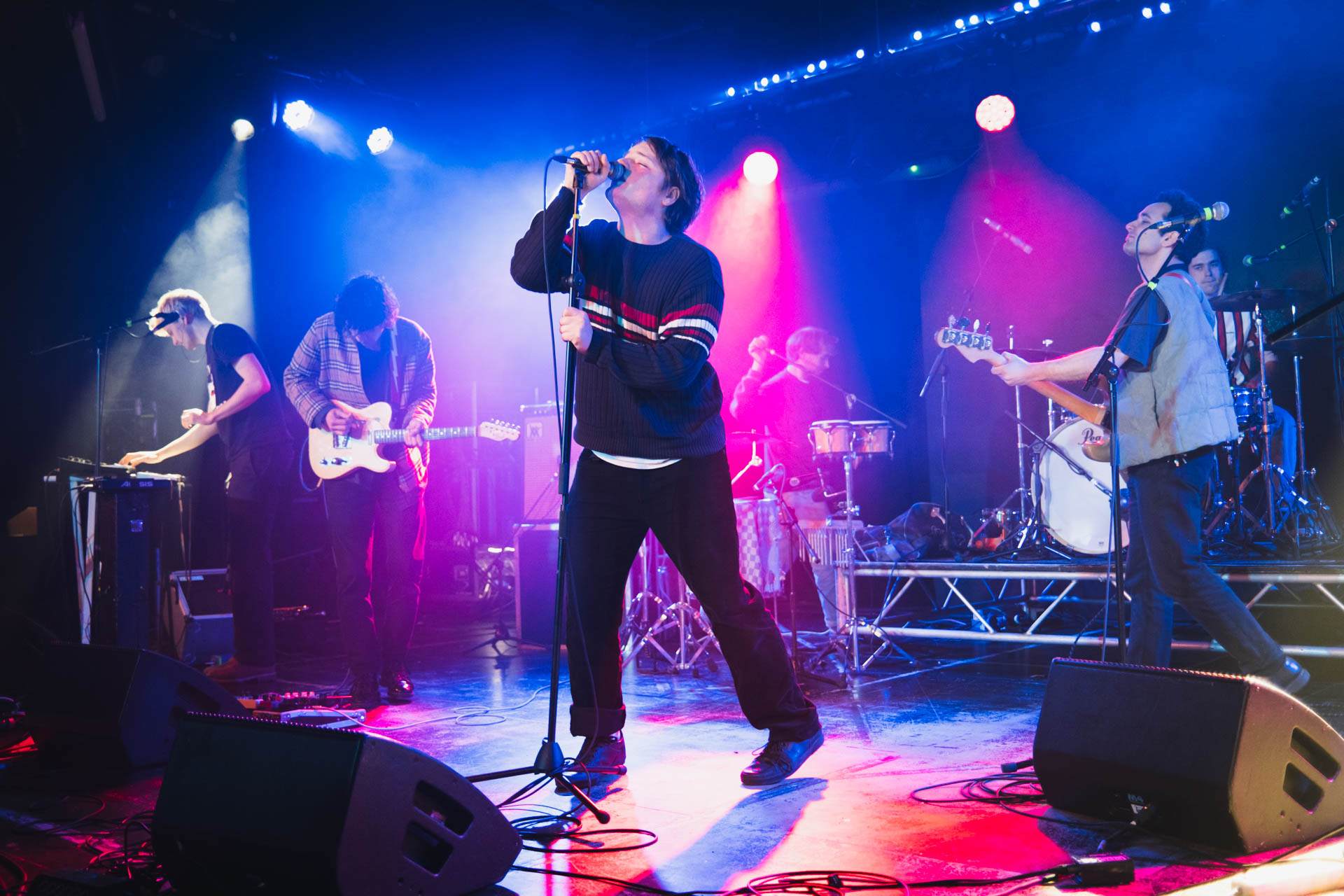
- Personal Trainer performing at Rockaway Beach festival in 2023

Background information
- Origin: Amsterdam, Netherlands
- Genres: Indie rock
- Label: Holm Front, Bella Union
- Members: Willem Smit
- Website: personaltrainertheband.com

Personal Trainer is a Dutch indie rock band based in Amsterdam. The band, occasionally referred to as a collective, is built around frontman Willem Smit and has a continuously changing line-up with which they perform.

== History ==
The band initially started as a solo project of Smit, who frequently asked different people to play along on stage. Currently, Smit is the only permanent member of the group, and his fellow band members rotate between artists who are part of, among others, Pip Blom, Bull, Home Counties, The Klittens, Global Charming, Canshaker Pi, and Steve French.

In 2020, Personal Trainer performed at Eurosonic Noorderslag in Groningen. In 2021, the band played continuously for 24 hours in Paradiso Amsterdam. They have furthermore performed at major Dutch festivals, such as Down the Rabbit Hole, Best Kept Secret, and Into the Great Wide Open.

In December 2023 it was announced that the band had signed to the Bella Union label.

In July 2024, the band released their second album Still Willing.

== Line up (2023 tours) ==
- Willem Smit – vocals
- Franti Marešová – guitar
- Leon Harms – guitar
- Ruben van Weegberg – bass
- Abel Tuinstra – keyboards and trumpet
- Kick Kluiving – drums (Kick announced that he would be leaving the band at the end of 2023)
- Kilian Kayser – percussion

== Discography ==
=== Albums ===
- Big Love Blanket (2022)
- Still Willing (2024)
- Human Assholes (2026)

=== Singles and EPs ===
- "The Industry" (2018)
- "Issue Box" (2020)
- "Politics" (2020)
- "Muscle Memory" (2021)
- "Gazebo" (2021)
- "The Loozer" (2021)
- "Key of Ego" (2022)
- "Milk" (2022)
- "Rug Busters" (2022)
- "The Lazer" (2022)
- "Former Puppy" (2022)
- "Texas in the Kitchen (Live at Katzwijm)" (2023)
- "The Feeling" (2023)
- "Intangible" (2024)
- "Round" (2024)
- "Cyan" (2024)
