= S10 (singer) =

Dutch singer and rapper (born 2000)

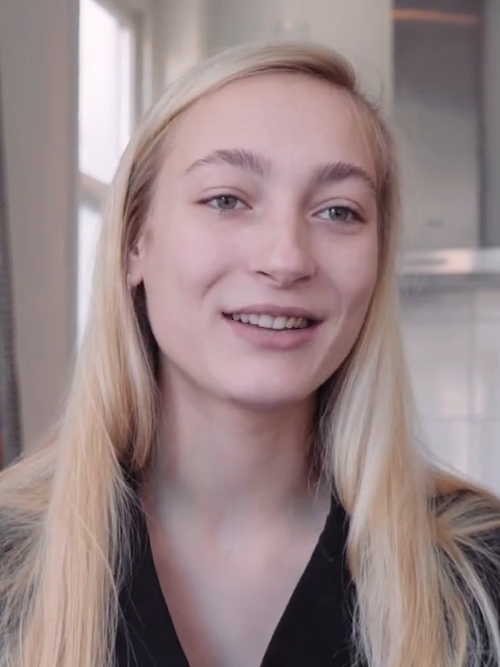
- Den Hollander in 2019

Background information
- Born: Stien den Hollander; 8 November 2000 (age 26); Hoorn, Netherlands
- Genres: Nederhop; alternative pop; emo rap
- Occupations: Singer; rapper; songwriter
- Years active: 2016–present
- Label: Noah's Ark

Stien den Hollander (Note: Dutch pronunciation: [ˈstin dɛn ˈɦɔlɑndər]) (born 8 November 2000), known professionally as S10, (Note: Dutch pronunciation: [ɛsˈtin]) is a Dutch singer, rapper and songwriter. She began her musical career in 2016, and was signed to the Dutch hip hop record label Noah's Ark in 2017. In 2019, she released her debut studio album Snowsniper, which went on to win an Edison Award. Den Hollander represented the Netherlands in the Eurovision Song Contest 2022 with the song "De diepte", the first Eurovision entry to be sung in the Dutch language since 2010.

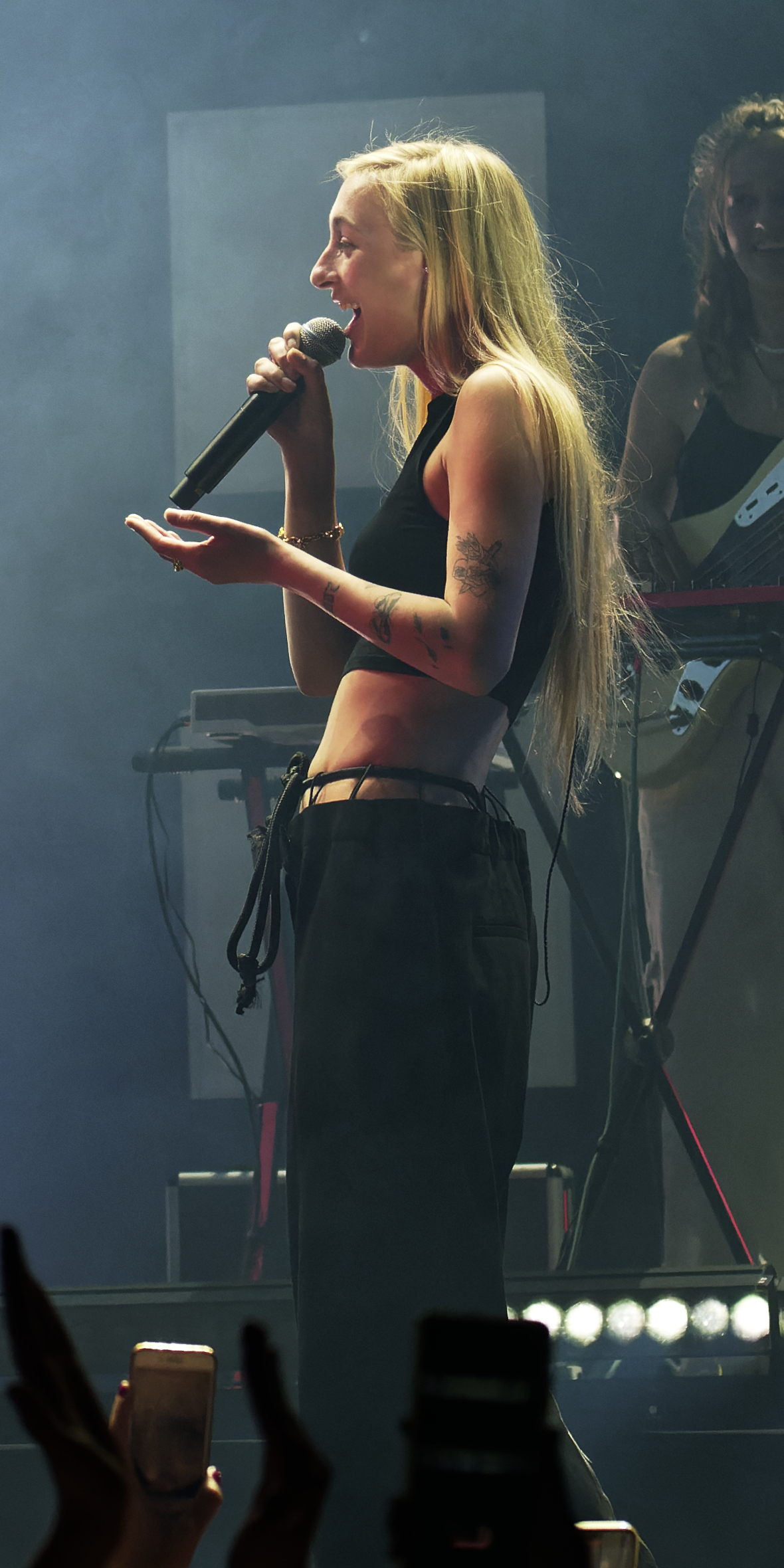
S10 performing at TivoliVredenburg in May 2022

== Early life and education ==
Den Hollander and her twin brother Emiel (died June 2025) were born on 8 November 2000 in Hoorn, North Holland. Since her birth, she has had little to no contact with her biological father. She grew up in nearby Abbekerk and later in Hoorn, where she attended secondary school. After completing the mavo curriculum in 2018, she has been studying at the Herman Brood Academie in Utrecht.

Throughout her teenage years, Den Hollander suffered from mental health issues, including experiencing auditory hallucinations and depression. When she was 14 years old, she was admitted to a psychiatric hospital following a suicide attempt.

== Career ==
In 2016, Den Hollander self-released her first mini-album Antipsychotica, which she recorded using her Apple headphones and uploaded to the online audio distribution platform SoundCloud. Shortly after the release, she was discovered by rapper Jiggy Djé, and signed with his record label Noah's Ark in 2017. One year later, she released a second mini-album, titled Lithium. In her songs, her struggle with mental illness is an important theme, with both mini-albums being named after types of psychiatric medication.

In 2019, her debut album Snowsniper was released. The title is a reference to the Finnish sniper Simo Häyhä, which Den Hollander explained in the media as being "about the cold-heartedness, the solitude" and that "in essence, a soldier strives for peace, just as I strive for peace with myself". The album was awarded an Edison Award in February 2020. In November of the same year, she released her second studio album Vlinders (transl. Butterflies) which peaked at number 5 in the Dutch Album Top 100.

In 2021, Den Hollander scored a hit with the single "Adem je in", which she wrote together with Jacqueline Govaert. On 7 December 2021, it was announced that she had been selected by the Dutch broadcaster AVROTROS to represent the Netherlands in the Eurovision Song Contest 2022. Her entry "De diepte" was released on 3 March 2022 and is in Dutch, making it the Netherlands' first Eurovision entry to be sung in the language since 2010. She followed it up with her third studio album, Ik besta voor altijd zolang jij aan mij denkt (transl. I exist forever as long as you think of me), on 28 October. Her fourth album, Mijn haren ruiken naar vuur (transl. My hair smells like fire), was produced by former Bring Me the Horizon member Jordan Fish and released on 21 March 2025.

== Discography ==
=== Albums ===
==== Studio albums ====
Title	Details	Peak chart positions	
Title	Details	NLD	BEL (FL)
Snowsniper	Released: 8 November 2019; Label: Noah's Ark; Format: streaming, digital download	61	—
Vlinders	Released: 13 November 2020; Label: Noah's Ark; Format: LP, streaming, digital download	5	—
Ik besta voor altijd zolang jij aan mij denkt	Released: 28 October 2022; Label: Noah's Ark; Format: LP, streaming, digital download	5	58
Mijn haren ruiken naar vuur	Released: 21 March 2025; Label: Noah's Ark; Format: LP, CD, streaming, digital download	3	24

==== Collaborative albums ====
Title	Details	Peak chart positions	
Title	Details	NLD	BEL (FL)
Froukje Loves S10, S10 Loves Froukje (with Froukje)	Released: 14 November 2025; Label: Noah's Ark, Frok 'n Roll; Format: LP	10	130

=== Extended plays and mini-albums ===
Title	Details
Antipsychotica	Released: 27 October 2017; Label: Noah's Ark; Format: streaming, digital download
Lithium	Released: 6 July 2018; Label: Noah's Ark; Format: streaming, digital download
Diamonds	Released: 14 March 2019; Label: Noah's Ark; Format: streaming, digital download

=== Singles ===
==== As lead artist ====
Title	Year	Peak chart positions								Album
Title	Year	NLD (100)	NLD (40)	BEL (FL)	GRC	ISL	LTU	SWE	UK (SDC)	Album
"Dark Room Filled with Flowers" (as Stien)	2016	—	—	—	—	—	—	—	—	Non-album singles
"Gucci veter"	2017	—	—	—	—	—	—	—	—	Non-album singles
"Storm"	2018	—	—	—	—	—	—	—	—	Non-album singles
"Hoop" (featuring Jayh)	2018	—	—	—	—	—	—	—	—	Non-album singles
"Ik heb jouw back"	2019	—	—	—	—	—	—	—	—	Diamonds
"Laat mij niet gaan"	2019	—	—	—	—	—	—	—	—	Snowsniper
"Alleen"	2019	—	—	—	—	—	—	—	—	Snowsniper
"Ogen wennen altijd aan het donker"	2020	—	—	—	—	—	—	—	—	Non-album singles
"Love = Drugs" (with Ares)	2020	—	—	—	—	—	—	—	—	Non-album singles
"Maria"	2020	—	—	—	—	—	—	—	—	Vlinders
"Achter ramen" (featuring Zwangere Guy)	2020	—	—	—	—	—	—	—	—	Vlinders
"Adem je in"	2021	—	15	—	—	—	—	—	—	Ik besta voor altijd zolang jij aan mij denkt
"Adem je in (Remix)" (featuring Frenna and Kevin)	2021	3	15	—	—	—	—	—	—	Non-album singles
"De leven" (with Joep Beving)	2022	—	—	—	—	—	—	—	—	Non-album singles
"De diepte"	2022	1	1	4	60	23	8	44	38	Ik besta voor altijd zolang jij aan mij denkt
"Laat me los" (with BLØF)	2022	60	—	—	—	—	—	—	—	Ik besta voor altijd zolang jij aan mij denkt
"Ik haat hem voor jou" (with Froukje)	2024	5	—	50	—	—	—	—	—	Non-album singles
"Hart in brand" (with Froukje)	2025	7	15	39	—	—	—	—	—	Non-album singles
"Buut vrij"	2025	61	—	—	—	—	—	—	—	Non-album singles
"Misschien" (with Froukje)	2025	96	—	—	—	—	—	—	—	Non-album singles
"Safe and Sound" (with Oscar and the Wolf)	2026	—	—	39	—	—	—	—	—	Non-album singles
"—" denotes a recording that did not chart in that territory.

==== As featured artist ====
Title	Year	Peak chart positions		Album
Title	Year	NLD (100)	BEL (FL)	Album
"Onderweg" (Bazart featuring S10)	2021	—	13	Non-album singles
"Schaduw" (KA featuring S10)	2021	19	—	Recklezz
"Zonder gezicht" (Froukje featuring S10)	2022	33	—	Uitzinnig
"Through Fire & Ashes" (Within Temptation featuring S10)	2026	—	—	Non-album singles
"—" denotes a recording that did not chart in that territory.

=== Non-single album appearances ===
Title	Year	Peak chart positions		Album
Title	Year	NLD (100)	NLD (40)	Album
"Codes" (Kraantje Pappie featuring S10)	2018	—	—	Daddy
"Vooruitzicht" (Lijpe featuring S10)	2019	49	—	Fastlife
"Ontastbaar" (Sticks featuring Winne and S10)	2020	—	—	Stickmatic
"Alles waard" (Winne featuring S10 and Raw Roets)	2020	—	—	So So Lobi 2
"Voor mij" (Sor featuring S10 and Jiggy Djé)	2022	—	—	Bae Doven No. 3
"Denk aan mij" (SIM–OJ featuring S10)	2022	—	—	Apocalyps
"Nooit meer spijt" (featuring Froukje)	2022	34	32	Ik besta voor altijd zolang jij aan mij denkt
"De ergste dag" (featuring Mula B)	2022	42	—	Ik besta voor altijd zolang jij aan mij denkt
"Nachten wakker" (KA featuring S10)	2026	43	—	Reset
"—" denotes a recording that did not chart in that territory.

=== Soundtrack album appearances ===
Title	Year	Album
"Bag" (with Kevin and Hef)	2020	Mocro Maffia II

== Awards and nominations ==
Award	Year	Category	Nominated work	Result	Ref.
Edison Award	2020	Alternative	Snowsniper	Won	
Edison Award	2021	Alternative	Vlinders	Nominated	
Edison Award	2022	Alternative	2021 single releases	Nominated	
Edison Award	2022	Song	"Adem je in (Remix)"	Nominated	
3FM Awards	2022	Best Artist	—N/a	Nominated	
3FM Awards	2022	Best Song	"Adem je in"	Nominated	
3FM Awards	2022	Best Collaboration	"Onderweg"	Won	
Gouden Notekraker	2022	—N/a		Nominated	

== Notes ==
Awards and achievements
Preceded by Jeangu Macrooy with "Birth of a New Age"	Netherlands in the Eurovision Song Contest; 2022	Succeeded by Mia Nicolai and Dion Cooper with "Burning Daylight"
