= Twisted Teens =

American rock duo

- Origin: New Orleans, Louisiana, U.S.
- Genres: Slacker rock, alternative country, garage punk
- Years active: 2024–present
- Label: Sub Pop
- Members: Caspian Halliwell; RJ Santos

Twisted Teens are an American rock duo formed in New Orleans, Louisiana. The band consists of vocalist and multi-instrumentalist Caspian Halliwell and steel guitarist RJ Santos. Pairing raspy vocals, lo-fi electric guitar, and heavy basslines with country-style console steel, fingerpicked acoustic guitar, and dark, absurdist storytelling, the band established their signature sound with their 2024 self-titled debut. They built further critical acclaim in 2026 through back-to-back album releases: Blame the Clown in February, followed by Florida Water Blues in July and The Holy Cross Tigers in November. The duo signed to the record label Sub Pop in August 2026.

== Discography ==
=== Studio albums ===
- Twisted Teens (2024), Chain Smoking / Jazz Life
- Blame the Clown (2026), Chain Smoking / Jazz Life
- Florida Water Blues (2026), Going Underground
- The Holy Cross Tigers (2026), Sub Pop

=== EPs ===
- EU EP (2025), Jazz Life
