= Glass Beams =

Australian psychedelic rock band

- Origin: Melbourne, Australia
- Genres: Psychedelic rock; funk; instrumental rock; rock
- Years active: 2020–present
- Labels: Research Records; Ninja Tune Records
- Members: Rajan Silva
- Website: glassbeams.com

Glass Beams is the music project of Indian-Australian multi-instrumentalist and producer Rajan Silva. He founded the group in Melbourne, Victoria, Australia, in 2020 during the COVID-19 pandemic. The band blends Eastern musical elements with contemporary Western music. On stage and in music videos, the band appears in bejewelled doily-like masks.

== History ==
The band's debut EP, Mirage, was released in 2021. The follow-up EP, Mahal, was released on Ninja Tune in March 2024, and entered at #5 in the Billboard Contemporary Jazz Albums chart and #13 on the Billboard Jazz Albums.

In all public appearances, the band wears gold bejeweled glass masks.

Silva is primarily a drummer and records, produces, and mixes all of the band's music.

== Discography ==
=== Extended plays ===
List of EPs, with selected details
| Title | Details | Peak chart positions |
| Title | Details | AUS Indie |
|---|---|---|
| Mirage | Released: June 2021; Label: Research Records | 8 |
| Mahal | Released: March 2024; Label: Ninja Tune | 1 |
