= Apichat Pakwan =

Dutch-Thai band

Apichat Pakwan is a Dutch-Thai band based in Amsterdam. Their music is a mix of mor lam, electronic music, dub and hiphop. They perform with their own compositions, as well as with new interpretations of classic Thai and Lao folkmusic repertory.

The music collective was founded in 2015 by Dutch musician, Olivier Schreuder (electronics, compositions, traditional Thai instruments) and Thai musician, Angkanang Pimwankum (percussion). They compose and perform with an alternating group of musicians from the Northeast region of Thailand, also known as Isan.

The group was called "most innovative molam hybrid" by The Bangkok Post.

== Biography ==
The group was formed in 2015, in Khon Kaen, Isan, Thailand. At that time, Dutch musician. Olivier Schreuder was studying Isan folkmusic and the kaen (Lao mouthorgan) at Khon Kaen University with Thai musician, Pongsapon ‘On’ Upani, who introduced him to Angkanang Pimwankum. Together with phin player, Arthit Krajangsree, they record their first EP called Angkanang in 2016, which was released with the Dutch-Thai label Animist Records. Four tracks of the EP are also released on two vinyl singles.

The group debuted live on the Khon Kaen Filmfestival in 2017, followed by shows in local Thai folkmusic clubs like Kittasin, and Siam Paragon Songkran Wonderland Festival 2017 in Bangkok. The group also toured for the first time in The Netherlands, with shows on the Thailand Grand Festival in The Hague and Blierock in Venlo.

In 2018, Thai singer, Wimonmat ‘Wiw’ Kangjantha, joined the group, shifting the focus from instrumental music to more songs, sung in the Isan language. With Kangjantha, they recorded their third single Leh Dub, which was chosen as one of the best singles of 2018 by The Bangkok Post. They toured in Singapore, Thailand and Laos, with highlights performing on the Jim Thompson Molam Bus stage of the Jai Thep Festival in Chiang Mai, and a live performance on Thai national TV-station Workpoint.

In 2019, they brought more concerts in Thailand, followed by a tour in Europe, including shows on Fusion Festival (Germany), World Experience Festival (Romania), Na Fir Bolg (Belgium), Amsterdam Roots, and the Houtfestival (both in The Netherlands). Together with Thai singer, Anusara ‘Bee’ Deechaichana, they composed several new songs in 2019. In October 2019, they released their first full album on Animist Records called Esantronics. The album was chosen as Best Asian Album of 2019 by World Music Central, and was described as "a superb album where fascinating, innovative Thai roots music meets masterfully-crafted electronica". It received a 4-star-review by the UK's Songlines Magazine. The Bangkok Post called the album "terrific" and "one of those East-meets-West experiments that works very well".

Angkanang Pimwankum and Olivier Schreuder also DJ as Apichat Pakwan, with performances at the Dutch Design Week in Eindhoven, Houtfestival in Haarlem, Ton Tann Reggae Festival, In The Garden Festival in Khon Kaen, and nightclub NOMA (Now Our Mother's Angry) in Bangkok.

== Discography ==
- Angkanang (2016)
- E-Ong Muan Sun (2017)
- Angkanang EP (2017)
- Leh Dub (2018)
- Esantronics (2019)
- Nam Ton Tad EP (2021)
