= Merce Lemon =

American indie rock musician

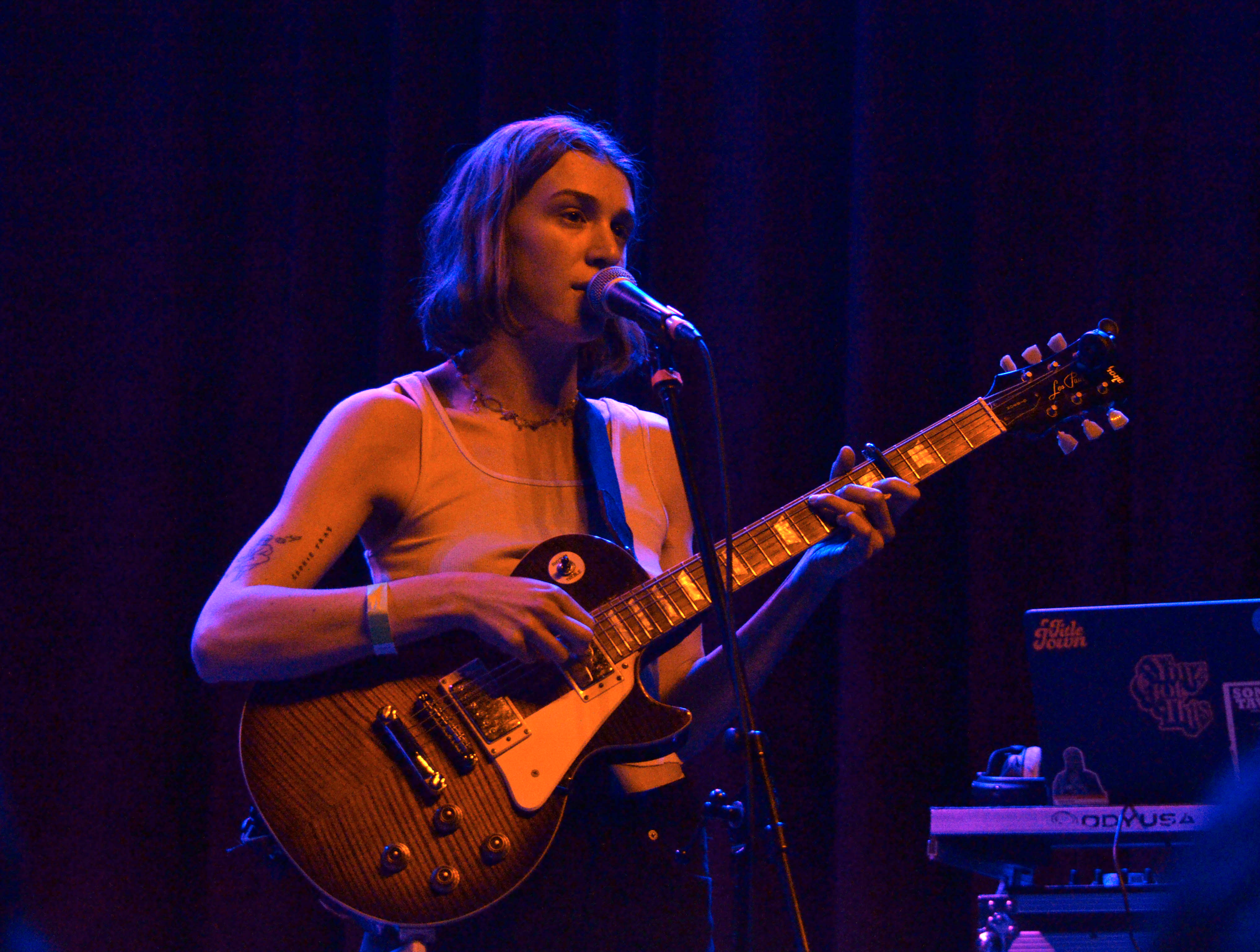
- Lemon performing in 2022

Background information
- Origin: Pittsburgh, Pennsylvania, U.S.
- Years active: 2017-present
- Website: mercelemon.com

Merce Lemon is an American indie rock musician from Pittsburgh, Pennsylvania.

== Career ==
Lemon started playing live music at the age of 12, but did not learn how to play guitar until the age of 17. Lemon released her first album in 2017, titled Ideal for a Light Flow With Your Body. Lemon released her second full-length album in 2020 titled Moonth. Lemon released that album during the COVID-19 pandemic and was unable to tour it. Lemon opted to take a break after the release of that album. In 2024, Lemon returned with her third full-length album titled Watch Me Drive Them Dogs Wild, receiving positive reviews. Also in 2024, Lemon was named an "Artist to Watch" by Stereogum.

== Discography ==
=== Studio albums ===
- Ideal for a Light Flow With Your Body (2017)
- Moonth (2020)
- Watch Me Drive Them Dogs Wild (2024)
