= Pretty Vicious =

Welsh rock band

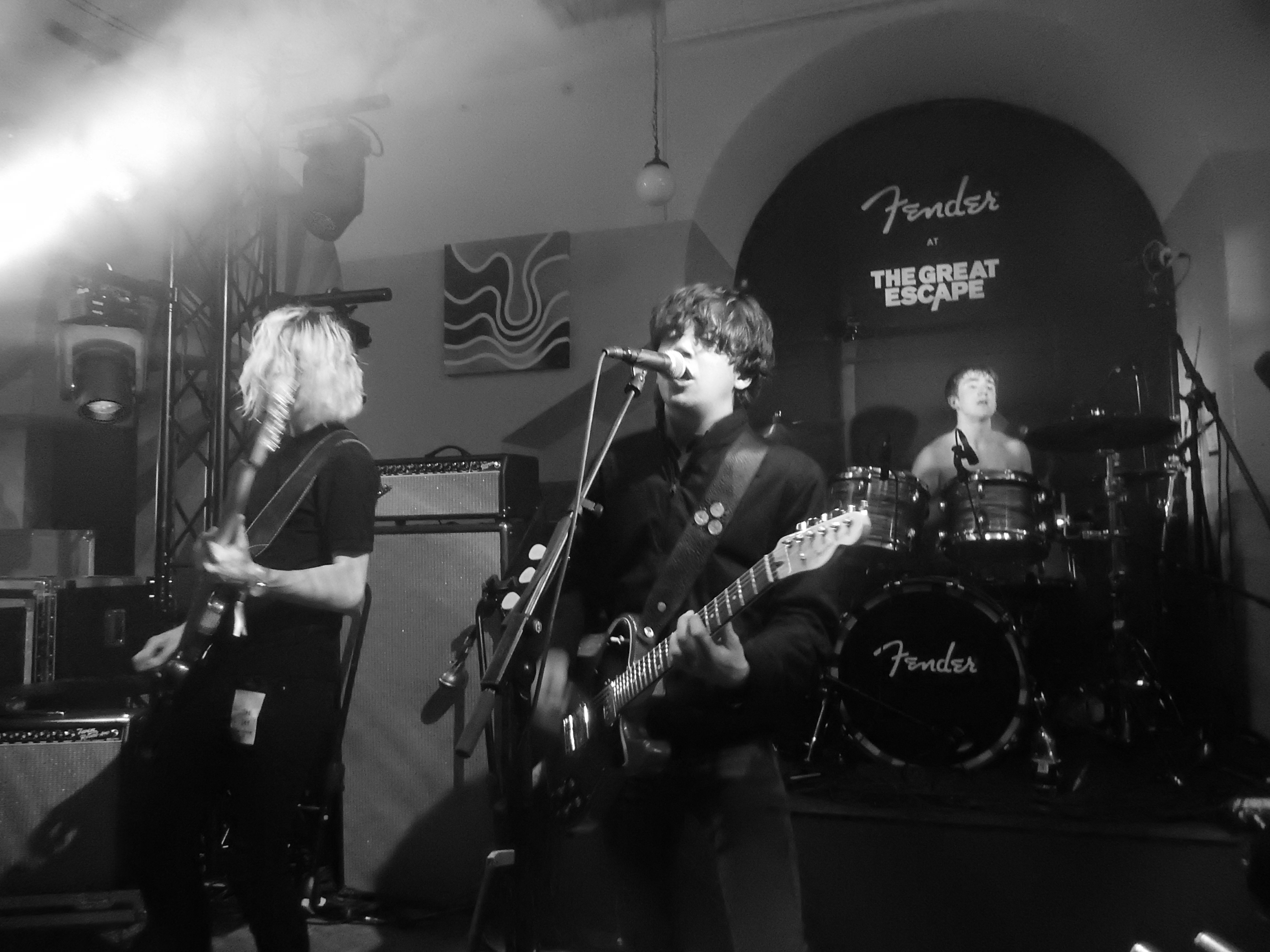
- The group performing at Pattern, during The Great Escape Festival in Brighton

Background information
- Origin: Merthyr Tydfil, Wales
- Genres: Punk rock; alternative rock
- Years active: 2014–2020
- Labels: EMI, Big Machine Records
- Members: Brad Griffiths; Elliot Jones; Jarvis Morgan; Tom McCarthy

Pretty Vicious were a Welsh rock band originally from Merthyr Tydfil, Wales formed in 2014. The group received attention from publications including NME and Paste. The band signed to Big Machine Records in 2018. Singles "Move" and "Are You Entertained" were released under the label. Their debut album Beauty of Youth was released on 12 July 2019.

In a statement issued on 23 October 2019, the band announced that they would be splitting up and then re-emerge as a new group in 2020, without frontman Brad Griffiths, who took a break from performing with the band in 2019, with health issues.

The band's last show took place at 17 January 2020, with Himalayas member Joe assisting in the show.

== In popular culture ==
The song "Are You Ready For Me" was used for the soundtrack of the Square Enix game Life Is Strange: Before the Storm, and the track "Ain't No Fun" is a part of the official soundtrack of Dirt 4.

== Discography ==
=== Studio albums ===
- Beauty of Youth (2019)

=== Singles ===
- "Are You Ready For Me" (2015)
- "It's Always There" (2015)
- "National Plastics" (2015)
- "Just Another Story" (2015)
- "Blister" (2016)
- "Ain't No Fun" (2017)
- "Move" (2018) - Released at 3 August, #30 Mainstream Rock Songs
- "Are You Entertained?" (2018) - Released on 26 October
- "These Four Walls" (2019) - Released on 25 January.

=== EPs ===
- Cave Song (2016)
