= Adult DVD =

English dance-punk band

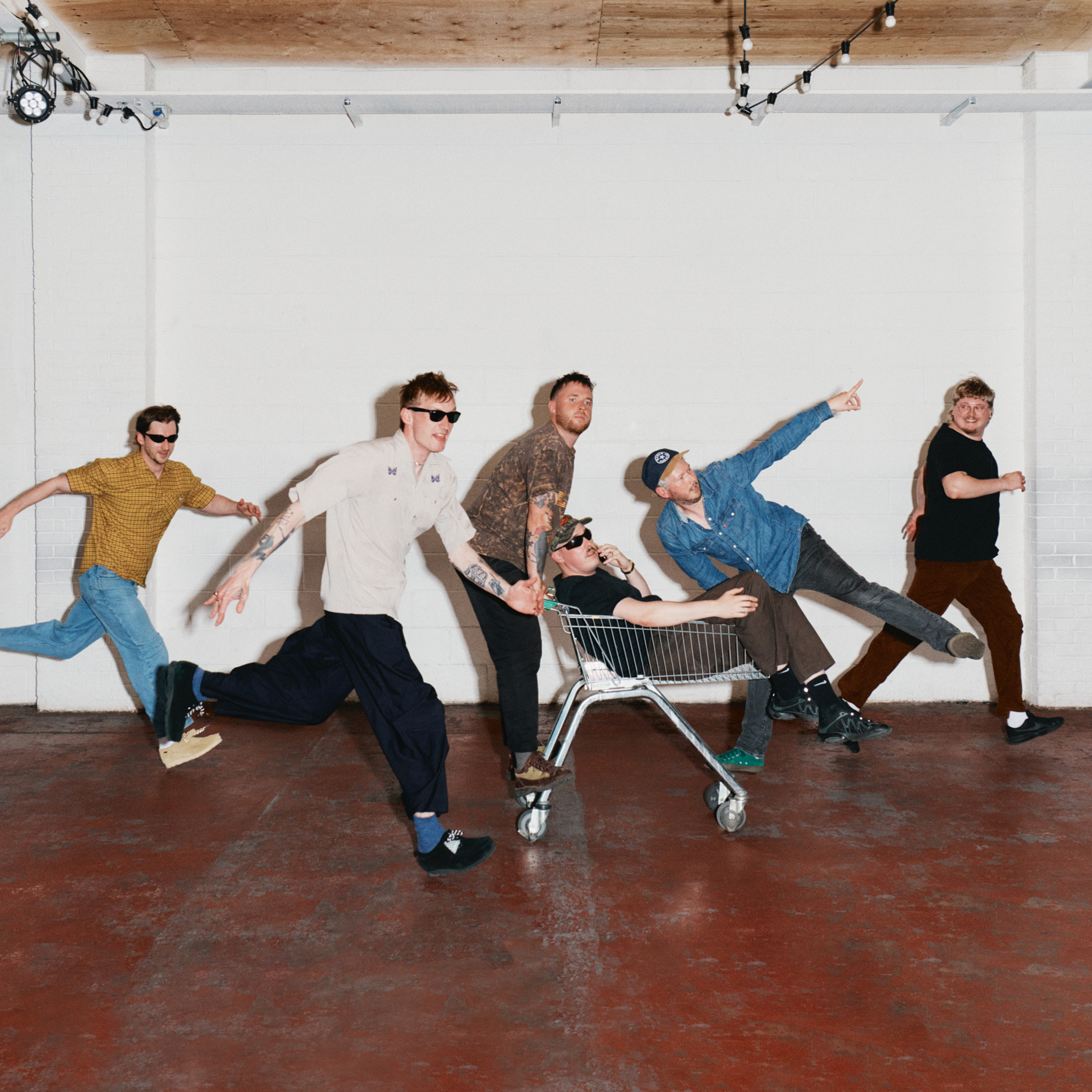
- Promotional photo of the band in 2026

Background information
- Origin: Leeds, West Yorkshire, England
- Genres: Dance-punk; dance-rock; electronic
- Years active: 2021–present
- Label: Fat Possum
- Members: Harry Hanson; Greg Lonsdale; Danny Blackburn; Jake Williams; Jonathan Newell; George Manson
- Website: adultdvd.band

Adult DVD are an English dance-punk band from Leeds. Formed in 2021 by Harry Hanson and Greg Lonsdale, they currently consist of Harry Hanson (lead vocals), Greg Lonsdale (synths, vocals), Danny Blackburn (guitar, synths), Jake Williams (synths), Jonathan Newell (drums) and George Manson (bass). In 2026, they were signed to Fat Possum Records.

== History ==
Adult DVD began with Harry Hanson and Greg Lonsdale "writing tunes via the internet to each other" during the United Kingdom's COVID-19 lockdown. They uploaded their first single "FOMO" to Bandcamp in January 2021, followed by "Broken English" the following month, which was their first single to be made available on major streaming platforms.

After the subsequent release of numerous other singles, the band released their debut EP Fountain of Youth in 2023, followed by their second EP Next Day Shipping in 2024. The single "Do Something" from the latter earned them a place on the B-list of BBC Radio 6 Music. In 2025, they performed on the BBC Introducing stage at Glastonbury Festival.

In January 2026, the band signed to independent label Fat Possum Records, and released the single "Real Tree Lee". In July 2026, the band released "Cowboy On Aisle Three" as a single for their self-titled debut album. The album was released on 25 September 2026. It debuted at number 92 on the UK Albums Chart.

== Discography ==
=== Studio albums ===
- Adult DVD (2026)

=== Extended plays ===
- Fountain of Youth (2023)
- Next Day Shipping (2024)
