= Dummy (band) =

American band

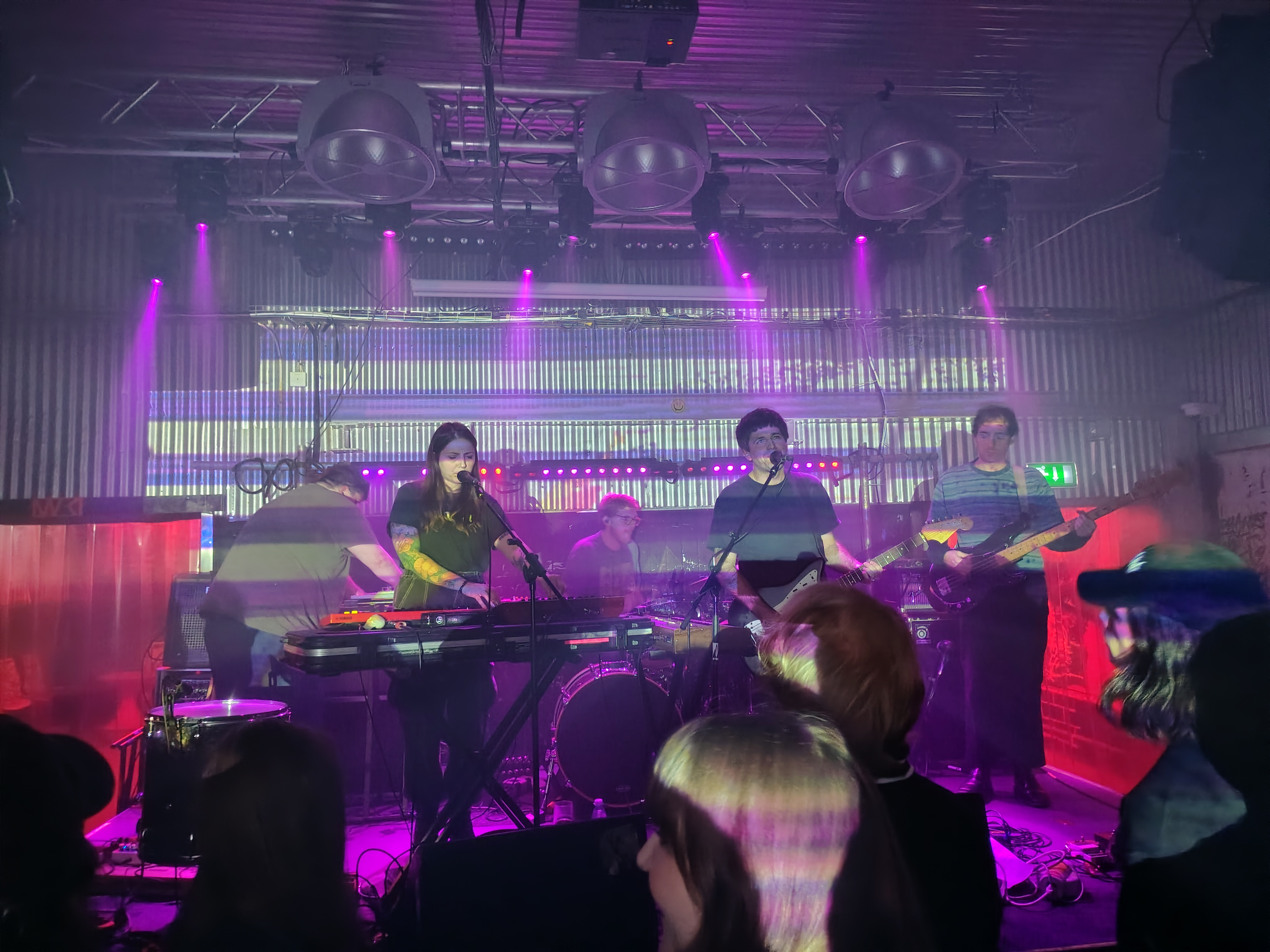
- Dummy live in Stockholm, 2024.

Background information
- Origin: Los Angeles, United States
- Genres: Indie pop
- Label: Trouble in Mind
- Members: Alex Ewell; Emma Maatman; Nathan O'Dell; Joe Trainor

Dummy is an American indie pop band from Los Angeles, California. The group consists of Alex Ewell, Emma Maatman, Nathan O'Dell and Joe Trainor.

== History ==
The group released their first and second EPs in 2020, titled Dummy and EP2 respectively. The group released their first album in 2021 titled Mandatory Enjoyment through Trouble in Mind Records. In 2022, the group released two new songs, "Mono Retriever" and "Pepsi Vacuum" for the Sub Pop 7" series. The group released their second full-length album, Free Energy, in 2024 through Trouble in Mind Records. The album was named "Album of the Week" by Stereogum. and received an 8.0 rating from Pitchfork.

== Discography ==
Studio albums

- Mandatory Enjoyment (2021, Trouble In Mind)
- Free Energy (2024, Trouble In Mind)
- Do You Love the Color of the Sky? (2026, Polyvinyl)

EPs

- Dummy (2020, Pop Wig Records)
- EP2 (2020, Born Yesterday Records)
