= Bantu Continua Uhuru Consciousness =

South African afro-psychedelic future pop band

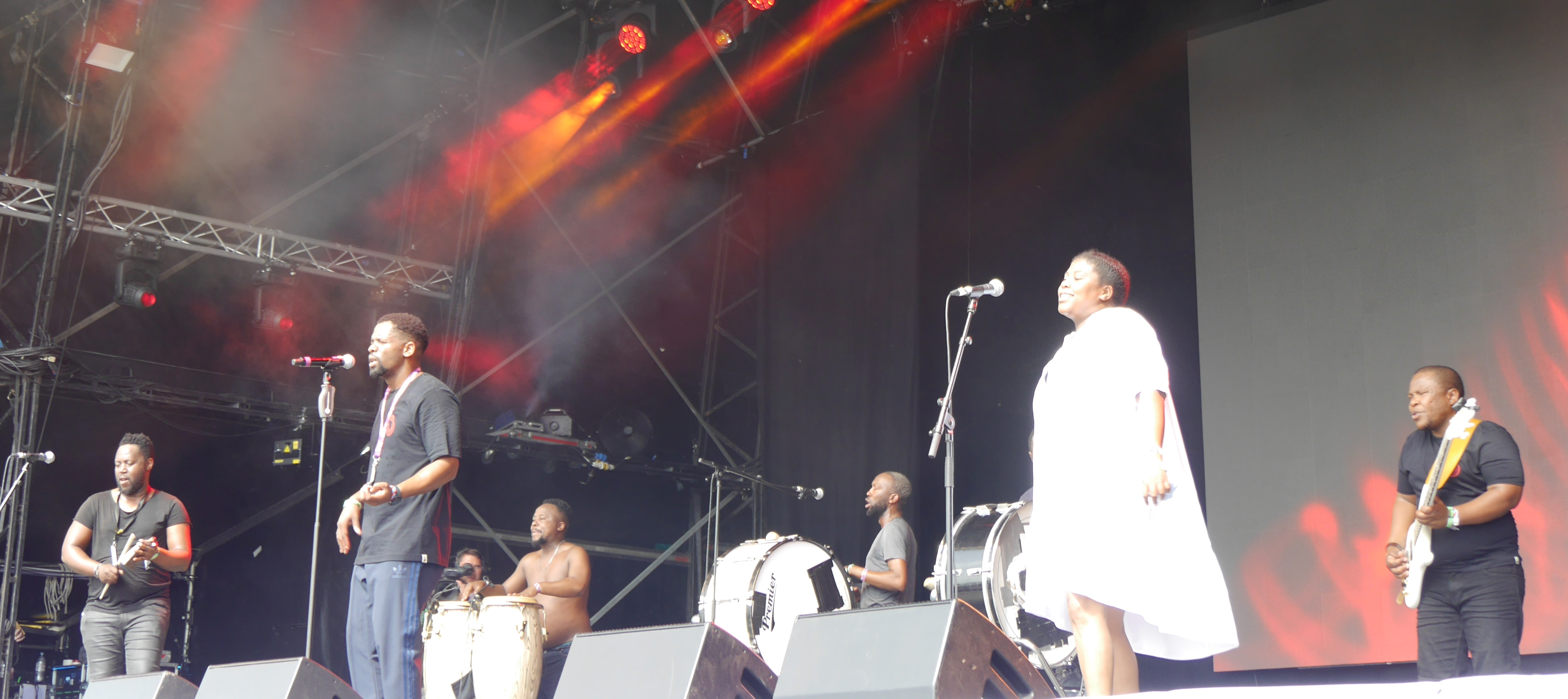
Bantu Continua Uhuru Consciousness, Glastonbury Festival, 2019

Bantu Continua Uhuru Consciousness (BCUC) are a seven member band from Soweto, South Africa. Their music has been described as "afro-psychedelic future pop".

The band formed in 2003, and sings in all 11 of the official languages of South Africa. The band consists of Nkosi "Jovi" Zithulele, Kgomotso Mokone, Thabo "Cheex" Mangle, Mritho Luja, Lehlohonolo "Hloni" Maphunye, and Skhumbuzo Mahlangu, with Mosebetsi Ntsimande of the band Uju as a featured bassist.

== Albums ==
In 2018, BCUC released their second album, Emakhosini. They recorded the album in Lyon. The Guardian gave the album 4 out of 5 stars, describing the album as full of "stirring harmony vocals" and describing it as echoing the "township styles" of South African popular music.

In 2019, their third album, "The Healing" came out. The Guardian gave The Healing 4 out of 5 stars, describing it as "continuing to surprise" and "exhilarating".

== Gallery ==
Vieilles Charrues Festival (France, 2019)

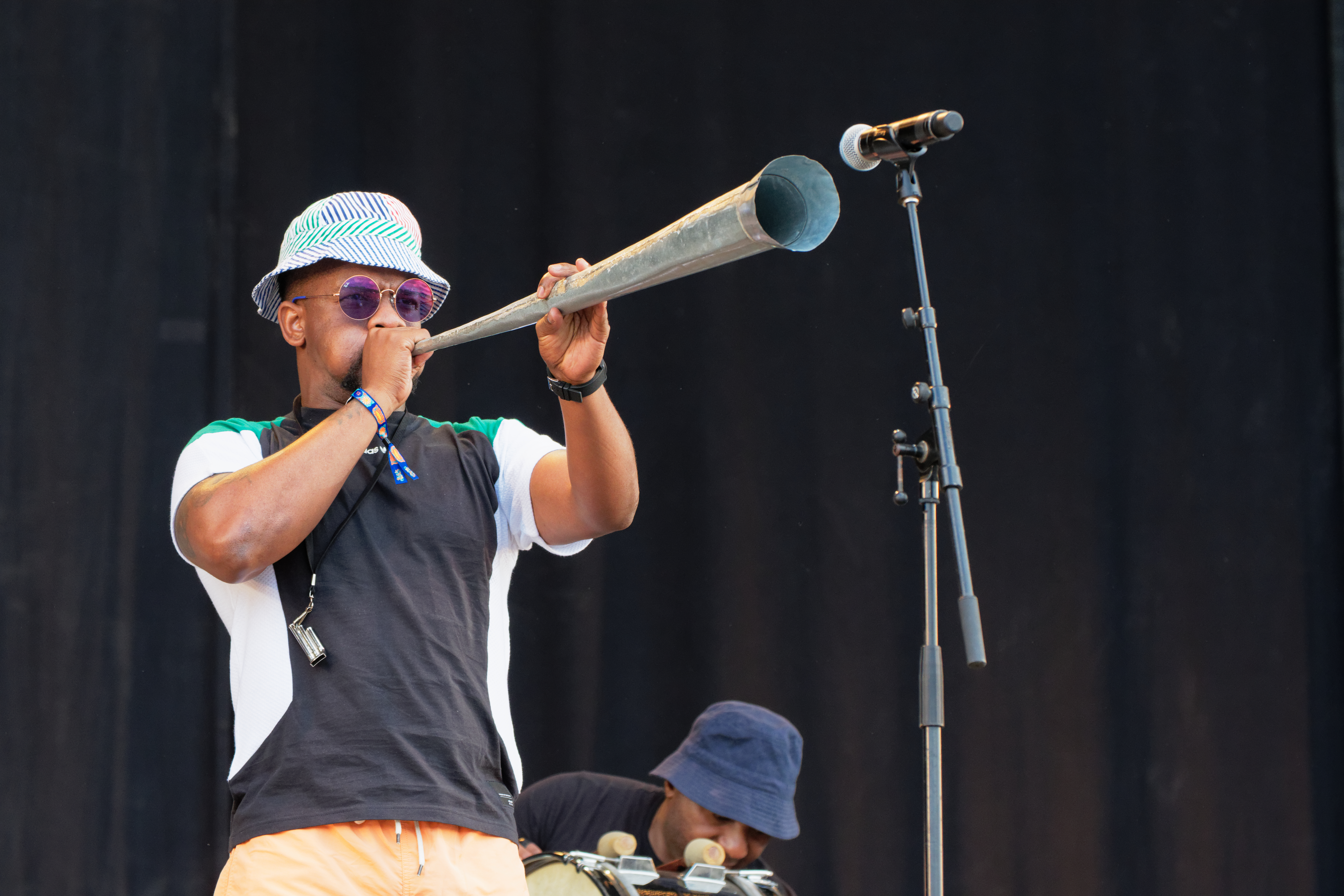

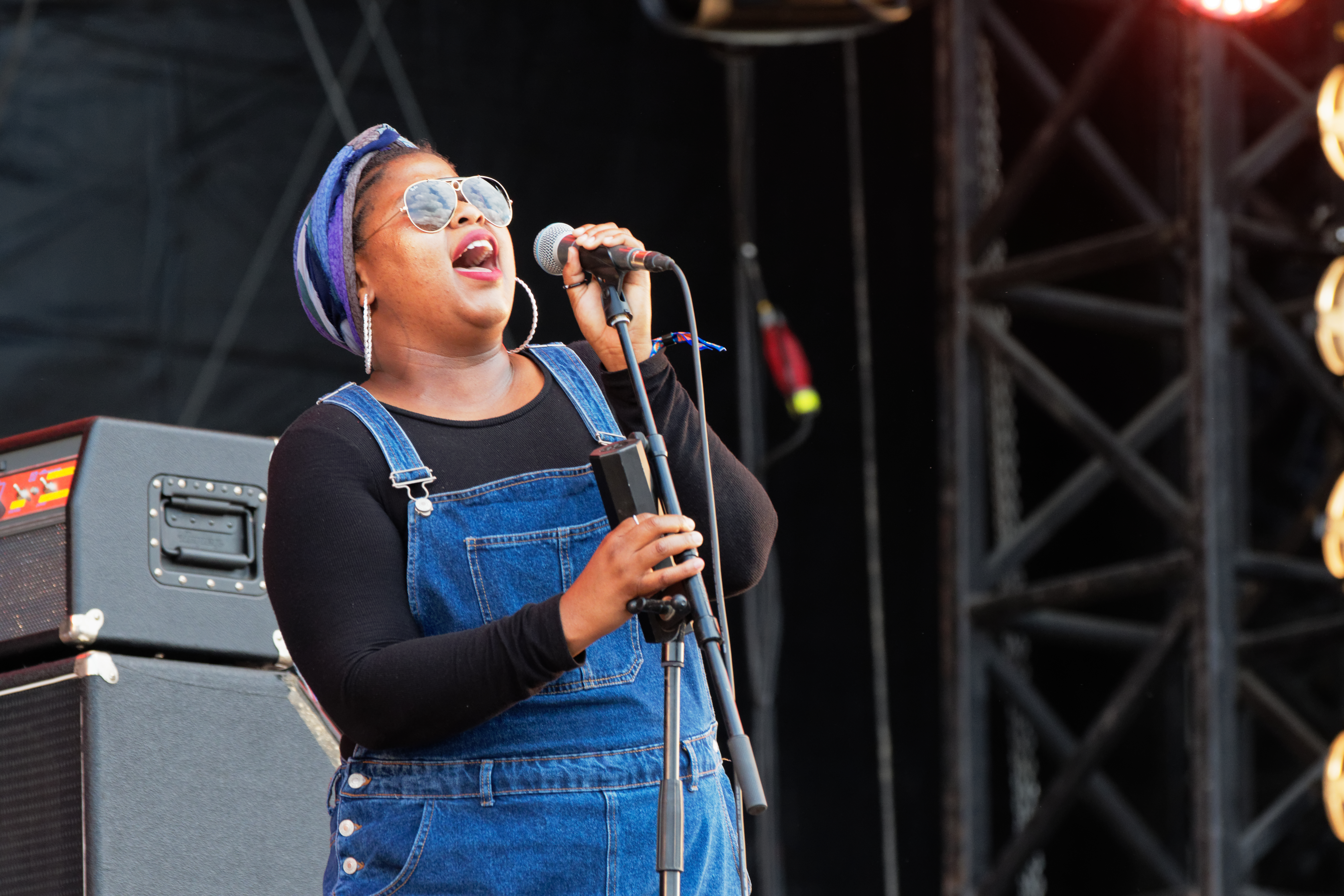

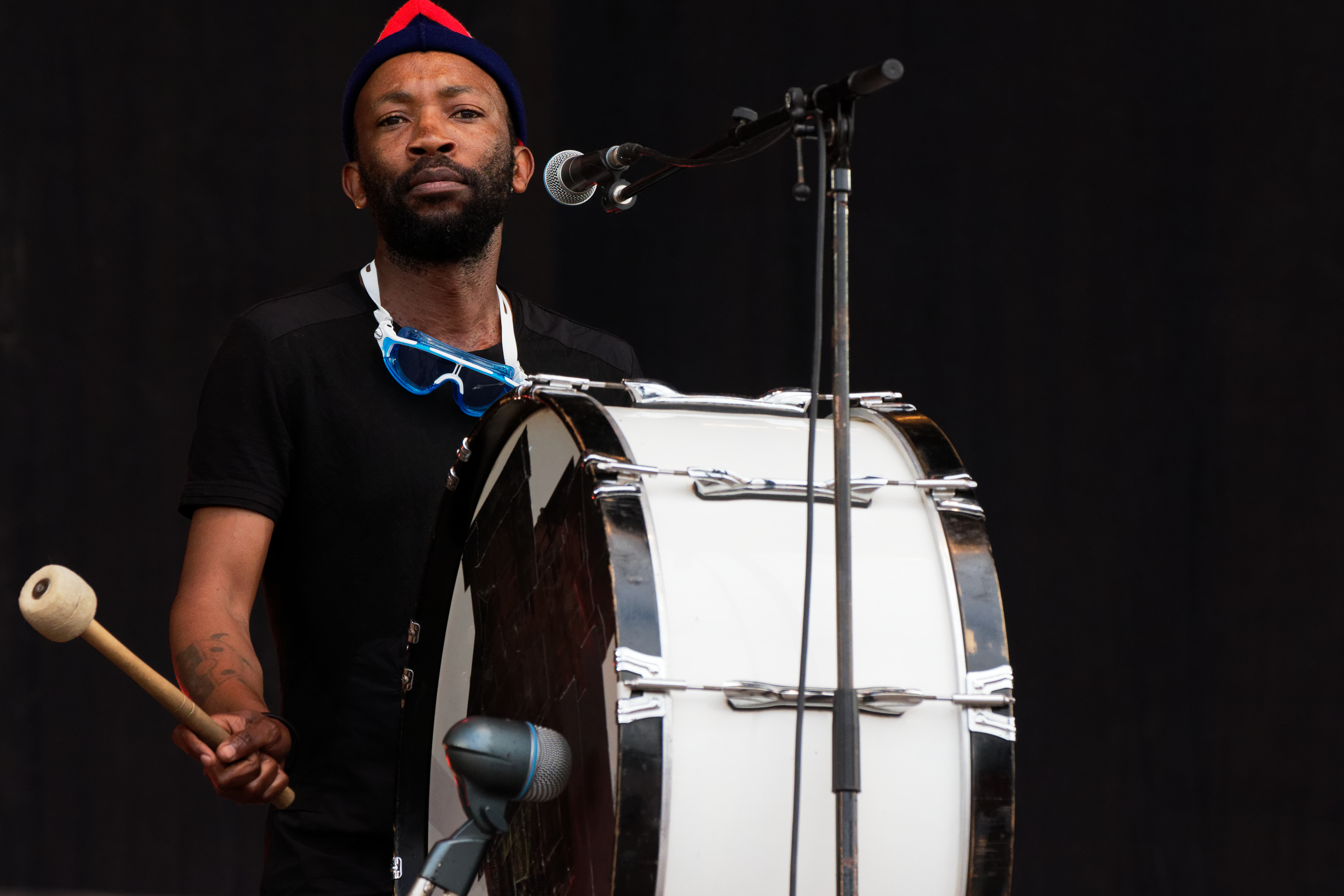

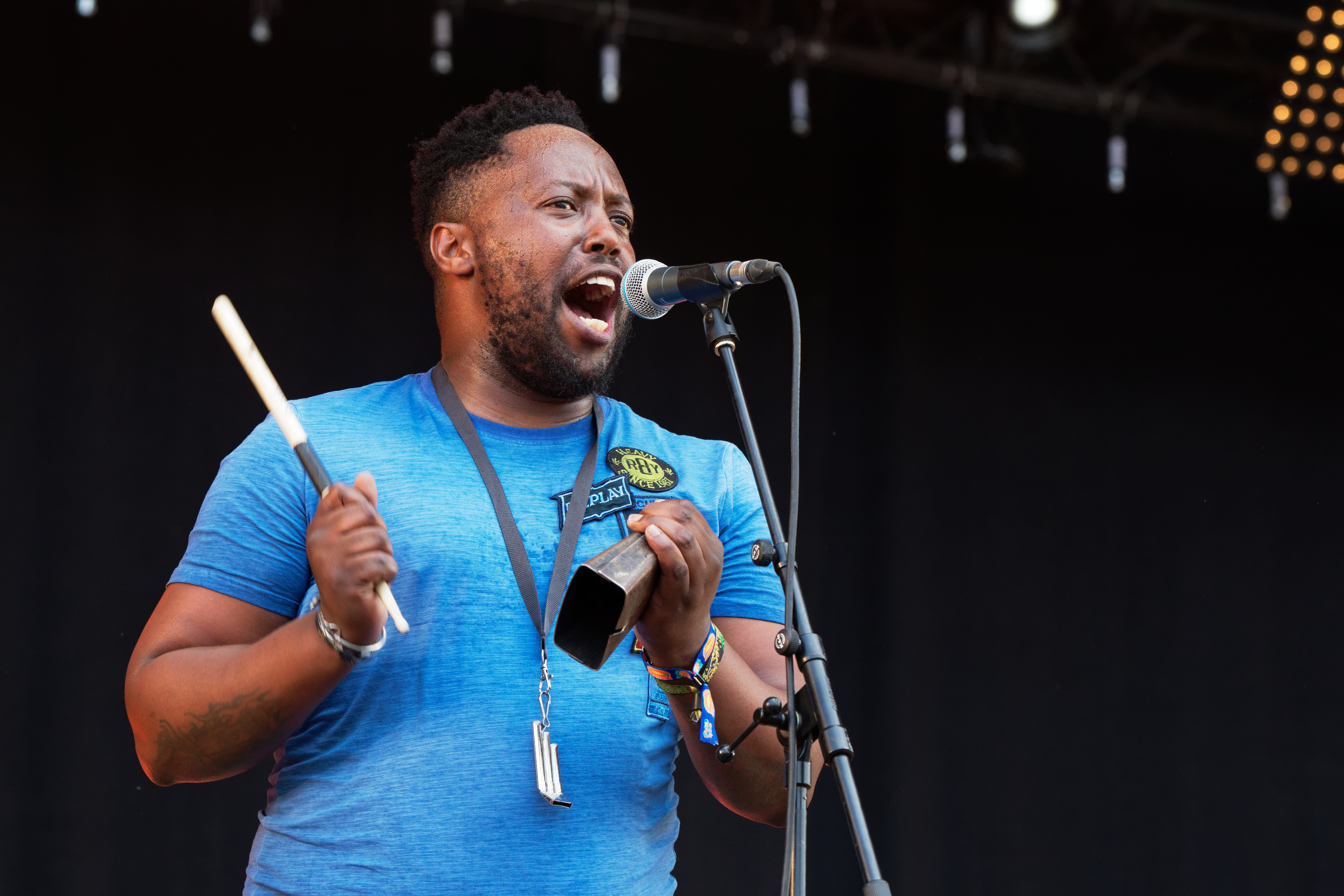

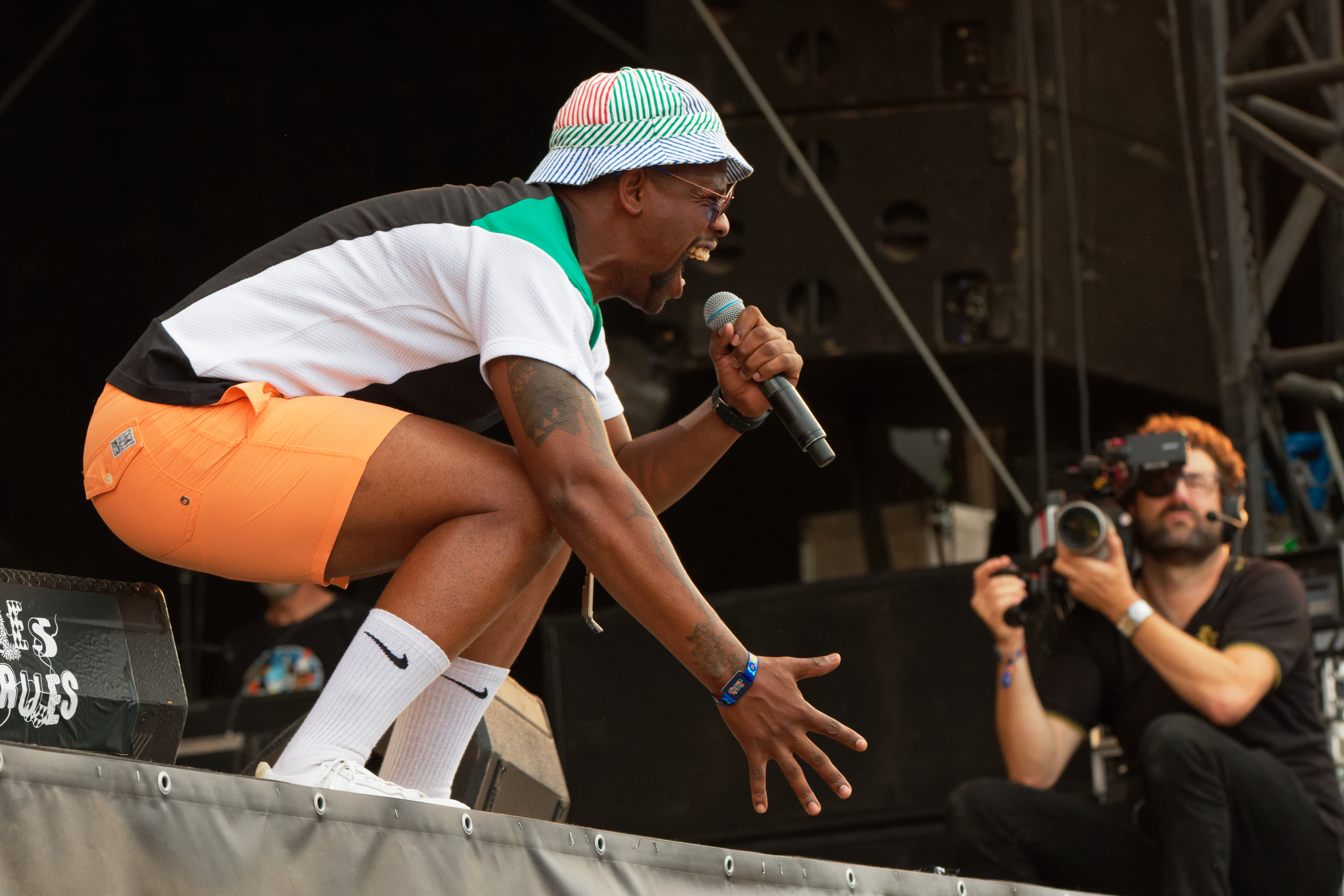
