= Eefje de Visser =

Dutch singer/songwriter (born 1986)

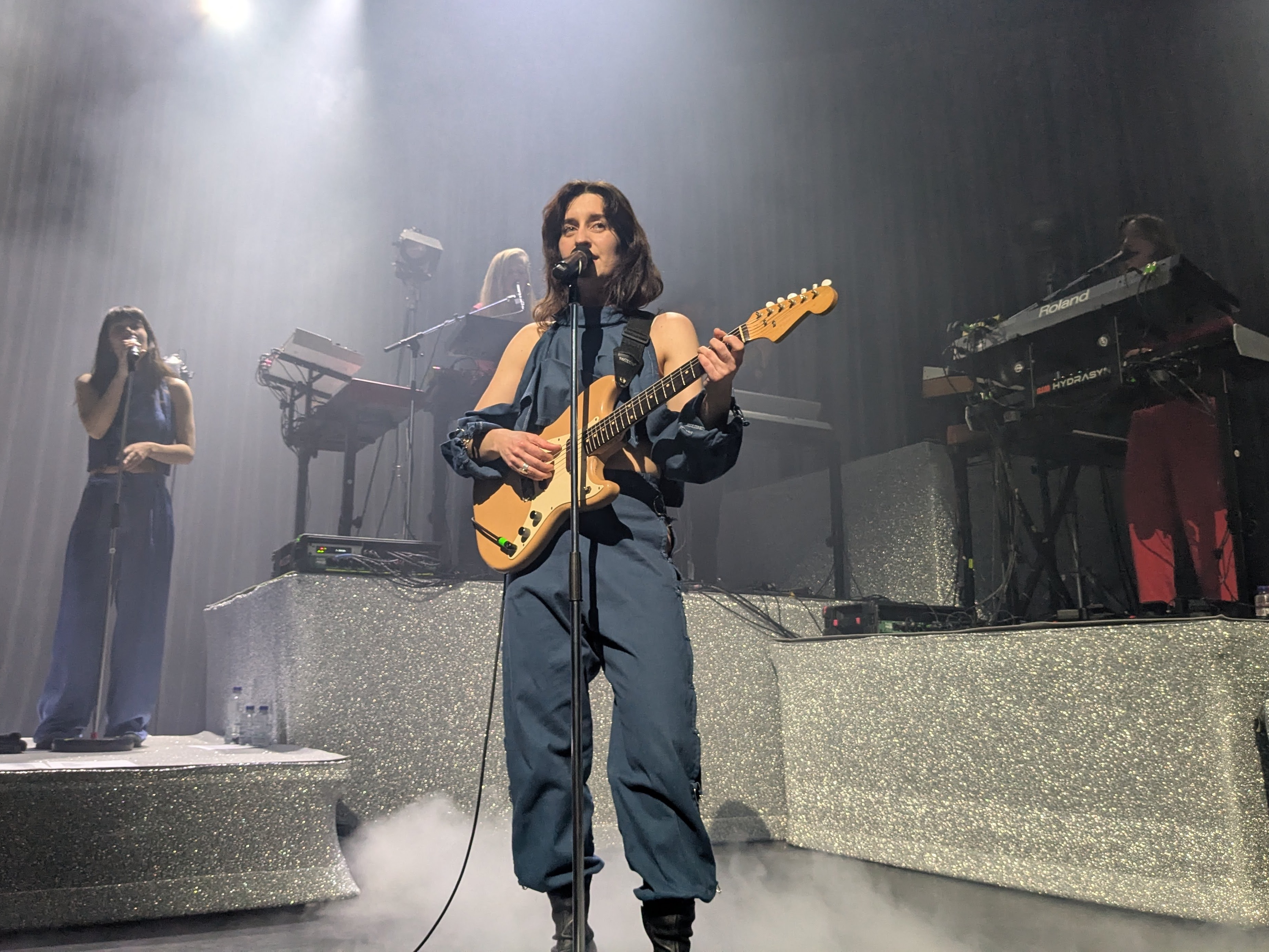
- Eefje de Visser performing at De Oosterpoort in Groningen (2026)

Background information
- Born: 8 February 1986 (age 40); Voorburg, Netherlands
- Occupation: Singer-songwriter
- Years active: 2009–present
- Website: eefjedevisser.com

Eefje de Visser (born 8 February 1986) is a Dutch singer-songwriter. She won the Grote Prijs van Nederland, a national competition for musicians, in 2009. She released her first album, De Koek, in 2011, a breakthrough year in which she performed (accompanied by a four-man band called Most Unpleasant Men) at three major Dutch festivals: the Oerol Festival, Lowlands, and the Uitmarkt.

On 14 December 2015 Eefje de Visser released a new song, "Scheef", on YouTube. The album Nachtlicht followed the next year. In 2020 she released her fourth album Bitterzoet, followed by a European tour supporting Balthazar.

== Personal life ==
De Visser is married to Pieterjan Coppejans, who is also her sound engineer and has co-produced her work starting with Bitterzoet. Their son Pablo was born in 2021. They currently reside in the Belgian city of Ghent. She is bisexual.

== Discography ==
=== Albums ===
Title	Album details	Peak chart positions		
Title	Album details	NLD	BEL (FL)	GRE
De Koek	Released: 15 January 2011; Label: Eefjes Platenmaatschappijtje; Formats: LP, CD, digital download	35	—	—
Het Is	Released: 7 September 2013; Label: Eefjes Platenmaatschappijtje, Rough Trade; Formats: LP, CD, digital download	3	67	—
Nachtlicht	Released: 8 January 2016; Label: Eefjes Platenmaatschappijtje, Rough Trade; Formats: LP, CD, digital download	8	13	—
Bitterzoet	Released: 24 January 2020; Label: Eefjes Platenmaatschappijtje, Sony; Formats: LP, CD, digital download	3	1	—
Bitterzoet – Live	Released: 1 December 2023; Label: Eefjes Platenmaatschappijtje, Sony; Formats: LP, CD, digital download	37	53	—
Heimwee	Released: 13 September 2024; Label: Eefjes Platenmaatschappijtje, Sony; Formats: LP, CD, digital download	4	1	27
Vlijmscherp	Released: 10 October 2025; Label: Eefjes Platenmaatschappijtje, Sony; Formats: LP, CD, digital download	7	7	—
Live at Best Kept Secret	Released: 18 April 2026; Label: Eefjes Platenmaatschappijtje, Sony; Formats: LP, digital download	95	47	—
"—" denotes an album that did not chart or was not released in that territory.
