= Do You Love Me (disambiguation) =

"Do You Love Me" is a 1962 hit song by The Contours.

Do You Love Me may also refer to:

== Film and television ==
- Do You Love Me (film), a 1946 film starring Maureen O'Hara
- "Do You Love Me?" (Neon Genesis Evangelion)
- "Do You Love Me?", an episode of the 2006 TV series Robin Hood

== Music ==
- Do You Love Me (Now That I Can Dance), an album by The Contours

=== Songs ===
- "Do You Love Me?" (Fiddler on the Roof song), a song from the 1964 Broadway musical Fiddler on the Roof
- "Do You Love Me?" (Sharif Dean song), 1972
- "Do You Love Me" (Patti Austin song), 1981
- "(Do You Love Me) Just Say Yes", a song by Highway 101 from their 1988 album 101²
- "Do You Love Me?" (Nick Cave and the Bad Seeds song), 1994
- "Do You Love Me?" (Amanda Jenssen song), 2008
- "Do You Love Me" (2NE1 song), 2013
- "Do You Love Me" (Jay Sean song), 2017
- "Do You Love Me", a song by Chuck Berry first released on Chuck Berry's Golden Decade Volume 3
- "Do You Love Me?", a song by Kiss from their 1976 album Destroyer
- "Do You Love Me", a song written by Maceo Parker and Michael Rucska on Maceo Parker's 1991 album Funk Overload
- "Do you love me?", a song from the 1997 video game Beatmania 2ndMIX by Reo Nagumo
- "Do You Love Me?", a song by Guster from their 2010 album Easy Wonderful
- "Do You Love Me?", a song by Death from their 2016 album reissue Scream Bloody Gore
- "Do You Love Me", a song from the 2020 film Baaghi 3.

== See also ==
- Restoration of Peter
