= List of number one hits in Belgium (1973) =

This is a list of the singles that topped the Ultratop 50 in the Flanders region of Belgium in 1973.

Issue date	Song	Artist
6 January	"Crazy Horses"	The Osmonds
13 January	"Crazy Horses"	The Osmonds
20 January	"Crazy Horses"	The Osmonds
27 January	"Crazy Horses"	The Osmonds
3 February	"Crazy Horses"	The Osmonds
10 February	"Clap Your Hands and Stamp Your Feet"	Bonnie St. Claire & Unit Gloria
17 February	"Clap Your Hands and Stamp Your Feet"	Bonnie St. Claire & Unit Gloria
24 February	"Clap Your Hands and Stamp Your Feet"	Bonnie St. Claire & Unit Gloria
3 March	"Bianca"	Freddy Breck
10 March	"Bianca"	Freddy Breck
17 March	"Bianca"	Freddy Breck
24 March	"Bianca"	Freddy Breck
31 March	"Bianca"	Freddy Breck
7 April	"Bianca"	Freddy Breck
14 April	"Forever and Ever"	Demis Roussos
21 April	"Forever and Ever"	Demis Roussos
28 April	"Forever and Ever"	Demis Roussos
5 May	"Forever and Ever"	Demis Roussos
12 May	"Forever and Ever"	Demis Roussos
19 May	"Forever and Ever"	Demis Roussos
26 May	"Tie a Yellow Ribbon Round the Ole Oak Tree"	Tony Orlando and Dawn
2 June	"Tie a Yellow Ribbon Round the Ole Oak Tree"	Tony Orlando and Dawn
9 June	"Tie a Yellow Ribbon Round the Ole Oak Tree"	Tony Orlando and Dawn
16 June	"Tie a Yellow Ribbon Round the Ole Oak Tree"	Tony Orlando and Dawn
23 June	"Tie a Yellow Ribbon Round the Ole Oak Tree"	Tony Orlando and Dawn
30 June	"We Were All Wounded at Wounded Knee"	Redbone
7 July	"We Were All Wounded at Wounded Knee"	Redbone
14 July	"We Were All Wounded at Wounded Knee"	Redbone
21 July	"We Were All Wounded at Wounded Knee"	Redbone
28 July	"We Were All Wounded at Wounded Knee"	Redbone
4 August	"Goodbye My Love Goodbye"	Demis Roussos
11 August	"Goodbye My Love Goodbye"	Demis Roussos
18 August	"Goodbye My Love Goodbye"	Demis Roussos
25 August	"Rote Rosen"	Freddy Breck
1 September	"Rote Rosen"	Freddy Breck
8 September	"Rote Rosen"	Freddy Breck
15 September	"Rote Rosen"	Freddy Breck
22 September	"Hurt"	Bobby Vinton
29 September	"Hurt"	Bobby Vinton
6 October	"My Friend the Wind"	Demis Roussos
13 October	"My Friend the Wind"	Demis Roussos
20 October	"My Friend the Wind"	Demis Roussos
27 October	"My Friend the Wind"	Demis Roussos
3 November	"My Friend the Wind"	Demis Roussos
10 November	"My Friend the Wind"	Demis Roussos
17 November	"Angie"	The Rolling Stones
24 November	"Schones Madchen aus Arcadia"	Demis Roussos
1 December	"Schones Madchen aus Arcadia"	Demis Roussos
8 December	"Schones Madchen aus Arcadia"	Demis Roussos
15 December	"Schones Madchen aus Arcadia"	Demis Roussos
22 December	"Schones Madchen aus Arcadia"	Demis Roussos
29 December	"Juanita"	Nick MacKenzie

== 1973 Year-End Chart ==
=== Singles ===
Pos.	Title	Artist	Peak
1	"Rote Rosen"	Freddy Breck	1
2	"Do You Love Me"	Sharif Dean	2
3	"Tie a Yellow Ribbon Round the Ole Oak Tree"	Tony Orlando and Dawn	1
4	"Verboden dromen"	Will Tura	2
5	"Forever and Ever"	Demis Roussos	1
6	"Goodbye My Love"	Demis Roussos	1
7	"Bianca"	Freddy Breck	1
8	"My Friend the Wind"	Demis Roussos	1
9	"Hurt"	Bobby Vinton	1
10	"We Were All Wounded at Wounded Knee"	Redbone	1

== See also ==
- 1973 in music
