= List of Ultratop 50 number-one singles of 2016 =

These hits topped the Ultratop 50 in 2016.

Flanders
Issue date	Song	Artist
2 January	"Hello"	Adele
9 January	"Hello"	Adele
16 January	"Hello"	Adele
23 January	"Fortune Cookie"	Emma Bale featuring Milow
30 January	"7 Years"	Lukas Graham
6 February	"7 Years"	Lukas Graham
13 February	"7 Years"	Lukas Graham
20 February	"7 Years"	Lukas Graham
27 February	"7 Years"	Lukas Graham
5 March	"7 Years"	Lukas Graham
12 March	"7 Years"	Lukas Graham
19 March	"Be the One"	Dua Lipa
26 March	"7 Years"	Lukas Graham
2 April	"7 Years"	Lukas Graham
9 April	"7 Years"	Lukas Graham
16 April	"I Took a Pill in Ibiza"	Mike Posner
23 April	"I Took a Pill in Ibiza"	Mike Posner
30 April	"I Took a Pill in Ibiza"	Mike Posner
7 May	"One Dance"	Drake featuring Wizkid and Kyla
14 May	"One Dance"	Drake featuring Wizkid and Kyla
21 May	"One Dance"	Drake featuring Wizkid and Kyla
28 May	"Can't Stop the Feeling!"	Justin Timberlake
4 June	"Can't Stop the Feeling!"	Justin Timberlake
11 June	"Can't Stop the Feeling!"	Justin Timberlake
18 June	"Can't Stop the Feeling!"	Justin Timberlake
25 June	"Can't Stop the Feeling!"	Justin Timberlake
2 July	"Can't Stop the Feeling!"	Justin Timberlake
9 July	"Can't Stop the Feeling!"	Justin Timberlake
16 July	"Can't Stop the Feeling!"	Justin Timberlake
23 July	"Can't Stop the Feeling!"	Justin Timberlake
30 July	"Can't Stop the Feeling!"	Justin Timberlake
6 August	"Can't Stop the Feeling!"	Justin Timberlake
13 August	"Beautiful Life"	Lost Frequencies featuring Sandro Cavazza
20 August	"Can't Stop the Feeling!"	Justin Timberlake
27 August	"Can't Stop the Feeling!"	Justin Timberlake
3 September	"Sofia"	Álvaro Soler
10 September	"Can't Stop the Feeling!"	Justin Timberlake
17 September	"Closer"	The Chainsmokers featuring Halsey
24 September	"Closer"	The Chainsmokers featuring Halsey
1 October	"Closer"	The Chainsmokers featuring Halsey
8 October	"Closer"	The Chainsmokers featuring Halsey
15 October	"Closer"	The Chainsmokers featuring Halsey
22 October	"Closer"	The Chainsmokers featuring Halsey
29 October	"Human"	Rag'n'Bone Man
5 November	"Human"	Rag'n'Bone Man
12 November	"Human"	Rag'n'Bone Man
19 November	"What Is Love 2016"	Lost Frequencies
26 November	"What Is Love 2016"	Lost Frequencies
3 December	"Human"	Rag'n'Bone Man
10 December	"What Is Love 2016"	Lost Frequencies
17 December	"Human"	Rag'n'Bone Man
24 December	"Hey Baby"	Dimitri Vegas & Like Mike vs. Diplo featuring Deb's Daughter
31 December	"Human"	Rag'n'Bone Man

Ranking of most weeks at number 1

Position	Artist	Weeks #1
1	Justin Timberlake	14
2	Lukas Graham	11
3	The Chainsmokers	6
3	Halsey	6
3	Rag'n'Bone Man	6
4	Lost Frequencies	4
5	Adele	3
5	Drake	3
5	Wizkid (as featuring)	3
5	Kyla (as featuring)	3
5	Mike Posner	3
6	Dua Lipa	1
6	Emma Bale	1
6	Milow	1
6	Sandro Cavazza (as featuring)	1
6	Álvaro Soler	1
6	Dimitri Vegas & Like Mike	1
6	Diplo	1
6	Deb's Daughter	1

Wallonia
Issue date	Song	Artist
2 January	"Hello"	Adele
9 January	"Hello"	Adele
16 January	"Hello"	Adele
23 January	"Hello"	Adele
30 January	"Hello"	Adele
6 February	"Hello"	Adele
13 February	"Hello"	Adele
20 February	"Hello"	Adele
27 February	"Hello"	Adele
5 March	"Work"	Rihanna featuring Drake
12 March	"Hundred Miles"	Yall featuring Gabriela Richardson
19 March	"Hundred Miles"	Yall featuring Gabriela Richardson
26 March	"Hundred Miles"	Yall featuring Gabriela Richardson
2 April	"Faded"	Alan Walker
9 April	"Faded"	Alan Walker
16 April	"Faded"	Alan Walker
23 April	"Faded"	Alan Walker
30 April	"I Took a Pill in Ibiza"	Mike Posner
7 May	"I Took a Pill in Ibiza"	Mike Posner
14 May	"Cheap Thrills"	Sia featuring Sean Paul
21 May	"I Took a Pill in Ibiza"	Mike Posner
28 May	"I Took a Pill in Ibiza"	Mike Posner
4 June	"This Girl"	Kungs vs. Cookin' on 3 Burners
11 June	"This Girl"	Kungs vs. Cookin' on 3 Burners
18 June	"This Girl"	Kungs vs. Cookin' on 3 Burners
25 June	"This Girl"	Kungs vs. Cookin' on 3 Burners
2 July	"This Girl"	Kungs vs. Cookin' on 3 Burners
9 July	"This Girl"	Kungs vs. Cookin' on 3 Burners
16 July	"This Girl"	Kungs vs. Cookin' on 3 Burners
23 July	"This Girl"	Kungs vs. Cookin' on 3 Burners
30 July	"This Girl"	Kungs vs. Cookin' on 3 Burners
6 August	"Can't Stop the Feeling!"	Justin Timberlake
13 August	"Can't Stop the Feeling!"	Justin Timberlake
20 August	"Can't Stop the Feeling!"	Justin Timberlake
27 August	"Can't Stop the Feeling!"	Justin Timberlake
3 September	"This Girl"	Kungs vs. Cookin' on 3 Burners
10 September	"This Girl"	Kungs vs. Cookin' on 3 Burners
17 September	"Beautiful Life"	Lost Frequencies featuring Sandro Cavazza
24 September	"Beautiful Life"	Lost Frequencies featuring Sandro Cavazza
1 October	"Cold Water"	Major Lazer featuring Justin Bieber and MØ
8 October	"Beautiful Life"	Lost Frequencies featuring Sandro Cavazza
15 October	"Aloha"	Møme featuring Merryn Jeann
22 October	"Lost on You"	LP
29 October	"Lost on You"	LP
5 November	"Lost on You"	LP
12 November	"The Greatest"	Sia featuring Kendrick Lamar
19 November	"The Greatest"	Sia featuring Kendrick Lamar
26 November	"Human"	Rag'n'Bone Man
3 December	"Starboy"	The Weeknd featuring Daft Punk
10 December	"Starboy"	The Weeknd featuring Daft Punk
17 December	"Lost on You"	LP
24 December	"Starboy"	The Weeknd featuring Daft Punk
31 December	"Human"	Rag'n'Bone Man

Ranking of most weeks at number 1

Position	Artist	Weeks #1
1	Kungs	11
1	Cookin' on 3 Burners	11
2	Adele	9
3	Alan Walker	4
3	Mike Posner	4
3	Justin Timberlake	4
3	LP	4
4	Yall	3
4	Gabriela Richardson (as featuring)	3
4	Lost Frequencies	3
4	Sandro Cavazza (as featuring)	3
4	Sia	3
4	The Weeknd	3
4	Daft Punk (as featuring)	3
5	Kendrick Lamar	2
5	Rag'n'Bone Man	2
6	Rihanna	1
6	Drake (as featuring)	1
6	Sean Paul (as featuring)	1
6	Major Lazer	1
6	Justin Bieber as featuring)	1
6	MØ (as featuring)	1
6	Møme	1
6	Merryn Jeann	1

== See also ==
- 2016 in music
