= List of number-one albums of 2019 (Belgium) =

The Belgian Albums Chart, divided into the two main regions Flanders and Wallonia, ranks the best-performing albums in Belgium, as compiled by Ultratop.

== Flanders ==
Issue date	Album	Artist	Reference
5 January	Dertig	Niels Destadsbader	
12 January	Dertig	Niels Destadsbader	
19 January	Dertig	Niels Destadsbader	
26 January	Dertig	Niels Destadsbader	
2 February	Fever	Balthazar	
9 February	Fever	Balthazar	
16 February	Thank U, Next	Ariana Grande	
23 February	Thank U, Next	Ariana Grande	
2 March	A Star Is Born	Lady Gaga and Bradley Cooper	
9 March	Wie Is Guy?	Zwangere Guy	
16 March	A Star Is Born	Lady Gaga and Bradley Cooper	
23 March	#LikeMe – Seizoen 1	#LikeMe Cast	
30 March	#LikeMe – Seizoen 1	#LikeMe Cast	
6 April	When We All Fall Asleep, Where Do We Go?	Billie Eilish	
13 April	#LikeMe – Seizoen 1	#LikeMe Cast	
20 April	#LikeMe – Seizoen 1	#LikeMe Cast	
27 April	#LikeMe – Seizoen 1	#LikeMe Cast	
4 May	Hurts 2B Human	Pink	
11 May	When We All Fall Asleep, Where Do We Go?	Billie Eilish	
18 May	When We All Fall Asleep, Where Do We Go?	Billie Eilish	
25 May	Rammstein	Rammstein	
1 June	Rammstein	Rammstein	
8 June	Liefde voor muziek (2019)	Various artists	
15 June	Tim	Avicii	
22 June	Western Stars	Bruce Springsteen	
29 June	Rammstein	Rammstein	
6 July	Rammstein	Rammstein	
13 July	Rammstein	Rammstein	
20 July	No.6 Collaborations Project	Ed Sheeran	
27 July	No.6 Collaborations Project	Ed Sheeran	
3 August	No.6 Collaborations Project	Ed Sheeran	
10 August	Rewind, Replay, Rebound	Volbeat	
17 August	We Are Not Your Kind	Slipknot	
24 August	When We All Fall Asleep, Where Do We Go?	Billie Eilish	
31 August	Lover	Taylor Swift	
7 September	Fear Inoculum	Tool	
14 September	Hollywood's Bleeding	Post Malone	
21 September	Hollywood's Bleeding	Post Malone	
28 September	Hollywood's Bleeding	Post Malone	
5 October	Abbey Road	The Beatles	
12 October	Ghosteen	Nick Cave and the Bad Seeds	
19 October	Abbey Road	The Beatles	
26 October	Boven de wolken	Niels Destadsbader	
2 November	Boven de wolken	Niels Destadsbader	
9 November	Boven de wolken	Niels Destadsbader	
16 November	Tweesprong	Clouseau	
23 November	Dromen	K3	
30 November	Everyday Life	Coldplay	
7 December	Thanks for the Dance	Leonard Cohen	
14 December	Brutaal	Zwangere Guy	
21 December	Boven de wolken	Niels Destadsbader	
28 December	Boven de wolken	Niels Destadsbader	

== Wallonia ==
Issue date	Album	Artist	Reference
5 January	Mon pays c'est l'amour	Johnny Hallyday	
12 January	Brol	Angèle	
19 January	Brol	Angèle	
26 January	Brol	Angèle	
2 February	Brol	Angèle	
9 February	Brol	Angèle	
16 February	Brol	Angèle	
23 February	Brol	Angèle	
2 March	Brol	Angèle	
9 March	Brol	Angèle	
16 March	Le monde des Enfoirés	Les Enfoirés	
23 March	Le monde des Enfoirés	Les Enfoirés	
30 March	Destin	Ninho	
6 April	Destin	Ninho	
13 April	Deux frères	PNL	
20 April	Chocolat	Roméo Elvis	
27 April	Chocolat	Roméo Elvis	
4 May	Pyramide	M. Pokora	
11 May	Pyramide	M. Pokora	
18 May	Pyramide	M. Pokora	
25 May	Rammstein	Rammstein	
1 June	Rammstein	Rammstein	
8 June	Brol	Angèle	
15 June	Les étoiles vagabondes	Nekfeu	
22 June	Les étoiles vagabondes	Nekfeu	
29 June	Les étoiles vagabondes	Nekfeu	
6 July	Les étoiles vagabondes	Nekfeu	
13 July	Brol	Angèle	
20 July	No.6 Collaborations Project	Ed Sheeran	
27 July	Brol	Angèle	
3 August	Brol	Angèle	
10 August	Brol	Angèle	
17 August	We Are Not Your Kind	Slipknot	
24 August	Brol	Angèle	
31 August	VersuS	Vitaa and Slimane	
7 September	VersuS	Vitaa and Slimane	
14 September	Mr Sal	Niska	
21 September	Puisque c'est écrit	Jean-Baptiste Guegan	
28 September	VersuS	Vitaa and Slimane	
5 October	VersuS	Vitaa and Slimane	
12 October	VersuS	Vitaa and Slimane	
19 October	Ce monde est cruel	Vald	
26 October	Live 2019	Mylène Farmer	
2 November	Johnny	Johnny Hallyday	
9 November	Johnny	Johnny Hallyday	
16 November	Les vieilles canailles: L'album live	Jacques Dutronc, Johnny Hallyday and Eddy Mitchell	
23 November	Courage	Celine Dion	
30 November	Everyday Life	Coldplay	
7 December	Les mômes et les enfants d'abord	Renaud	
14 December	Brol	Angèle	
21 December	Brol	Angèle	
28 December	Brol	Angèle	

== See also ==
- List of Ultratop 50 number-one singles of 2019
