= List of number one hits in Belgium (1975) =

These hits topped the Ultratop 50 in the Flanders region of Belgium in 1975.

| Issue date | Song | Artist |
|---|---|---|
| 4 January | "Lonely This Christmas" | Mud |
| 11 January | "Lonely This Christmas" | Mud |
| 18 January | "Lonely This Christmas" | Mud |
| 25 January | "Juke Box Jive" | The Rubettes |
| 1 February | "I Can Help" | Billy Swan |
| 8 February | "I Can Help" | Billy Swan |
| 15 February | "I Can Help" | Billy Swan |
| 22 February | "I Can Help" | Billy Swan |
| 1 March | "Sugar Candy Kisses" | Mac and Katie Kissoon |
| 8 March | "Sugar Candy Kisses" | Mac and Katie Kissoon |
| 15 March | "100 Years" | Joey Dyser |
| 22 March | "100 Years" | Joey Dyser |
| 29 March | "Down Down" | Status Quo |
| 5 April | "Shame Shame Shame" | Shirley and Company |
| 12 April | "Shame Shame Shame" | Shirley and Company |
| 19 April | "Hey mal yo" | Johnny and Orquesta Rodrigues |
| 26 April | "Hey mal yo" | Johnny and Orquesta Rodrigues |
| 3 May | "Paloma Blanca" | George Baker Selection |
| 10 May | "Paloma Blanca" | George Baker Selection |
| 17 May | "Paloma Blanca" | George Baker Selection |
| 24 May | "Love Is All" | Roger Glover and guests |
| 31 May | "Love Is All" | Roger Glover and guests |
| 7 June | "Love Is All" | Roger Glover and guests |
| 14 June | "Love Is All" | Roger Glover and guests |
| 21 June | "Swing Your Daddy" | Jim Gilstrap |
| 28 June | "Swing Your Daddy" | Jim Gilstrap |
| 5 July | "If You Go" | Barry and Eileen |
| 12 July | "If You Go" | Barry and Eileen |
| 19 July | "If You Go" | Barry and Eileen |
| 26 July | "S.O.S." | ABBA |
| 2 August | "Stand By Your Man" | Tammy Wynette |
| 9 August | "Stand By Your Man" | Tammy Wynette |
| 16 August | "Stand By Your Man" | Tammy Wynette |
| 23 August | "The Elephant Song" | Kamahl |
| 30 August | "The Elephant Song" | Kamahl |
| 6 September | "The Elephant Song" | Kamahl |
| 13 September | "The Elephant Song" | Kamahl |
| 20 September | "The Elephant Song" | Kamahl |
| 27 September | "Kiss Me Kiss Your Baby" | Brotherhood of Man |
| 4 October | "Kiss Me Kiss Your Baby" | Brotherhood of Man |
| 11 October | "Kiss Me Kiss Your Baby" | Brotherhood of Man |
| 18 October | "Kiss Me Kiss Your Baby" | Brotherhood of Man |
| 25 October | "Kiss Me Kiss Your Baby" | Brotherhood of Man |
| 1 November | "Guus" | Alexander Curly |
| 8 November | "L'L'Lucy" | Mud |
| 15 November | "L'L'Lucy" | Mud |
| 22 November | "Morning Sky" | George Baker Selection |
| 29 November | "Morning Sky" | George Baker Selection |
| 6 December | "I'm On Fire" | 5000 Volts |
| 13 December | "I'm On Fire" | 5000 Volts |
| 20 December | "I'm On Fire" | 5000 Volts |
| 27 December | "I'm On Fire" | 5000 Volts |

== 1975 Year-End Chart ==
=== Singles ===
| Pos. | Title | Artist | Peak |
|---|---|---|---|
| 1 | "Paloma Blanca" | George Baker Selection | 1 |
| 2 | "Dolannes Melodie" | Paul de Senneville & Olivier Toussaint | 4 |
| 3 | "If You Go" | Barry & Eileen | 1 |
| 4 | "I Can Help" | Billy Swan | 1 |
| 5 | "Lady In Blue" | Joe Dolan | 2 |
| 6 | "Kiss Me Kiss Your Baby" | Brotherhood of Man | 1 |
| 7 | "The Elephant Song" | Kamahl | 1 |
| 8 | "Love Is All" | Roger Glover and guests | 1 |
| 9 | "Stand By Your Man" | Tammy Wynette | 1 |
| 10 | "L'L'Lucy" | Mud | 1 |

== See also ==
- 1975 in music
