= List of number-one albums of 2017 (Belgium) =

The Belgian Albums Chart, divided into the two main regions Flanders and Wallonia, ranks the best-performing albums in Belgium, as compiled by Ultratop.

== Flanders ==
Issue date	Album	Artist	Reference
7 January	You Want It Darker	Leonard Cohen	
14 January	You Want It Darker	Leonard Cohen	
21 January	I See You	The xx	
28 January	I See You	The xx	
4 February	I See You	The xx	
11 February	Echo	Bazart	
18 February	Human	Rag'n'Bone Man	
25 February	Speeltijd	Niels Destadsbader	
4 March	Speeltijd	Niels Destadsbader	
11 March	÷	Ed Sheeran	
18 March	÷	Ed Sheeran	
25 March	÷	Ed Sheeran	
1 April	From Deewee	Soulwax	
8 April	÷	Ed Sheeran	
15 April	÷	Ed Sheeran	
22 April	÷	Ed Sheeran	
29 April	÷	Ed Sheeran	
6 May	Humanz	Gorillaz	
13 May	Humanz	Gorillaz	
20 May	Harry Styles	Harry Styles	
27 May	Sciencing	Millionaire	
3 June	Liefde voor Muziek (2017)	Various artists	
10 June	Liefde voor Muziek (2017)	Various artists	
17 June	Liefde voor Muziek (2017)	Various artists	
24 June	Liefde voor Muziek (2017)	Various artists	
1 July	Liefde voor Muziek (2017)	Various artists	
8 July	Liefde voor Muziek (2017)	Various artists	
15 July	Liefde voor Muziek (2017)	Various artists	
22 July	Liefde voor Muziek (2017)	Various artists	
29 July	One More Light	Linkin Park	
5 August	Everything Now	Arcade Fire	
12 August	Everything Now	Arcade Fire	
19 August	Everything Now	Arcade Fire	
26 August	Speeltijd	Niels Destadsbader	
2 September	A Deeper Understanding	The War on Drugs	
9 September	Clouseau30	Clouseau	
16 September	Clouseau30	Clouseau	
23 September	Concrete and Gold	Foo Fighters	
30 September	Clouseau30	Clouseau	
7 October	Infinity	Oscar and the Wolf	
14 October	Brood voor Morgenvroeg	Bart Peeters	
21 October	Beautiful Trauma	Pink	
28 October	Infinity	Oscar and the Wolf	
4 November	Infinity	Oscar and the Wolf	
11 November	The Thrill of It All	Sam Smith	
18 November	Reputation	Taylor Swift	
25 November	Love Cruise	K3	
2 December	Love Cruise	K3	
9 December	Songs of Experience	U2	
16 December	Love Cruise	K3	
23 December	Love Cruise	K3	
30 December	Love Cruise	K3	

== Wallonia ==
Issue date	Album	Artist	Reference
7 January	My Way	M. Pokora	
14 January	My Way	M. Pokora	
21 January	My Way	M. Pokora	
28 January	My Way	M. Pokora	
4 February	&	Julien Doré	
11 February	My Way	M. Pokora	
18 February	&	Julien Doré	
25 February	&	Julien Doré	
4 March	Le live	Kids United	
11 March	Mission Enfoirés	Les Enfoirés	
18 March	Mission Enfoirés	Les Enfoirés	
25 March	Spirit	Depeche Mode	
1 April	Spirit	Depeche Mode	
8 April	Selfocracy	Loïc Nottet	
15 April	Selfocracy	Loïc Nottet	
22 April	Selfocracy	Loïc Nottet	
29 April	Selfocracy	Loïc Nottet	
6 May	Ipséité	Damso	
13 May	Selfocracy	Loïc Nottet	
20 May	Selfocracy	Loïc Nottet	
27 May	Volver	Benjamin Biolay	
3 June	Sgt. Pepper's Lonely Hearts Club Band	The Beatles	
10 June	Is This the Life We Really Want?	Roger Waters	
17 June	Is This the Life We Really Want?	Roger Waters	
24 June	Truth Is a Beautiful Thing	London Grammar	
1 July	La vraie vie	Bigflo & Oli	
8 July	La vraie vie	Bigflo & Oli	
15 July	La vraie vie	Bigflo & Oli	
22 July	La vraie vie	Bigflo & Oli	
29 July	La vraie vie	Bigflo & Oli	
5 August	Everything Now	Arcade Fire	
12 August	La vraie vie	Bigflo & Oli	
19 August	La vraie vie	Bigflo & Oli	
26 August	3: Forever United	Kids United	
2 September	Liberté Chérie	Calogero	
9 September	Liberté Chérie	Calogero	
16 September	13	Indochine	
23 September	13	Indochine	
30 September	13	Indochine	
7 October	Le présent d'abord	Florent Pagny	
14 October	Le présent d'abord	Florent Pagny	
21 October	Le présent d'abord	Florent Pagny	
28 October	La fête est finie	Orelsan	
4 November	Le choix du fou	Michel Sardou	
11 November	Le choix du fou	Michel Sardou	
18 November	Le choix du fou	Michel Sardou	
25 November	On a tous quelque chose de Johnny	Various artists	
2 December	On a tous quelque chose de Johnny	Various artists	
9 December	On a tous quelque chose de Johnny	Various artists	
16 December	On a tous quelque chose de Johnny	Various artists	
23 December	On a tous quelque chose de Johnny	Various artists	
30 December	On a tous quelque chose de Johnny	Various artists	

== See also ==
- List of Ultratop 50 number-one singles of 2017
