= List of Ultratop 50 number-one singles of 2005 =

These hits topped the Ultratop 50 charts in 2005 (see 2005 in music).

Issue Date	Artist	Song
January 1	Joeri Fransen	"Ya 'bout to find out"
January 8	Joeri Fransen	"Ya 'bout to find out"
January 15	Joeri Fransen	"Ya 'bout to find out"
January 22	Artiesten Voor Tsunami 12-12	"Geef een teken" ("Give Me a Sign")
January 29	Artiesten Voor Tsunami 12-12	"Geef een teken" ("Give Me a Sign")
February 5	Artiesten Voor Tsunami 12-12	"Geef een teken" ("Give Me a Sign")
February 12	Artiesten Voor Tsunami 12-12	"Geef een teken" ("Give Me a Sign")
February 19	Artiesten Voor Tsunami 12-12	"Geef een teken" ("Give Me a Sign")
February 26	Schnappi	"Das kleine Krokodil"
March 5	Schnappi	"Das kleine Krokodil"
March 12	Schnappi	"Das kleine Krokodil"
March 19	Schnappi	"Das kleine Krokodil"
March 26	Schnappi	"Das kleine Krokodil"
April 2	Schnappi	"Das kleine Krokodil"
April 9	Schnappi	"Das kleine Krokodil"
April 16	Schnappi	"Das kleine Krokodil"
April 23	50 Cent and Olivia	"Candy Shop"
April 30	50 Cent and Olivia	"Candy Shop"
May 7	Star Academy	"Fame"
May 14	Star Academy	"Fame"
May 21	Star Academy	"Fame"
May 28	Star Academy	"Fame"
June 4	Crazy Frog	"Axel F"
June 11	Crazy Frog	"Axel F"
June 18	Crazy Frog	"Axel F"
June 25	Crazy Frog	"Axel F"
July 2	Crazy Frog	"Axel F"
July 9	Crazy Frog	"Axel F"
July 16	Crazy Frog	"Axel F"
July 23	Crazy Frog	"Axel F"
July 30	Crazy Frog	"Axel F"
August 6	Crazy Frog	"Axel F"
August 13	Crazy Frog	"Axel F"
August 20	Crazy Frog	"Axel F"
August 27	James Blunt	"You're Beautiful"
September 3	James Blunt	"You're Beautiful"
September 10	James Blunt	"You're Beautiful"
September 17	James Blunt	"You're Beautiful"
September 24	James Blunt	"You're Beautiful"
October 1	The Pussycat Dolls featuring Busta Rhymes	"Don't Cha"
October 8	The Pussycat Dolls featuring Busta Rhymes	"Don't Cha"
October 15	Bob Sinclar featuring Gary Pine	"Love Generation"
October 22	Bob Sinclar featuring Gary Pine	"Love Generation"
October 29	Bob Sinclar featuring Gary Pine	"Love Generation"
November 5	Bob Sinclar featuring Gary Pine	"Love Generation"
November 12	Bob Sinclar featuring Gary Pine	"Love Generation"
November 19	Bob Sinclar featuring Gary Pine	"Love Generation"
November 26	Madonna	"Hung Up"
December 3	Madonna	"Hung Up"
December 10	Madonna	"Hung Up"
December 17	Bob Sinclar	"Love Generation"
December 24	Bob Sinclar	"Love Generation"
December 31	Kippensoep Allstars	"Kippensoep voor iedereen"

== See also ==
- 2005 in music
