= List of number one hits in Belgium (1974) =

This is a list of the singles that topped the Ultratop 50 in the Flanders region of Belgium in 1974.

Issue date	Song	Artist
5 January	"Juanita"	Nick MacKenzie
12 January	"Juanita"	Nick MacKenzie
19 January	"Juanita"	Nick MacKenzie
26 January	"Someday Somewhere"	Demis Roussos
2 February	"Someday Somewhere"	Demis Roussos
9 February	"Dirty Ol' Man"	The Three Degrees
16 February	"Dirty Ol' Man"	The Three Degrees
23 February	"Dirty Ol' Man"	The Three Degrees
2 March	"Dirty Ol' Man"	The Three Degrees
9 March	"Dirty Ol' Man"	The Three Degrees
16 March	"Dirty Ol' Man"	The Three Degrees
23 March	"The Most Beautiful Girl"	Charlie Rich
30 March	"The Most Beautiful Girl"	Charlie Rich
6 April	"Tiger Feet"	Mud
13 April	"Tiger Feet"	Mud
20 April	"Tiger Feet"	Mud
27 April	"Tiger Feet"	Mud
4 May	"Waterloo"	ABBA
11 May	"Waterloo"	ABBA
18 May	"Waterloo"	ABBA
25 May	"Waterloo"	ABBA
1 June	"Waterloo"	ABBA
8 June	"Waterloo"	ABBA
15 June	"Be My Day"	The Cats
22 June	"Be My Day"	The Cats
29 June	"Sugar Baby Love"	The Rubettes
6 July	"Sugar Baby Love"	The Rubettes
13 July	"Sugar Baby Love"	The Rubettes
20 July	"Sugar Baby Love"	The Rubettes
27 July	"Sugar Baby Love"	The Rubettes
3 August	"Sugar Baby Love"	The Rubettes
10 August	"Sugar Baby Love"	The Rubettes
17 August	"Gigi l'amoroso (Gigi l'amour)"	Dalida
24 August	"Rock Your Baby"	George McCrae
31 August	"Rock Your Baby"	George McCrae
7 September	"Rock Your Baby"	George McCrae
14 September	"Rock Your Baby"	George McCrae
21 September	"Rock Your Baby"	George McCrae
28 September	"Rock Your Baby"	George McCrae
5 October	"Rock Your Baby"	George McCrae
12 October	"Rock Your Baby"	George McCrae
19 October	"Kung Fu Fighting"	Carl Douglas
26 October	"Kung Fu Fighting"	Carl Douglas
2 November	"Kung Fu Fighting"	Carl Douglas
9 November	"Kung Fu Fighting"	Carl Douglas
16 November	"Kung Fu Fighting"	Carl Douglas
23 November	"Kung Fu Fighting"	Carl Douglas
30 November	"Swinging On a Star"	Spooky & Sue
7 December	"Yellow Sun of Ecuador"	Classics
14 December	"Yellow Sun of Ecuador"	Classics
21 December	"Sing a Song of Love"	George Baker Selection
28 December	"Lonely This Christmas"	Mud

== 1974 Year-End Chart ==
=== Singles ===
Pos.	Title	Artist	Peak
1	"Gigi l'amoroso (Gigi l'amour)"	Dalida	1
2	"Such a Night"	Ricky Gordon	5
3	"Rock Your Baby"	George McCrae	1
4	"Sugar Baby Love"	The Rubettes	1
5	"The Most Beautiful Girl"	Charlie Rich	1
6	"Is Everybody Happy"	Jackpot	2
7	"In the Still of the Night"	Jack Jersey	2
8	"Kung Fu Fighting"	Carl Douglas	1
9	"Be My Day"	The Cats	1
10	"Dirty Ol' Man"	The Three Degrees	1

== See also ==
- 1974 in music
