= List of number one hits in Belgium (1979) =

This is a list of the singles that topped the Ultratop 50 in the Flanders region of Belgium in 1979.

Issue date	Song	Artist
6 January	"Y.M.C.A"	Village People
13 January	"Y.M.C.A"	Village People
20 January	"Y.M.C.A"	Village People
27 January	"Y.M.C.A"	Village People
3 February	"Y.M.C.A"	Village People
10 February	"Y.M.C.A"	Village People
17 February	"Y.M.C.A"	Village People
24 February	"Chiquitita"	ABBA
3 March	"Chiquitita"	ABBA
10 March	"Chiquitita"	ABBA
17 March	"Chiquitita"	ABBA
24 March	"Chiquitita"	ABBA
31 March	"Fire"	The Pointer Sisters
7 April	"Fire"	The Pointer Sisters
14 April	"Fire"	The Pointer Sisters
21 April	"In the Navy"	Village People
28 April	"In the Navy"	Village People
5 May	"In the Navy"	Village People
12 May	"In the Navy"	Village People
19 May	"Hooray! Hooray! It's a Holi-Holiday"	Boney M.
26 May	"I Want You to Want Me"	Cheap Trick
2 June	"I Want You to Want Me"	Cheap Trick
9 June	"Does Your Mother Know"	ABBA
16 June	"Bright Eyes"	Art Garfunkel
23 June	"Bright Eyes"	Art Garfunkel
30 June	"Bright Eyes"	Art Garfunkel
7 July	"Bright Eyes"	Art Garfunkel
14 July	"Bright Eyes"	Art Garfunkel
21 July	"Reunited"	Peaches and Herb
28 July	"Theme from the Deer Hunter (Cavatina)"	The Shadows
4 August	"Theme from the Deer Hunter (Cavatina)"	The Shadows
11 August	"I Was Made for Lovin' You"	Kiss
18 August	"I Was Made for Lovin' You"	Kiss
25 August	"Voulez-Vous"	ABBA
1 September	" Quiéreme Mucho"	Julio Iglesias
8 September	" Quiéreme Mucho"	Julio Iglesias
15 September	" Quiéreme Mucho"	Julio Iglesias
22 September	" Quiéreme Mucho"	Julio Iglesias
29 September	" Quiéreme Mucho"	Julio Iglesias
6 October	"We Don't Talk Anymore"	Cliff Richard
13 October	"We Don't Talk Anymore"	Cliff Richard
20 October	"A Brand New Day"	The Wiz Stars
27 October	"A Brand New Day"	The Wiz Stars
3 November	"A Brand New Day"	The Wiz Stars
10 November	"A Brand New Day"	The Wiz Stars
17 November	"We Belong to the Night"	Ellen Foley
24 November	"We Belong to the Night"	Ellen Foley
1 December	"Gimme! Gimme! Gimme! (A Man After Midnight)"	ABBA
8 December	"(Everybody) Get Up and Boogie"	Freddie James
15 December	"Weekend"	Earth and Fire
22 December	"Weekend"	Earth and Fire
29 December	"Weekend"	Earth and Fire

== 1979 Year-End Chart ==
=== Singles ===
Pos.	Title	Artist	Peak
1	"Quiereme Mucho"	Julio Iglesias	1
2	"Chiquitita"	ABBA	1
3	"I Was Made for Lovin' You"	Kiss	1
4	"Born to Be Alive"	Patrick Hernandez	2
5	"Bright Eyes"	Art Garfunkel	1
6	"Fire"	The Pointer Sisters	1
7	"In the Navy"	Village People	1
8	"Y.M.C.A."	Village People	1
9	"Theme from the Deer Hunter (Cavatina)"	The Shadows	1
10	"We Don't Talk Anymore"	Cliff Richard	1

== See also ==
- 1979 in music
