= List of Ultratop 50 number-one singles of 2004 =

These hits topped the Ultratop 50 charts in 2004 (see 2004 in music).

Issue Date	Artist	Title
January 3	The Black Eyed Peas	"Shut Up"
January 10	The Black Eyed Peas	"Shut Up"
January 17	The Black Eyed Peas	"Shut Up"
January 24	The Black Eyed Peas	"Shut Up"
January 31	The Black Eyed Peas	"Shut Up"
February 7	Marco Borsato	"Afscheid Nemen Bestaat Niet"
February 14	Kane and Tiësto	"Rain Down On Me"
February 21	Kane and Tiësto	"Rain Down On Me"
February 28	Xandee	"1 Life"
March 6	Xandee	"1 Life"
March 13	Xandee	"1 Life"
March 20	Xandee	"1 Life"
March 27	Xandee	"1 Life"
April 3	Xandee	"1 Life"
April 10	Aventura	"Obsesión"
April 17	Aventura	"Obsesión"
April 24	Aventura	"Obsesión"
May 1	Aventura	"Obsesión"
May 8	Eamon	"F**k it (I Don't Want You Back)"
May 15	Eamon	F**k it (I don't Want You Back)
May 22	Eamon	F**k it (I don't Want You Back)
May 29	Eamon	F**k it (I don't Want You Back)
June 5	Ruslana	"Wild Dances"
June 12	Ruslana	"Wild Dances"
June 19	Ruslana	"Wild Dances"
June 26	Ruslana	"Wild Dances"
July 3	Ruslana	"Wild Dances"
July 10	Ruslana	"Wild Dances"
July 17	Ruslana	"Wild Dances"
July 24	Ruslana	"Wild Dances"
July 31	Ruslana	"Wild Dances"
August 7	Ruslana	"Wild Dances"
August 14	Freestylers	"Push Up"
August 21	Freestylers	"Push Up"
August 28	Freestylers	'"Push Up"
September 4	Freestylers	"Push Up"
September 11	Freestylers	"Push Up"
September 18	Freestylers	"Push Up"
September 25	Freestylers	"Push Up"
October 2	Milk Inc.	"Whisper"
October 9	Milk Inc.	"Whisper"
October 16	André Hazes	"Zij Gelooft In Mij"
October 23	André Hazes	"Zij Gelooft In Mij"
October 30	K-Maro	"Femme like U (Donne-moi ton corps)"
November 6	K-Maro	"Femme like U (Donne-moi ton corps)"
November 13	K-Maro	"Femme like U (Donne-moi ton corps)"
November 20	K-Maro	"Femme like U (Donne-moi ton corps)"
November 27	K-Maro	"Femme like U (Donne-moi ton corps)"
December 4	Destiny's Child	"Lose My Breath"
December 11	Nâdiya and Smartzee	"Et c'est parti"
December 18	Nâdiya and Smartzee	"Et c'est parti"
December 25	Joeri Fransen	"Ya 'bout to find out"

== See also ==
- 2004 in music
