= Ultratop 50 number-one hits of 1999 =

These hits topped the Ultratop 50 in 1999.

Date	Artist	Title
January 2	Emilia	"Big Big World"
January 9	Emilia	"Big big world"
January 16	Emilia	"Big big world"
January 23	Virtual Zone	"Virtual Zone" / "Change U mind"
January 30	Virtual Zone	"Virtual Zone" / "Change U mind"
February 6	Virtual Zone	"Virtual Zone" / "Change U mind"
February 13	The Offspring	"Pretty Fly (For a White Guy)"
February 20	The Offspring	"Pretty fly (For a White Guy)"
February 27	The Offspring	"Pretty fly (For a White Guy)"
March 6	The Offspring	"Pretty fly (For a White Guy)"
March 13	Britney Spears	"...Baby One More Time"
March 20	Britney Spears	"...Baby One More Time"
March 27	Britney Spears	"...Baby One More Time"
April 3	Britney Spears	"...Baby One More Time"
April 10	Britney Spears	"...Baby One More Time"
April 17	Britney Spears	"...Baby One More Time"
April 24	Britney Spears	"...Baby One More Time"
May 1	Britney Spears	"...Baby One More Time"
May 8	Mr. Oizo	"Flat Beat"
May 15	Mr. Oizo	"Flat Beat"
May 22	Mr. Oizo	"Flat Beat"
May 29	Mr. Oizo	"Flat Beat"
June 5	Virtual Zone	"Heaven"
June 12	Shania Twain	"That Don't Impress Me Much"
June 19	Shania Twain	"That Don't Impress Me Much"
June 26	Shania Twain	"That Don't Impress Me Much"
July 3	Britney Spears	"Sometimes"
July 10	Britney Spears	"Sometimes"
July 17	Britney Spears	"Sometimes"
July 24	Ann Lee	"2 Times"
July 31	Lou Bega	"Mambo No. 5 (A little bit of...)"
August 7	Lou Bega	"Mambo No. 5 (A little bit of...)"
August 14	Lou Bega	"Mambo No. 5 (A little bit of...)"
August 21	Lou Bega	"Mambo No. 5 (A little bit of...)"
August 28	Lou Bega	"Mambo No. 5 (A little bit of...)"
September 4	Lou Bega	"Mambo No. 5 (A little bit of...)"
September 11	Eiffel 65	"Blue (Da Ba Dee)"
September 18	Eiffel 65	"Blue (Da Ba Dee)"
September 25	Eiffel 65	"Blue (Da Ba Dee)"
October 2	Eiffel 65	"Blue (Da Ba Dee)"
October 9	Christina Aguilera	"Genie in a Bottle"
October 16	DJ Peter Project	"2 New York"
October 23	DJ Peter Project	"2 New York"
October 30	Scoop	"Drop it"
November 6	Da Boy Tommy	"Halloween"
November 13	Da Boy Tommy	"Halloween"
November 20	Da Boy Tommy	"Halloween"
November 27	R. Kelly	"If I Could Turn Back the Hands of Time"
December 4	R. Kelly	"If I Could Turn Back the Hands of Time"
December 11	R. Kelly	"If I Could Turn Back the Hands of Time"
December 18	R. Kelly	"If I Could Turn Back the Hands of Time"
December 25	R. Kelly	"If I Could Turn Back the Hands of Time"

== See also ==
- 1999 in music
