= List of number one hits in Belgium (1977) =

This is a list of the singles that topped the Ultratop 50 in the Flanders region of Belgium in 1977.

Issue date	Song	Artist
1 January	"Money Money Money"	ABBA
8 January	"Upside Down"	Teach-In
15 January	"Rock and Roll Star"	Champagne
22 January	"Under the Moon of Love"	Showaddywaddy
29 January	"Under the Moon of Love"	Showaddywaddy
5 February	"Sunny"	Boney M.
12 February	"Sunny"	Boney M.
19 February	"Living Next Door to Alice"	Smokie
26 February	"Living Next Door to Alice"	Smokie
5 March	"Living Next Door to Alice"	Smokie
12 March	"Living Next Door to Alice"	Smokie
19 March	"Don't Cry for Me Argentina"	Julie Covington
26 March	"Don't Cry for Me Argentina"	Julie Covington
2 April	"Don't Cry for Me Argentina"	Julie Covington
9 April	"Don't Cry for Me Argentina"	Julie Covington
16 April	"Don't Cry for Me Argentina"	Julie Covington
23 April	"Go Your Own Way"	Fleetwood Mac
30 April	"Go Your Own Way"	Fleetwood Mac
7 May	"Lay Back in the Arms of Someone"	Smokie
14 May	"Non-Stop Dance"	The Gibson Brothers
21 May	"Non-Stop Dance"	The Gibson Brothers
28 May	"Non-Stop Dance"	The Gibson Brothers
4 June	"You're My World"	Guys 'n' Dolls
11 June	"You're My World"	Guys 'n' Dolls
18 June	"Ma Baker"	Boney M.
25 June	"Ma Baker"	Boney M.
2 July	"Ma Baker"	Boney M.
9 July	"Ma Baker"	Boney M.
16 July	"Ma Baker"	Boney M.
23 July	"Ma Baker"	Boney M.
30 July	"Yes Sir I Can Boogie"	Baccara
6 August	"Yes Sir I Can Boogie"	Baccara
13 August	"Yes Sir I Can Boogie"	Baccara
20 August	"Yes Sir I Can Boogie"	Baccara
27 August	"Yes Sir I Can Boogie"	Baccara
3 September	"I Feel Love"	Donna Summer
10 September	"I Feel Love"	Donna Summer
17 September	"Sorry, I'm a Lady"	Baccara
24 September	"I Remember Elvis Presley"	Danny Mirror
1 October	"I Remember Elvis Presley"	Danny Mirror
8 October	"I Remember Elvis Presley"	Danny Mirror
15 October	"I Remember Elvis Presley"	Danny Mirror
22 October	"Do You Remember"	Long Tall Ernie and the Shakers
29 October	"Do You Remember"	Long Tall Ernie and the Shakers
5 November	"Do You Remember"	Long Tall Ernie and the Shakers
12 November	"Do You Remember"	Long Tall Ernie and the Shakers
19 November	"Belfast"	Boney M.
26 November	"'t Smurfenlied"	Father Abraham
3 December	"'t Smurfenlied"	Father Abraham
10 December	"'t Smurfenlied"	Father Abraham
17 December	"'t Smurfenlied"	Father Abraham
24 December	"'t Smurfenlied"	Father Abraham
31 December	"A far l'amore comincia tu"	Raffaella Carra

== 1977 Year-End Chart ==
=== Singles ===
Pos.	Title	Artist	Peak
1	"Ma Baker"	Boney M	1
2	"Do You Remember"	Long Tall Ernie and the Shakers	1
3	"A Million in 1,2,3"	Dream Express	2
4	"You're My World"	Guys 'n' Dolls	1
5	"Sunny"	Boney M.	1
6	"I Feel Love"	Donna Summer	1
7	"Belfast"	Boney M.	1
8	"I Remember Elvis Presley"	Danny Mirror	1
9	"Don't Let Me Be Misunderstood"	Santa Esmeralda	2
10	"Yes Sir I Can Boogie"	Baccara	1

== See also ==
- 1977 in music
