= List of Ultratop 50 number-one singles of 2015 =

These hits topped the Ultratop 50 in 2015.

Flanders
Issue date	Song	Artist
3 January	"Are You With Me"	Lost Frequencies
10 January	"Uptown Funk"	Mark Ronson featuring Bruno Mars
17 January	"Uptown Funk"	Mark Ronson featuring Bruno Mars
24 January	"Uptown Funk"	Mark Ronson featuring Bruno Mars
31 January	"Christine"	Christine and the Queens
7 February	"Christine"	Christine and the Queens
14 February	"Christine"	Christine and the Queens
21 February	"Christine"	Christine and the Queens
28 February	"Cheerleader" (Felix Jaehn remix)	OMI
7 March	"Cheerleader" (Felix Jaehn remix)	OMI
14 March	"Cheerleader" (Felix Jaehn remix)	OMI
21 March	"Cheerleader" (Felix Jaehn remix)	OMI
28 March	"Christine"	Christine and the Queens
4 April	"Cheerleader" (Felix Jaehn remix)	OMI
11 April	"Goeiemorgend, Goeiendag" (Live)	Stan Van Samang
18 April	"See You Again"	Wiz Khalifa featuring Charlie Puth
25 April	"See You Again"	Wiz Khalifa featuring Charlie Puth
2 May	"See You Again"	Wiz Khalifa featuring Charlie Puth
9 May	"Een Ster (Live)"	Stan Van Samang
16 May	"The Hum"	Dimitri Vegas & Like Mike Vs. Ummet Ozcan
23 May	"Een Ster (Live)"	Stan Van Samang
30 May	"Rhythm Inside"	Loïc Nottet
6 June	"Rhythm Inside"	Loïc Nottet
13 June	"Rhythm Inside"	Loïc Nottet
20 June	"Rhythm Inside"	Loïc Nottet
27 June	"Reality"	Lost Frequencies featuring Janieck Devy
4 July	"Reality"	Lost Frequencies featuring Janieck Devy
11 July	"Reality"	Lost Frequencies featuring Janieck Devy
18 July	"Higher Place"	Dimitri Vegas & Like Mike feat. Ne-Yo
25 July	"Reality"	Lost Frequencies featuring Janieck Devy
1 August	"Higher Place"	Dimitri Vegas & Like Mike feat. Ne-Yo
8 August	"Higher Place"	Dimitri Vegas & Like Mike feat. Ne-Yo
15 August	"Higher Place"	Dimitri Vegas & Like Mike feat. Ne-Yo
22 August	"Reality"	Lost Frequencies featuring Janieck Devy
29 August	"Higher Place"	Dimitri Vegas & Like Mike feat. Ne-Yo
5 September	"Higher Place"	Dimitri Vegas & Like Mike feat. Ne-Yo
12 September	"Higher Place"	Dimitri Vegas & Like Mike feat. Ne-Yo
19 September	"Higher Place"	Dimitri Vegas & Like Mike feat. Ne-Yo
26 September	"Catch & Release" (Deepend remix)	Matt Simons
3 October	"Catch & Release" (Deepend remix)	Matt Simons
10 October	"Catch & Release" (Deepend remix)	Matt Simons
17 October	"Catch & Release" (Deepend remix)	Matt Simons
24 October	"Catch & Release" (Deepend remix)	Matt Simons
31 October	"Hello"	Adele
7 November	"Hello"	Adele
14 November	"Hello"	Adele
21 November	"10.000 luchtballonnen"	K3
28 November	"Hello"	Adele
5 December	"Hello"	Adele
12 December	"Hello"	Adele
19 December	"Hello"	Adele
26 December	"Hello"	Adele

Ranking of most weeks at number 1

Position	Artist	Weeks #1
1	Dimitri Vegas & Like Mike	9
2	Adele	8
2	Ne-Yo	8
3	Lost Frequencies	6
4	Christine and the Queens	5
4	Janieck Devy	5
4	Matt Simons	5
4	Omi	5
5	Loïc Nottet	4
6	Mark Ronson	3
6	Bruno Mars	3
6	Wiz Khalifa	3
6	Charlie Puth	3
6	Stan Van Samang	3
7	K3	1
7	Ummet Ozcan	1

Wallonia
Issue date	Song	Artist
3 January	"Dangerous"	David Guetta featuring Sam Martin
10 January	"Uptown Funk"	Mark Ronson featuring Bruno Mars
17 January	"Uptown Funk"	Mark Ronson featuring Bruno Mars
24 January	"Uptown Funk"	Mark Ronson featuring Bruno Mars
31 January	"Uptown Funk"	Mark Ronson featuring Bruno Mars
7 February	"Uptown Funk"	Mark Ronson featuring Bruno Mars
14 February	"Uptown Funk"	Mark Ronson featuring Bruno Mars
21 February	"Christine"	Christine and the Queens
28 February	"Christine"	Christine and the Queens
7 March	"Christine"	Christine and the Queens
14 March	"Christine"	Christine and the Queens
21 March	"Christine"	Christine and the Queens
28 March	"Cheerleader" (Felix Jaehn remix)	OMI
4 April	"Cheerleader" (Felix Jaehn remix)	OMI
11 April	"Cheerleader" (Felix Jaehn remix)	OMI
18 April	"Cheerleader" (Felix Jaehn remix)	OMI
25 April	"Cheerleader" (Felix Jaehn remix)	OMI
2 May	"Cheerleader" (Felix Jaehn remix)	OMI
9 May	"Cheerleader" (Felix Jaehn remix)	OMI
16 May	"Easy Come Easy Go"	Alice on the roof
23 May	"Goodbye"	Feder featuring Lyse
30 May	"Rhythm Inside"	Loïc Nottet
6 June	"Rhythm Inside"	Loïc Nottet
13 June	"Goodbye"	Feder featuring Lyse
20 June	"Goodbye"	Feder featuring Lyse
27 June	"Homeless"	Marina Kaye
4 July	"Homeless"	Marina Kaye
11 July	"Goodbye"	Feder featuring Lyse
18 July	"Reality"	Lost Frequencies featuring Janieck Devy
25 July	"Reality"	Lost Frequencies featuring Janieck Devy
1 August	"Reality"	Lost Frequencies featuring Janieck Devy
8 August	"Reality"	Lost Frequencies featuring Janieck Devy
15 August	"Reality"	Lost Frequencies featuring Janieck Devy
22 August	"El Perdón"	Nicky Jam featuring Enrique Iglesias
29 August	"El Perdón"	Nicky Jam featuring Enrique Iglesias
5 September	"Stolen Car"	Mylène Farmer & Sting
12 September	"El Perdón"	Nicky Jam feat. Enrique Iglesias
19 September	"How Deep Is Your Love"	Calvin Harris & Disciples
26 September	"How Deep Is Your Love"	Calvin Harris & Disciples
3 October	"How Deep Is Your Love"	Calvin Harris & Disciples
10 October	"How Deep Is Your Love"	Calvin Harris & Disciples
17 October	"Catch & Release"	Matt Simons
24 October	"Catch & Release"	Matt Simons
31 October	"Hello"	Adele
7 November	"Hello"	Adele
14 November	"Hello"	Adele
21 November	"Hello"	Adele
28 November	"Hello"	Adele
5 December	"Hello"	Adele
12 December	"Hello"	Adele
19 December	"Hello"	Adele
26 December	"Hello"	Adele

Ranking of most weeks at number 1

Position	Artist	Weeks #1
1	Adele	9
2	OMI	7
3	Mark Ronson	6
3	Bruno Mars	6
4	Christine and the Queens	5
4	Lost Frequencies	5
4	Janieck Devy	5
5	Calvin Harris	4
5	Disciples	4
5	Feder	4
5	Lyse	4
6	Nicky Jam	3
6	Enrique Iglesias	3
7	Loïc Nottet	2
7	Marina Kaye	2
7	Matt Simons	2
8	David Guetta	1
8	Sam Martin	1
8	Alice on the roof	1
8	Mylène Farmer	1
8	Sting	1

== See also ==
- 2015 in music
