= List of Ultratop 50 number-one singles of 2008 =

These hits topped the Ultratop 50 in 2008.

Issue Date	Artist	Song
January 5	Rihanna	Don't Stop the Music
January 12	Rihanna	Don't Stop the Music
January 19	Rihanna	Don't Stop the Music
January 26	Rihanna	Don't Stop the Music
February 2	Rihanna	Don't Stop the Music
February 9	Leona Lewis	Bleeding Love
February 16	Leona Lewis	Bleeding Love
February 23	Leona Lewis	Bleeding Love
March 1	Leona Lewis	Bleeding Love
March 8	Leona Lewis	Bleeding Love
March 15	Leona Lewis	Bleeding Love
March 22	Leona Lewis	Bleeding Love
March 29	Ishtar	O julissi ^{1}
April 5	Ishtar	O julissi ^{1}
April 12	Christoff	Een ster (A Star)
April 19	Laura Lynn & Frans Bauer	Al duurt de nacht tot morgenvroeg
April 26	Madonna featuring Justin Timberlake and Timbaland	4Minutes
May 3	Madonna featuring Justin Timberlake and Timbaland	4Minutes
May 10	Madonna featuring Justin Timberlake and Timbaland	4Minutes
May 17	Madonna featuring Justin Timberlake and Timbaland	4Minutes
May 24	Madonna featuring Justin Timberlake and Timbaland	4Minutes
May 31	Madonna featuring Justin Timberlake and Timbaland	4Minutes
June 7	Estelle feat Kanye West	American Boy
June 14	Estelle feat Kanye West	American Boy
June 21	Laurent Wolf	No Stress
June 28	Amy Macdonald	This Is the Life
July 5	Amy Macdonald	This Is the Life
July 12	Amy Macdonald	This Is the Life
July 19	Amy Macdonald	This Is the Life
July 26	Amy Macdonald	This Is the Life
August 2	Amy Macdonald	This Is the Life
August 9	Amy Macdonald	This Is the Life
August 16	Amy Macdonald	This Is the Life
August 23	Amy Macdonald	This Is the Life
August 30	Amy Macdonald	This Is the Life
September 6	Amy Macdonald	This Is the Life
September 13	Katy Perry	I Kissed a Girl
September 20	Katy Perry	I Kissed a Girl
September 27	Katy Perry	I Kissed a Girl
October 4	Katy Perry	I Kissed a Girl
October 11	Rihanna	Disturbia
October 18	Katy Perry	I Kissed a Girl
October 25	Milow	Ayo Technology
November 1	Milow	Ayo Technology
November 8	Guru Josh Project	Infinity 2008
November 15	Guru Josh Project	Infinity 2008
November 22	Guru Josh Project	Infinity 2008
November 29	Guru Josh Project	Infinity 2008
December 6	Guru Josh Project	Infinity 2008
December 13	Guru Josh Project	Infinity 2008
December 20	Britney Spears	Womanizer
December 27	Tom Helsen & Geike Arnaert	Home

== See also ==
- 2008 in music

== Notes ==
1. Belgian entry to the 2008 Eurovision Song Contest
