= List of VRT Top 30 number-one singles of 1994 =

These hits topped the Ultratop 50 in the Flanders region of Belgium in 1994.

Issue Date	Artist	Song
January 1	Bryan Adams	Please Forgive Me
January 8	Bryan Adams	Please forgive me
January 15	Meat Loaf	I'd Do Anything for Love (But I Won't Do That)
January 22	Bryan Adams	Please forgive me
January 29	Bryan Adams	Please forgive me
February 5	Laura Pausini	La solitudine
February 12	Laura Pausini	La solitudine
February 19	Laura Pausini	La solitudine
February 26	Laura Pausini	La solitudine
March 5	Laura Pausini	La solitudine
March 12	Laura Pausini	La solitudine
March 19	Laura Pausini	La solitudine
March 26	Laura Pausini	La solitudine
April 2	Bruce Springsteen	Streets of Philadelphia
April 9	Mariah Carey	Without you
April 16	Bruce Springsteen	Streets of Philadelphia
April 23	Mariah Carey	Without you
April 30	Mariah Carey	Without you
May 7	Mariah Carey	Without you
May 14	Mariah Carey	Without you
May 21	Mariah Carey	Without you
May 28	Mariah Carey	Without you
June 4	Reel 2 Real & The Mad Stuntman	I Like to Move It
June 11	Reel 2 Real & The Mad Stuntman	I like to move it
June 18	Reel 2 Real & The Mad Stuntman	I like to move it
June 25	Reel 2 Real & The Mad Stuntman	I like to move it
July 2	Reel 2 Real & The Mad Stuntman	I like to move it
July 9	Crash Test Dummies	Mmm Mmm Mmm Mmm
July 16	Crash Test Dummies	Mmm mmm mmm mmm
July 23	Crash Test Dummies	Mmm mmm mmm mmm
July 30	Good Shape	Give me fire
August 6	Good Shape	Give me fire
August 13	Good Shape	Give me fire
August 20	Wet Wet Wet	Love is all around
August 27	Wet Wet Wet	Love is all around
September 3	Wet Wet Wet	Love is all around
September 10	Wet Wet Wet	Love is all around
September 17	Wet Wet Wet	Love is all around
September 24	Wet Wet Wet	Love is all around
October 1	Wet Wet Wet	Love is all around
October 8	Wet Wet Wet	Love is all around
October 15	Rednex	Cotton-Eyed Joe
October 22	Rednex	Cotton-Eyed Joe
October 29	Rednex	Cotton-Eyed Joe
November 5	Ice MC	It's a Rainy Day
November 12	Rednex	Cotton-Eyed Joe
November 19	Rednex	Cotton-Eyed Joe
November 26	Good Shape	King of your heart
December 3	Good Shape	King of your heart
December 10	Bon Jovi	Always
December 17	Bon Jovi	Always
December 24	Bon Jovi	Always
December 31	Marco Borsato	Dromen zijn bedrog

== See also ==
- 1994 in music
