= List of number-one hits of 1982 (Flanders) =

These hits topped the Ultratop 50 in the Flanders region of Belgium in 1982.

Issue date	Song	Artist
2 January	"One of Us"	ABBA
9 January	"One of Us"	ABBA
16 January	"One of Us"	ABBA
23 January	"One of Us"	ABBA
30 January	"One of Us"	ABBA
6 February	"I Won't Let You Down"	Ph.D.
13 February	"I Won't Let You Down"	Ph.D.
20 February	"I Won't Let You Down"	Ph.D.
27 February	"Don't You Want Me"	The Human League
6 March	"I Won't Let You Down"	Ph.D.
13 March	"The Land of Make Believe"	Bucks Fizz
20 March	"Maid of Orleans (The Waltz Joan of Arc)"	Orchestral Manoeuvres in the Dark
27 March	"Maid of Orleans (The Waltz Joan of Arc)"	Orchestral Manoeuvres in the Dark
3 April	"Maid of Orleans (The Waltz Joan of Arc)"	Orchestral Manoeuvres in the Dark
10 April	"Maid of Orleans (The Waltz Joan of Arc)"	Orchestral Manoeuvres in the Dark
17 April	"Maid of Orleans (The Waltz Joan of Arc)"	Orchestral Manoeuvres in the Dark
24 April	"The Lion Sleeps Tonight"	Tight Fit
1 May	"The Lion Sleeps Tonight"	Tight Fit
8 May	"Aurora"	Nova
15 May	"Ein bißchen Frieden"	Nicole
22 May	"Ein bißchen Frieden"	Nicole
29 May	"Ein bißchen Frieden"	Nicole
5 June	"Ein bißchen Frieden"	Nicole
12 June	"Ein bißchen Frieden"	Nicole
19 June	"Can't Take My Eyes Off You"	Boys Town Gang
26 June	"Can't Take My Eyes Off You"	Boys Town Gang
3 July	"Can't Take My Eyes Off You"	Boys Town Gang
10 July	"Can't Take My Eyes Off You"	Boys Town Gang
17 July	"I Will Follow Him"	José
24 July	"I Will Follow Him"	José
31 July	"I Will Follow Him"	José
7 August	"Someone Loves You Honey"	June Lodge & Prince Mohamed
14 August	"Someone Loves You Honey"	June Lodge & Prince Mohamed
21 August	"Words"	F. R. David
28 August	"Words"	F. R. David
4 September	"Words"	F. R. David
11 September	"It Started with a Kiss"	Hot Chocolate
18 September	"I Know There's Something Going On"	Frida
25 September	"I Know There's Something Going On"	Frida
2 October	"I Know There's Something Going On"	Frida
9 October	"Don't Go"	Yazoo
16 October	"Don't Go"	Yazoo
23 October	"Private Investigations"	Dire Straits
30 October	"Come On Eileen"	Dexys Midnight Runners
6 November	"Come On Eileen"	Dexys Midnight Runners
13 November	"Pass the Dutchie"	Musical Youth
20 November	"Pass the Dutchie"	Musical Youth
27 November	"Pass the Dutchie"	Musical Youth
4 December	"Do You Really Want to Hurt Me"	Culture Club
11 December	"Do You Really Want to Hurt Me"	Culture Club
18 December	"Do You Really Want to Hurt Me"	Culture Club
25 December	"I Don't Wanna Dance"	Eddy Grant

== See also ==
- 1982 in music
