= List of number one hits in Belgium (1972) =

This is a list of the singles that topped the Ultratop 50 in the Flanders region of Belgium in 1972.

Issue date	Song	Artist
1 January	"(Is This the Way to) Amarillo"	Tony Christie
8 January	"How Do You Do"	Mouth and MacNeal
15 January	"How Do You Do"	Mouth and MacNeal
22 January	"How Do You Do"	Mouth and MacNeal
29 January	"How Do You Do"	Mouth and MacNeal
5 February	"How Do You Do"	Mouth and MacNeal
12 February	"Sacramento (A Wonderful Town)"	Middle of the Road
19 February	"Sacramento (A Wonderful Town)"	Middle of the Road
26 February	"Sacramento (A Wonderful Town)"	Middle of the Road
4 March	"Sacramento (A Wonderful Town)"	Middle of the Road
11 March	"Sacramento (A Wonderful Town)"	Middle of the Road
18 March	"Sacramento (A Wonderful Town)"	Middle of the Road
25 March	"Poppa Joe"	The Sweet
1 April	"Poppa Joe"	The Sweet
8 April	"Poppa Joe"	The Sweet
15 April	"Son of My Father"	Chicory Tip
22 April	"Samson and Delilah"	Middle of the Road
29 April	"Samson and Delilah"	Middle of the Road
6 May	"Samson and Delilah"	Middle of the Road
13 May	"Après toi"	Vicky Leandros
20 May	"Après toi"	Vicky Leandros
27 May	"Après toi"	Vicky Leandros
3 June	"Weet je nog die slow"	Willy Sommers
10 June	"Weet je nog die slow"	Willy Sommers
17 June	"Hello-A"	Mouth and MacNeal
24 June	"Hello-A"	Mouth and MacNeal
1 July	"Hello-A"	Mouth and MacNeal
8 July	"Hello-A"	Mouth and MacNeal
15 July	"Hello-A"	Mouth and MacNeal
22 July	"Hello-A"	Mouth and MacNeal
29 July	"Hello-A"	Mouth and MacNeal
5 August	"Mouldy Old Dough"	Lieutenant Pigeon
12 August	"Pop Corn"	Anarchic System
19 August	"Pop Corn"	Anarchic System
26 August	"Pop Corn"	Anarchic System
2 September	"Pop Corn"	Anarchic System
9 September	"Pop Corn"	Anarchic System
16 September	"Pop Corn"	Anarchic System
23 September	"Un canto a Galicia"	Julio Iglesias
30 September	"Un canto a Galicia"	Julio Iglesias
7 October	"Un canto a Galicia"	Julio Iglesias
14 October	"Un canto a Galicia"	Julio Iglesias
21 October	"Sugar Me"	Lynsey De Paul
28 October	"Sugar Me"	Lynsey De Paul
4 November	"Sugar Me"	Lynsey De Paul
11 November	"Sugar Me"	Lynsey De Paul
18 November	"Sugar Me"	Lynsey De Paul
25 November	"Sugar Me"	Lynsey De Paul
2 December	"I Think I Love You"	The Partridge Family
9 December	"I Think I Love You"	The Partridge Family
16 December	"Clair"	Gilbert O'Sullivan
23 December	"Uberall auf der Welt"	Freddy Breck
30 December	"Uberall auf der Welt"	Freddy Breck

== 1972 Year-End Chart ==
=== Singles ===
Pos.	Title	Artist	Peak
1	"Un canto a Galicia"	Julio Iglesias	1
2	"Sacramento (A Wonderful Town)"	Middle of the Road	1
3	"Eviva España"	Samantha	3
4	"Jessica"	Rocco Granata	4
5	"Poppa Joe"	The Sweet	1
6	"How Do You Do"	Mouth and MacNeal	1
7	"Weet je nog die slow"	Willy Sommers	1
8	"Verlaat me nooit"	Salim Seghers	2
9	"Smoke Gets In Your Eyes"	Blue Haze	2
10	"Hello-A"	Mouth and MacNeal	1

== See also ==
- 1972 in music
