= List of number-one hits of 1987 (Flanders) =

These hits topped the Ultratop 50 in the Flanders region of Belgium in 1987.

| Date | Artist | Title |
|---|---|---|
| January 3 | The Bangles | "Walk Like an Egyptian" |
| January 10 | The Bangles | "Walk Like an Egyptian" |
| January 17 | Pet Shop Boys | "Suburbia" |
| January 24 | Mel & Kim | "Showing Out (Get Fresh at the Weekend)" |
| January 31 | Mel & Kim | "Showing Out (Get Fresh at the Weekend)" |
| February 7 | Mel & Kim | "Showing Out (Get Fresh at the Weekend)" |
| February 14 | Jackie Wilson | "Reet Petite" |
| February 21 | Jackie Wilson | "Reet Petite" |
| February 28 | Jackie Wilson | "Reet Petite" |
| March 7 | Jackie Wilson | "Reet Petite" |
| March 14 | Aretha Franklin & George Michael | "I Knew You Were Waiting (For Me)" |
| March 21 | Aretha Franklin & George Michael | "I Knew You Were Waiting (For Me)" |
| March 28 | Mel & Kim | "Respectable" |
| April 4 | Mel & Kim | "Respectable" |
| April 11 | Mel & Kim | "Respectable" |
| April 18 | Mel & Kim | "Respectable" |
| April 25 | Piet Veerman | "Sailing Home" |
| May 2 | Piet Veerman | "Sailing Home" |
| May 9 | Piet Veerman | "Sailing Home" |
| May 16 | Piet Veerman | "Sailing Home" |
| May 23 | Jan Hammer | "Crockett's Theme" |
| May 30 | Jan Hammer | "Crockett's Theme" |
| June 6 | Johnny Logan | "Hold Me Now" |
| June 13 | Johnny Logan | "Hold Me Now" |
| June 20 | Johnny Logan | "Hold Me Now" |
| June 27 | Johnny Logan | "Hold Me Now" |
| July 4 | Whitney Houston | "I Wanna Dance with Somebody (Who Loves Me)" |
| July 11 | Whitney Houston | "I Wanna Dance with Somebody (Who Loves Me)" |
| July 18 | Whitney Houston | "I Wanna Dance with Somebody (Who Loves Me)" |
| July 25 | George Michael | "I Want Your Sex" |
| August 1 | George Michael | "I Want Your Sex" |
| August 8 | Madonna | "Who's That Girl" |
| August 15 | Madonna | "Who's That Girl" |
| August 22 | Michael Jackson | "I Just Can't Stop Loving You" |
| August 29 | Michael Jackson | "I Just Can't Stop Loving You" |
| September 5 | Michael Jackson | "I Just Can't Stop Loving You" |
| September 12 | Michael Jackson | "I Just Can't Stop Loving You" |
| September 19 | Michael Jackson | "I Just Can't Stop Loving You" |
| September 26 | Michael Jackson | "I Just Can't Stop Loving You" |
| October 3 | Michael Jackson | "Bad" |
| October 10 | Michael Jackson | "Bad" |
| October 17 | Michael Jackson | "Bad" |
| October 24 | Rick Astley | "Never Gonna Give You Up" |
| October 31 | Rick Astley | "Never Gonna Give You Up" |
| November 7 | Rick Astley | "Never Gonna Give You Up" |
| November 14 | Rick Astley | "Never Gonna Give You Up" |
| November 21 | George Michael | "Faith" |
| November 28 | George Michael | "Faith" |
| December 5 | George Michael | "Faith" |
| December 12 | George Michael | "Faith" |
| December 19 | George Michael | "Faith" |
| December 26 | George Michael | "Faith" |

== See also ==
- 1987 in music
