= Ultratop 50 number-one hits of 1998 =

These hits topped the Ultratop 50 in 1998.

Date	Artist	Title
January 3	Aqua	"Barbie Girl"
January 10	Aqua	"Barbie Girl"
January 17	Natalie Imbruglia	"Torn"
January 24	Natalie Imbruglia	"Torn"
January 31	Natalie Imbruglia	"Torn"
February 7	Natalie Imbruglia	"Torn"
February 14	Natalie Imbruglia	"Torn"
February 21	Natalie Imbruglia	"Torn"
February 28	Natalie Imbruglia	"Torn"
March 7	Céline Dion	"My heart will go on"
March 14	Céline Dion	"My heart will go on"
March 21	DJ Visage	"Formula"
March 28	DJ Visage	"Formula"
April 4	DJ Visage	"Formula"
April 11	DJ Visage	"Formula"
April 18	Céline Dion	"My heart will go on"
April 25	Céline Dion	"My heart will go on"
May 2	Céline Dion	"My heart will go on"
May 9	Céline Dion	"My heart will go on"
May 16	Céline Dion	"My heart will go on"
May 23	Steps	"Last thing on my mind"
May 30	Steps	"Last thing on my mind"
June 6	Steps	"Last thing on my mind"
June 13	Steps	"Last thing on my mind"
June 20	Steps	"Last thing on my mind"
June 27	Steps	"Last thing on my mind"
July 4	Steps	"Last thing on my mind"
July 11	Steps	"Last thing on my mind"
July 18	Steps	"Last thing on my mind"
July 25	Steps	"Last thing on my mind"
August 1	Pras Michel, ODB & Mýa	"Ghetto Supastar (That Is What You Are)"
August 8	Pras Michel, ODB & Mýa	"Ghetto supastar (that is what you are)"
August 15	Pras Michel, ODB & Mýa	"Ghetto supastar (that is what you are)"
August 22	Pras Michel, ODB & Mýa	"Ghetto supastar (that is what you are)"
August 29	Pras Michel, ODB & Mýa	"Ghetto supastar (that is what you are)"
September 5	Steps	"One For Sorrow"
September 12	Vengaboys	"We like to party (The Vengabus)"
September 19	Vengaboys	"We like to party (The Vengabus)"
September 26	Vengaboys	"We like to party (The Vengabus)"
October 3	Vengaboys	"We like to party (The Vengabus)"
October 10	Vengaboys	"We like to party (The Vengabus)"
October 17	Vengaboys	"We like to party (The Vengabus)"
October 24	Vengaboys	"We like to party (The Vengabus)"
October 31	Scooter	"How Much Is the Fish?"
November 7	Scooter	"How much is the fish"
November 14	Scooter	"How much is the fish"
November 21	Vengaboys	"Boom, Boom, Boom, Boom!!"
November 28	Vengaboys	"Boom boom boom boom"
December 5	Vengaboys	"Boom boom boom boom"
December 12	Cher	"Believe"
December 19	Emilia	"Big Big World"
December 26	Emilia	"Big big world"

== See also ==
- 1998 in music
