= List of Ultratop 50 number-one singles of 2014 =

These hits topped the Ultratop 50 in 2014.

Flanders
| Issue date | Song | Artist |
|---|---|---|
| 4 January | "Jubel" | Klingande |
| 11 January | "Happy" | Pharrell Williams |
| 18 January | "Jubel" | Klingande |
| 25 January | "Happy" | Pharrell Williams |
| 1 February | "Jubel" | Klingande |
| 8 February | "Happy" | Pharrell Williams |
| 15 February | "Happy" | Pharrell Williams |
| 22 February | "Happy" | Pharrell Williams |
| 1 March | "Dark Horse" | Katy Perry featuring Juicy J |
| 8 March | "Dark Horse" | Katy Perry featuring Juicy J |
| 15 March | "Happy" | Pharrell Williams |
| 22 March | "Dark Horse" | Katy Perry featuring Juicy J |
| 29 March | "Happy" | Pharrell Williams |
| 5 April | "Happy" | Pharrell Williams |
| 12 April | "Say Something" | A Great Big World and Christina Aguilera |
| 19 April | "Say Something" | A Great Big World and Christina Aguilera |
| 26 April | "Waves" | Mr Probz |
| 3 May | "Waves" | Mr Probz |
| 10 May | "Waves" | Mr Probz |
| 17 May | "Calm After the Storm" | The Common Linnets |
| 24 May | "Waves" | Mr Probz |
| 31 May | "Waves" | Mr Probz |
| 7 June | "Hideaway" | Kiesza |
| 14 June | "Hideaway" | Kiesza |
| 21 June | "Hideaway" | Kiesza |
| 28 June | "Running Low" | Netsky featuring Beth Ditto |
| 5 July | "Dance With The Devils" | Gunther D |
| 12 July | "Prayer in C (Robin Schulz Remix)" | Lilly Wood and the Prick and Robin Schulz |
| 19 July | "Prayer in C (Robin Schulz Remix)" | Lilly Wood and the Prick and Robin Schulz |
| 26 July | "Prayer in C (Robin Schulz Remix)" | Lilly Wood and the Prick and Robin Schulz |
| 2 August | "Prayer in C (Robin Schulz Remix)" | Lilly Wood and the Prick and Robin Schulz |
| 9 August | "Prayer in C (Robin Schulz Remix)" | Lilly Wood and the Prick and Robin Schulz |
| 16 August | "Prayer in C (Robin Schulz Remix)" | Lilly Wood and the Prick and Robin Schulz |
| 23 August | "Home" | Dotan |
| 30 August | "Home" | Dotan |
| 6 September | "Home" | Dotan |
| 13 September | "Take Me to Church" | Hozier |
| 20 September | "Take Me to Church" | Hozier |
| 27 September | "Take Me to Church" | Hozier |
| 4 October | "Take Me to Church" | Hozier |
| 11 October | "Take Me to Church" | Hozier |
| 18 October | "Take Me to Church" | Hozier |
| 25 October | "Take Me to Church" | Hozier |
| 1 November | "Take Me to Church" | Hozier |
| 8 November | "Take Me to Church" | Hozier |
| 15 November | "Take Me to Church" | Hozier |
| 22 November | "Sexy Als Ik Dans" | Nielson |
| 29 November | "Do They Know It's Christmas?" | Band Aid 30 |
| 6 December | "Are You With Me" | Lost Frequencies |
| 13 December | "Are You With Me" | Lost Frequencies |
| 20 December | "Are You With Me" | Lost Frequencies |
| 27 December | "Are You With Me" | Lost Frequencies |

Ranking of most weeks at number 1

| Position | Artist | Weeks #1 |
|---|---|---|
| 1 | Hozier | 10 |
| 2 | Pharrell Williams | 8 |
| 3 | Lilly Wood & The Prick | 6 |
| 4 | Mr Probz | 5 |
| 5 | Lost Frequencies | 4 |
| 6 | Dotan | 3 |
| 6 | Katy Perry | 3 |
| 6 | Kiesza | 3 |
| 6 | Klingande | 3 |
| 7 | A Great Big World | 2 |
| 7 | Christina Aguilera | 2 |
| 8 | The Common Linnets | 1 |
| 8 | Netsky | 1 |
| 8 | Beth Ditto | 1 |
| 8 | Nielson | 1 |

Wallonia
| Issue date | Song | Artist |
|---|---|---|
| 4 January | "Tous les mêmes" | Stromae |
| 11 January | "Happy" | Pharrell Williams |
| 18 January | "Happy" | Pharrell Williams |
| 25 January | "Happy" | Pharrell Williams |
| 1 February | "Happy" | Pharrell Williams |
| 8 February | "Happy" | Pharrell Williams |
| 15 February | "Happy" | Pharrell Williams |
| 22 February | "Happy" | Pharrell Williams |
| 1 March | "Happy" | Pharrell Williams |
| 8 March | "Happy" | Pharrell Williams |
| 15 March | "Happy" | Pharrell Williams |
| 22 March | "Happy" | Pharrell Williams |
| 29 March | "Happy" | Pharrell Williams |
| 5 April | "Happy" | Pharrell Williams |
| 12 April | "Stolen Dance" | Milky Chance |
| 19 April | "Stolen Dance" | Milky Chance |
| 26 April | "Happy" | Pharrell Williams |
| 3 May | "Midnight" | Coldplay |
| 10 May | "A Sky Full of Stars" | Coldplay |
| 17 May | "Happy" | Pharrell Williams |
| 24 May | "Happy" | Pharrell Williams |
| 31 May | "Happy" | Pharrell Williams |
| 7 June | "Stolen Dance" | Milky Chance |
| 14 June | "Stolen Dance" | Milky Chance |
| 21 June | "We Are One (Ole Ola)" | Pitbull featuring Jennifer Lopez and Claudia Leitte |
| 28 June | "Magic in the Air" | Magic System featuring Chawki |
| 5 July | "Magic in the Air" | Magic System featuring Chawki |
| 12 July | "Magic in the Air" | Magic System featuring Chawki |
| 19 July | "Prayer in C (Robin Schulz Remix)" | Lilly Wood and the Prick and Robin Schulz |
| 26 July | "Prayer in C (Robin Schulz Remix)" | Lilly Wood and the Prick and Robin Schulz |
| 2 August | "Prayer in C (Robin Schulz Remix)" | Lilly Wood and the Prick and Robin Schulz |
| 9 August | "Prayer in C (Robin Schulz Remix)" | Lilly Wood and the Prick and Robin Schulz |
| 16 August | "Prayer in C (Robin Schulz Remix)" | Lilly Wood and the Prick and Robin Schulz |
| 23 August | "Prayer in C (Robin Schulz Remix)" | Lilly Wood and the Prick and Robin Schulz |
| 30 August | "Prayer in C (Robin Schulz Remix)" | Lilly Wood and the Prick and Robin Schulz |
| 6 September | "Prayer in C (Robin Schulz Remix)" | Lilly Wood and the Prick and Robin Schulz |
| 13 September | "Prayer in C (Robin Schulz Remix)" | Lilly Wood and the Prick and Robin Schulz |
| 20 September | "Prayer in C (Robin Schulz Remix)" | Lilly Wood and the Prick and Robin Schulz |
| 27 September | "Prayer in C (Robin Schulz Remix)" | Lilly Wood and the Prick and Robin Schulz |
| 4 October | "Prayer in C (Robin Schulz Remix)" | Lilly Wood and the Prick and Robin Schulz |
| 11 October | "Prayer in C (Robin Schulz Remix)" | Lilly Wood and the Prick and Robin Schulz |
| 18 October | "Prayer in C (Robin Schulz Remix)" | Lilly Wood and the Prick and Robin Schulz |
| 25 October | "Prayer in C (Robin Schulz Remix)" | Lilly Wood and the Prick and Robin Schulz |
| 1 November | "Dangerous" | David Guetta featuring Sam Martin |
| 8 November | "Dangerous" | David Guetta featuring Sam Martin |
| 15 November | "Dangerous" | David Guetta featuring Sam Martin |
| 22 November | "Dangerous" | David Guetta featuring Sam Martin |
| 29 November | "Dangerous" | David Guetta featuring Sam Martin |
| 6 December | "Dangerous" | David Guetta featuring Sam Martin |
| 13 December | "Dangerous" | David Guetta featuring Sam Martin |
| 20 December | "Alone" | Selah Sue |
| 27 December | "Dangerous" | David Guetta featuring Sam Martin |

Ranking of most weeks at number 1

| Position | Artist | Weeks #1 |
|---|---|---|
| 1 | Pharrell Williams | 17 |
| 2 | Lilly Wood & The Prick | 15 |
| 3 | David Guetta | 8 |
| 4 | Milky Chance | 4 |
| 5 | Coldplay | 2 |
| 6 | Stromae | 1 |
| 6 | Pitbull | 1 |
| 6 | Selah Sue | 1 |

== See also ==
- 2014 in music
