= List of Ultratop 50 number-one singles of 2002 =

These hits topped the Ultratop 50 in 2002.

Issue Date	Artist	Title
January 5	Kate Winslet	"What If"
January 12	Kate Winslet	"What If"
January 19	Kate Winslet	"What If"
January 26	Kate Winslet	"What If"
February 2	Kate Winslet	"What If"
February 9	Marco & Sita	"Lopen Op Het Water"
February 16	Marco & Sita	"Lopen Op Het Water"
February 23	Marco & Sita	"Lopen Op Het Water"
March 2	Shakira	"Whenever, Wherever"
March 9	Shakira	"Whenever, Wherever"
March 16	Shakira	"Whenever, Wherever"
March 23	Shakira	"Whenever, Wherever"
March 30	Shakira	"Whenever, Wherever"
April 6	Shakira	"Whenever, Wherever"
April 13	Shakira	"Whenever, Wherever"
April 20	Kate Ryan	"Désenchantée"
April 27	Kate Ryan	"Désenchantée"
May 4	Kate Ryan	"Désenchantée"
May 11	Kate Ryan	"Désenchantée"
May 18	Kate Ryan	"Désenchantée"
May 25	Kate Ryan	"Désenchantée"
June 1	112	"Dance with Me"
June 8	112	"Dance With Me"
June 15	112	"Dance With Me"
June 22	112	"Dance With Me"
June 29	Shakira	"Underneath Your Clothes"
July 6	Shakira	"Underneath Your Clothes"
July 13	Shakira	"Underneath Your Clothes"
July 20	Shakira	"Underneath Your Clothes"
July 27	Shakira	"Underneath Your Clothes"
August 3	Shakira	"Underneath Your Clothes"
August 10	Dynamite & Robsnob	"De pizza dans"
August 17	Brainpower	"Dansplaat"
August 24	Brainpower	"Dansplaat"
August 31	Las Ketchup	"The Ketchup Song (Asereje)"
September 7	Las Ketchup	"The Ketchup Song (Asereje)"
September 14	Las Ketchup	"The Ketchup Song (Asereje)"
September 21	Las Ketchup	"The Ketchup Song (Asereje)"
September 28	Las Ketchup	"The Ketchup Song (Asereje)"
October 5	Las Ketchup	"The Ketchup Song (Asereje)"
October 12	Las Ketchup	"The Ketchup Song (Asereje)"
October 19	Las Ketchup	"The Ketchup Song (Asereje)"
October 26	Las Ketchup	"The Ketchup Song (Asereje)"
November 2	Las Ketchup	"The Ketchup Song (Asereje)"
November 9	Las Ketchup	"The Ketchup Song (Asereje)"
November 16	Las Ketchup	"The Ketchup Song (Asereje)"
November 23	Nelly featuring Kelly Rowland	"Dilemma"
November 30	Nelly featuring Kelly Rowland	"Dilemma"
December 7	Nelly featuring Kelly Rowland	"Dilemma"
December 14	Nelly featuring Kelly Rowland	"Dilemma"
December 21	Nelly featuring Kelly Rowland	"Dilemma"
December 28	Nelly featuring Kelly Rowland	"Dilemma"

== See also ==
- 2002 in music
