= List of number-one hits of 1980 (Flanders) =

These hits topped the Ultratop 50 in the Flanders region of Belgium in 1980.

| Issue date | Song | Artist |
|---|---|---|
| 5 January | "Een Bakske Vol Met Stro" | Urbanus |
| 12 January | "Een Bakske Vol Met Stro" | Urbanus |
| 19 January | "I Have a Dream" | ABBA |
| 26 January | "I Have a Dream" | ABBA |
| 2 February | "I Have a Dream" | ABBA |
| 9 February | "I Have a Dream" | ABBA |
| 16 February | "Rap-O Clap-O" | Joe Bataan |
| 23 February | "Rap-O Clap-O" | Joe Bataan |
| 1 March | "Que Sera Mi Vida" | Gibson Brothers |
| 8 March | "Que Sera Mi Vida" | Gibson Brothers |
| 15 March | "Do That to Me One More Time" | Captain & Tennille |
| 22 March | "Do That to Me One More Time" | Captain & Tennille |
| 29 March | "Crying" | Don Mclean |
| 6 April | "Crying" | Don Mclean |
| 13 April | "Matador" | Garland Jeffreys |
| 20 April | "Matador" | Garland Jeffreys |
| 27 April | "You and Me" | Spargo |
| 3 May | "You and Me" | Spargo |
| 10 May | "Sun of Jamaica" | Goombay Dance Band |
| 17 May | "Sun of Jamaica" | Goombay Dance Band |
| 24 May | "Sun of Jamaica" | Goombay Dance Band |
| 31 May | "What's Another Year" | Johnny Logan |
| 7 June | "What's Another Year" | Johnny Logan |
| 14 June | "Funkytown" | Lipps Inc |
| 21 June | "Funkytown" | Lipps Inc |
| 28 June | "Cara Mia" | Jay and the Americans |
| 5 July | "Cara Mia" | Jay and the Americans |
| 12 July | "Cara Mia" | Jay and the Americans |
| 19 July | "Cara Mia" | Jay and the Americans |
| 26 July | "Xanadu" | Olivia Newton-John & Electric Light Orchestra |
| 2 August | "Xanadu" | Olivia Newton-John & Electric Light Orchestra |
| 9 August | "Xanadu" | Olivia Newton-John & Electric Light Orchestra |
| 16 August | "Xanadu" | Olivia Newton-John & Electric Light Orchestra |
| 23 August | "Xanadu" | Olivia Newton-John & Electric Light Orchestra |
| 30 August | "The Winner Takes It All" | ABBA |
| 6 September | "The Winner Takes It All" | ABBA |
| 13 September | "The Winner Takes It All" | ABBA |
| 20 September | "The Winner Takes It All" | ABBA |
| 27 September | "The Winner Takes It All" | ABBA |
| 4 October | "The Winner Takes It All" | ABBA |
| 11 October | "The Winner Takes It All" | ABBA |
| 18 October | "One Day I'll Fly Away" | Randy Crawford |
| 25 October | "One Day I'll Fly Away" | Randy Crawford |
| 1 November | "Woman in Love" | Barbra Streisand |
| 8 November | "Woman in Love" | Barbra Streisand |
| 15 November | "Woman in Love" | Barbra Streisand |
| 22 November | "Woman in Love" | Barbra Streisand |
| 29 November | "Woman in Love" | Barbra Streisand |
| 6 December | "Woman in Love" | Barbra Streisand |
| 13 December | "Super Trouper" | ABBA |
| 20 December | "Super Trouper" | ABBA |
| 27 December | "Super Trouper" | ABBA |

== See also ==
- 1980 in music
