= List of number-one hits of 1989 (Flanders) =

These hits topped the Ultratop 50 in the Flanders region of Belgium in 1989.

Date	Artist	Title
January 7	Enya	"Orinoco Flow"
January 14	Michael Jackson	"Smooth Criminal"
January 21	Robin Beck	"First Time"
January 28	Robin Beck	"First Time"
February 4	Gloria Estefan and Miami Sound Machine	"Can't Stay Away From You"
February 11	Gloria Estefan and Miami Sound Machine	"Can't Stay Away From You"
February 18	Roy Orbison	"You Got It"
February 25	Roy Orbison	"You Got It"
March 4	Roy Orbison	"You Got It"
March 11	Roy Orbison	"You Got It"
March 18	Roy Orbison	"You Got It"
March 25	Samantha Fox	"I Only Wanna Be With You"
April 1	Samantha Fox	"I Only Wanna Be With You"
April 8	Madonna	"Like a Prayer"
April 15	Madonna	"Like a Prayer"
April 22	Madonna	"Like a Prayer"
April 29	Madonna	"Like a Prayer"
May 6	Madonna	"Like a Prayer"
May 13	The Bangles	"Eternal Flame"
May 20	The Bangles	"Eternal Flame"
May 27	The Bangles	"Eternal Flame"
June 3	The Bangles	"Eternal Flame"
June 10	The Bangles	"Eternal Flame"
June 17	Clouseau	"Anne"
June 24	Rocco Granata & The Carnations	"Marina (Remix 89)"
July 1	Rocco Granata & The Carnations	"Marina (Remix 89)"
July 8	Rocco Granata & The Carnations	"Marina (Remix 89)"
July 15	Rocco Granata & The Carnations	"Marina (Remix 89)"
July 22	Rocco Granata & The Carnations	"Marina (Remix 89)"
July 29	Gerard Joling	"No More Boleros"
August 5	Gerard Joling	"No More Boleros"
August 12	Gerard Joling	"No More Boleros"
August 19	Kaoma	"Lambada"
August 26	Kaoma	"Lambada"
September 2	Kaoma	"Lambada"
September 9	Kaoma	"Lambada"
September 16	Kaoma	"Lambada"
September 23	Kaoma	"Lambada"
September 30	Jive Bunny and the Mastermixers	"Swing The Mood"
October 7	Jive Bunny and the Mastermixers	"Swing The Mood"
October 14	Technotronic	"Pump Up the Jam"
October 21	Technotronic	"Pump Up the Jam"
October 28	Technotronic	"Pump Up the Jam"
November 4	Sydney Youngblood	"If Only I Could"
November 11	Sydney Youngblood	"If Only I Could"
November 18	Sydney Youngblood	"If Only I Could"
November 25	Sydney Youngblood	"If Only I Could"
December 2	Milli Vanilli	"Girl I'm Gonna Miss You"
December 9	Milli Vanilli	"Girl I'm Gonna Miss You"
December 16	Milli Vanilli	"Girl I'm Gonna Miss You"
December 23	Phil Collins	"Another Day in Paradise"
December 30	Phil Collins	"Another Day in Paradise"

== See also ==
- 1989 in music
