= List of number one hits in Belgium (1970) =

This is a list of the singles that topped the Ultratop 50 in the Flanders region of Belgium in 1970.

| Issue date | Song | Artist |
|---|---|---|
| 3 January | "Liefdeverdriet" | Will Tura |
| 10 January | "Liefdeverdriet" | Will Tura |
| 17 January | "Thanks" | J. Vincent Edward |
| 24 January | "Thanks" | J. Vincent Edward |
| 31 January | "Thanks" | J. Vincent Edward |
| 7 February | "Thanks" | J. Vincent Edward |
| 14 February | "Thanks" | J. Vincent Edward |
| 21 February | "Jingo" | Santana |
| 28 February | "Jingo" | Santana |
| 7 March | "Jingo" | Santana |
| 14 March | "Travelin' Band" | Creedence Clearwater Revival |
| 21 March | "Who'll Stop the Rain" | Creedence Clearwater Revival |
| 28 March | "Who'll Stop the Rain" | Creedence Clearwater Revival |
| 4 April | "Who'll Stop the Rain" | Creedence Clearwater Revival |
| 11 April | "Dear Ann" | George Baker Selection |
| 18 April | "Dear Ann" | George Baker Selection |
| 25 April | "All Kinds of Everything" | Dana |
| 2 May | "All Kinds of Everything" | Dana |
| 9 May | "Mademoiselle Ninette" | Soulful Dynamics |
| 16 May | "Mademoiselle Ninette" | Soulful Dynamics |
| 23 May | "El Condor Pasa (If I Could)" | Simon & Garfunkel |
| 30 May | "El Condor Pasa (If I Could)" | Simon & Garfunkel |
| 6 June | "El Condor Pasa (If I Could)" | Simon & Garfunkel |
| 13 June | "Keep On Smiling" | James Lloyd |
| 20 June | "Keep On Smiling" | James Lloyd |
| 27 June | "Keep On Smiling" | James Lloyd |
| 4 July | "Yellow River" | Christie |
| 11 July | "Never Marry a Railroad Man" | Shocking Blue |
| 18 July | "In the Summertime" | Mungo Jerry |
| 25 July | "In the Summertime" | Mungo Jerry |
| 1 August | "In the Summertime" | Mungo Jerry |
| 8 August | "In the Summertime" | Mungo Jerry |
| 15 August | "In the Summertime" | Mungo Jerry |
| 22 August | "In the Summertime" | Mungo Jerry |
| 29 August | "Are You Ready" | Pacific Gas & Electric |
| 5 September | "Are You Ready" | Pacific Gas & Electric |
| 12 September | "Are You Ready" | Pacific Gas & Electric |
| 19 September | "Are You Ready" | Pacific Gas & Electric |
| 26 September | "Are You Ready" | Pacific Gas & Electric |
| 3 October | "Are You Ready" | Pacific Gas & Electric |
| 10 October | "Comme j'ai toujours envie d'aimer" | Marc Hamilton |
| 17 October | "Comme j'ai toujours envie d'aimer" | Marc Hamilton |
| 24 October | "Comme j'ai toujours envie d'aimer" | Marc Hamilton |
| 31 October | "Comme j'ai toujours envie d'aimer" | Marc Hamilton |
| 7 November | "Comme j'ai toujours envie d'aimer" | Marc Hamilton |
| 14 November | "Comme j'ai toujours envie d'aimer" | Marc Hamilton |
| 21 November | "Comme j'ai toujours envie d'aimer" | Marc Hamilton |
| 28 November | "Comme j'ai toujours envie d'aimer" | Marc Hamilton |
| 5 December | "Rozen voor Sandra" | Jimmy Frey |
| 12 December | "Rozen voor Sandra" | Jimmy Frey |
| 19 December | "Rozen voor Sandra" | Jimmy Frey |
| 26 December | "Rozen voor Sandra" | Jimmy Frey |

== 1970 Year-End Chart ==
=== Singles ===
| Pos. | Title | Artist | Peak |
|---|---|---|---|
| 1 | "Ik benverliefd op jou" | Paul Severs | 2 |
| 2 | "Mademoiselle Ninette" | The Soulful Dynamics | 1 |
| 3 | "Keep On Smiling" | James Lloyd | 1 |
| 4 | "In the Summertime" | Mungo Jerry | 1 |
| 5 | "Comme j'ai toujours envie d'aimer" | Marc Hamilton | 1 |
| 6 | "Are You Ready" | Pacific Gas & Electric | 1 |
| 7 | "El Condor Pasa" | Simon & Garfunkel | 1 |
| 8 | "I Don't Believe in If Anymore" | Roger Whittaker | 2 |
| 9 | "Liefdeverdriet" | Will Tura | 1 |
| 10 | "Thanks" | J. Vincent Edward | 1 |

== See also ==
- 1970 in music
