= List of Ultratop 50 number-one singles of 2019 =

These hits topped the Ultratop 50 in 2019.

Flanders
Issue date	Song	Artist
5 January	"Sweet but Psycho"	Ava Max
12 January	"Sweet but Psycho"	Ava Max
19 January	"Sweet but Psycho"	Ava Max
26 January	"Sweet but Psycho"	Ava Max
2 February	"Sweet but Psycho"	Ava Max
9 February	"Sweet but Psycho"	Ava Max
16 February	"Sweet but Psycho"	Ava Max
23 February	"Sweet but Psycho"	Ava Max
2 March	"Sweet but Psycho"	Ava Max
9 March	"Sweet but Psycho"	Ava Max
16 March	"Giant"	Calvin Harris and Rag'n'Bone Man
23 March	"Giant"	Calvin Harris and Rag'n'Bone Man
30 March	"Giant"	Calvin Harris and Rag'n'Bone Man
6 April	"Giant"	Calvin Harris and Rag'n'Bone Man
13 April	"Giant"	Calvin Harris and Rag'n'Bone Man
20 April	"Giant"	Calvin Harris and Rag'n'Bone Man
27 April	"Giant"	Calvin Harris and Rag'n'Bone Man
4 May	"Old Town Road"	Lil Nas X
11 May	"Old Town Road"	Lil Nas X
18 May	"Old Town Road"	Lil Nas X
25 May	"Old Town Road"	Lil Nas X
1 June	"Old Town Road"	Lil Nas X
8 June	"Old Town Road"	Lil Nas X
15 June	"Old Town Road"	Lil Nas X
4 May	"Old Town Road"	Lil Nas X ft. Billy Ray Cyrus
29 June	"Old Town Road"	Lil Nas X ft. Billy Ray Cyrus
6 July	"Old Town Road"	Lil Nas X ft. Billy Ray Cyrus
13 July	"Old Town Road"	Lil Nas X ft. Billy Ray Cyrus
20 July	"Hoe het danst"	Marco Borsato, Armin van Buuren and Davina Michelle
27 July	"Hoe het danst"	Marco Borsato, Armin van Buuren and Davina Michelle
3 August	"Hoe het danst"	Marco Borsato, Armin van Buuren and Davina Michelle
10 August	"Hoe het danst"	Marco Borsato, Armin van Buuren and Davina Michelle
17 August	"Hoe het danst"	Marco Borsato, Armin van Buuren and Davina Michelle
24 August	"Hoe het danst"	Marco Borsato, Armin van Buuren and Davina Michelle
31 August	"Hoe het danst"	Marco Borsato, Armin van Buuren and Davina Michelle
7 September	"Hoe het danst"	Marco Borsato, Armin van Buuren and Davina Michelle
14 September	"Hoe het danst"	Marco Borsato, Armin van Buuren and Davina Michelle
21 September	"Hoe het danst"	Marco Borsato, Armin van Buuren and Davina Michelle
28 September	"Dance Monkey"	Tones and I
5 October	"Dance Monkey"	Tones and I
12 October	"Dance Monkey"	Tones and I
19 October	"Dance Monkey"	Tones and I
26 October	"Dance Monkey"	Tones and I
2 November	"Dance Monkey"	Tones and I
9 November	"Dance Monkey"	Tones and I
16 November	"Dance Monkey"	Tones and I
23 November	"Dance Monkey"	Tones and I
30 November	"Dance Monkey"	Tones and I
7 December	"Dance Monkey"	Tones and I
14 December	"Dance Monkey"	Tones and I
21 December	"Dance Monkey"	Tones and I
28 December	"Dance Monkey"	Tones and I

Wallonia
Issue date	Song	Artist
5 January	"Tout oublier"	Angèle featuring Roméo Elvis
12 January	"Tout oublier"	Angèle featuring Roméo Elvis
19 January	"Tout oublier"	Angèle featuring Roméo Elvis
26 January	"Tout oublier"	Angèle featuring Roméo Elvis
2 February	"Tout oublier"	Angèle featuring Roméo Elvis
9 February	"Tout oublier"	Angèle featuring Roméo Elvis
16 February	"Tout oublier"	Angèle featuring Roméo Elvis
23 February	"Tout oublier"	Angèle featuring Roméo Elvis
2 March	"Tout oublier"	Angèle featuring Roméo Elvis
9 March	"Tout oublier"	Angèle featuring Roméo Elvis
16 March	"Sweet but Psycho"	Ava Max
23 March	"Giant"	Calvin Harris and Rag'n'Bone Man
30 March	"Au DD"	PNL
6 April	"Au DD"	PNL
13 April	"Au DD"	PNL
20 April	"Au DD"	PNL
27 April	"Balance ton quoi"	Angèle
4 May	"Balance ton quoi"	Angèle
11 May	"Balance ton quoi"	Angèle
18 May	"Balance ton quoi"	Angèle
25 May	"Balance ton quoi"	Angèle
1 June	"Balance ton quoi"	Angèle
8 June	"Balance ton quoi"	Angèle
15 June	"Tricheur"	Nekfeu featuring Damso
22 June	"Old Town Road"	Lil Nas X
29 June	"Old Town Road"	Lil Nas X
6 July	"Old Town Road"	Lil Nas X
13 July	"Old Town Road"	Lil Nas X ft. Billy Ray Cyrus
20 July	"Old Town Road"	Lil Nas X ft. Billy Ray Cyrus
27 July	"Old Town Road"	Lil Nas X ft. Billy Ray Cyrus
3 August	"Old Town Road"	Lil Nas X ft. Billy Ray Cyrus
10 August	"Old Town Road"	Lil Nas X ft. Billy Ray Cyrus
17 August	"Old Town Road"	Lil Nas X ft. Billy Ray Cyrus
24 August	"Old Town Road"	Lil Nas X ft. Billy Ray Cyrus
31 August	"Old Town Road"	Lil Nas X ft. Billy Ray Cyrus
7 September	"Old Town Road"	Lil Nas X ft. Billy Ray Cyrus
14 September	"Señorita"	Shawn Mendes and Camila Cabello
21 September	"Señorita"	Shawn Mendes and Camila Cabello
28 September	"Señorita"	Shawn Mendes and Camila Cabello
5 October	"Dance Monkey"	Tones and I
12 October	"Dance Monkey"	Tones and I
19 October	"Dance Monkey"	Tones and I
26 October	"Dance Monkey"	Tones and I
2 November	"Dance Monkey"	Tones and I
9 November	"Dance Monkey"	Tones and I
16 November	"Dance Monkey"	Tones and I
23 November	"Dance Monkey"	Tones and I
30 November	"Dance Monkey"	Tones and I
7 December	"Dance Monkey"	Tones and I
14 December	"Dance Monkey"	Tones and I
21 December	"Dance Monkey"	Tones and I
28 December	"Dance Monkey"	Tones and I

Flanders ranking of most weeks at number 1
Position	Artist	Weeks #1
1	Tones and I	14
2	Lil Nas X	11
3	Ava Max	10
3	Marco Borsato	10
3	Armin van Buuren	10
3	Davina Michelle	10
4	Calvin Harris	7
4	Rag'n'Bone Man	7

Wallonia ranking of most weeks at number 1
Position	Artist	Weeks #1
1	Angèle	17
2	Tones and I	13
3	Lil Nas X	12
4	Roméo Elvis	10
5	PNL	4
6	Shawn Mendes	3
6	Camila Cabello	3
7	Ava Max	1
7	Calvin Harris	1
7	Rag'n'Bone Man	1
7	Nekfeu	1
7	Damso	1

== See also ==
- List of number-one albums of 2019 (Belgium)
- 2019 in music
