= Emma Bale =

Belgian singer

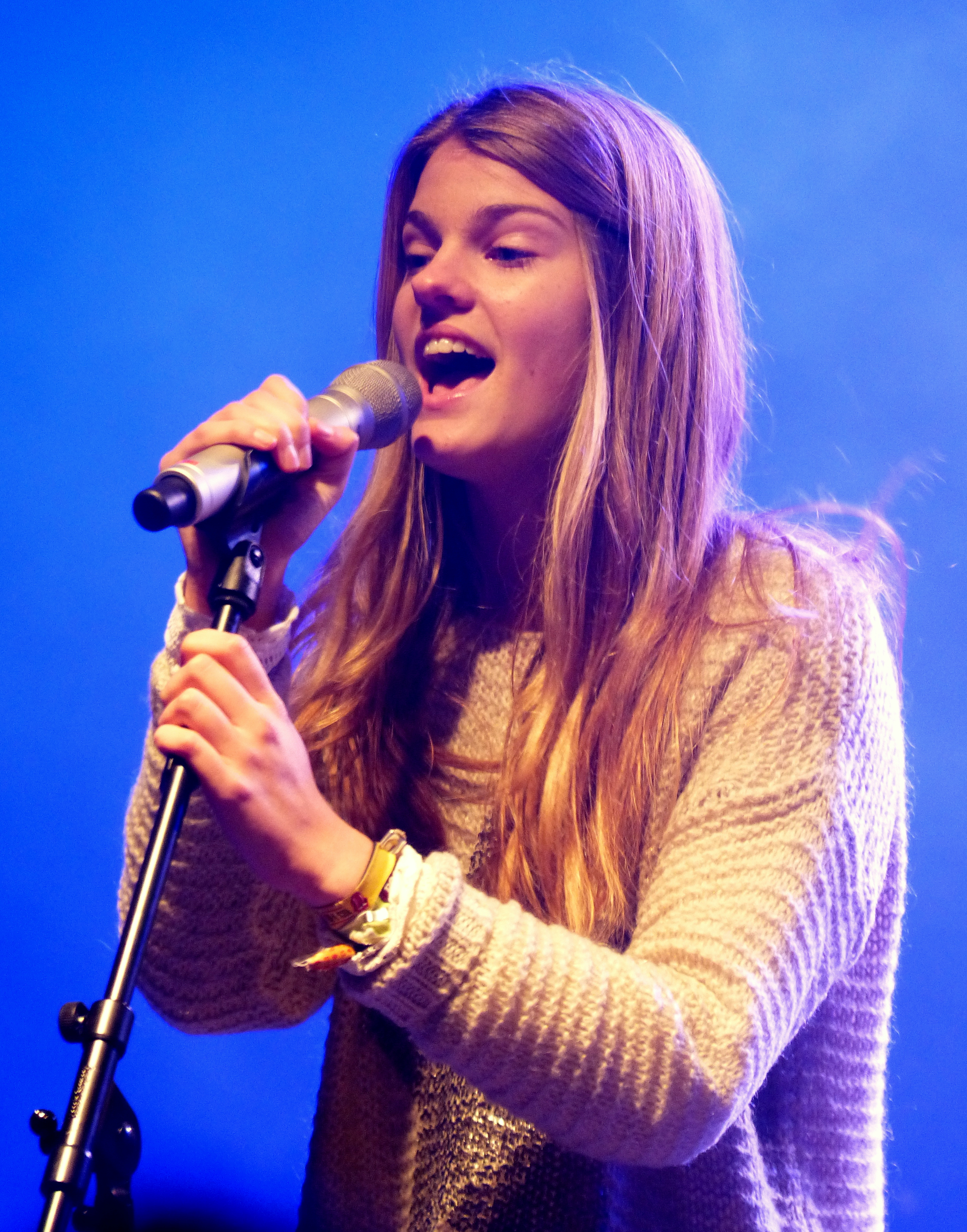
- Emma Bale in 2014

Background information
- Also known as: Emma Bale
- Born: Emma Balemans; 2 August 1999 (age 27); Belgium
- Genres: Pop
- Occupation: Singer
- Instrument: Vocals
- Years active: 2014–present
- Website: emmabale.be

Emma Bale (born Emma Balemans, 2 August 1999) is a Belgian singer, who is most notable for her cover of "All I Want" by Kodaline and her number-one song in Flanders, "Fortune Cookie".

In September 2015, Bale, alongside producer Hans Francken released an EP titled, My Untouched World, with six songs, including Bale's charted songs. "Run" was also remixed by Lost Frequencies.

Bale competed in Flanders' version of The Voice Kids, failing to advance to the finals after losing out in the sing-off.

== Discography ==
=== Studio albums ===
List of studio albums, with selected chart positions
| Title | Details | Peak chart positions |
| Title | Details | BEL (FL) |
|---|---|---|
| Retrospect | Released: 2 April 2021; Label: Sony Music; Format: Digital download, streaming | 3 |
| 333 | Released: 22 November 2024; Label: Warner; Format: Digital download, streaming | 137 |

=== Singles ===
| Year | Title | Peak chart positions | | | Album |
| Year | Title | BEL (Fl) | BEL (Wa) | NED | Album |
|---|---|---|---|---|---|
| 2015 | "All I Want" (Kodaline cover) | 3 | 67 | — | My World Untouched |
| 2015 | "Run" | 2 | 41 | — | My World Untouched |
| 2015 | "Fortune Cookie" (featuring Milow) | 1 | 20 | 14 | Non-album singles |
| 2016 | "Worth It" | 16 | 67 | — | Non-album singles |
| 2017 | "Curaçao" | 25 | — | — | Non-album singles |
| 2018 | "Cut Loose" | 20 | 29 | — | Non-album singles |
| 2019 | "Joan" | 79 | — | — | Non-album singles |
| 2020 | "Greedy" | 52 | — | — | Retrospect |
| 2021 | "Mind Games" | — | — | — | Retrospect |
| 2021 | "Boy Bye" | 62 | — | — | Retrospect |
| 2021 | "The Time Is Now" | 73 | — | — | Retrospect |
| 2021 | "Amsterdam" | 52 | — | — | Retrospect |
| 2024 | "Kijk niet weg" | 37 | — | — | Non-album single |
