= List of Ultratop 50 number-one singles of 2006 =

These hits topped the Ultratop 50 in 2006.

Issue Date	Artist	Song
January 7	Kippensoep All Stars	Kippensoep voor iedereen (Chicken Soup For Everyone)
January 14	Udo	Isn't it time
January 21	Udo	Isn't it time
January 28	Udo	Isn't it time
February 4	Udo	Isn't it time
February 11	Udo	Isn't it time
February 18	Udo	Isn't it time
February 25	Belle Perez	El mundo bailando
March 4	Belle Perez	El mundo bailando
March 11	Belle Perez	El mundo bailando
March 18	Kate Ryan	Je t'adore (I Adore You)
March 25	Kate Ryan	Je t'adore
April 1	Kate Ryan	Je t'adore
April 8	Kate Ryan	Je t'adore
April 15	Kate Ryan	Je t'adore
April 22	The Pussycat Dolls featuring will.i.am	Beep
April 29	The Black Eyed Peas	Pump It
May 6	Shakira featuring Wyclef Jean	Hips Don't Lie
May 13	Shakira featuring Wyclef Jean	Hips Don't Lie
May 20	Marco Borsato	Rood (Red)
May 27	Marco Borsato	Rood
June 3	Marco Borsato	Rood
June 10	Marco Borsato	Rood
June 17	Marco Borsato	Rood
June 24	Marco Borsato	Rood
July 1	Marco Borsato	Rood
July 8	Laura Lynn	Jij bent de mooiste (You Are the Most Beautiful)
July 15	Laura Lynn	Jij bent de mooiste
July 22	Laura Lynn	Jij bent de mooiste
July 29	Marco Borsato	Rood
August 5	Marco Borsato	Rood
August 12	Henkie	Lief klein konijntje (Cute Little Bunny)
August 19	Henkie	Lief klein konijntje
August 26	Henkie	Lief klein konijntje
September 2	Henkie	Lief klein konijntje
September 9	Henkie	Lief klein konijntje
September 16	Henkie	Lief klein konijntje
September 23	Bob Sinclar, Cutee-B, Dollarman and Big Ali	Rock This Party (Everybody Dance Now)
September 30	Bob Sinclar, Cutee-B, Dollarman and Big Ali	Rock This Party (Everybody Dance Now)
October 7	Bob Sinclar, Cutee-B, Dollarman and Big Ali	Rock This Party (Everybody Dance Now)
October 14	Bob Sinclar, Cutee-B, Dollarman and Big Ali	Rock This Party (Everybody Dance Now)
October 21	Scissor Sisters	I Don't Feel Like Dancin'
October 28	Scissor Sisters	I Don't Feel Like Dancin'
November 4	Scissor Sisters	I Don't Feel Like Dancin'
November 11	Scissor Sisters	I Don't Feel Like Dancin'
November 18	Scissor Sisters	I Don't Feel Like Dancin'
November 25	Scissor Sisters	I Don't Feel Like Dancin'
December 2	Scissor Sisters	I Don't Feel Like Dancin'
December 9	Clouseau	Vonken en vuur (Sparks and Fire)
December 16	Clouseau	Vonken en vuur
December 23	Clouseau	Vonken en vuur
December 30	Clouseau	Vonken en vuur

== See also ==
- 2006 in music
