= Ultratop 50 number-one hits of 2000 =

These hits topped the Ultratop 50 in 2000.

Date	Artist	Title
January 1	R. Kelly	"If I Could Turn Back the Hands of Time"
January 8	R. Kelly	"If I Could Turn Back the Hands of Time"
January 15	R. Kelly	"If I Could Turn Back the Hands of Time"
January 22	Bloodhound Gang	"The Bad Touch"
January 29	Bloodhound Gang	"The Bad Touch"
February 5	Bloodhound Gang	"The Bad Touch"
February 12	Bloodhound Gang	"The Bad Touch"
February 19	Bloodhound Gang	"The Bad Touch"
February 26	Metallica, Michael Kamen, and the San Francisco Symphony Orchestra	"Nothing Else Matters"
March 4	Metallica, Michael Kamen, and The San Francisco Symphony Orchestra	"Nothing Else Matters"
March 11	Metallica, Michael Kamen, and The San Francisco Symphony Orchestra	"Nothing Else Matters"
March 18	Da Boy Tommy	"Candyman"
March 25	Da Boy Tommy	"Candyman"
April 1	Da Boy Tommy	"Candyman"
April 8	Da Boy Tommy	"Candyman"
April 15	Bomfunk MC's	"Freestyler"
April 22	Bomfunk MC's	"Freestyler"
April 29	Bomfunk MC's	"Freestyler"
May 6	Bomfunk MC's	"Freestyler"
May 13	Bomfunk MC's	"Freestyler"
May 20	Bomfunk MC's	"Freestyler"
May 27	Bomfunk MC's	"Freestyler"
June 3	Milk Inc.	"Walk On Water"
June 10	Milk Inc.	"Walk On Water"
June 17	Bomfunk MC's	"Freestyler"
June 24	Bon Jovi	"It's My Life"
July 1	Bon Jovi	"It's My Life"
July 8	Bon Jovi	"It's My Life"
July 15	Bon Jovi	"It's My Life"
July 22	Live	"They Stood Up for Love"
July 29	Live	"They Stood Up for Love"
August 5	Liquid & Silvy	"Turn the Tide"
August 12	Liquid & Silvy	"Turn the Tide"
August 19	Liquid & Silvy	"Turn the Tide"
August 26	Krezip	"I Would Stay"
September 2	Krezip	"I Would Stay"
September 9	Krezip	"I Would Stay"
September 16	Krezip	"I Would Stay"
September 23	Krezip	"I Would Stay"
September 30	Krezip	"I Would Stay"
October 7	Krezip	"I Would Stay"
October 14	Krezip	"I Would Stay"
October 21	Krezip	"I Would Stay"
October 28	Mozaïek & Walter Grootaers	"Leef"
November 4	Mozaïek & Walter Grootaers	"Leef"
November 11	Mozaïek & Walter Grootaers	"Leef"
November 18	Mozaïek & Walter Grootaers	"Leef"
November 25	Mozaïek & Walter Grootaers	"Leef"
December 2	Mozaïek & Walter Grootaers	"Leef"
December 9	Mozaïek & Walter Grootaers	"Leef"
December 16	Twarres	"Wêr Bisto"
December 23	De Bewoners and Walter Grootaers	"Een Brief Voor Kerstmis"
December 30	De Bewoners and Walter Grootaers	"Een Brief Voor Kerstmis"

== See also ==
- 2000 in music
