= List of Ultratop 50 number-one singles of 2003 =

These hits topped the Ultratop 50 charts in 2003 (see 2003 in music).

Issue Date	Artist	Title
January 4	Eminem	"Lose Yourself"
January 11	Eminem	"Lose Yourself"
January 18	Eminem	"Lose Yourself"
January 25	Jasper Steverlinck & Steven & Stijn Kolacny	"Life on Mars?"
February 1	Jasper Steverlinck & Steven & Stijn Kolacny	"Life on Mars"
February 8	Jasper Steverlinck & Steven & Stijn Kolacny	"Life on Mars"
February 15	Jasper Steverlinck & Steven & Stijn Kolacny	"Life on Mars"
February 22	Jasper Steverlinck & Steven & Stijn Kolacny	"Life on Mars"
March 1	Jasper Steverlinck & Steven & Stijn Kolacny	"Life on Mars"
March 8	Jasper Steverlinck & Steven & Stijn Kolacny	"Life on Mars"
March 15	Jasper Steverlinck & Steven & Stijn Kolacny	"Life on Mars"
March 22	Céline Dion	"I Drove All Night"
March 29	Spring	"Spring"
April 5	Spring	"Spring"
April 12	Spring	"Spring"
April 19	Spring	"Spring"
April 26	Spring	"Spring"
May 3	Spring	"Spring"
May 10	Spring	"Spring"
May 17	Spring	"Spring"
May 24	Peter Evrard	"For You"
May 31	Peter Evrard	"For You"
June 7	Peter Evrard	"For You"
June 14	The Underdog Project and The Sunclub	"Summer Jam 2003"
June 21	The Underdog Project and The Sunclub	"Summer Jam 2003"
June 28	The Underdog Project and The Sunclub	"Summer Jam 2003"
July 5	The Underdog Project and The Sunclub	"Summer Jam 2003"
July 12	The Underdog Project and The Sunclub	"Summer Jam 2003"
July 19	The Underdog Project and The Sunclub	"Summer Jam 2003"
July 26	The Underdog Project and The Sunclub	"Summer Jam 2003"
August 2	The Underdog Project and The Sunclub	"Summer Jam 2003"
August 9	The Underdog Project and The Sunclub	"Summer Jam 2003"
August 16	Wim Soutaer	"Allemaal"
August 23	Wim Soutaer	"Allemaal"
August 30	Brahim	"Turn the Music Up"
September 6	Brahim	"Turn the Music Up"
September 13	Wim Soutaer	"Allemaal"
September 20	Brahim	"Turn the Music Up"
September 27	Lumidee	"Never Leave You (Uh Oooh, Uh Oooh)"
October 4	The Black Eyed Peas	"Where Is the Love?"
October 11	The Black Eyed Peas	"Where Is the Love?"
October 18	The Black Eyed Peas	"Where Is the Love?"
October 25	The Black Eyed Peas	"Where Is the Love?"
November 1	Sarah & Koen Wauters	"You Are the Reason"
November 8	Sarah & Koen Wauters	"You Are the Reason"
November 15	Sarah & Koen Wauters	"You Are the Reason"
November 22	Sarah & Koen Wauters	"You Are the Reason"
November 29	Sarah & Koen Wauters	"You Are the Reason"
December 6	Natalia	"I've Only Begun to Fight"
December 13	Natalia	"I've Only Begun to Fight"
December 20	The Black Eyed Peas	"Shut Up"
December 27	The Black Eyed Peas	"Shut Up"

== See also ==
- 2003 in music
