= List of number one hits in Belgium (1976) =

This is a list of the singles that topped the Ultratop 50 in the Flanders region of Belgium in 1976.

Issue date	Song	Artist
3 January	"Mississippi"	Pussycat
10 January	"Mississippi"	Pussycat
17 January	"Mississippi"	Pussycat
24 January	"Mississippi"	Pussycat
31 January	"Bohemian Rhapsody"	Queen
7 February	"Bohemian Rhapsody"	Queen
14 February	"Bohemian Rhapsody"	Queen
21 February	"Let's Twist Again"	Chubby Checker
28 February	"Let's Twist Again"	Chubby Checker
6 March	"Love Hurts"	Nazareth
13 March	"Love Hurts"	Nazareth
20 March	"Ich bin wie du"	Marianne Rosenberg
27 March	"Ich bin wie du"	Marianne Rosenberg
3 April	"Ich bin wie du"	Marianne Rosenberg
10 April	"Fernando"	ABBA
17 April	"Fernando"	ABBA
24 April	"Save Your Kisses for Me"	Brotherhood of Man
1 May	"Save Your Kisses for Me"	Brotherhood of Man
8 May	"Save Your Kisses for Me"	Brotherhood of Man
15 May	"Save Your Kisses for Me"	Brotherhood of Man
22 May	"Save Your Kisses for Me"	Brotherhood of Man
29 May	"Baretta's Theme"	Sammy Davis Jr
5 June	"Music"	John Miles
12 June	"Music"	John Miles
19 June	"Music"	John Miles
26 June	"Rocky"	Don Mercedes
3 July	"Rocky"	Don Mercedes
10 July	"Rocky"	Don Mercedes
17 July	"Arms of Mary"	Sutherland Brothers and Quiver
24 July	"Arms of Mary"	Sutherland Brothers and Quiver
31 July	"Arms of Mary"	Sutherland Brothers and Quiver
7 August	"Show Me the Way"	Peter Frampton
14 August	"Nice and Slow"	Jesse Green
21 August	"Nice and Slow"	Jesse Green
28 August	"Kiss and Say Goodbye"	The Manhattans
4 September	"Kiss and Say Goodbye"	The Manhattans
11 September	"Dancing Queen"	ABBA
18 September	"Dancing Queen"	ABBA
25 September	"Dancing Queen"	ABBA
2 October	"Dancing Queen"	ABBA
9 October	"Dancing Queen"	ABBA
16 October	"Dancing Queen"	ABBA
23 October	"Dancing Queen"	ABBA
30 October	"Daddy Cool"	Boney M.
6 November	"Daddy Cool"	Boney M.
13 November	"Daddy Cool"	Boney M.
20 November	"Daddy Cool"	Boney M.
27 November	"Heaven Must Be Missing an Angel"	Tavares
4 December	"Heaven Must Be Missing an Angel"	Tavares
11 December	"Money Money Money"	ABBA
18 December	"Money Money Money"	ABBA
25 December	"Money Money Money"	ABBA

== 1976 Year-End Chart ==
=== Singles ===
Pos.	Artist	Title	Peak
1	ABBA	"Fernando"	1
2	ABBA	"Dancing Queen"	1
3	Al Martino	"Volare"	2
4	Jimmy James & The Vagabonds	"Now Is the Time"	2
5	Tavares	"Heaven Must Be Missing an Angel"	1
6	Jesse Green	"Nice and Slow"	1
7	Boney M.	"Daddy Cool"	1
8	Will Tura	"Dona Carmela"	5
9	Peter Frampton	"Show Me the Way"	1
10	Brotherhood of Man	"Save Your Kisses for Me"	1

== See also ==
- 1976 in music
