= List of Ultratop 50 number-one singles of 2017 =

These hits topped the Ultratop 50 in 2017.

Flanders
Issue date	Song	Artist
7 January	"24K Magic"	Bruno Mars
14 January	"Hey Baby"	Dimitri Vegas & Like Mike vs. Diplo featuring Deb's Daughter
21 January	"Shape of You"	Ed Sheeran
28 January	"Shape of You"	Ed Sheeran
4 February	"Shape of You"	Ed Sheeran
11 February	"Shape of You"	Ed Sheeran
18 February	"Shape of You"	Ed Sheeran
25 February	"Shape of You"	Ed Sheeran
4 March	"Shape of You"	Ed Sheeran
11 March	"Shape of You"	Ed Sheeran
18 March	"Shape of You"	Ed Sheeran
25 March	"Shape of You"	Ed Sheeran
1 April	"Shape of You"	Ed Sheeran
8 April	"Shape of You"	Ed Sheeran
15 April	"Shape of You"	Ed Sheeran
22 April	"Shape of You"	Ed Sheeran
29 April	"Something Just Like This"	The Chainsmokers featuring Coldplay
6 May	"Shape of You"	Ed Sheeran
13 May	"Something Just Like This"	The Chainsmokers featuring Coldplay
20 May	"City Lights"	Blanche
27 May	"City Lights"	Blanche
3 June	"Despacito"	Luis Fonsi featuring Daddy Yankee
10 June	"Despacito"	Luis Fonsi featuring Daddy Yankee
17 June	"Despacito"	Luis Fonsi featuring Daddy Yankee
24 June	"Despacito"	Luis Fonsi featuring Daddy Yankee
1 July	"Despacito"	Luis Fonsi featuring Daddy Yankee
8 July	"Despacito"	Luis Fonsi featuring Daddy Yankee
15 July	"Despacito"	Luis Fonsi featuring Daddy Yankee
22 July	"Despacito"	Luis Fonsi featuring Daddy Yankee
29 July	"Despacito"	Luis Fonsi featuring Daddy Yankee
5 August	"Despacito"	Luis Fonsi featuring Daddy Yankee
12 August	"Despacito"	Luis Fonsi featuring Daddy Yankee
19 August	"Despacito"	Luis Fonsi featuring Daddy Yankee
26 August	"Where Did You Go (Summer Love)"	Regi
2 September	"Where Did You Go (Summer Love)"	Regi
9 September	"Where Did You Go (Summer Love)"	Regi
16 September	"Where Did You Go (Summer Love)"	Regi
23 September	"New Rules"	Dua Lipa
30 September	"New Rules"	Dua Lipa
7 October	"Perfect"	Ed Sheeran
14 October	"New Rules"	Dua Lipa
21 October	"New Rules"	Dua Lipa
28 October	"New Rules"	Dua Lipa
4 November	"Perfect" (including "Perfect Duet" and "Perfect Symphony")	Ed Sheeran (with Beyoncé / with Andrea Bocelli)
11 November	"Perfect" (including "Perfect Duet" and "Perfect Symphony")	Ed Sheeran (with Beyoncé / with Andrea Bocelli)
18 November	"Perfect" (including "Perfect Duet" and "Perfect Symphony")	Ed Sheeran (with Beyoncé / with Andrea Bocelli)
25 November	"Perfect" (including "Perfect Duet" and "Perfect Symphony")	Ed Sheeran (with Beyoncé / with Andrea Bocelli)
2 December	"Perfect" (including "Perfect Duet" and "Perfect Symphony")	Ed Sheeran (with Beyoncé / with Andrea Bocelli)
9 December	"Perfect" (including "Perfect Duet" and "Perfect Symphony")	Ed Sheeran (with Beyoncé / with Andrea Bocelli)
16 December	"Perfect" (including "Perfect Duet" and "Perfect Symphony")	Ed Sheeran (with Beyoncé / with Andrea Bocelli)
23 December	"Perfect" (including "Perfect Duet" and "Perfect Symphony")	Ed Sheeran (with Beyoncé / with Andrea Bocelli)
30 December	"Perfect" (including "Perfect Duet" and "Perfect Symphony")	Ed Sheeran (with Beyoncé / with Andrea Bocelli)

Wallonia
Issue date	Song	Artist
7 January	"Human"	Rag'n'Bone Man
14 January	"Rockabye"	Clean Bandit featuring Sean Paul and Anne-Marie
21 January	"Rockabye"	Clean Bandit featuring Sean Paul and Anne-Marie
28 January	"Rockabye"	Clean Bandit featuring Sean Paul and Anne-Marie
4 February	"Shape of You"	Ed Sheeran
11 February	"Shape of You"	Ed Sheeran
18 February	"Shape of You"	Ed Sheeran
25 February	"Shape of You"	Ed Sheeran
4 March	"Shape of You"	Ed Sheeran
11 March	"Shape of You"	Ed Sheeran
18 March	"Shape of You"	Ed Sheeran
25 March	"Shape of You"	Ed Sheeran
1 April	"Shape of You"	Ed Sheeran
8 April	"Shape of You"	Ed Sheeran
15 April	"Shape of You"	Ed Sheeran
22 April	"Shape of You"	Ed Sheeran
29 April	"Shape of You"	Ed Sheeran
6 May	"Shape of You"	Ed Sheeran
13 May	"Shape of You"	Ed Sheeran
20 May	"Despacito"	Luis Fonsi featuring Daddy Yankee
27 May	"Despacito"	Luis Fonsi featuring Daddy Yankee
3 June	"Despacito"	Luis Fonsi featuring Daddy Yankee
10 June	"Despacito"	Luis Fonsi featuring Daddy Yankee
17 June	"Despacito"	Luis Fonsi featuring Daddy Yankee
24 June	"Despacito"	Luis Fonsi featuring Daddy Yankee
1 July	"Despacito"	Luis Fonsi featuring Daddy Yankee
8 July	"Despacito"	Luis Fonsi featuring Daddy Yankee
15 July	"Despacito"	Luis Fonsi featuring Daddy Yankee
22 July	"Despacito"	Luis Fonsi featuring Daddy Yankee
29 July	"Despacito"	Luis Fonsi featuring Daddy Yankee
5 August	"Despacito"	Luis Fonsi featuring Daddy Yankee
12 August	"Despacito"	Luis Fonsi featuring Daddy Yankee
19 August	"Despacito"	Luis Fonsi featuring Daddy Yankee
26 August	"Despacito"	Luis Fonsi featuring Daddy Yankee
2 September	"Feels"	Calvin Harris featuring Pharrell Williams, Katy Perry and Big Sean
9 September	"Feels"	Calvin Harris featuring Pharrell Williams, Katy Perry and Big Sean
16 September	"Feels"	Calvin Harris featuring Pharrell Williams, Katy Perry and Big Sean
23 September	"Feels"	Calvin Harris featuring Pharrell Williams, Katy Perry and Big Sean
30 September	"Feels"	Calvin Harris featuring Pharrell Williams, Katy Perry and Big Sean
7 October	"Réseaux"	Niska
14 October	"Réseaux"	Niska
21 October	"Réseaux"	Niska
28 October	"Mwaka Moon"	Kalash featuring Damso
4 November	"Mwaka Moon"	Kalash featuring Damso
11 November	"Mwaka Moon"	Kalash featuring Damso
18 November	"Perfect" (including "Perfect Duet" and "Perfect Symphony")	Ed Sheeran (with Beyoncé / with Andrea Bocelli)
25 November	"Perfect" (including "Perfect Duet" and "Perfect Symphony")	Ed Sheeran (with Beyoncé / with Andrea Bocelli)
2 December	"Perfect" (including "Perfect Duet" and "Perfect Symphony")	Ed Sheeran (with Beyoncé / with Andrea Bocelli)
9 December	"Perfect" (including "Perfect Duet" and "Perfect Symphony")	Ed Sheeran (with Beyoncé / with Andrea Bocelli)
16 December	"Perfect" (including "Perfect Duet" and "Perfect Symphony")	Ed Sheeran (with Beyoncé / with Andrea Bocelli)
23 December	"Perfect" (including "Perfect Duet" and "Perfect Symphony")	Ed Sheeran (with Beyoncé / with Andrea Bocelli)
30 December	"Perfect" (including "Perfect Duet" and "Perfect Symphony")	Ed Sheeran (with Beyoncé / with Andrea Bocelli)

Flanders ranking of most weeks at number 1
Position	Artist	Weeks #1
1	Ed Sheeran	25
2	Daddy Yankee	12
2	Justin Bieber	12
2	Luis Fonsi	12
3	Dua Lipa	6
4	Regi	4
4	Beyoncé	4
5	Blanche	2
5	The Chainsmokers	2
5	Coldplay	2
6	Andrea Bocelli	2
6	Bruno Mars	1
6	Dimitri Vegas & Like Mike	1
6	Diplo	1
6	Deb's Daughter	1

Wallonia ranking of most weeks at number 1
Position	Artist	Weeks #1
1	Ed Sheeran	22
2	Luis Fonsi	15
2	Daddy Yankee	15
2	Justin Bieber	15
3	Calvin Harris	5
3	Pharrell Williams	5
3	Katy Perry	5
3	Big Sean	5
4	Beyoncé	4
5	Clean Bandit	3
5	Sean Paul	3
5	Anne-Marie	3
5	Niska	3
5	Kalash	3
5	Damso	3
6	Andrea Bocelli	2
7	Rag'n'Bone Man	1

== See also ==
- List of number-one albums of 2017 (Belgium)
- 2017 in music
