= Kiss Me Kiss Your Baby =

Single by Brotherhood of Man

from the album Love and Kisses from Brotherhood of Man
- B-side: "Put Out the Fire"
- Released: 16 May 1975
- Genre: Pop
- Length: 3:06
- Label: Dawn Records/Pye Records
- Songwriter: Barry Blue
- Producer: Tony Hiller

Brotherhood of Man singles chronology
"Spring of 1912" (1975)	"Kiss Me Kiss Your Baby" (1975)	"Save Your Kisses for Me" (1976)

"Kiss Me Kiss Your Baby" is a 1975 song by UK singer and songwriter Barry Blue. It became a European million seller for British pop group Brotherhood of Man that same year. It then became a South African top 10 hit for singer Geoff St. John, also in 1975.

== Background ==
The song was written by Barry Blue and originally recorded by him and released as a B-side to his single "You Make Me Happy (When I'm Blue)" in March 1975. The single proved to be his first single not to chart after a run of five top 30 hits in the UK.

Soon after, the song was recorded by upcoming pop group Brotherhood of Man who released it as a single in May 1975. It was released on Dawn Records in the UK and Pye Records in Europe. Although it failed to chart in the UK, it became a big seller in Europe, hitting the higher ends of the charts in the Netherlands, Austria and Germany. In Belgium it hit No.1 for five consecutive weeks, becoming the group's first chart-topping single. According to member Lee Sheriden the single sold over a million copies across Europe. The single also charted in New Zealand and Australia. In Belgium, the song became the sixth best-selling single of the year. In the Netherlands it became the 27th best-selling single of the year. It was also certified gold in France.

The song was later included on the group's album Love and Kisses, which was released in September 1975 in Europe and then in tandem with their Eurovision win in the UK the following year. The B-side to the single was the non-album track "Put Out the Fire", written by producer Tony Hiller and two of the group members. In Spain, the B-side was album track "Love Me for What I Am". The single was released in a variety of picture sleeves.

Record Mirror writer James Hamilton said the song was "powerfully chugging Drifter-ish", "should be good if it hits." In 1976, the same magazine recommended that the group re-release the song following the success of "Save Your Kisses for Me". They stated "'Kiss Me Kiss Your Baby' did well for them in Europe but didn't take off here. With current interest [it] would make them a good revitalised single and a natural successor to their current hit".

The song found further success when it was recorded by Johannesburg singer Geoff St. John, also in 1975. His version hit the South African charts in August and became a top ten hit in October, peaking at No.10.

== Track listing ==
Brotherhood of Man version

1. "Kiss Me Kiss Your Baby" (Barry Blue) 3:06
2. "Put Out the Fire" (Hiller/Sheriden/Lee) 2:25

== Chart performance ==
Brotherhood of Man version

Chart (1975-1976)	Peak position
Argentina	9
Australia (Kent Music Report)	92
Austria Singles chart	10
Belgium top 50 singles	1
German single chart	26
Netherlands top 100	2
New Zealand music charts	26
