= List of number one hits in Belgium (1978) =

This is a list of the singles that topped the Ultratop 50 in the Flanders region of Belgium in 1978.

Issue date	Song	Artist
7 January	"Mull of Kintyre"	Wings
14 January	"Mull of Kintyre"	Wings
21 January	"Mull of Kintyre"	Wings
28 January	"Mull of Kintyre"	Wings
4 February	"Mull of Kintyre"	Wings
11 February	"Mull of Kintyre"	Wings
18 February	"If I Had Words"	Scott Fitzgerald & Yvonne Keeley
25 February	"If I Had Words"	Scott Fitzgerald & Yvonne Keeley
4 March	"If I Had Words"	Scott Fitzgerald & Yvonne Keeley
11 March	"Take a Chance On Me"	ABBA
18 March	"I Can't Stand the Rain"	Eruption
25 March	"I Can't Stand the Rain"	Eruption
1 April	"Denis"	Blondie
8 April	"Denis"	Blondie
15 April	"Denis"	Blondie
22 April	"Denis"	Blondie
29 April	"Rivers of Babylon"	Boney M.
6 May	"Rivers of Babylon"	Boney M.
13 May	"Rivers of Babylon"	Boney M.
20 May	"Rivers of Babylon"	Boney M.
27 May	"Rivers of Babylon"	Boney M.
3 June	"Rivers of Babylon"	Boney M.
10 June	"Rivers of Babylon"	Boney M.
17 June	"Rivers of Babylon"	Boney M.
25 June	"Rivers of Babylon"	Boney M.
1 July	"Rivers of Babylon"	Boney M.
8 July	"Rivers of Babylon"	Boney M.
15 July	"You're the One That I Want"	John Travolta & Olivia Newton-John
22 July	"You're the One That I Want"	John Travolta & Olivia Newton-John
29 July	"You're the One That I Want"	John Travolta & Olivia Newton-John
5 August	"You're the One That I Want"	John Travolta & Olivia Newton-John
12 August	"You're the One That I Want"	John Travolta & Olivia Newton-John
19 August	"You're the One That I Want"	John Travolta & Olivia Newton-John
26 August	"You're the One That I Want"	John Travolta & Olivia Newton-John
2 September	"You're the One That I Want"	John Travolta & Olivia Newton-John
9 September	"You're the One That I Want"	John Travolta & Olivia Newton-John
16 September	"One for You, One for Me"	La Bionda
23 September	"You're the Greatest Lover"	Luv'
30 September	"You're the Greatest Lover"	Luv'
7 October	"You're the Greatest Lover"	Luv'
14 October	"Rasputin"	Boney M.
21 October	"Hopelessly Devoted to You"	Olivia Newton-John
28 October	"Hopelessly Devoted to You"	Olivia Newton-John
4 November	"Hopelessly Devoted to You"	Olivia Newton-John
11 November	"Hopelessly Devoted to You"	Olivia Newton-John
18 November	"Summer Nights"	John Travolta & Olivia Newton-John
25 November	"Dreadlock Holiday"	10cc
2 December	"Dreadlock Holiday"	10cc
9 December	"Dreadlock Holiday"	10cc
16 December	"Trojan Horse"	Luv'
23 December	"Trojan Horse"	Luv'
30 December	"Y.M.C.A."	Village People

== 1978 Year-End Chart ==
=== Singles ===
Pos.	Title	Artist	Peak
1	"You're the One That I Want"	John Travolta & Olivia Newton-John	1
2	"Follow Me"	Amanda Lear	3
3	"Rivers of Babylon"	Boney M.	1
4	"Only a Fool"	Mighty Sparrow and Byron Lee and the Dragonaires	2
5	"Summertime"	The Shake Spears	6
6	"Stayin' Alive"	Bee Gees	2
7	"Lay Love On You"	Luisa Fernandez	7
8	"Let's All Chant"	The Michael Zager Band	2
9	"Night Fever"	Bee Gees	3
10	"You're the Greatest Lover"	Luv'	1

== See also ==
- 1978 in music
