= Ultratop 50 number-one hits of 1996 =

These hits topped the Ultratop 50 in 1996.

Date	Artist	Song
January 6	Double Vision	Knockin'
January 13	Double Vision	Knockin'
January 20	Double Vision	Knockin'
January 27	Double Vision	Knockin'
February 3	Double Vision	Knockin'
February 10	Double Vision	Knockin'
February 17	Babylon Zoo	Spaceman
February 24	Babylon Zoo	Spaceman
March 2	Andrea Bocelli	Con te partirò
March 9	Andrea Bocelli	Con te partirò
March 16	Andrea Bocelli	Con te partirò
March 23	Andrea Bocelli	Con te partirò
March 30	Andrea Bocelli	Con te partirò
April 6	Andrea Bocelli	Con te partirò
April 13	Andrea Bocelli	Con te partirò
April 20	Andrea Bocelli	Con te partirò
April 27	Andrea Bocelli	Con te partirò
May 4	Andrea Bocelli	Con te partirò
May 11	Joan Osborne	One of us
May 18	2 Fabiola	Lift U up
May 25	2 Fabiola	Lift U up
June 1	2 Fabiola	Lift U up
June 8	2 Fabiola	Lift U up
June 15	Los Del Rio	Macarena
June 22	Los Del Rio	Macarena
June 29	Los Del Rio	Macarena
July 6	Los Del Rio	Macarena
July 13	Los Del Rio	Macarena
July 20	Los Del Rio	Macarena
July 27	The Fugees	Killing me softly
August 3	The Fugees	Killing me softly
August 10	The Fugees	Killing me softly
August 17	The Fugees	Killing me softly
August 24	The Fugees	Killing me softly
August 31	The Fugees	Killing me softly
September 7	The Fugees	Killing me softly
September 14	The Fugees	Killing me softly
September 21	Spice Girls	Wannabe
September 28	Spice Girls	Wannabe
October 5	Spice Girls	Wannabe
October 12	Spice Girls	Wannabe
October 19	Spice Girls	Wannabe
October 26	Rob de Nijs	Banger hart
November 2	Rob de Nijs	Banger hart
November 9	Céline Dion	It's all coming back to me now
November 16	Céline Dion	It's all coming back to me now
November 23	Céline Dion	It's all coming back to me now
November 30	Céline Dion	It's all coming back to me now
December 7	Céline Dion	It's all coming back to me now
December 14	Robert Miles & Maria Nayler	One and one
December 21	Robert Miles & Maria Nayler	One and one
December 28	Robert Miles & Maria Nayler	One and one

== See also ==
- 1996 in music
