= VRT Top 30 number-one hits of 1992 =

These hits topped the Ultratop 50 in the Flemish region of Belgium in 1992.

Date	Artist	Title
January 4	Michael Jackson	Black or White
January 11	Michael Jackson	Black or White
January 18	Nirvana	Smells Like Teen Spirit
January 25	Nirvana	Smells Like Teen Spirit
February 1	George Michael & Elton John	Don't Let the Sun Go Down On Me
February 8	George Michael & Elton John	Don't Let the Sun Go Down On Me
February 15	George Michael & Elton John	Don't Let the Sun Go Down On Me
February 22	George Michael & Elton John	Don't Let the Sun Go Down On Me
February 29	George Michael & Elton John	Don't Let the Sun Go Down On Me
March 7	George Michael & Elton John	Don't Let the Sun Go Down On Me
March 14	The Radios	She Goes Nana
March 21	The Radios	She Goes Nana
March 28	Michael Jackson	Remember the Time
April 4	Genesis	I Can't Dance
April 11	The Radios	She Goes Nana
April 18	The Radios	She Goes Nana
April 25	Red Hot Chili Peppers	Under the Bridge
May 2	Red Hot Chili Peppers	Under the Bridge
May 9	Mr. Big	To Be with You
May 16	Mr. Big	To Be with You
May 23	Double You	Please Don't Go
May 30	Double You	Please Don't Go
June 6	Double You	Please Don't Go
June 13	Double You	Please Don't Go
June 20	Snap!	Rhythm Is a Dancer
June 27	Snap!	Rhythm Is a Dancer
July 4	Kris Kross	Jump
July 11	Guns N' Roses	Knockin' on Heaven's Door
July 18	Guns N' Roses	Knockin' on Heaven's Door
July 25	Guns N' Roses	Knockin' on Heaven's Door
August 1	Guns N' Roses	Knockin' on Heaven's Door
August 8	Guns N' Roses	Knockin' on Heaven's Door
August 15	Guns N' Roses	Knockin' on Heaven's Door
August 22	Dr. Alban	It's My Life
August 29	Dr. Alban	It's My Life
September 5	Dr. Alban	It's My Life
September 12	Dr. Alban	It's My Life
September 19	Dr. Alban	It's My Life
September 26	Roxette	How Do You Do!
October 3	Dr. Alban	It's My Life
October 10	Vaya Con Dios	Heading For a Fall
October 17	Vaya Con Dios	Heading For a Fall
October 24	Vaya Con Dios	Heading For a Fall
October 31	Vaya Con Dios	Heading For a Fall
November 7	Vaya Con Dios	Heading For a Fall
November 14	Brian May	Too Much Love Will Kill You
November 21	Vaya Con Dios	Heading for a fall
November 28	Inner Circle	Sweat (A La La La La Long)
December 5	Inner Circle	Sweat (A La La La La Long)
December 12	Inner Circle	Sweat (A La La La La Long)
December 19	One More Time	Highland
December 26	One More Time	Highland

== See also ==
- 1992 in music
