= List of Ultratop 50 number-one singles of 2010 =

These singles topped the Ultratop 50 in 2010.

Issue date	Song	Artist
2 January	"Meet Me Halfway"	The Black Eyed Peas
9 January	"Meet Me Halfway"	The Black Eyed Peas
16 January	"Envoi"	Absynthe Minded
23 January	"Envoi"	Absynthe Minded
30 January	"Heads Will Roll"	Yeah Yeah Yeahs
6 February	"Hallelujah"	Natalia and Gabriel Ríos
13 February	"Hallelujah"	Natalia and Gabriel Ríos
20 February	"Hallelujah"	Natalia and Gabriel Ríos
27 February	"We Are the World 25 for Haiti"	Artists for Haiti
6 March	"Storm"	Milk Inc.
13 March	"Hallelujah"	Natalia and Gabriel Ríos
20 March	"Hallelujah"	Natalia and Gabriel Ríos
27 March	"Me and My Guitar"	Tom Dice
3 April	"Telephone"	Lady Gaga featuring Beyoncé
10 April	"Telephone"	Lady Gaga featuring Beyoncé
17 April	"Telephone"	Lady Gaga featuring Beyoncé
24 April	"Telephone"	Lady Gaga featuring Beyoncé
1 May	"Telephone"	Lady Gaga featuring Beyoncé
8 May	"Alors on danse"	Stromae
15 May	"Alors on danse"	Stromae
22 May	"Alors on danse"	Stromae
29 May	"Dos cervezas"	Tom Waes
5 June	"Me and My Guitar"	Tom Dice
12 June	"Me and My Guitar"	Tom Dice
19 June	"Alors on danse"	Stromae
26 June	"Waka Waka"	Shakira featuring Freshlyground
3 July	"Waka Waka"	Shakira featuring Freshlyground
10 July	"Waka Waka"	Shakira featuring Freshlyground
17 July	"We No Speak Americano"	Yolanda Be Cool vs. DCUP
24 July	"Waka Waka"	Shakira featuring Freshlyground
31 July	"We No Speak Americano"	Yolanda Be Cool vs. DCUP
7 August	"We No Speak Americano"	Yolanda Be Cool vs. DCUP
14 August	"We No Speak Americano"	Yolanda Be Cool vs. DCUP
21 August	"We No Speak Americano"	Yolanda Be Cool vs. DCUP
28 August	"Waka Waka"	Shakira featuring Freshlyground
4 September	"No Sound But the Wind"	Editors
11 September	"No Sound But the Wind"	Editors
18 September	"Bromance"	Tim Berg
25 September	"Love the Way You Lie"	Eminem featuring Rihanna
2 October	"I Need a Dollar"	Aloe Blacc
9 October	"I Need a Dollar"	Aloe Blacc
16 October	"Barbra Streisand"	Duck Sauce
23 October	"Barbra Streisand"	Duck Sauce
30 October	"Barbra Streisand"	Duck Sauce
6 November	"Barbra Streisand"	Duck Sauce
13 November	"Barbra Streisand"	Duck Sauce
20 November	"Barbra Streisand"	Duck Sauce
27 November	"The Time (Dirty Bit)"	The Black Eyed Peas
4 December	"The Time (Dirty Bit)"	The Black Eyed Peas
11 December	"The Time (Dirty Bit)"	The Black Eyed Peas
18 December	"The Time (Dirty Bit)"	The Black Eyed Peas
25 December	"The Time (Dirty Bit)"	The Black Eyed Peas

== See also ==
- 2010 in music
