= Sharif Dean =

- Born: Cherif-Eddine Kharroubi; August 14, 1947; Casablanca, Morocco
- Died: 14 February 2019 (aged 71) Oran, Algeria
- Genres: World
- Occupations: Singer-songwriter, composer
- Years active: 1972–2019

Sharif Dean (August 14, 1947 — February 14, 2019), stage name Cherif-Eddine Kharroubi, was a French-Algerian singer and composer. His most famous titles are "Do you love me?" (also versioned into Spanish) and "Goodbye and Thank You", both recorded with the collaboration of the Belgian singer Evelyne D'Haese and released in 1973.

== Career ==
Born in Morocco to a French mother and an Algerian father, Dean moved to Paris as a child, where he came into contact with modern music, winning the Radio Monte Carlo talent show in 1964. He studied in Brussels and obtained a university degree in philosophy and literature in 1971, later dedicating himself to an artistic career. His first single, Mary-Ann (released in 1972 and produced by Belgian Jean Huysmans), was not a sales success. A year later, he gained prominence with Do You Love Me?, which featured singer Evelyne D'Haese, a Belgian singer who often worked in the studio, including for Luc Hensill. Dean received a gold record for selling 100,000 copies of his single Do you love me? in Belgium. The single also reached number one in Rio de Janeiro. The song ranked first on Belgian radio and also stood out on the music charts in France, the Netherlands, West Germany and Brazil. On the Dutch Top 40's all-time chart for love songs, the cover ranked number 30. This was followed by Plus de Problèmes, a much lesser success and only in Belgium.

In 1974, he released No More Troubles, another well-known single in his career.

== Death ==
Sharif Dean died on February 14, 2019, in Oran, Algeria, after complications from diabetes that had affected him for some time.

== Singles in English ==
- Do You Love Me? (1972)
- Anna Marianna/ Mary Ann (1972)
- No More Troubles (1973)
- So Good (To Be Together) (1974)
- Stand By Me (1975)
- Hey Baby/ He'll Have To Go (1976)
- Dance Girl Dance (1984)
- Sleepless (In Your Dreams of Love) (1985)
