= Nonante-Cinq Tour =

2022–23 concert tour by Angèle

- Tour by Angèle
- International dates poster
- Location: France; Belgium; Spain; Switzerland; Canada; United States; United Kingdom; Netherlands
- Associated album: Nonante-Cinq
- Start date: 20 April 2022
- End date: 26 May 2023
- No. of shows: 62

Angèle concert chronology
- Brol Tour (2018–2020); Nonante-Cinq Tour (2022–2023); Instinct Tour (2027)

The Nonante-Cinq Tour was the second concert tour by Belgian singer Angèle in support of her second studio album, Nonante-Cinq (2021). The tour visited cities in France, Spain, Switzerland, Canada, the United States, the United Kingdom, the Netherlands and the singer's home country, Belgium. Dates were officially announced on 27 October 2021 and tickets went on sale 2 days later. The run of shows began on 20 April 2022 at the Reims Arena in Reims, and concluded on 26 May 2023 in Amsterdam.

== Background ==
On October 27, 2021, Angèle announced the Nonante-Cinq Tour via her Twitter account. An announcement about tickets going on sale was posted on the singer's Instagram two days after the initial announcement. The then announced tour was originally announced to have 24 dates and was supposed to conclude on December 12, 2022, but four more dates in Brussels and a new date in Antwerp were added due to high demand. Three festival appearances were also announced to be part of the tour, adding an additional three dates in Barcelona, Aix-les-Bains, and Nîmes.

== Setlist ==
This set list is representative of the show on 20 April 2022 in Reims. It is not representative of all concerts for the duration of the tour.

1. "Plus de sens"
2. "Tu me regardes"
3. "Pensées positives”
4. "Oui ou non"
5. ”Tout oublier"
6. "On s'habitue"
7. "Profite"
8. "Solo"
9. "Ta reine"
10. "Perdus"
11. "Les Matins"
12. ”Jalousie"
13. "Tempête"
14. "Taxi"
15. "Flemme"
16. "Mauvais rêves"
17. "Libre"
18. "La Loi de Murphy" / "Je veux tes yeux"
19. "Flou"
20. "Fever"
21. "Balance ton quoi"
22. "Démons"
  Encore
23. "Bruxelles je t'aime"

== Shows ==
Date	City	Country	Venue
Europe
20 April 2022	Reims	France	Reims Arena
4 May 2022	Bordeaux	France	Arkéa Arena
5 May 2022	Toulouse	France	Zénith de Toulouse Métropole
6 May 2022	Poitiers	France	Arena Futuroscope
10 May 2022	Marseille	France	Le Dôme de Marseille
11 May 2022	Nice	France	Palais Nikaia
12 May 2022	Grenoble	France	Palais des Sports
16 May 2022	Brussels	Belgium	Forest National
18 May 2022	Nantes	France	Zénith Nantes Métropole
4 June 2022	Saint-Laurent-de-Cuves	France	Papillons de Nuit Festival
5 June 2022	Paris	France	We Love Green Festival
11 June 2022	Barcelona	Spain	Primavera Sound Festival
23 June 2022	Ruoms	France	Ardèche Aluna Festival
30 June 2022	Arras	France	Main Square Festival
2 July 2022	Nort-sur-Erdre	France	Nuit de l'Erdre Festival
3 July 2022	Clermont-Ferrand	France	Europavox Festival
7 July 2022	Aix-les-Bains	France	Musilac Music Festival
8 July 2022	Albi	France	Pause Guitare Festival
9 July 2022	Argelès-sur-Mer	France	Les Déferlantes Festival
14 July 2022	La Rochelle	France	Francofolies Festival
15 July 2022	Carhaix	France	Vieilles Charrues Festival
16 July 2022	Dour	Belgium	Dour Festival
20 July 2022	Nîmes	France	Nîmes Festival
21 July 2022	Nyon	Switzerland	Paléo Festival
27 July 2022	Colmar	France	Foire aux Vins Festival
30 July 2022	Luxey	France	Musicalarue Festival
31 July 2022	Gignac	France	Ecaussystème Festival
7 October 2022	Bordeaux	France	Arkéa Arena
12 October 2022	Angers	France	Arena Loire
13 October 2022	Nantes	France	Zénith Nantes Métropole
18 October 2022	Caen	France	Zénith de Caen
19 October 2022	Rouen	France	Zénith de Rouen
20 October 2022	Amiens	France	Zénith d'Amiens
25 October 2022	Aix-en-Provence	France	Arena du Pays d'Aix
26 October 2022	Toulon	France	Zénith Oméga de Toulon
27 October 2022	Montpellier	France	Sud de France Arena
3 November 2022	Lyon	France	Halle Tony Garnier
4 November 2022	Lyon	France	Halle Tony Garnier
8 November 2022	Rennes	France	Musikhall
9 November 2022	Limoges	France	Zénith Limoges Métropole
10 November 2022	Pau	France	Zénith de Pau
21 November 2022	Lille	France	Zénith de Lille
22 November 2022	Lille	France	Zénith de Lille
25 November 2022	Amnéville	France	Le Galaxie
26 November 2022	Strasbourg	France	Zénith de Strasbourg
2 December 2022	Nanterre	France	Paris La Défense Arena
3 December 2022	Nanterre	France	Paris La Défense Arena
10 December 2022	Antwerp	Belgium	Sportpaleis
19 December 2022	Brussels	Belgium	Forest National
20 December 2022	Brussels	Belgium	Forest National
21 December 2022	Brussels	Belgium	Forest National
22 December 2022	Brussels	Belgium	Forest National
North America
6 April 2023	Vancouver	Canada	Queen Elizabeth Theatre
8 April 2023	Seattle	United States	Showbox SoDo
27 April 2023	Quebec City	Canada	Videotron Centre
29 April 2023	Montreal	Canada	Bell Centre
30 April 2023	Montreal	Canada	Bell Centre
2 May 2023	Boston	United States	Roadrunner
5 May 2023	New York City	United States	Terminal 5
6 May 2023	New York City	United States	Terminal 5
Europe
23 May 2023	London	England	OVO Arena Wembley
26 May 2023	Amsterdam	Netherlands	AFAS Live
