= 2019 NRJ Music Awards =

18th edition of French music event

- Date: November 9, 2019
- Location: Palais des Festivals, Cannes
- Country: France
- Hosted by: Nikos Aliagas
- Website: nrj.fr/music-awards

Television/radio coverage
- Network: TF1; NRJ
- Runtime: 2:28:00

The 2019 NRJ Music Award was the 18th edition of the NRJ Music Awards, which took place on November 9, 2019, at the Palais des Festivals, in Cannes, France. The ceremony was broadcast live on TF1 and NRJ, and hosted by Nikos Aliagas.

== Performances ==
Artist(s)	Song(s)
Jonas Brothers	"Sucker"
Angèle	"Balance ton quoi"
Tones and I	"Dance Monkey"
Soprano; Vincenzo	"Le coach"
Aya Nakamura	"Pookie"
Lewis Capaldi; Clara Luciani	"Someone You Loved"
Kendji Girac; Claudio Capéo	"Que Dieu me pardonne"
Vitaa; Slimane	"Ça va, ça vient"
M. Pokora	Medley: "Les Planètes" "Elle me contrôle" "De retour" "Juste une photo de toi" "À nos actes manqués" "On est là" "Cette année-là" "Tombé"
Bigflo et Oli	"Promesses"
Pedro Capó; Vitaa	"Calma"
Christophe Maé	"Les gens"
Roméo Elvis	"Soleil"
Bilal Hassani	"Roi"
Trois Cafés Gourmands	"À nos souvenirs"
Dadju	"Compliqué"
Sam Smith	"Dancing with a Stranger"
Kiddy Smile	"Let a B!tch Know"
Jenifer; Slimane	"Les choses simples"
Clara Luciani	"La Grenade"
Maëlle	"Toutes les machines ont un cœur"
Boulevard des Airs	"Allez reste"
Lenni-Kim	"Minuit"
Jonas Brothers	"Only Human"

== Winners and nominees ==
Francophonic Male Artist (presented by (France) Ingrid Chauvin and (France) Frédéric Diefenthal)	Francophonic Female Artist (presented by (France) Maëlle and (France) Bilal Hassani)
(France) M. Pokora - 26 %; (France) Soprano - 19 %; (France) Slimane - 17 %; (France) Dadju - 14 %; (Democratic Republic of the Congo) Gims - 14 %; (France) Kendji Girac - 10 %	(Belgium) Angèle - 44 %; (France) / (Mali) Aya Nakamura - 19 %; (France) Jenifer - 16 %; (France) Vitaa - 13 %; (France) Clara Luciani - 8 %
International Male Artist (presented by (France) Vitaa and (France) Slimane)	International Female Artist (presented by (France) Salif Gueye and (France) Vaimalama Chaves)
(United Kingdom) Ed Sheeran - 43 %; (Canada) Shawn Mendes - 37 %; (United States) Post Malone - 10 %; (United Kingdom) Sam Smith - 6 %; (Puerto Rico) Pedro Capó - 4 %	(United States) Ariana Grande - 39 %; (Cuba) / (United States) Camila Cabello - 23 %; (United States) Lady Gaga - 23 %; (United States) Taylor Swift - 8 %; (United States) P!nk - 7 %
Francophonic Breakthrough Act (presented by (France) Dadju)	International Breakthrough Act (presented by (France) Philippine and (Republic of Ireland) Gavin James)
(France) Bilal Hassani - 26%; (Belgium) Roméo Elvis - 24%; (Canada) Lenni-Kim - 19%; (France) Trois Cafés Gourmands - 15%; (France) Maëlle - 10%; (France) Boulevard des Airs - 6%	(United States) Billie Eilish - 39%; (United States) Ava Max - 23%; (United States) Lil Nas X - 20%; (Scotland) Lewis Capaldi - 9%; (United Kingdom) Jorja Smith - 6%; (Spain) Mabel - 3%
Francophonic Group/Duo (presented by (France) Jenifer and (France) The Avener)	International Group/Duo (presented by (France) Clément Albertini, (France) Soprano and (France) Kendji Girac)
(France) Bigflo et Oli - 38%; (France) Angèle & Roméo Elvis - 27%; (France) Vitaa & Slimane - 22%; (France) Kendji Girac & Claudio Capéo - 11%; (France) Philippine & (Republic of Ireland) Gavin James - 2%	(United States) Lady Gaga and Bradley Cooper - 35 %; (Canada) Shawn Mendes and (Cuba) / (United States) Camila Cabello - 32 %; (United Kingdom) Ed Sheeran feat. (Canada) Justin Bieber - 12 %; (United States) Lil Nas X feat. Billy Ray Cyrus - 11 %; (United States) Jonas Brothers - 7 %; (Puerto Rico) Pedro Capó and (Puerto Rico) Farruko feat. (United States) Alicia Keys - 3 %
Video of the Year (presented by (France) Clara Morgane and (France) / (Portugal) Chris Marques)	DJ of the Year (presented by (France) Kiddy Smile and (France) Iris Mittenaere)
(France) Bigflo et Oli - "Promesses" - 19,38 %; (Belgium) Angèle feat. Roméo Elvis - "Tout oublier" - 19,17 %; (France) Soprano feat. Vincenzo - "Le coach" - 16,86 %; (France) Billie Eilish - "Bad Guy" - 15,07 %; (United Kingdom) Ed Sheeran feat. (Canada) Justin Bieber - "I Don't Care" - 8,99 %; (United States) Lil Nas X feat. Billy Ray Cyrus - "Old Town Road" - 8,93 %; (France) Black M - "Mon beau frère" - 6,02 %; (United States) Jonas Brothers - "Sucker" - 4,95 %	(France) DJ Snake - 45%; (France) David Guetta - 19%; (Netherlands) Martin Garrix - 13%; (United Kingdom) Calvin Harris - 10%; (France) Ofenbach - 8%; (Netherlands) Armin van Buuren - 5%
Francophonic Song of the Year (presented by (France) Joyce Jonathan and (France) Lola Dubini)	International Song of the Year (presented by (France) Sébastien Cauet and (France) Manu Levy)
(Belgium) Angèle feat. Roméo Elvis - "Tout oublier" - 32 %; (France) Soprano feat. Vincenzo - "Le coach" - 18 %; (France) / (Mali) Aya Nakamura - "Pookie" - 15 %; (France) Vitaa and Slimane - "Ça va, ça vient" - 15 %; (France) Kendji Girac and Claudio Capéo - "Que Dieu me pardonne" - 11 %; (France) Dadju - "Compliqué" - 9 %	(Canada) Shawn Mendes & (Cuba) / (United States) Camila Cabello - "Señorita" - 48 %; (United States) Lil Nas X feat. Billy Ray Cyrus - "Old Town Road" - 17 %; (France) DJ Snake feat. (Colombia) J Balvin and (United States) Tyga - "Loco Contigo" - 10 %; (Scotland) Lewis Capaldi - "Someone You Loved" - 10 %; (United Kingdom) Calvin Harris feat. (United Kingdom) Rag'n'Bone Man - "Giant" - 8 %; (Puerto Rico) Pedro Capó and (Puerto Rico) Farruko feat. (United States) Alicia Keys - "Calma" - 7 %
Francophonic Performance of the Night (presented by (France) Nikos Aliagas)	Award of Merit (presented by (France) Nikos Aliagas)
(France) Vitaa and Slimane - "Ça va, ça vient" - 18 %; (France) Bigflo et Oli - "Promesses" - 16 %; (France) Soprano feat. Vincenzo - "Le coach" - 16 %; (France) Jenifer feat. Slimane - "Les choses simples" - 14 %; (Belgium) Angèle - "Balance ton quoi" - 9 %; (France) / (Mali) Aya Nakamura - "Pookie" - 9 %; (France) Clara Luciani - "La grenade" - 7 %; (France) Kendji Girac & Claudio Capéo - "Que Dieu me pardonne" - 6 %; (France) Dadju - "Compliqué" - 5 %	(United States) Jonas Brothers
Diamond certified song (presented by (France) Nikos Aliagas)	Platinum certified album (presented by (France) Nikos Aliagas)
(Puerto Rico) Pedro Capó and (Puerto Rico) Farruko feat. (United States) Alicia Keys - "Calma"	(France) Vitaa and Slimane - Versus
