= Allez Allez =

Belgian funk band

- Origin: Brussels, Belgium
- Genres: Funk; soul; rock; pop
- Years active: 1981–1984; 2017–present
- Members: Kris Debusscher (guitar); Marka (bass); Robbie Bindels (drums); Roland Bindi (percussion); Paul Curtiz (guitar); Thom Dewatt (keyboards); Kyoko Baertsoen (vocals); Marie Delsaux (vocals)
- Past members: Nicolas Fransolet (guitar); Sarah Osborne (vocals); Jackie Irwin (vocals)

Allez Allez is a Belgian funk band founded in 1981. They disbanded in 1985 but subsequently reformed with a line-up change for several concerts in 2017.

== History ==
On the verge of an international breakthrough in 1981, funky Belgian new wave band Marine lost their singer Marc Marine while in London to record a Peel session. Quickly replaced by Sarah Osborne of Repetition, they recorded the planned Peel session and changed their name to Allez Allez.

The group had local hits with "She's Stirring Up", "Allez Allez" and "African Queen", the latter a tribute to Grace Jones. Their mini-album African Queen achieved gold status and earned them an appearance at the Torhout-Werchter festival in 1982.

The band then signed with major label Virgin and released the polished pop album Promises in November 1982, though Osborne subsequently left the group and married Glenn Gregory of Heaven 17. American singer Jackie Irwin replaced Osborne, but mainstream success still eluded the band.

Under the name Marka, their bass player later became a well-known singer in French music circles. He is also the father of the acclaimed singers Angèle and Roméo Elvis. Christian Debusscher and Nico Fransolet became members of Les Snuls, and both have subsequently worked as directors.

Members of the band decided to reunite to do some gigs in 2017, including their first appearance at the Les Francofolies de Spa festival in July. This was followed by several other dates. As two key members - Fransolet and Osborne - declined to be involved, the group chose to work with two female singers, Kyoko Bartsoen (who had sung with Hooverphonic) and Marie, and Paul Curtiz who also joined them on guitar.

At the same time, bassist Marka wrote a book of memoirs about his time in the band, Allez Allez, published by Lamiroy.

== Discography ==
=== Albums ===
- African Queen (1981 - EMI/Scalp)
- Promises (1982 - Virgin)
- African Queen + Promises (1997 - Virgin CD)
- Best of Allez Allez (2008 - Eskimo CD)
- Promises + African Queen (2013 - Les Disques du Crepuscule CD)

=== Singles ===
- "She's Stirring Up" (1981), Scalp
- "Allez Allez/African Queen" (1981), Scalp
- "Valley of the Kings/Wrap Your Legs" (1982), Virgin
- "Flesh and Blood/The Time You Cost Me" (1982), Virgin
- "Don't Bother Me/Strange People" (1984), Vogue
- "Boom Boom/The Brain" (1984), Sounds of the Future
