= Fever (Dua Lipa and Angèle song) =

2020 single by Dua Lipa and Angèle

Single by Dua Lipa featuring Angèle (Note: Angèle is credited as a featured artist on the Austrian, German and Swiss release of "Fever".)

from the album Future Nostalgia (French edition)
- Language: English; French
- Released: 29 October 2020
- Recorded: 2020
- Studio: TaP (London, UK); Zenseven (Los Angeles, US); La Vague (Paris, France)
- Genre: Dance-pop; deep house; nu-disco
- Length: 2:36
- Label: Warner
- Songwriters: Dua Lipa; Ian Kirkpatrick; Julia Michaels; Caroline Ailin; Angèle; Jacob Kasher Hindlin
- Producer: Ian Kirkpatrick

Dua Lipa singles chronology
| "Levitating" (2020) | "Fever" (2020) | "Prisoner" (2020) |

Angèle singles chronology
| "Ta reine" (2020) | "Fever" (2020) | "Bruxelles je t'aime" (2021) |

Music video
- "Fever" on YouTube

"Fever" is a song by English singer Dua Lipa featuring Belgian singer Angèle from the French edition of the former's second studio album, Future Nostalgia (2020). The song was written by the singers alongside Caroline Ailin, Jacob Kasher Hindlin, Julia Michaels and the sole producer Ian Kirkpatrick. It was originally intended to be placed on the standard edition of the album as a solo version by Lipa. The song was released for digital download and streaming on 29 October 2020, through Warner Records as a single. It is a dance-pop, deep house and nu-disco song with 2000s Eurodance elements and a disco-pop production that features Afrobeat-tinged synth-pop beats. Lyrically, the song uses a metaphor of sickness to demonstrate an infatuation and addresses the excitement of being with someone where one almost develops a fever, with the two singers acting as counterpoints to one and other.

The sultriness of "Fever" was complimented by music critics, as well the blend of Lipa and Angèle's vocals. The song topped both the Ultratop Flanders and Wallonia charts of Belgium, while also reaching the summit of France's SNEP singles chart. It tied "Hello" by Adele as the longest running number one single in the Wallonia region of Belgium. It further reached the top 10 of charts in Hungary, Romania and Switzerland as well as peaking at number 79 on the UK Singles Chart and number 69 on the Billboard Global 200 chart. The song was awarded a triple platinum certification from the Belgian Entertainment Association (BEA) and a diamond certification from the Syndicat National de l'Édition Phonographique (SNEP) in Belgium and France, respectively.

The music video for "Fever" was directed by We are from L.A. and filmed in London. It was built around a concept that women need to avoid danger in the streets by being home at a certain time, but have safety when around other women. The video features Lipa and Angèle spending the night exploring the streets of the city following a night out at a club. Several critics commended the visual for being an escape for viewers from the COVID-19 pandemic. Lipa and Angèle promoted the song with performances at the former's Studio 2054 livestream concert and at the 2020 NRJ Music Awards. Remixes by Oklou, Feder, Myd and Vantage were released for further promotion.

== Background and development ==
"Fever" was written by Dua Lipa, Angèle, Caroline Ailin, Ian Kirkpatrick, Jacob Kasher Hindlin and Julia Michaels, while the production was handled solely by Kirkpatrick. Lipa originally intended to place a solo version of the song on Future Nostalgia, but thought that its "lithe" tropical beat did not fit the album's sound. She decided to save the song for a later release. Following Future Nostalgia's March 2020 release, Lipa decided to contact Angèle's manager via email to send "Fever" to her and arrange a collaboration. Angèle was surprised when Lipa contacted her as she was a big fan of her work; she decided to respond saying that she was up to do the collaboration. Lipa discovered Angèle after her manager showed her the singer's music video for "Balance ton quoi" (2019), which she adored, while Angèle discovered Lipa through the internet and her single "New Rules" (2017). The two also had used the same choreographer.

The singers had been friends on social media prior to the collaboration and often sent one and other dog videos. Due to the COVID-19 pandemic, Lipa and Angèle were unable to meet in person, but worked from a distance while Lipa was in the United States and Angèle was between Belgium and Paris. They communicated through SMS to talk about ideas for the song and Angèle also proposed changes, including incorporating a keyboard. Angèle worked with Tristan Salvati and added French lyrics, and even got Lipa to sing in the language. The artists both described "Fever" as a blend of their styles. The song marks Angèle's first participation in an international song. "Fever" was recorded at Zenseven Studios in Los Angeles and Studio La Vague in Paris with the vocals being recorded at TaP Studio in London. Josh Gudwin mixed the song at Henson Studios in Hollywood while Chris Gehringer mastered it at Sterling Sound in Edgewater, New Jersey.

== Music and lyrics ==
"Fever"
An audio sample of the bridge of "Fever", a dance-pop, deep house and nu-disco track set to a synth-pop beat. The production uses digital melodies and airy instrumentals, while the lyrics are about one almost getting a fever due to infatuation.

Musically, "Fever" is a "sultry" dance-pop, deep house and nu-disco song with elements of 2000s Eurodance. The song is composed in 4/4 time and the key of F♯ minor with a tempo of 115 beats per minute. It has a structure of verse, chorus, verse, chorus, bridge, chorus, middle eight, bridge. The verses follow a F♯m–E–Bm chord progression, while an additional D chord is added to the sequence everywhere else. The song features a "slinky" disco-pop production, that includes Afrobeat-tinged synth-pop beats, digital melodies and dynamic percussion that contains hand claps and a snap sound. The song opens with tropical synths, while it as a whole features airy instrumentation and off-kilter melodies.

Lipa and Angèle both sing in English and French, with their vocals ranging from F♯_{3} to C♯_{5}. Lipa begins the song using confident vocals before stretching her voice to perform a "dramatic" falsetto in the chorus. Following a drop in a tropical house beat, Angèle "whisper-sings" the second verse using a "breathy" vocal style and singing in French. Angèle sings in iambic pentameter as the rhythm speeds up and the two sing together after the second verse. Lyrically, "Fever" deals with febrile and inevitably doomed lust themes, with the singers using the metaphor of sickness as a crush. They sing about the excitement of being with someone where they almost give one a fever due to the infatuation, being hot and flustered, as well as what comes with the feeling. Lipa and Angèle act as counterpoints to one and other, where Lipa is "strong, seductive, and playful" using bold vocals, while Angèle is "softer, pleading, almost despondent", using "airy, sensitive" vocals.

== Release and promotion ==
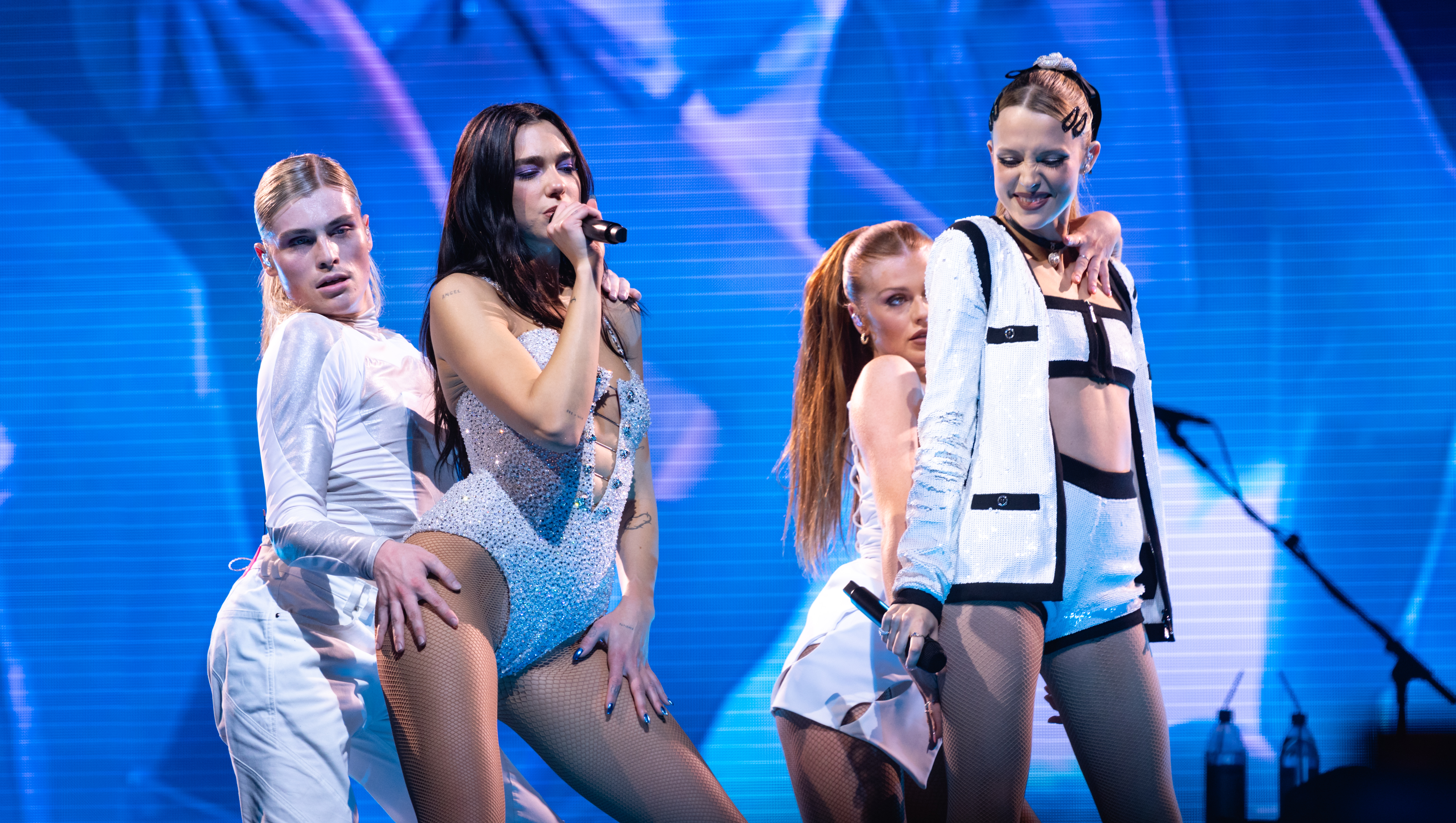
Lipa and Angèle performing "Fever" at the Future Nostalgia Tour show in London in May 2022

Rumours of a collaboration between Lipa and Angèle began in October 2020 after the two were spotted filming its music video in London. They began teasing the release of their collaboration via social media on 23 October 2020, exchanging the thermometer emoji back and forth. On 26 October 2020, Lipa formally announced that the collaboration would be titled "Fever" and that it was scheduled for a release four days later. The song was released for digital download and streaming on 29 October 2020 as a single. Simultaneously, it was added to the digital edition of Future Nostalgia. The following day, a lyric video was released. The song was included on the physical French edition of Future Nostalgia, released 20 November 2020.

Lipa and Angèle performed "Fever" for the first time at the former's 27 November 2020 livestream concert Studio 2054 as the 12th track. In the performance, the two danced around a pink and gold boudoir while wearing matching Versace outfits. On 5 December 2020, the singers performed the song at the 2020 NRJ Music Awards. A remix of the song by Oklou was released on 18 December 2020. Remixes by Feder, Myd and Vantage followed on 8 January 2021. The song was also included as the twelfth track on the album's 2021 reissue, Future Nostalgia: The Moonlight Edition, released 11 February. Angèle performed a solo rendition of "Fever" for RFM in September 2021. It was included on the setlist of Lipa's 2022 Future Nostalgia Tour. Angèle joined Lipa on the tour to perform the song for numerous tour dates. It was also included on the setlist of Angèle's 2022 Nonante-Cinq Tour.

== Critical reception ==
"Fever" received favorable reviews from music critics. In Rolling Stone, Brittany Spanos and Althea Legaspi complimented the song's sultriness and how Lipa and Angèle's vocal intertwine with one another. They additionally noted how their vocals complement the song's "steamy sentiment" and "seductive" beat. Chris Murphy of Vulture also commended the song's sultriness. Writing for the Evening Standard, Jochan Embley noted Lipa's departure from the disco-pop of Future Nostalgia, calling the song a "tantalising taste" of Lipa's future work. Mike Wass of Idolator viewed "Fever" as a "bilingual bop" and commended the "catchy" chorus and "elegant" middle eight. The staff of Wonderland noted Lipa's Kylie Minogue, Elvis Presley and Peggy Lee influences, seeing the song as a "slow burner" that is "all things sultry, hot and utterly atmospheric at the same time". In his review of Angèle's second studio album Nonante-Cinq (2021), Edward Pomykaj of Pitchfork named the song an "anxiety-ridden love song" that is driven home by the two singer's "brief but necessary" counterpoint to one and other while also mentioning that "it encapsulated the emotional breadth possible within nu-disco".

For Jenesaispop, Jordi Bardají compared "Fever" to "Look at Her Now" (2019) by Selena Gomez, another song produced by Kirkpatrick. In Billboard, Jason Lipshutz thought the song "happily prolongs" Future Nostalgia's "great era" and stated it "slows down the thump" of the album and simmers "instead of boiling over". He additionally complimented Lipa's vocals for encapsulating her "yearning" particularly on the hook, also calling Angèle's appearance a "satisfying assist". Stereogum's staff viewed "Fever" as "conventional" and praised the beat, which they called "fleet" and "efficient", as well as stating it "bubbles and twinkles". The staff additionally praised Lipa's pronunciation of "usually" saying it gives the song "shape and dimension" and sounds like a "bird call" sound effect. Têtu's staff thought that "Fever" will help everyone pass the time while in the COVID-19 pandemic lockdowns. Frenchly's Catherine Rickman commended the song for being "upbeat, sexy, and undeniably catchy".

Isabella Vega of Euphoria Magazine labelled "Fever" a "smoky, melodic, low-key symphony of intoxicating lust" and noted its blend of Lipa's "new wave of nostalgia pop" and Angèle's "sophistication, flirtiness, and je ne sais quoi" vocals. The staff of The Face labelled the song a "smooth dance pop tune", while Nina Corcoran of Consequence called it a "quick but infectio[us] pop song", and Derrick Rossignol for Uproxx labelled the song a "infectious and thumping pop tune". iHeartRadio's Eliot Hill named "Fever" one of 2020's most underrated songs. Atwood Magazine placed the song on its list of the year's best songs, with Nicole Almeida of the magazine complimenting the blend of Lipa's "undeniable swagger" and Angèle's "innocent poise" vocals and how "genuine" it is. She concluded by naming the song an "achievement" for putting forward the best of the two singers without "dimming" their personalities. Popjustice ranked the song at number 25 on their year-end, best songs of 2020 list. "Fever" won Hit of the Year for 2021 at the 2022 Music Industry Awards in Belgium.

== Commercial performance ==
In its first tracking week, "Fever" received 14,400,000 streams and 9,000 digital downloads worldwide. This resulted in a debut at number 84 on the Billboard Global 200 chart dated 14 November 2020. The following week, the song reached a peak of number 69, and departed the chart two weeks later. It reached number seven on the Euro Digital Song Sales chart. In November 2020, "Fever" spent two weeks on the UK Singles Chart and Canadian Hot 100, peaking at number 79 on both charts. It additionally reached number 3 in Hungary, 4 in Romania and 9 in Switzerland. In France, "Fever" debuted at number two. In its sixth week, the song rose to the chart's summit, becoming Angèle's second number one single in the country following "Tout oublier" in 2018 and Lipa's first. It spent six non-consecutive weeks in the position. The song is also the longest-running song for both of the artists, spending 104 weeks before being surpassed by Lipa's "Cold Heart (Pnau Remix)" the same year, who spent 140 weeks in French Singles Chart. The Syndicat National de l'Édition Phonographique (SNEP) awarded the song a diamond certification for 333,333 track-equivalent sales in France.

In the Flanders region of Belgium, "Fever" debuted at number three on the Ultratop chart dated 6 November 2020. The following week, it rose to the chart's summit, becoming Angèle's first number one single in Flanders and Lipa's fourth following "Be the One" in 2016, "New Rules" in 2017 and "One Kiss" in 2018. The song spent a total of eight non-consecutive weeks in the position. In the Wallonia region of the country, the song became Angèle's third number one single following "Tout oublier" and "Balance ton quoi" in 2019, and Lipa's second following "One Kiss" as it debuted at the chart's summit. The song spent 18 non-consecutive weeks in the position, tying Adele's 2015 single "Hello" for longest running number one single in the region. In May 2021, the song was awarded a triple platinum certification from the Belgian Entertainment Association (BEA) for selling 120,000 track-equivalent units in Belgium. "Fever" was the eighth most streamed song worldwide on Deezer in 2021.

== Music video ==
=== Background ===
The music video for "Fever" was directed by We are from L.A. and filmed in London during October 2020. The video was shot over the course of three days, all night shoots, and filming the video was first time Lipa and Angèle met in person. Its concept is built on the stereotype of how women have to be home at a certain time to avoid the dangers of the street, but having a safety element when surrounded by other women. The visual has an all women cast. On 15 October 2020, British tabloid The Sun reported that Lipa had "flout[ed]" national rules associated with the COVID-19 pandemic, claiming that the set was interrupted by the police after noise complaints. Lipa later denounced this by threatening to take legal action against the tabloid, who she did not mention by name. The Sun later issued an official apology to Lipa for any distress they caused her. They confirmed that no COVID-19 rules were broken and that the police were called due to an unrelated noise complaint. The music video premiered via YouTube on 6 November 2020. It was prefaced by a live chat with both Lipa and Angèle on the platform.

=== Synopsis ===
The video opens with a point-of-view shot of Lipa running out of a club, followed by Angèle, from the perspective of a taxi's backseat. Lipa wears a red leather jacket with blue jeans and black boots, while Angèle sports a red and black plaid jacket with a matching tank and black pants. Lipa calls out "taxi" before running up to the cab and requesting to be taken to Camden. The driver accepts and Lipa hops in the backseat, but Angèle asks Lipa to walk around with her instead of going home. Lipa is suspecting at first but eventually agrees to and apologizes to the taxi driver. The two begin walking and dancing around the rain-soaked London streets. Lipa then calls out Angèle's name and the two go into a takeaway restaurant, where they order chips and eat them with ketchup. The other people in the restaurant dance as Lipa and Angèle sing towards the camera. The two head back onto the streets, with Lipa hanging from a street pole at one point. They are passed by a police car which features another point-of-view shot from its backseat. As Lipa attempts to make a call, both Angèle and the cop give one and other dirty looks and the police cars' blue lights flash on Lipa and Angèle. They are then seen running beside graffitied walls.

In the next scene, Lipa and Angèle are at a train station waiting for a train. Angèle asks Lipa how her dog Dexter is, to which she responds that he had to stay in America due to the fact that her boyfriend Anwar Hadid had to work and that he needed to be neutered. Lipa then asks Angèle how to say "neutered" in French and Angèle responds with the word "castré". As this is happening, the song is playing over the speakers. The singers then dance on the deserted platform, with clips of them on the camera system. Lipa and Angèle make their way to a quiet neighborhood where an old woman gives them a dirty look. As the two progress through the neighborhood, they are invited by two girls to a party in the apartment of some unknown people. While on their way there, Lipa, Angèle and the two girls sing the latter's French lyrics of the song live in a hallway, before a woman comes out of her apartment and yells at them for not being residents of the building they are in and being too loud. The fellow party-goers sit in the room looking at a computer, smoking and drinking as Lipa and Angèle dance in the middle of the room. When the party is over the two leave the apartment in a dazed trance with their arms around one and other. The video closes with the singers entering a fish market singing Angèle's French lyrics live.

=== Reception ===
Writing for Vogue, Manon Garrigues viewed the "Fever" music video as "lively and cheerful", while also assuring that it will "warm the hearts" of fans during the COVID-19 pandemic. The staff of L'Officiel praised the visual for being "four minutes of freedom to escape" and thought it represents what everyone wants to do while stuck in the pandemic lockdowns. In his review for Billboard, Gil Kaufman wrote that the video reminded him of "the good ol' days" where people could go to bars, walk the streets and figure out their messy lives until morning. Rolling Stone's Angie Martoccio noted that the visual features Lipa and Angèle "immersing themselves in London nightlife", while Rhian Daly of NME saw the plot as a "journey" between the two artists, and The Fader's Sajae Elder said they variate between each "after-hours stop" and named the apartment party a "lively house jam". The "Fever" music video was nominated for Best Color Grading in a Video at the 2021 UK Music Video Awards.

== Track listings ==
- Digital download and streaming
1. "Fever" – 2:36
- Digital download and streaming – Oklou remix
1. "Fever" (Oklou remix) – 3:00
- Digital download and streaming – Feder remix
1. "Fever" (Feder remix) – 3:03
- Digital download and streaming – Myd remix
1. "Fever" (Myd remix) – 3:43
- Digital download and streaming – Vantage remix
1. "Fever" (Vantage remix) – 2:34

== Personnel ==
- Dua Lipa – vocals
- Angèle – vocals
- Ian Kirkpatrick – production, engineering, programming
- Tristan Salvati – additional production, vocal production, additional programming, engineering, keyboards, percussion
- Josh Gudwin – mixing
- Heidi Wang – assistant mixing
- Chris Gehringer – mastering
- Will Quinnell – assistant mastering

== Charts ==
=== Weekly charts ===
Weekly chart performance for "Fever"
| Chart (2020–2021) | Peak position |
|---|---|
| Belgium (Ultratop 50 Flanders) | 1 |
| Belgium (Ultratop 50 Wallonia) | 1 |
| Canada (Canadian Hot 100) | 79 |
| CIS Airplay (TopHit) | 59 |
| Colombia (National-Report) | 91 |
| Croatia (HRT) | 20 |
| Euro Digital Song Sales (Billboard) | 7 |
| France (SNEP) | 1 |
| Germany (GfK) | 85 |
| Global 200 (Billboard) | 69 |
| Greece (IFPI) | 38 |
| Hungary (Single Top 40) | 3 |
| Ireland (IRMA) | 36 |
| Lithuania (AGATA) | 39 |
| Netherlands (Dutch Tipparade 40) | 12 |
| Netherlands (Single Tip) | 8 |
| New Zealand Hot Singles (RMNZ) | 11 |
| Portugal (AFP) | 104 |
| Romania (Airplay 100) | 4 |
| Russia Airplay (TopHit) | 75 |
| Scottish Singles Sales (Official Charts) | 64 |
| Slovakia Airplay (ČNS IFPI) | 44 |
| Sweden Heatseeker (Sverigetopplistan) | 18 |
| Switzerland (Schweizer Hitparade) | 9 |
| Switzerland (Media Control Romandy) | 3 |
| UK Singles (Official Charts) | 79 |
| US Digital Song Sales (Billboard) | 31 |

=== Year-end charts ===
2020 year-end chart performance for "Fever"
| Chart (2020) | Position |
|---|---|
| France (SNEP) | 86 |

2021 year-end chart performance for "Fever"
| Chart (2021) | Position |
|---|---|
| Belgium (Ultratop Flanders) | 19 |
| Belgium (Ultratop Wallonia) | 2 |
| France (SNEP) | 8 |

2022 year-end chart performance for "Fever"
| Chart (2022) | Position |
|---|---|
| France (SNEP) | 112 |

== Certifications ==
Certifications and sales for "Fever"
| Region | Certification | Certified units/sales |
|---|---|---|
| Belgium (BRMA) | 3× Platinum | 120,000^{‡} |
| Canada (Music Canada) | Platinum | 80,000^{‡} |
| France (SNEP) | Diamond | 333,333^{‡} |
| New Zealand (RMNZ) | Gold | 15,000^{‡} |
| Norway (IFPI Norway) | Gold | 30,000^{‡} |
| Poland (ZPAV) | Platinum | 50,000^{‡} |
| Portugal (AFP) | Gold | 5,000^{‡} |
| Spain (Promusicae) | Gold | 30,000^{‡} |
| United Kingdom (BPI) | Silver | 200,000^{‡} |
^{‡} Sales+streaming figures based on certification alone.

== Release history ==
Release dates and formats for "Fever"
| Region | Date | Format(s) | Version | Label | Ref. |
|---|---|---|---|---|---|
| Various | 29 October 2020 | Digital download; streaming | Original | Warner | |
| Various | 18 December 2020 | Digital download; streaming | Oklou remix | Warner | |
| Various | 8 January 2021 | Digital download; streaming | Feder remix | Warner | |
| Various | 8 January 2021 | Digital download; streaming | Myd remix | Warner | |
| Various | 8 January 2021 | Digital download; streaming | Vantage remix | Warner | |

== See also ==
- List of number-one hits of 2020 (France)
- List of number-one hits of 2021 (France)
- List of top 10 singles in 2020 (France)
- List of Ultratop 50 number-one singles of 2020
- List of Ultratop 50 number-one singles of 2021
