= Swing (rapper) =

- Born: Siméon Zuyten; Example: May 20, 1991 (age 35); Brussels, Belgium
- Origin: Soignies, Hainaut, Wallonia, Belgium
- Genres: Belgian hip hop; R&B
- Occupation: Rapper
- Years active: 2010–present
- Label: LaBrique
- Website: https://www.swingsimeon.com/fr-fr/

Siméon Zuyten (born 20 April 1991), better known by the stage name Swing, is a Belgian rapper. He is a former member of the Belgian rap group "L'Or du commun".

== Biography ==
Of Belgian-Rwandan origin and with a degree in biomedical science, he began rapping in 2010 with his cousin Félé Flingue

=== Group : L'Or du commun (2013–2021) ===
In 2012, he met Robin Conrad (Loxley) and Victor Pailhès (Primero), with whom he formed the group "L'Or du commun".

In 2013, the band released their first EP, L'Origine.

In 2021, they released their latest album, Avant la nuit, to critical and popular acclaim.

During this period he was Romeo Elvis' backeur.

=== Solo career ===
==== EP : Marabout (2018) ====
In 2018, he unveiled his first solo project, his 10-track album "Marabout". A project with sung and melancholic tracks with which he managed to gain notoriety, notably thanks to his two tracks "Rivage" and "Corbeaux", both in collaboration with Le Motel.

==== EP : ALT F4 (2020) ====
In 2020, he released his 7-track EP "ALT F4". Other artists featured on the project include Nemir, Angèle, Dune and Crayon. In an interview with the media outlet La Libre, he explains that "... everything was spontaneous, I'd arrive at the studio without a text, we'd work on the prods the same day, I'd write the same day..."

His song "S'en Aller" with Angèle met with some success.

==== Album : Au revoir Siméon (2023) ====
In 2023, he released his first album, "Au revoir Siméon", a 15-track album whose title was inspired by his first heartbreak, an 8-year relationship. This project, completed in one and a half years, includes a collaboration with Prince Waly and YG Pablo.

== Discografie ==
=== Album ===
- 2023 : Au revoir Siméon

=== EPs ===
- 2018 : Marabout
- 2020 : ALT F4

=== Singles ===
Year	Album	Peak positions		Certification
Year	Album	BEL (Wa)	FR	Certification
2017	Cercle (Roméo Elvis x Le Motel)	—	—	
2018	Corbeaux (feat. Le Motel)	—	—	
2018	Canopée	—	—	
2019	N	—	—	
2020	Gris	Tip	—	
2020	S'en aller	46	156	
2023	Maladresse	—	—	
2023	Reykjavic (feat. YG Pablo)	—	—	
2023	Un seul Ciel (feat. Prince Waly)	—	—	
2024	Mérite	—	—	
