= Arkéa Arena =

Indoor arena in Floirac, France

- Bordeaux Arena, Grand Arena Bordeaux

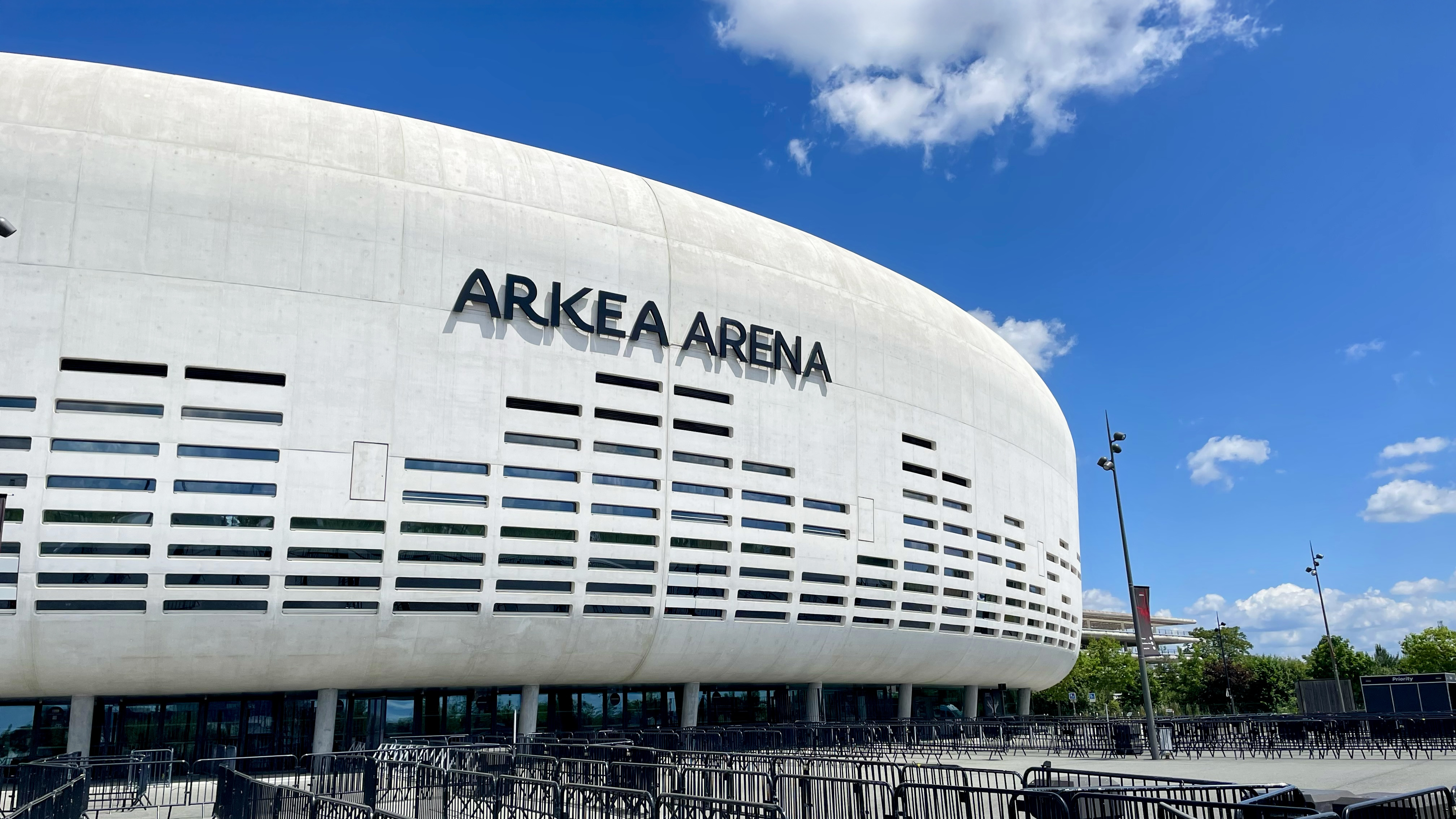
- Interactive map of Arkéa Arena
- Former names: Bordeaux Métropole Arena
- Location: Floirac, Nouvelle-Aquitaine, France
- Coordinates: 44°49′30″N 0°31′52″W
- Owner: Bordeaux Métropole
- Operator: Lagardère Live Entertainment
- Capacity: 11,300 (with standing); 8,000 (seated)

Construction
- Groundbreaking: 11 April 2016
- Opened: 24 January 2018
- Architect: Rudy Ricciotti
- Main contractor: Bouygues

Arkéa Arena (French pronunciation: [aʁkea]; previously known as the Bordeaux Métropole Arena) is a multi-purpose indoor arena in Floirac, near Bordeaux in France. Opened in January 2018, it offers a capacity for all types of shows and events from 2,500 to 11,300. The arena is mainly used for concerts and sporting events.

== Construction ==
Lagardère Live Entertainment (agent and operator), Bouygues Bâtiment Centre Sud-Ouest (a subsidiary of Bouygues Construction), and architect Rudy Ricciotti won the tender on 20 December 2013. The building permit was granted in July 2015, work started in early 2016, and the first stone was laid on 11 April 2016. The construction ends in January 2018. It was designed by the architect to look like a pebble, deposited on the shore by the Garonne river that flows alongside.

The project meets the need to create a concert hall in the Bordeaux Métropole capable of hosting tours of international artists, which the Patinoire de Mériadeck ice rink does not allow.

== History ==
The official inauguration took place on 24 January 2018 with a concert by Depeche Mode during their Global Spirit Tour, with 11,000 tickets sold out in minutes. On 3 October 2018, Crédit Mutuel Arkéa obtained the naming rights of the venue, which officially becomes "Arkéa Arena". This sponsorship is confirmed for a period of 10 years.

== Events ==
=== Concerts ===
Concerts at Arkéa Arena
Date	Artist	Tour	Attendance
24 January 2018	Depeche Mode	Global Spirit Tour	10,602
17 February 2018	Soy Luna cast	Soy Luna Live	—
4 April 2018	Imagine Dragons	Evolve World Tour	10,952
24 June 2018	Shakira	El Dorado World Tour	—
6 May 2019	Mark Knopfler	Down The Road Wherever Tour	—
11 June 2019	Mariah Carey	Caution World Tour	—
22 October 2019	Sting	My Songs Tour	—
4 May 2022	Angèle	Nonante-Cinq Tour	—
5 July 2022	Alicia Keys	Alicia + Keys World Tour	—
7 October 2022	Angèle	Nonante-Cinq Tour	—
3 November 2022	Sting	My Songs Tour	—
15 June 2023	Peter Gabriel	I/O The Tour	—
5 December 2023	Björk	Cornucopia	—
26 March 2024	James Blunt	Who We Used to Be Tour	—
13 December 2026	Various artists	K-Pop Forever!	—

== Transport ==
The TBM network serves the arena and is accessible from the ring road via the interchanges. On event days, a shuttle bus operates from Porte de Bourgogne station connecting the arena to the Bordeaux tramway network. The service starts 2 hours before a show begins and terminates approximately one hour after a performance finishes.

A paid parking of 962 places is annexed to the venue and is operated by the company Parcub (parking control of the métropole).

A VCUB bike station is located nearby with 20 docking points. 500 bicycle spaces are also available.

== See also ==
- List of indoor arenas in France
