= Brol =

Brol may refer to:

- Bröl, a river in Germany
- Brol (album), an album by Belgian singer Angèle
- Jean Pierre Brol (born 1982), Guatemalan sport-shooter
