= Instinct (Angèle album) =

2026 studio album by Angèle

Studio album by Angèle
- Released: 16 October 2026
- Genre: Pop
- Length: 43:53
- Languages: French; English
- Labels: Angèle VL; Sony
- Producers: Angèle; Justice; Oscar Holter; Oscar Scheller; Sebastian; Soulwax; Tristan Salvati

Angèle chronology
Nonante-Cinq (2021)	Instinct (2026)

Singles from Instinct
- 1. "What You Want" Released: 27 February 2026; 2. "Dis-le" Released: 19 June 2026; 3. "Une seule vie" Released: 28 August 2026; 4. "Love Triangle" Released: 29 September 2026

Professional ratings
Review scores
Source	Rating
Financial Times	4/5 stars
The Guardian	3/5 stars
Télérama	TT

Instinct is the third studio album by the Belgian singer Angèle. It was released on 16 October 2026 through Angèle's own label Angèle VL Records and Sony Music.

== Track listing ==
All lyrics are written by Angèle, except where noted.

Instinct track listing
No.	Title	Lyrics	Music	Producer(s)	Length
1.	"Instinct (Intro)"		Angèle; Tristan Salvati	Angèle; Salvati	0:48
2.	"Dis-le"		Angèle; Salvati	Angèle; Salvati	4:07
3.	"Au revoir"	Angèle; Elvira Anderfjärd; Oscar Holter; Luka Kloser; Salvati	Angèle; Anderfjärd; Holter; Kloser; Salvati	Holter; Angèle^{[c]}; Salvati^{[c]}; Anderfjärd^{[a]}; Kloser^{[a]}	3:26
4.	"Une seule vie"		Angèle; Salvati	Angèle; Salvati	4:06
5.	"Trop" (featuring Soulwax)		Angèle	Soulwax; Salvati^{[v]}	3:11
6.	"On verra"		Angèle	Angèle; Salvati	4:34
7.	"What You Want" (featuring Justice)		Angèle; Gaspard Augé; Xavier de Rosnay	Justice^{[p]}; Salvati^{[v]}	3:08
8.	"Je compte"		Angèle	Angèle; Salvati	3:14
9.	"F4ck 4ever"		Angèle; Salvati; Oscar Scheller	Angèle; Salvati; Scheller	3:17
10.	"Tout décider"		Angèle; Salvati	Angèle; Salvati	2:20
11.	"Je sais"	Angèle; Serge Van Laeken	Angèle; Salvati; Van Laeken	Angèle; Salvati	3:42
12.	"Love Triangle" (featuring Caroline Polachek and Sebastian)	Angèle; Caroline Polachek	Angèle; Salvati; Sebastian	Sebastian; Angèle^{[c]}; Salvati^{[c]}	3:44
13.	"NYC Blues"		Angèle	Angèle	4:16
Total length:					43:53

=== Notes ===
- ^{^[p]} indicates a producer and vocal producer
- ^{^[c]} indicates a co-producer
- ^{^[a]} indicates an additional producer
- ^{^[v]} indicates a vocal producer

== Personnel ==
Credits are adapted from Tidal.

- Angèle – piano (tracks 1, 2, 6, 8, 13), programming (1, 3–6, 8, 9, 11, 13), keyboards (2–6, 8–13), engineering (3, 13), arrangement (6, 8, 13), mixing (13)
- Tristan Salvati – engineering (all tracks), programming (1–4, 6, 8–11), mixing (1, 6, 8, 11), drums (2, 8, 13), keyboards (2–4, 6, 9–11), arrangement (6, 8), bass (6, 8)
- Randy Merrill – mastering
- Geoff Swan – mixing (2, 7)
- Bryce Bordone – engineering (3, 4, 12)
- Serban Ghenea – mixing (3, 4, 12)
- Oscar Holter – bass, drums, keyboards, programming, engineering (3)
- Elvira Anderfjärd – keyboards, programming, engineering (3)
- Luka Kloser – keyboards, programming, engineering (3)
- David Dewaele – arrangement, keyboards, programming, engineering, mixing (5)
- Stephen Dewaele – arrangement, keyboards, programming, engineering, mixing (5)
- Xavier de Rosnay – bass, keyboards, programming, engineering (7)
- Gaspard Augé – drums, keyboards, programming, engineering (7)
- Chab – mastering (7)
- Clint Gibbs – mixing (9, 10)
- Oscar Scheller – keyboards, programming (9)
- Sebastian – keyboards, programming, engineering (12)
- Laura Sisk – engineering (12)

== Charts ==
Chart performance for Instinct
Chart (2026)	Peak position
Belgian Albums (Ultratop Flanders)	2
Belgian Albums (Ultratop Wallonia)	1
French Albums (SNEP)	1
Swiss Albums (Schweizer Hitparade)	2
