= Down the Road Wherever Tour =

2019 concert tour by Mark Knopfler

- World tour by Mark Knopfler
- Location: Europe, North America
- Associated album: Down the Road Wherever
- Start date: 25 April 2019
- End date: 25 September 2019
- Legs: 2
- No. of shows: 86
- Attendance: 552,447
- Box office: $44,054,524

Mark Knopfler concert chronology
- Tracker Tour (2015); Down The Road Wherever Tour (2019)

Down the Road Wherever Tour was a 2019 concert tour by British singer-songwriter and guitarist Mark Knopfler, promoting the release of his album Down the Road Wherever. The tour started on 25 April 2019 in Barcelona, Spain, included 86 concerts in two legs, and ended on 25 September 2019 in New York City, New York in the United States. Paul Sexton from UDiscoverMusic described the London show as having, "...little to do with overt showmanship and everything to do with exhilarating interaction with his bandmates."

== Setlist ==
This set list is representative of the tour's average setlist as conducted by Setlist.fm, which represents all concerts for the duration of the tour.

1. Why Aye Man
2. Corned Beef City
3. Sailing to Philadelphia
4. Once Upon a Time in the West (Dire Straits song)
5. Romeo and Juliet (Dire Straits song)
6. My Bacon Roll
7. Matchstick Man
8. Done with Bonaparte
9. Heart Full of Holes
10. Your Latest Trick (Dire Straits song)
11. Postcards from Paraguay
12. On Every Street (Dire Straits song)
13. Speedway at Nazareth

Encore:

1. Money for Nothing (Dire Straits song)

Encore 2:

1. Going Home: Theme of the Local Hero

== Tour dates ==
| Date | City | Country | Venue |
|---|---|---|---|
Europe
| 25 April 2019 | Barcelona | Spain | Palau Sant Jordi |
| 26 April 2019 | Valencia | Spain | Plaza de Toros de Valencia |
| 28 April 2019 | Madrid | Spain | WiZink Center |
| 29 April 2019 | Córdoba | Spain | Plaza de Toros de los Califas |
| 30 April 2019 | Lisbon | Portugal | Altice Arena |
| 3 May 2019 | Coruna | Spain | Coliseum da Coruna |
| 5 May 2019 | Pamplona | Spain | Navarra Arena |
| 6 May 2019 | Bordeaux | France | Arkéa Arena |
| 7 May 2019 | Toulouse | France | Zenith Metropole |
| 9 May 2019 | Zürich | Switzerland | Hallenstadion |
| 10 May 2019 | Milan | Italy | Mediolanum Forum |
| 12 May 2019 | Strasbourg | France | Zenith Europe |
| 13 May 2019 | Cologne | Germany | Lanxess Arena |
| 15 May 2019 | Berlin | Germany | Mercedes Benz Arena |
| 16 May 2019 | Hanover | Germany | TUI Arena |
| 18 May 2019 | Leeds | England | First Direct Arena |
| 19 May 2019 | Newcastle | England | Metro Radio Arena |
| 21 May 2019 | London | England | Royal Albert Hall |
| 22 May 2019 | London | England | Royal Albert Hall |
| 24 May 2019 | Dublin | Ireland | 3Arena |
| 26 May 2019 | Glasgow | Scotland | SSE Hydro |
| 28 May 2019 | London | England | The O2 Arena |
| 29 May 2019 | Manchester | England | Manchester Arena |
| 30 May 2019 | Birmingham | England | Genting Arena |
| 7 June 2019 | Ålesund | Norway | SBM Arena |
| 8 June 2019 | Bergen | Norway | Bergenhus Festning |
| 9 June 2019 | Oslo | Norway | Oslo Spektrum |
| 11 June 2019 | Stockholm | Sweden | Ericsson Globe |
| 12 June 2019 | Gothenburg | Sweden | Scandinavium |
| 13 June 2019 | Herning | Denmark | Jyske Bank Boxen |
| 15 June 2019 | Copenhagen | Denmark | Royal Arena |
| 17 June 2019 | Paris | France | AccorHotels Arena |
| 19 June 2019 | Lyon | France | Halle Tony Garnier |
| 20 June 2019 | Esch-sur-Alzette | Luxembourg | Rockhal |
| 22 June 2019 | Antwerp | Belgium | Sportpaleis |
| 23 June 2019 | Amsterdam | Netherlands | Ziggo Dome |
| 25 June 2019 | Hamburg | Germany | Barclaycard Arena |
| 26 June 2019 | Prague | Czech Republic | O2 Arena |
| 28 June 2019 | Vienna | Austria | Wiener Stadthalle |
| 29 June 2019 | Ljubljana | Slovenia | Arena Stozice |
| 1 July 2019 | Oberhausen | Germany | König-Pilsner Arena |
| 2 July 2019 | Stuttgart | Germany | Hanns-Martin-Schleyer-Halle |
| 3 July 2019 (Note: The 3 July 2019 show was part of St.Peter at Sunset Festival) | Kestenholz | Switzerland | Areal der Kapelle St. Pete |
| 5 July 2019 | Leipzig | Germany | Arena Leipzig |
| 6 July 2019 | Mannheim | Germany | SAP Arena |
| 7 July 2019 | Munich | Germany | Olympiahalle |
| 9 July 2019 | Budapest | Hungary | László Papp Budapest Sports Arena |
| 10 July 2019 | Kraków | Poland | Tauron Arena Kraków |
| 11 July 2019 | Gdańsk/Sopot | Poland | Ergo Arena |
| 13 July 2019 (Note: The 13 July 2019 show was part of Lucca Summer Festival) | Lucca | Italy | Piazza Napoleone |
| 14 July 2019 (Note: The 14 July 2019 show was part of Guitare en scène Festival) | Saint-Julien-en-Genevois | France | Stade des Burgondes Saint-Julien-en-Genevois |
| 15 July 2019 (Note: The 15 July 2019 show was part of Festival de Nimes) | Nimes | France | Arènes de Nîmes |
| 17 July 2019 (Note: The 17 July 2019 show was part of Stupingi Sonic Park Festival) | Nichelino | Italy | Palazzina di caccia |
| 18 July 2019 | Cattolica | Italy | Arena della Regina |
| 20 July 2019 | Rome | Italy | Terme di Carcalla |
| 21 July 2019 | Rome | Italy | Terme di Carcalla |
| 22 July 2019 (Note: The 22 July 2019 show was part of Verona Opera Festival 2019) | Verona | Italy | Arena Di Verona |
North America
| 16 August 2019 | Mashantucket | United States | Grand Theater at Foxwoods Resort Casino |
| 17 August 2019 | Philadelphia | United States | The Met |
| 18 August 2019 | Vienna | United States | Wolf Trap |
| 20 August 2019 | New York City | United States | Beacon Theatre |
| 21 August 2019 | New York City | United States | Beacon Theatre |
| 23 August 2019 | Boston | United States | Leader Bank Pavilion |
| 24 August 2019 | Montreal | Canada | Place des Arts |
| 25 August 2019 | Toronto | Canada | Sony Center |
| 27 August 2019 | Indianapolis | United States | Murat Theatre |
| 28 August 2019 | Kansas City | United States | Arvest Bank Theatre |
| 30 August 2019 | Minneapolis | United States | Orpheum Theatre |
| 31 August 2019 | Milwaukee | United States | Riverside Theater |
| 1 September 2019 | Chicago | United States | The Chicago Theater |
| 3 September 2019 | Nashville | United States | Ryman Auditorium |
| 4 September 2019 | Atlanta | United States | State Bank Amphitheatre |
| 6 September 2019 | Sugar Land | United States | Smart Financial Centre |
| 7 September 2019 | Austin | United States | Austin City Limits Live |
| 8 September 2019 | Grand Prairie | United States | Verizon Theatre |
| 10 September 2019 | Morrison | United States | Red Rocks Amphitheater |
| 11 September 2019 | Salt Lake City | United States | Red Butte Garden Amphitheatre |
| 13 September 2019 | Portland | United States | Keller Auditorium |
| 14 September 2019 | Woodinville | United States | Chateau Ste. Michelle Winery |
| 15 September 2019 | Woodinville | United States | Chateau Ste. Michelle Winery |
| 16 September 2019 | Vancouver | Canada | Orpheum Theatre |
| 18 September 2019 | Berkeley | United States | The Greek Theatre |
| 20 September 2019 | Santa Barbara | United States | Santa Barbara Bowl |
| 21 September 2019 | Phoenix | United States | Comerica Theatre |
| 22 September 2019 | Los Angeles | United States | Greek Theatre |
| 25 September 2019 | New York City | United States | Madison Square Garden |

== Recording ==
Every show from the tour was recorded and later released as .flac or .mp3 record at Mark's Website

== Personnel ==
- Mark Knopfler - guitar, vocals
- Richard Bennett - guitar
- Guy Fletcher - keyboard, guitar
- Jim Cox - keyboards
- Ian Thomas - drums
- Glenn Worf - bass
- Danny Cummings - percussion
- Nigel Hitchcock - tenor saxophone
- Tom Walsh - trumpet
- Trevor Mires - trombone
- John Mccusker - fiddle, violin
- Mike McGoldrick - whistle
- Robbie McIntosh - guitar
