= La Loi de Murphy =

2017 song by Angèle

Single by Angèle

from the album Brol
- Released: 23 October 2017
- Length: 3:15
- Label: Angèle VL
- Songwriter(s): Angèle Van Laeken; Veence Hanao; Matthew Irons
- Producer(s): Angèle; Tristan Salvati

Angèle singles chronology
"La Loi de Murphy" (2017)	"Je veux tes yeux" (2018)

"La Loi de Murphy" (French pronunciation: [la lwa də mœʁfi]) is the debut single by Belgian singer Angèle released on 23 October 2017. This song was later included on her debut album Brol.

== Background ==
"La Loi de Murphy" was written by Angèle with Belgian rapper Veence Hanao and Matthew Irons, the singer and guitarist of Belgian group Puggy. The title means "Murphy's law" in French.

== Music video ==
The music video for "La Loi de Murphy" was directed by Belgian photographer and filmmaker Charlotte Abramow. It was watched 460,000 times on YouTube three days after its release.

== Charts ==
=== Weekly charts ===
Chart (2017–2018)	Peak position
Belgium (Ultratop 50 Flanders)	22
Belgium (Ultratop 50 Wallonia)	5
France (SNEP)	42

=== Year-end charts ===
Chart (2018)	Position
Belgium (Ultratop Wallonia)	23

== Certifications ==
Region	Certification	Certified units/sales
Belgium (BRMA)	Platinum	40,000^{‡}
France (SNEP)	Platinum	200,000^{‡}
^{‡} Sales+streaming figures based on certification alone.
