= Brol (album) =

Studio album by Angèle
- Released: 5 October 2018
- Length: 64:45
- Language: French
- Label: Angèle VL
- Producers: Angèle; Tristan Salvati

Angèle chronology
Brol (2018)	Nonante-Cinq (2021)

Singles from Brol
- 1. "La Loi de Murphy" Released: 23 October 2017; 2. "Je veux tes yeux" Released: 31 January 2018; 3. "La Thune" Released: 19 June 2018; 4. "Jalousie" Released: 20 September 2018; 5. "Tout oublier" Released: 13 October 2018; 6. "Balance ton quoi" Released: 15 April 2019; 7. "Flou" Released: 8 September 2019; 8. "Ta reine" Released: 6 March 2020

Singles from Brol La Suite
- 1. "Perdus" Released: 10 October 2019; 2. "Oui ou non" Released: 8 November 2019

Brol (French pronunciation: [bʁɔl]) is the debut studio album by Belgian singer Angèle. It was self-released on 5 October 2018 through Angèle's own label Angèle VL Records. A reissue with seven new tracks was released on 8 November 2019 under the name Brol La Suite.

The album received the Album Révélation of the Year at the 2019 Victoires de la Musique awards ceremony in France.

== Artwork and title ==
The album cover features a photograph of Angèle as a child with her baby teeth out.

The album's title is a reference to the Belgian slang word "brol". In Brussels slang, "brol" has multiple meanings. It can refer to either a heap of random small objects, or a nondescript object of little value; a place of disorder or shambles; or a fuss.

== Promotion and tour ==
A music video for "Tout oublier" was released upon the album's release date on 5 October 2018. The video features Angèle and her brother Roméo unfittingly wearing ski attire and carrying ski equipment on the beach of a seaside resort. The Brol Tour consisted of more than 80 shows across France, Belgium, Switzerland and Canada. The tour included four sold-out concerts at the Accor Arena in Paris and three sold-out concerts at the ING Arena in Brussels.

== Critical reception ==
Professional ratings
Review scores
Source	Rating
Charts in France	3.5/5 stars
L'Echo	3/5
Le Journal du Dimanche	4/5 stars

Brol has received generally positive reviews from critics. Writing for Le Journal du Dimanche, Ludovic Perrin praised the album, calling each song excellent and perfectly arranged.

The album was included in Pretty Much Amazing's list of twenty-five "Albums of the Year" for 2018.

== Track listing ==
Credits adapted from liner notes.

All lyrics are written by Angèle Van Laeken, except where noted; all music is composed by Angèle Van Laeken, except where noted.

Brol – Standard edition
No.	Title	Lyrics	Music	Length
1.	"La Thune"			3:21
2.	"Balance ton quoi"			3:09
3.	"Jalousie"			3:45
4.	"Tout oublier" (featuring Roméo Elvis)	Angèle Van Laeken; Roméo Van Laeken	Angèle Van Laeken; Tristan Salvati	3:22
5.	"La Loi de Murphy"	Angèle Van Laeken; Matthew Irons; Veence Hanao	Angèle Van Laeken; Matthew Irons; Veence Hanao	3:15
6.	"Nombreux"			3:12
7.	"Victime des réseaux"		Angèle Van Laeken; Salvati	3:22
8.	"Les matins"			2:55
9.	"Je veux tes yeux"		Angèle Van Laeken; Hanao	3:25
10.	"Ta reine"			3:33
11.	"Flemme"		Angèle Van Laeken; Salvati	4:16
12.	"Flou"		Angèle Van Laeken; Salvati	3:16
Total length:				41:01

Brol La Suite – Reissue
No.	Title	Lyrics	Music	Length
1.	"La Thune"			3:21
2.	"Balance ton quoi"			3:09
3.	"Jalousie"			3:45
4.	"Tout oublier" (featuring Roméo Elvis)	Angèle Van Laeken; Roméo Van Laeken	Angèle Van Laeken; Tristan Salvati	3:22
5.	"La Loi de Murphy"	Angèle Van Laeken; Matthew Irons; Veence Hanao	Angèle Van Laeken; Matthew Irons; Veence Hanao	3:15
6.	"Nombreux"			3:12
7.	"Victime des réseaux"		Angèle Van Laeken; Salvati	3:22
8.	"Les matins"			2:55
9.	"Je veux tes yeux"		Angèle Van Laeken; Hanao	3:25
10.	"Ta reine"			3:33
11.	"Flemme"		Angèle Van Laeken; Salvati	4:16
12.	"Flou"		Angèle Van Laeken; Salvati	3:16
13.	"Perdus"			3:03
14.	"Oui ou Non"			3:16
15.	"Insomnies"		Angèle Van Laeken; Irons	3:32
16.	"Tu me regardes"		Angèle Van Laeken; Salvati	3:12
17.	"J'entends"			3:37
18.	"Que du Love" (featuring Kiddy Smile)			2:33
19.	"Ta reine" (Orchestral Version)			4:31
Total length:				64:45

== Personnel ==
Credits adapted from liner notes.

Musicians

- Angèle Van Laeken – vocals, keyboards
- Tristan Salvati – guitar (1–4, 6–12), bass (1–4, 6–12), keyboards
- Veence Hanao – keyboards (5, 9)
- Matthew Irons – keyboards (5)

Technical personnel

- Angèle – production, programming
- Tristan Salvati – mixing (6, 8, 11), production, programming, recording
- Veence Hanao – programming (5, 9)
- Hugo Martinez – mixing (1–4, 7, 10, 12)
- Nk.F – mixing (5, 9), mastering (9)
- Adrien Pallot – mastering (2–4, 6–8, 10–12)
- Alex Gopher – mastering (1)
- Matthew Irons – recording (5), programming (5)
- Charlotte Abramow – photography
- Serge Van Laeken – cover photo
- Boldatwork – design

== Charts ==
=== Weekly charts ===
Chart (2018–2020)	Peak position
Belgian Albums (Ultratop Flanders)	1
Belgian Albums (Ultratop Wallonia)	1
French Albums (SNEP)	1
Swiss Albums (Schweizer Hitparade)	7

=== Year-end charts ===
Chart (2018)	Position
Belgian Albums (Ultratop Flanders)	23
Belgian Albums (Ultratop Wallonia)	3
French Albums (SNEP)	18

Chart (2019)	Position
Belgian Albums (Ultratop Flanders)	4
Belgian Albums (Ultratop Wallonia)	1
French Albums (SNEP)	1
Swiss Albums (Schweizer Hitparade)	15

Chart (2020)	Position
Belgian Albums (Ultratop Flanders)	9
Belgian Albums (Ultratop Wallonia)	2
French Albums (SNEP)	4
Swiss Albums (Schweizer Hitparade)	49

Chart (2021)	Position
Belgian Albums (Ultratop Flanders)	22
Belgian Albums (Ultratop Wallonia)	10
French Albums (SNEP)	58

Chart (2022)	Position
Belgian Albums (Ultratop Flanders)	55
Belgian Albums (Ultratop Wallonia)	20

Chart (2023)	Position
Belgian Albums (Ultratop Flanders)	141
Belgian Albums (Ultratop Wallonia)	35

Chart (2024)	Position
Belgian Albums (Ultratop Wallonia)	48

== Certifications and sales ==
Region	Certification	Certified units/sales
Belgium (BRMA)	7× Platinum	140,000^{‡}
France (SNEP)	2× Diamond	1,000,000^{‡}
^{‡} Sales+streaming figures based on certification alone.

== See also ==
- List of best-selling albums in Belgium
- List of best-selling albums in France
