= Nonante-Cinq =

2021 studio album by Angèle

Studio album by Angèle
- Released: 3 December 2021
- Genres: Dance-pop; disco-pop; synth-pop
- Length: 43:18
- Language: French
- Labels: Angèle VL; Initial Artist
- Producers: Angèle Van Laeken; Tristan Salvati

Angèle chronology
Brol (2018)	Nonante-Cinq (2021)	Instinct (2026)

Singles from Nonante-Cinq
- 1. "Bruxelles je t'aime" Released: 21 October 2021; 2. "Démons" Released: 3 December 2021; 3. "Libre" Released: 29 April 2022

Singles from Nonante-Cinq La Suite
- 1. "Amour, Haine & Danger" Released: 29 September 2022; 2. "Le temps fera les choses" Released: 16 February 2023

Professional ratings
Review scores
Source	Rating
Pitchfork	6.7/10

Nonante-Cinq (French pronunciation: [nɔnɑ̃t sɛ̃k], transl. Ninety-five) is the second studio album by Belgian singer Angèle. It was released on her 26th birthday, 3 December 2021, through Angèle's own label Angèle VL Records and Initial Artist Services. The album was preceded by two singles: "Bruxelles je t'aime", and "Démons" featuring Damso.

The album reached number one in Wallonia, as well as the top five in Flanders and France. It moved 30,958 units in France in its debut week, 17,530 of which were physical sales.

A reissue of the album, subtitled La Suite, was released on 17 November 2022.

== Background and release ==
Talking about the development, she revealed that the sadness and melancholy caused by the break-up between her and Léo Walk, as well as the COVID-19 lockdowns, were "catalysts" of the writing process; although, she admitted, the sadness felt more intense during the creation of her debut studio album Brol.

After the release of the lead single "Bruxelles je t'aime" on 21 October 2021, Angèle announced the album on 27 October. She also revealed the album cover which depicts her riding a rollercoaster along with different versions of herself. The title refers to her birth year 1995. The album was originally scheduled to be released on 10 December but was spontaneously moved up one week because of Angèle's 26th birthday on 3 December. After having contracted COVID-19 a week prior to the release, she chose to host a virtual release party on her Instagram. Accompanied by a music video, the song "Démons" with Belgian rapper Damso was released as the second single the same day.

== Tour ==
The Nonante-Cinq Tour was announced in late October, 2021 to promote the album. Initially with 24 dates, the tour was expanded several times with additional arena shows and festival appearances. The ongoing tour is visiting 5 countries, including France, Spain, Switzerland, Canada, and Belgium.

== Track listing ==
All tracks are written by and produced by Angèle Van Laeken and Tristan Salvati, unless noted otherwise.

Nonante-Cinq – Standard edition
No.	Title	Writer(s)	Length
1.	"Bruxelles je t'aime"		3:48
2.	"Libre"		2:44
3.	"On s'habitue"		2:38
4.	"Solo"		3:40
5.	"Pensées positives"		3:31
6.	"Taxi"		4:18
7.	"Démons" (featuring Damso)	Angele Van Laeken; William Kalubi Mwamba; Tristan Salvati	4:11
8.	"Plus de sens"		3:29
9.	"Tempête"		3:40
10.	"Profite"		4:09
11.	"Mots justes"		3:10
12.	"Mauvais rêves"		3:55
Total length:			43:18

Nonante-Cinq La Suite – Reissue
No.	Title	Writer(s)	Length
13.	"Amour, Haine et Danger"		3:18
14.	"Promets-moi"		3:00
15.	"CP_009_Évidemment" (with Orelsan)	Angèle Van Laeken; Aurélien Cotentin; Tristan Salvati; Skread; Phazz	3:26
16.	"Patrick"		2:53
17.	"Le temps fera les choses"		2:58
18.	"Démons" (Live Orchestral) (featuring Damso)	Angele Van Laeken; William Kalubi Mwamba; Tristan Salvati	3:54
Total length:			62:47

Nonante-Cinq La Suite – Digital Reissue
No.	Title	Length
19.	"Le temps fera les choses" (Alternative Version)	2:57
Total length:		65:40

== Charts ==
=== Weekly charts ===
Weekly chart performance for Nonante-Cinq
Chart (2021–2022)	Peak position
Belgian Albums (Ultratop Flanders)	3
Belgian Albums (Ultratop Wallonia)	1
French Albums (SNEP)	2
Swiss Albums (Schweizer Hitparade)	6

=== Year-end charts ===
2021 year-end chart performance for Nonante-Cinq
Chart (2021)	Position
Belgian Albums (Ultratop Flanders)	65
Belgian Albums (Ultratop Wallonia)	5
French Albums (SNEP)	25

2022 year-end chart performance for Nonante-Cinq
Chart (2022)	Position
Belgian Albums (Ultratop Flanders)	14
Belgian Albums (Ultratop Wallonia)	3
French Albums (SNEP)	6
Swiss Albums (Schweizer Hitparade)	75

2023 year-end chart performance for Nonante-Cinq
Chart (2023)	Position
Belgian Albums (Ultratop Flanders)	168
Belgian Albums (Ultratop Wallonia)	37
French Albums (SNEP)	35

2024 year-end chart performance for Nonante-Cinq
Chart (2024)	Position
Belgian Albums (Ultratop Wallonia)	173
French Albums (SNEP)	130

2025 year-end chart performance for Nonante-Cinq
Chart (2025)	Position
Belgian Albums (Ultratop Wallonia)	192

== Certifications ==
Region	Certification	Certified units/sales
Belgium (BRMA)	2× Platinum	40,000^{‡}
France (SNEP)	3× Platinum	300,000^{‡}
^{‡} Sales+streaming figures based on certification alone.
