= Bruxelles je t'aime =

2021 single by Angèle

Single by Angèle

from the album Nonante-Cinq
- Language: French; Dutch
- Released: 10 October 2021
- Genre: Pop; synth-pop
- Length: 3:48
- Label: Angèle VL
- Songwriter: Angèle
- Producers: Tristan Salvati; Angèle

Angèle singles chronology
"Fever" (2020)	"Bruxelles je t'aime" (2021)	"Démons" (2021)

Music video
- "Bruxelles je t'aime on YouTube

"Bruxelles je t'aime" (pronounced [bʁysɛl ʒə tɛm], transl. Brussels, I love you) is a song performed by Belgian singer-songwriter Angèle. It was released on 10 October 2021 as the lead single from her second studio album Nonante-Cinq. Angèle wrote the song and produced it with Tristan Salvati. It reached number one in Wallonia.

== Background ==
In a press release, Angèle stated the meaning behind the song:

"Bruxelles je t'aime" was composed during the first [COVID-19] lockdown. I had already made the melody and started production, but it was only when I realized that I was forced to stay away from my city that I wrote this declaration of love. I like the idea of talk about my city as if it were a lover, just like in a relationship … we love each other, we break up … we miss each other, but we never forget each other.

== Content ==
In a press release, Angèle mentioned that while she lives in Paris most of the time, she is still "attached to her hometown where all her family and childhood friends live". Focus on Belgium wrote that the song is "set against the background of a message of political appeasement between the north and the south" and "describes all the love she has for her city".

Bruxelles je t′aime is the first song by Angèle that contains lyrics in the Dutch Language.

== Critical reception ==
Zangba Thomson of Bongmines Entertainment commented that "Bruxelles je t'aime" has "a relatable narrative, ear-pleasing French vocals, and tuneful melodies. The likable dance-friendly tune possesses lush instrumentation flavored with an awesome French pop vibration".

== Music video ==
An accompanying music video was released on 21 October 2021 and depicts Angèle dancing and celebrating on a train from Paris to her birthplace, Brussels.

It was nominated for the UK Music Video Awards for Best Production Design in a Video in 2022.

== Charts ==
=== Weekly charts ===
Weekly chart performance for "Bruxelles je t'aime"
Chart (2021–2022)	Peak position
Belgium (Ultratop 50 Flanders)	3
Belgium (Ultratop 50 Wallonia)	1
Czech Republic Airplay (ČNS IFPI)	57
France (SNEP)	8
Switzerland (Schweizer Hitparade)	50

=== Year-end charts ===
2021 year-end chart performance for "Bruxelles je t'aime"
Chart (2021)	Position
Belgium (Ultratop Wallonia)	57
France (SNEP)	187

2022 year-end chart performance for "Bruxelles je t'aime"
Chart (2022)	Position
Belgium (Ultratop Flanders)	50
Belgium (Ultratop Wallonia)	31
France (SNEP)	88

== Certifications ==
Region	Certification	Certified units/sales
Belgium (BRMA)	2× Platinum	80,000^{‡}
France (SNEP)	Platinum	200,000^{‡}
^{‡} Sales+streaming figures based on certification alone.

== Release history ==
Release history for "Bruxelles je t'aime"
Region	Date	Format	Label	Ref.
Various	21 October 2021	Digital download; streaming	Angèle VL	
Italy	19 November 2021	Contemporary hit radio	Universal	
