= Balance ton quoi =

2019 single by Angèle

Single by Angèle

from the album Brol
- Language: French
- Released: 1 March 2019
- Length: 3:09
- Label: Angèle VL Records
- Songwriter(s): Angèle Van Laeken
- Producer(s): Tristan Salvati; Angèle Van Laeken

Angèle singles chronology
"Tout oublier" (2018)	"Balance ton quoi" (2019)	"Flou" (2019)

Music video
- "Balance Ton Quoi" on YouTube

"Balance Ton Quoi" (stylized "Balance ton quoi") (French: [balɑ̃s tɔ̃ kwa]; transl. "Denounce Your What", see next paragraph for context) is a song written and recorded by Belgian singer-songwriter Angèle, for her debut studio album Brol (2018). Produced by Angèle alongside Tristan Salvati, the song was released on March 1, 2019, as the sixth single for Brol.

The title references the #MeToo movement as it plays on the phrase #BalanceTonPorc (meaning "Denounce your pig"), which was popular in France during the movement. Within the song, she candidly commentates on the sexism and misogyny that exists in contemporary society and supports the idea that education is the best way to combat it.

"Balance Ton Quoi" peaked number 1 in Belgium (Wallonia), number 13 in Belgium (Flanders), number 2 in France and number 33 in Switzerland. This song also received a two-time platinum certification from the Belgian Entertainment Association (BEA) and a diamond certification from The Syndicat national de l'édition phonographique (SNEP), making it one of her most successful songs to date.

The music video of the song was directed by Belgian photographer and filmmaker, Charlotte Abramow and premiered on April 15, 2019.

== Background and release ==
"Balance Ton Quoi" was released prior as part of Angéle's debut studio album Brol on October 5, 2018. It was then released as the sixth single of the album on March 1, 2019.

== Music video ==
The music video for the song premiered on April 15, 2019. It was directed by Belgian photographer and filmmaker Charlotte Abramow. French actors Pierre Niney and Antoine Gouy make a cameo within the video as two students in the "anti-sexism academy".

== Credits and personnel ==
Credits adapted from Tidal.

- Angèle – vocals, producer, composer, lyricist, keyboards, programming
- Tristan Salvati – producer, bass (vocal), guitar, keyboards, programming
- Adrien Pallot – mastering engineer, studio personnel
- Chab Mastering – mastering engineer, studio personnel
- Hugo Martinez "Martimix" – mixer, studio personnel

== Charts ==
=== Weekly charts ===
Chart (2019)	Peak position
Belgium (Ultratop 50 Flanders)	13
Belgium (Ultratop 50 Wallonia)	1
France (SNEP)	2
Switzerland (Schweizer Hitparade)	33

=== Year-end charts ===
Chart (2019)	Position
Belgium (Ultratop Flanders)	38
Belgium (Ultratop Wallonia)	2
France (SNEP)	3

Chart (2020)	Position
Belgium (Ultratop Wallonia)	92
France (SNEP)	92

== Certifications ==
Region	Certification	Certified units/sales
Belgium (BRMA)	2× Platinum	80,000^{‡}
France (SNEP)	Diamond	333,333^{‡}
^{‡} Sales+streaming figures based on certification alone.
