= Angèle (singer) =

Belgian singer-songwriter (born 1995)

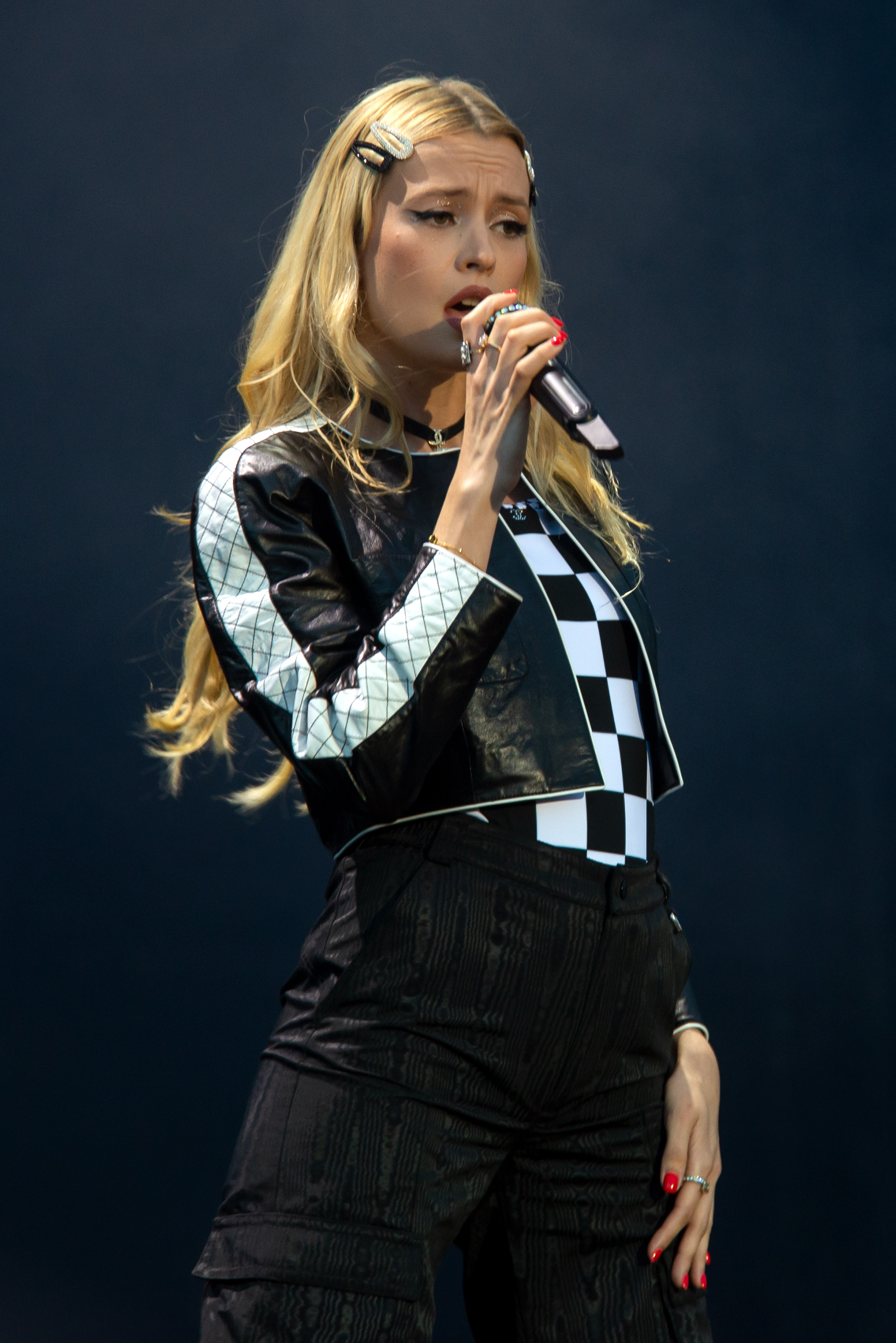
- Angèle performing in 2022
- Born: Angèle Joséphine Aimée Van Laeken; 3 December 1995 (age 30); Uccle, Brussel, Belgium
- Occupations: Singer; songwriter; musician; producer; actress; model
- Parents: Marka (father); Laurence Bibot (mother)
- Relatives: Roméo Elvis (brother)
- Musical career
- Genres: Nouvelle Chanson; pop; electropop
- Instruments: Vocals; piano
- Years active: 2015–present
- Label: Sony Music France
- Website: angelevl.be

Angèle Joséphine Aimée Van Laeken (French: [ɑ̃ʒɛl vɑn lakɛn], Dutch: [ɑ̃ːˈʑɛːlə vɑn ˈlaːkə(n)]; born 3 December 1995), known simply as Angèle, is a Belgian singer and songwriter. She was one of 2018's biggest breakout acts in French and Belgian pop music, breaking Stromae's record for weeks at the top of the Belgian singles charts with her 2018 single "Tout oublier" which features her brother, Roméo Elvis.

== Early life ==
Van Laeken was born on 3 December 1995, in Uccle, in the Brussels-Capital Region, the daughter of singer Marka (Serge Van Laeken) and actress Laurence Bibot. Her brother is the rapper Roméo Elvis.

Her father encouraged her from an early age to learn the piano, which inspired her musical career.

Angèle spent a difficult adolescence in a strict Catholic school before attending the Decroly School. The artistic options at this high school helped develop her musical skills. She then enrolled in the Jazz Studio Antwerp for a jazz education before joining her father's band.

== Career ==
=== 2015–2018: Career beginnings and Brol ===
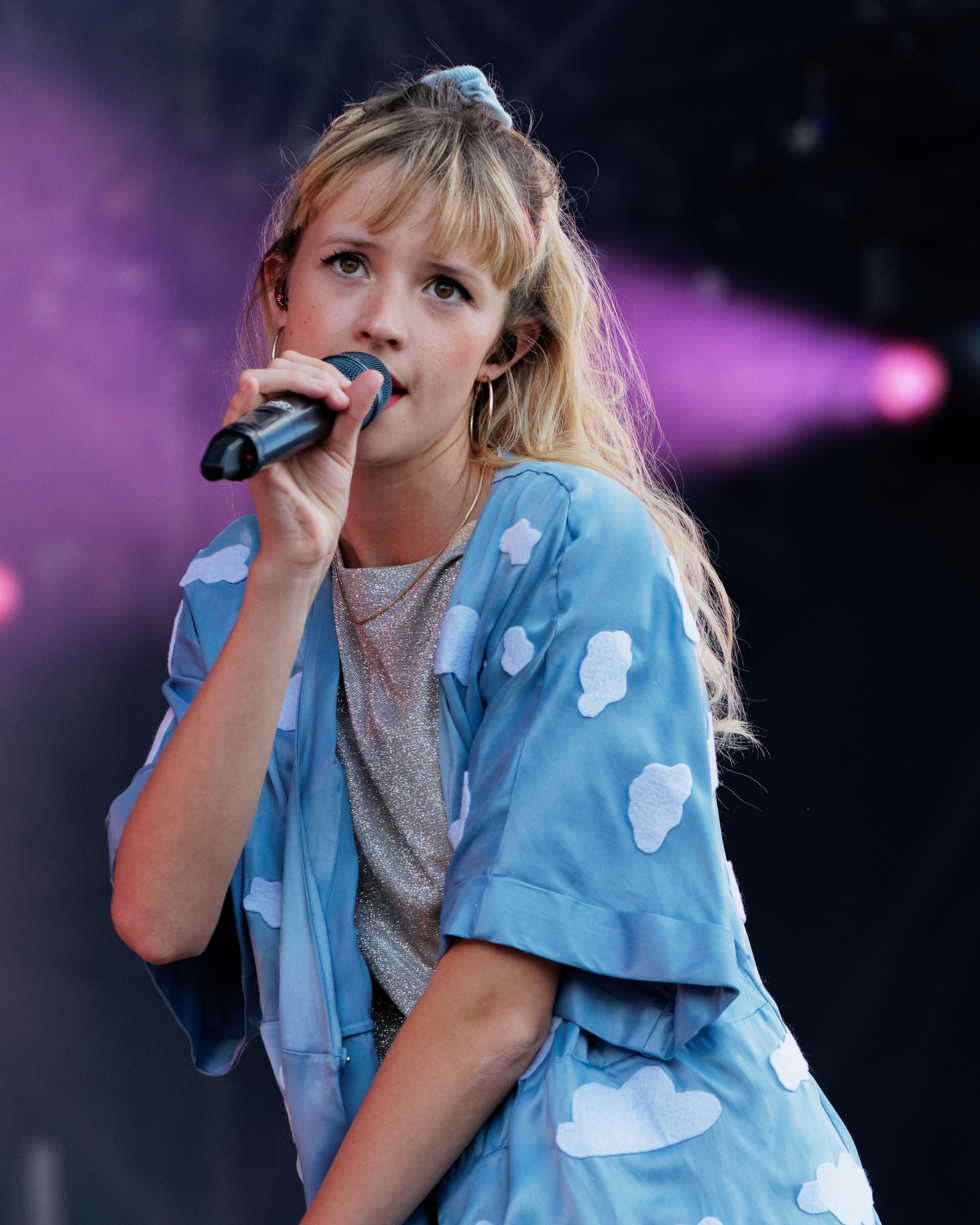
Angèle at the 2018 Vieilles Charrues Festival

Angèle gave her first performances in streets around Brussels, most notably at the restaurant Le Delecta, in Ixelles, now closed. She was first noticed for her cover of Dick Annegarn, "Bruxelles", and on Instagram videos where she mixed singing and comedy. In 2017, she was the support act for Ibeyi and the Belgian rapper Damso, whom she also accompanied in his album Lithopédion. Her first single, "La Loi de Murphy", was released in late 2017 and received millions of views on YouTube.

A second single "Je veux tes yeux" was released in early 2018. The two video clips were directed by the Belgian photographer Charlotte Abramow. In May 2018 she performed her first Parisian concert at the Trianon accompanied by MC Solaar on her cover of his song "Victime de la mode". She performed in several summer festivals in Belgium, France and Switzerland such as Les Ardentes, Dour, Garorock, and Rock Werchter. In 2018, Angèle released her third single, "La Thune".

In August 2018 she announced the tracklist of her first album Brol on the Initial label. The album was released on 5 October 2018, the same day as her single duet with her brother, Roméo Elvis. This album was successful and resulted in Angèle invitation to perform on various French TV shows. The single, "Tout oublier", spent nine weeks at number 1 on the Ultratop charts, breaking the record for a Belgian artist formerly set by Stromae.

=== 2019–2023: Nonante-Cinq ===
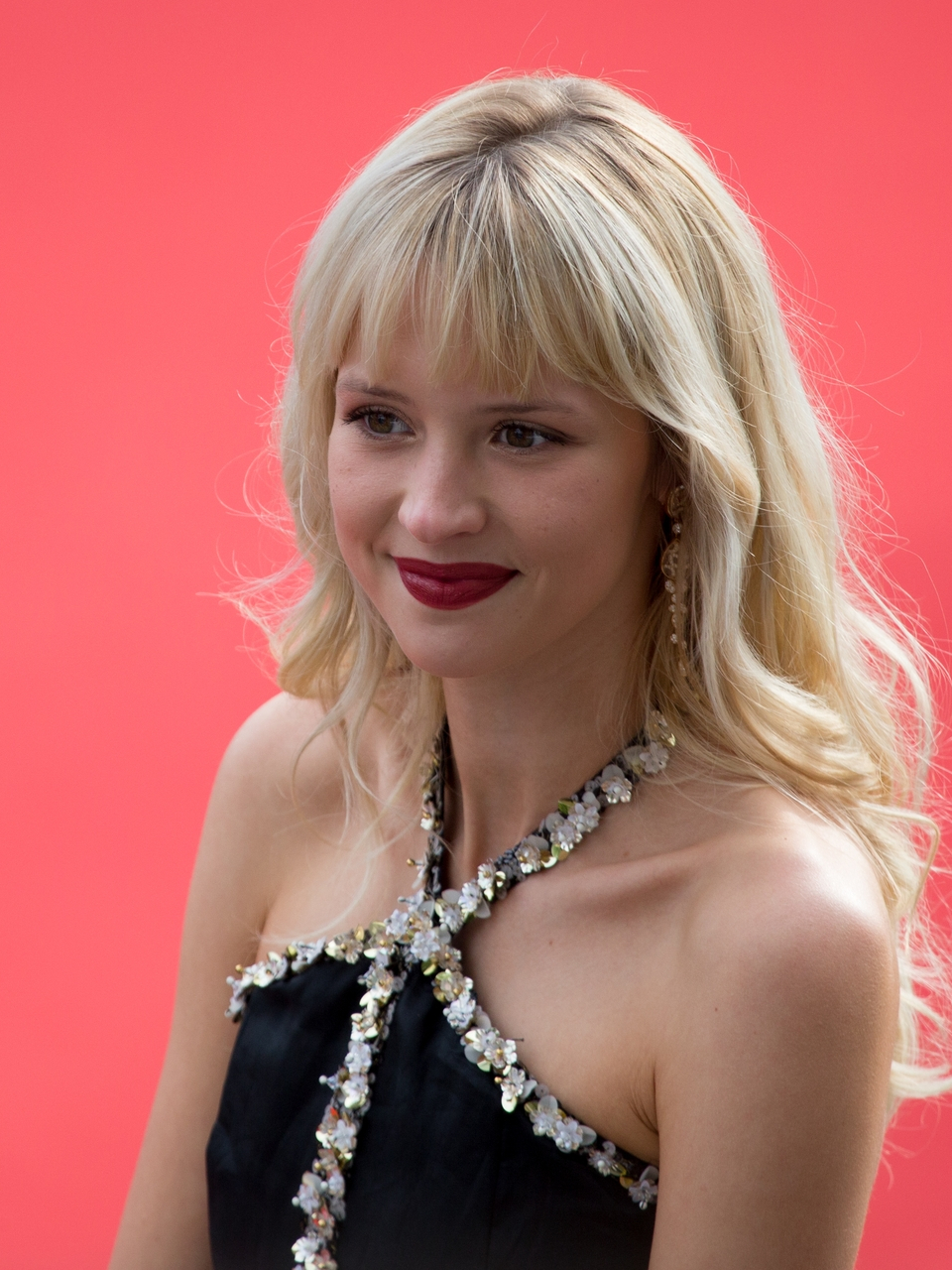
Angèle at the 2019 Cannes Film Festival

In 2019 Angèle became one of the most sought for artists in France and Belgium and affirmed her feminism with the song "Balance ton quoi" in reference to the French #metoo movement, Balance ton porc. Pierre Niney makes an appearance in the video alongside some of Angèle's friends to talk about the struggles her female friends have encountered with men. Angèle became an ambassador for Chanel afterwards. In April 2020 Angèle performed for One World: Together At Home, a global broadcast and digital special to support front-line healthcare workers and the WHO during the COVID-19 pandemic, hosted by Lady Gaga.

In October 2020, Angèle was pictured alongside London singer Dua Lipa on the set of a music video. A collaboration with the latter was later announced and would feature on the reissue of Lipa's new album Future Nostalgia. "Fever" was released on 30 October 2020. The music video was released a week later on 6 November 2020 on YouTube. Before the release of the video, Lipa announced on social media that Angèle would be appearing as a special guest on her live stream concert Studio 2054 on 27 November 2020.

In 2021 Angèle made her film debut in Annette, directed by Leos Carax. Her second studio album, Nonante-Cinq was released on 3 December 2021, her 26th birthday. In 2022, Angèle featured in "Sunflower" from Tamino Amir's second album, Sahar.

=== 2024–present: Paris Olympics and Instinct ===
In 2024 Angèle performed "Nightcall" alongside Kavinsky and Phoenix as part of the Paris Olympics closing ceremony. As a result, "Nightcall" became the most searched-for song in a single day and in a single minute on the musical search site Shazam. In 2025, Angèle released "A Little More," a single featured in an advertising campaign for Chanel fragrance Chance.

On February 27, 2026, Angèle released the first single for her new album in collaboration with Justice, titled "What You Want". On June 22, three days after the release of her previous single "Dis-le", Angèle announced her third studio album, titled Instinct. It was released on October 16, 2026, after the release of third single "Une seule vie" on August of that year.

== Musical influences ==
Angèle is a fan of Ella Fitzgerald and Hélène Ségara. She is inspired by many musical genres from French songs to electronic music and rap, which she disliked as a teenager. She became influenced by rap, particularly while performing with her brother Romeo Elvis and the rappers Caballero and JeanJass.

== Personal life ==
From 2017 to 2019 she dated French dancer and choreographer Léo Walk. She wrote the song "Perdus" which is about the end of their relationship, linked to her new notoriety.

In August 2020 Angèle announced on Instagram that she was dating French actor Marie Papillon, while coming out. They separated the following year. Photos of them were previously published by French tabloid Public in 2019, then discussed in the talk show Touche pas à mon poste !, without Angèle's consent and outing her. In her 2021 self-titled Netflix documentary, Angèle confirmed her bisexuality. Later, in May 2023, Angèle came out as pansexual. In an interview with the French talk show France 2, she said that "[she] can fall in love with a boy, a girl, a non-binary person, or a transgender person." She added that "the feeling of love, having butterflies in your stomach, whether with a girl or a boy, is the same for [her]."

== Tours ==
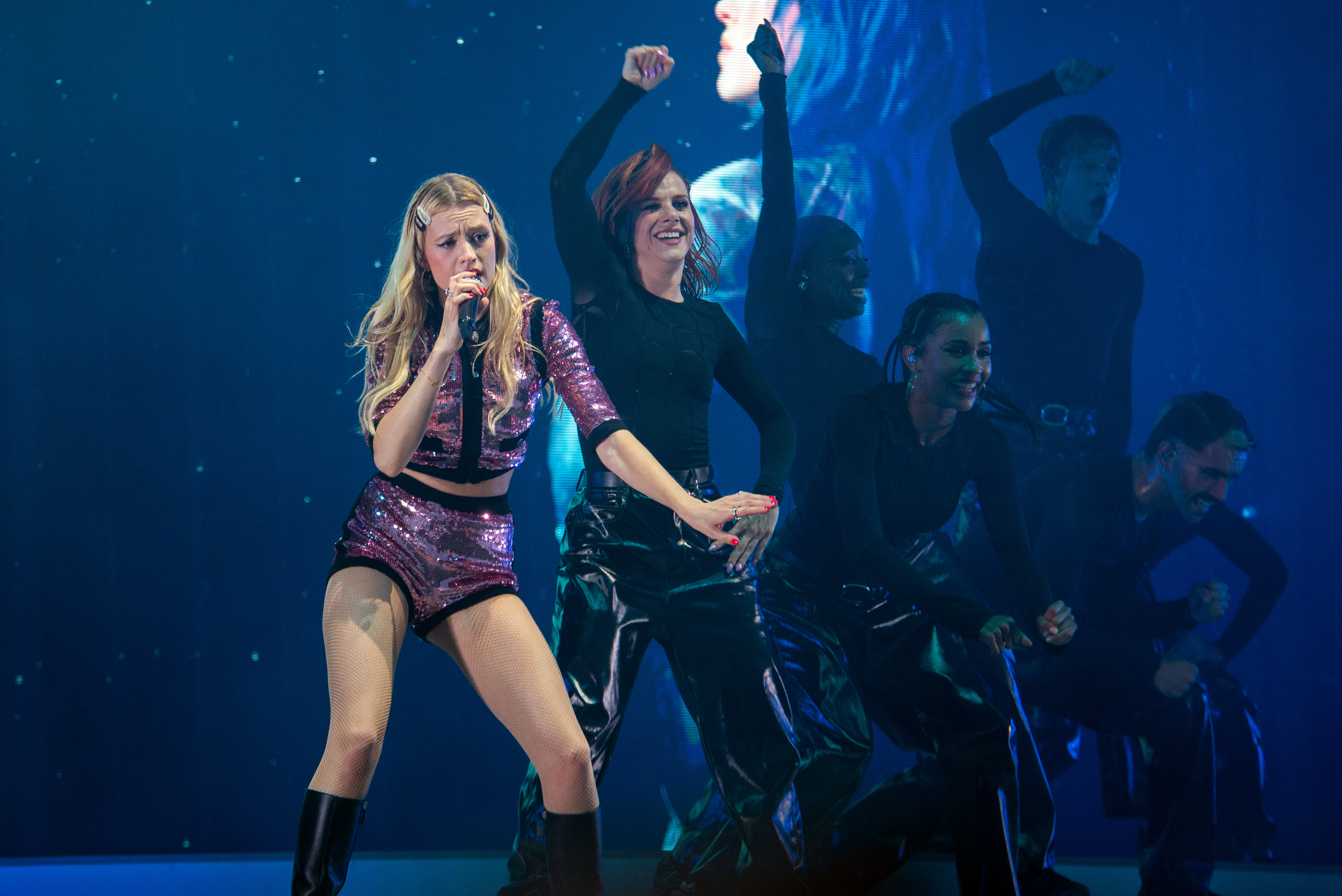
Angèle in 2022

Headlining

- Brol Tour (2018–2020)
- Nonante-Cinq Tour (2022–2023)
- Instinct Tour (2027)

Opening act

- Damso – Ipséité Tour (2017)
- Dua Lipa – Future Nostalgia Tour (2022)

== Discography ==
=== Studio albums ===
List of studio albums, with selected chart positions, sales and certifications
Title	Details	Peak chart positions				Certifications
Title	Details	BEL (WA)	BEL (FL)	FRA	SWI	Certifications
Brol	Released: 5 October 2018; Re-released: 8 November 2019 (Brol La Suite); Label: Angèle VL, Initial Artist; Format: CD, LP, digital download, streaming, box set	1	1	1	7	BEA: 7× Platinum; SNEP: 2× Diamond
Nonante-Cinq	Released: 3 December 2021; Label: Angèle VL, Initial Artist; Format: CD, LP, digital download, streaming	1	3	2	6	BEA: 2× Platinum; SNEP: 3× Platinum
Instinct	Released: 16 October 2026; Label: Angèle VL, Sony Music; Format: CD, LP, digital download, streaming	1	2	1	2	
"—" denotes releases that did not chart.

=== Singles ===
==== As lead artist ====
List of singles, with selected chart positions, showing year released, certifications and album name
Title	Year	Peak chart positions										Certifications	Album
Title	Year	BEL (WA)	BEL (FL)	CAN	FRA	GER	IRL	POR	SWI	UK	WW	Certifications	Album
"La Loi de Murphy"	2017	5	22	—	42	—	—	—	—	—	—	BEA: Platinum; SNEP: Platinum	Brol
"Je veux tes yeux"	2018	16	25	—	60	—	—	—	—	—	—	BEA: Gold; SNEP: Platinum	Brol
"La Thune"	2018	9	39	—	15	—	—	—	—	—	—	BEA: Platinum; SNEP: Diamond	Brol
"Jalousie"	2018	12	—	—	26	—	—	—	—	—	—	BEA: Gold; SNEP: Diamond	Brol
"Tout oublier" (featuring Roméo Elvis)	2018	1	6	—	1	—	—	—	55	—	—	BEA: 3× Platinum; SNEP: Diamond	Brol
"Balance ton quoi"	2019	1	13	—	2	—	—	—	33	—	—	BEA: 3× Platinum; SNEP: Diamond	Brol
"Flou"	2019	2	20	—	34	—	—	—	—	—	—	BEA: Platinum; SNEP: Diamond	Brol
"Perdus"	2019	10	65	—	8	—	—	—	58	—	—	SNEP: Platinum	Brol La Suite
"Oui ou non"	2019	2	9	—	3	—	—	—	11	—	—	BEA: Platinum; SNEP: Diamond	Brol La Suite
"Ta reine"	2020	25	—	—	16	—	—	—	—	—	—	SNEP: Diamond	Brol
"Fever" (with Dua Lipa) (Note: Angèle is credited as a featured artist on the Austrian, German and Swiss release of "Fever".)	2020	1	1	49	1	85	36	104	9	79	69	BEA: 3× Platinum; SNEP: Diamond	Future Nostalgia
"Bruxelles je t'aime"	2021	1	3	—	8	—	—	—	50	—	—	BEA: 2× Platinum; SNEP: Diamond	Nonante-Cinq
"Démons" (featuring Damso)	2021	2	—	—	5	—	—	—	31	—	—	BEA: 2× Platinum; SNEP: Diamond	Nonante-Cinq
"Libre"	2022	3	19	—	31	—	—	—	85	—	—	BEA: Platinum; SNEP: Diamond	Nonante-Cinq
"Amour, haine et danger" (Note: "Amour, haine et danger" is included on the re-issue of the digital version of Nonante Cinq.)	2022	8	45	—	82	—	—	—	—	—	—	SNEP: Gold	Nonante-Cinq
"Évidemment" (with Orelsan)	2022	10	—	—	4	—	—	—	65	—	—	BEA: Gold; SNEP: Diamond	Civilisation
"Le temps fera les choses"	2023	30	—	—	188	—	—	—	—	—	—		Nonante-Cinq
"Plus de sens"	2023	17	—	—	50	—	—	—	—	—	—	SNEP: Gold	Nonante-Cinq
"Nightcall" (with Kavinsky and Phoenix)	2024	15	32	—	3	—	—	—	—	—	—	SNEP: Diamond	Non-album single
"What You Want" (with Justice)	2026	1	32	—	19	—	—	—	99	—	—	SNEP: Platinum	Instinct
"Dis-le"	2026	10	—	—	—	—	—	—	—	—	—		Instinct
"Une seule vie"	2026	1	—	—	65	—	—	—	—	—	—		Instinct
"—" denotes a recording that did not chart or was not released in that country.

==== As featured artist ====
List of singles as featured artist, with selected chart positions, showing year released, certifications and album name
Title	Year	Peak chart positions			Certifications	Album
Title	Year	BEL (WA)	FRA	ITA	Certifications	Album
"J'ai vu" (Roméo Elvis x Le Motel featuring Angèle)	2017	79	164	—	SNEP: Platinum	Morale 2
"S'en aller" (Swing featuring Angèle)	2020	—	156	—		Alt F4
"Sempre / Jamais" (Mahmood featuring Angèle)	2024	12	167	85		Nei letti degli altri
"—" denotes a recording that did not chart or was not released in that country.

=== Other charted songs ===
List of other charted songs, with selected chart positions, showing year released, certifications and album name
Title	Year	Peak chart positions		Certifications	Album
Title	Year	FRA	SWI	Certifications	Album
"Silence" (Damso featuring Angèle)	2018	3	48	SNEP: Diamond	Lithopédion
"Nombreux"	2018	40	—	SNEP: Platinum	Brol
"Victime des réseaux"	2018	58	—	SNEP: Gold	Brol
"Les matins"	2018	50	—	SNEP: Platinum	Brol
"Flemme"	2018	63	—	SNEP: Gold	Brol
"Insomnies"	2019	28	—		Brol La Suite
"Tu me regardes"	2019	20	—	SNEP: Platinum	Brol La Suite
"J'entends"	2019	31	—	SNEP: Gold	Brol La Suite
"Que du love" (featuring Kiddy Smile)	2019	45	—	SNEP: Gold	Brol La Suite
"On s'habitue"	2021	46	—		Nonante-Cinq
"Solo"	2021	40	—	SNEP: Gold	Nonante-Cinq
"Pensées positives"	2021	53	—		Nonante-Cinq
"Taxi"	2021	41	—	SNEP: Platinum	Nonante-Cinq
"Tempête"	2021	49	—		Nonante-Cinq
"Profite"	2021	61	—		Nonante-Cinq
"Mots justes"	2021	76	—		Nonante-Cinq
"Mauvais rêves"	2021	66	—		Nonante-Cinq
"—" denotes a recording that did not chart or was not released in that country.

== Filmography ==
=== Film ===
Key
†	Denotes productions that have not yet been released

Year	Title	Role	Notes
2019	Toy Story 4	Gabby Gabby (Voice)	French dubbing
2021	Annette	Six Accuser's member	
2021	Space Jam: A New Legacy	Lola Bunny (Voice)	French dubbing
2021	Angèle	Herself	Documentary
2023	Asterix & Obelix: The Middle Kingdom	Panacea (Falbala)	

=== Television ===
Year	Title	Role	Notes
2020	La Flamme	Anna	2 episodes
2021	Marie et les Choses	Barmaid	1 episode

== Awards and nominations ==
=== Berlin Music Video Awards ===
The Berlin Music Video Awards is an international festival that promotes the art of music videos.

Year	Award	Nomination	Result
2022	Best Art Director	BRUXELLES JE T'AIME	Nominated

=== Red Bull Elektropedia Awards ===
Year	Award	Nomination	Result	Reference
2018	Artist of the year	Herself	Won	
2018	Best Song	Herself	Won	
2018	Breakthrough Artist/ Producer	Herself	Won	
2018	Best Video	"La loi de Murphy" & "Je veux tes yeux"	Won	

=== D6bels Music Awards ===
The D6bels Music Awards is a musical event organized by RTBF, a public radio and television service of the French Community of Belgium.

Year	Award	Nomination	Result	Reference
2018	Album of the year	"Brol"	Won	
2018	Female solo artist	Herself	Won	
2018	Chanson française	Herself	Won	
2018	Concert	Herself	Nominated	
2018	Musician	Herself	Nominated	
2018	Author/composer	Herself	Nominated	
2018	Videoclip	"La thune"	Nominated	
2018	Hit	"La loi de Murphy"	Nominated	

=== MTV Europe Music Awards ===
Year	Award	Nomination	Result	Reference
2018	Best Belgian Act	Herself	Nominated	
2020	Best Belgian Act	Herself	Won	

=== Music Industry Awards ===
The MIA's, in full Music Industry Awards, are Flemish music prizes that are awarded by the VRT in collaboration with Music Centre Flanders.

Year	Award	Nomination	Result	Reference
2018	Album	"Brol"	Nominated	
2018	Artwork	"Brol"	Won	
2018	Author/composer	Herself	Nominated	
2018	Breakthrough	Herself	Won	
2018	Female solo	Herself	Won	
2018	Pop	Herself	Nominated	
2018	Videoclip	"La loi de Murphy"	Nominated	
2019	Song of the year	"Tout oublier"	Won	
2019	Female solo	Herself	Won	
2019	Pop	Herself	Won	
2019	Live Act	Herself	Won	
2019	Videoclip	"Balance ton quoi"	Won	
2022	Hit of the Year 2020	"Oui ou non"	Nominated	
2022	Hit of the Year 2021	"Fever" (with Dua Lipa)	Won	
2022	Female solo	Herself	Won	
2022	Pop	Herself	Won	
2022	Author/componist	Herself	Nominated	
2022	Videoclip	"Bruxelles je t'aime"	Nominated	
2024	Videoclip	"Sunflower" (with Tamino)	Won	

=== Victoires de la Musique ===
Victoires de la Musique is an annual French award ceremony where the Victoire accolade is delivered by the French Ministry of Culture to recognize outstanding achievement in the music industry that recognizes the best musical artists of the year. The awards are the French equivalent to the Grammy Awards and the Brit Awards for music, and it is one of the major awards in France.

Year	Award	Nomination	Result	Reference
2019	Album revelation	"Brol"	Won	
2019	Audiovisual creation	"Tout oublier"	Won	
2020	Female artist	Herself	Nominated	
2020	Concert	"Brol Tour"	Won	
2020	Audiovisual creation	"Balance ton quoi"	Nominated	
2022	Original song	"Bruxelles je t'aime"	Nominated	
2022	Audiovisual creation	"Bruxelles je t'aime"	Nominated	
2023	Female artist	Herself	Won	
2023	Album	Nonante-Cinq	Nominated	
2023	Most streamed album by an artist	Nonante-Cinq	Won	

=== NRJ Music Awards ===
Year	Award	Nomination	Result	Reference
2019	Best French duo	Angèle & Roméo Elvis	Nominated (2nd place)	
2019	Best French female	Herself	Won	
2019	Best French song	Tout oublier	Won	
2019	Best Music Video	Tout oublier	Nominated (2nd place)	
2020	International Female Artist of the Year	Herself	Nominated	
2022	Female Artist of the Year	Herself	Won	
2022	Best Music Video	Démons	Nominated	
2022	French Collaboration of the Year	Démons	Nominated	

=== UK Music Video Awards ===
Year	Award	Nomination	Result	Reference
2021	Best Color Grading in a Video	"Fever" (with Dua Lipa)	Nominated	
