= Roméo Elvis =

Belgian rapper (born 1992)

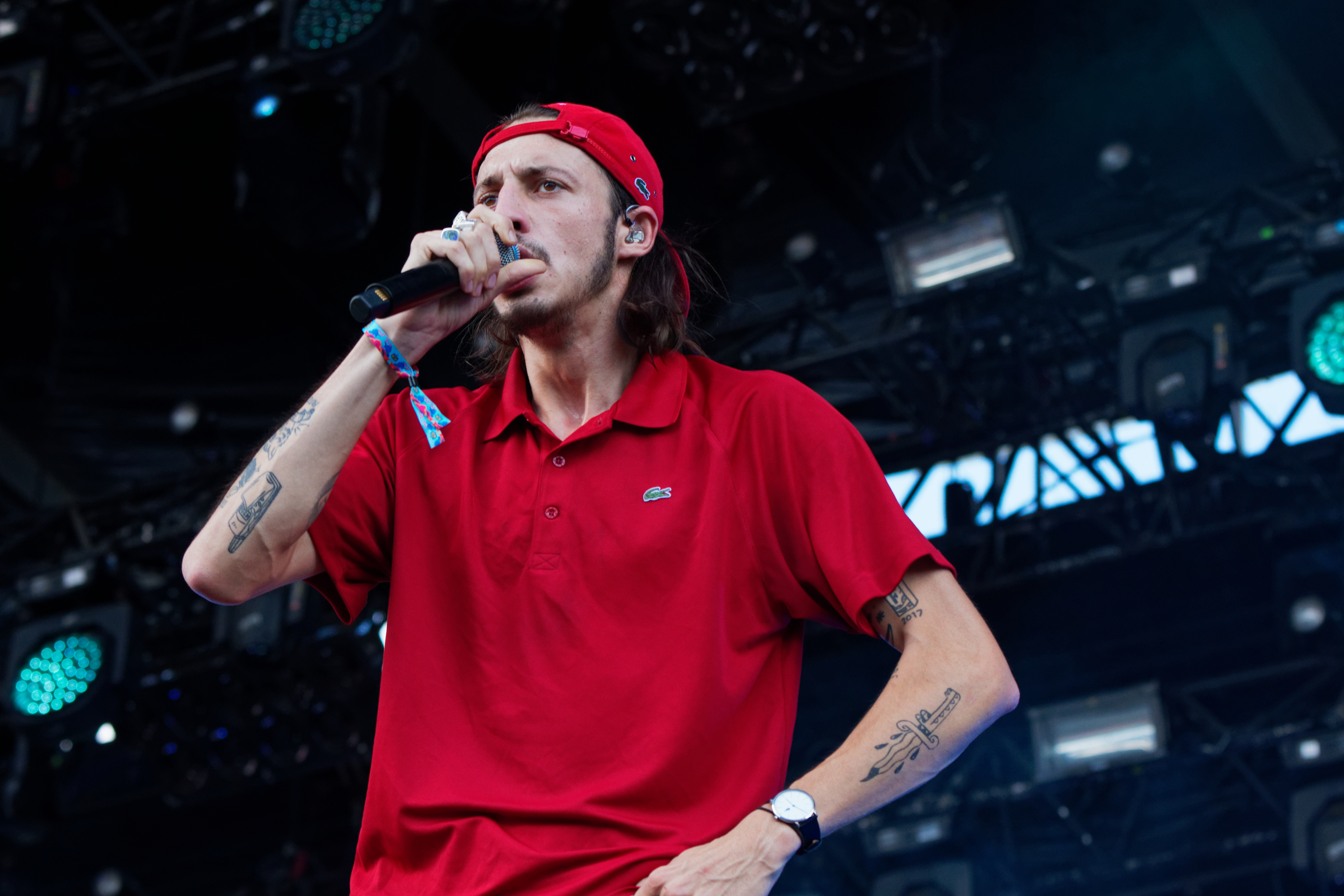
- Elvis in 2018

Background information
- Born: Roméo Johnny Elvis Kiki Van Laeken; 13 December 1992 (age 33); Uccle, Brussels, Belgium
- Genres: Hip hop; alternative hip hop
- Occupations: Rapper; record producer; singer
- Instruments: Vocals; guitar; piano
- Years active: 2012–present
- Labels: Daring Music; L'Œil Écoute Laboratoire; back in the dayz
- Website: romeoelvis.com

Roméo Johnny Elvis Kiki Van Laeken (French: [ʁɔmeo vɑ̃ lakɛn], Flemish: [roːˈmeːjoː vɑn ˈlaːkə(n)]; born 13 December 1992), better known by his stage name Roméo Elvis, is a Belgian rapper and record producer.

His career began with the release of two EPs in 2013 and 2014, titled Bruxelles c'est devenu la jungle and Famille nombreuse. In 2016, his album EP Morale was released. In 2017 and 2018, two more albums were released: Morale 2 and his reissue Morale 2 luxe (released from his collaboration with producer Le Motel). In 2019, he released an album titled Chocolat and another album in 2022 titled Tout Peut Arriver. He has close connections with Belgian band L'Or du Commun, hip hop duo Caballero & JeanJass, and French rapper Lomepal.

== Biography ==
Roméo van Laeken was born on 13 December 1992 in Uccle, Belgium, to a family of French-speaking Belgian artists. His father Serge Van Laeken, better known as Marka, is a singer and songwriter. His mother Laurence Bibot is a comedian, and his younger sister Angèle is an international singer-songwriter. Interested in music since his youth, he developed a style distinct from that of other members of his family. Roméo Elvis was raised in Linkebeek, in the southern suburbs of Brussels, and later relocated to Forest.

After primary school, he continued his secondary studies at Saint-Luc Tournai Institute where he learned to paint and draw. It was during this time that Elvis began rapping with his friends. His artistic training continued at ESA 75, in Brussels, where he studied photo-journalism. While continuing to practice rap, he became close to members of L'Or du Commun.

While his first EPs were being released, Roméo Elvis was working as a cashier at the supermarket chain Carrefour. Despite his success, he was not able to earn enough money from rapping alone. Shortly before the release of the album Bruxelles arrive, he quit his job and devoted himself solely to music. In 2016, Elvis and producer Le Motel released the EP Morale, which was a musical breakthrough for Elvis in Belgium and in France. Morale was followed in March 2017 by the studio album Morale 2, which was reissued in February 2018 as the double record Morale 2luxe.

In 2019, Elvis collaborated with French sportswear brand Lacoste to create a limited collection. That same year, he released his first solo album Chocolat, which features guest appearances from Matthieu Chedid and Damon Albarn.

In 2020, Elvis was the subject of allegations of sexual assault on social networks (see Controversies) which led to Elvis issuing a public statement in which he apologized for what he described as "inappropriate" behavior. Although no complaints were filed against him, several brands and artists ended their collaboration with Elvis.

In 2022, Elvis released his second solo album Tout peut arriver.

== Musical style and influence ==
The musical style of Roméo Elvis has evolved with the progression of his projects. While developing old-school instrumentals and a flow with similar ambiance to his first two EPs, his collaboration with the producer Le Motel on Morale and Morale 2 profoundly changed his style. He currently allows himself to make more refrains and add electronic instrumentals, and in accord with the jazz of Le Motel, giving them a more current tone.

Elvis's influences are numerous: the Belgian group L'or du Commun with which he made his rapping debut is one of his main ones. Their style can also be recognized in his first two projects with group members. He also frequently mentions the rapper Caballero as someone who greatly inspired him; they met while Bruxelles arrive was being recorded. Concerning French rap, Elvis considers the rapper Alpha Wann of the group 1995 as "the rap master playing for me in terms of placement and in terms of how to say things in a very meaningful way". Fuzati, leader of Klub des Loosers, strongly influences the rapper. Primarily in his somber aspect, but also in the manner that the rapper holds plenty of derision towards life. He also references the masked rapper in many of his titles, like in Drôle de décision. Elvis is also a fan of the French artist Philippe Katerine.

== Concerts and tours ==
While he began performing at concerts while growing closer to L'Or du Commun, it was during the release of Morale, in 2015, that Roméo Elvis and Le Motel began touring, with 19 performances across Belgium, France, and Luxembourg. The release of Morale 2 also marked the beginning of another, bigger tour with 29 performances and concerts in several large festivals such as Dour Festival, Rock en Seine, le Printemps de Bourges, and Garorock.

== Personal life ==
Elvis suffers from tinnitus, common among musicians. He has made references to this condition in many of his titles, such as L'oreille sifflante and Ma tête. In an interview with Radio Nova, he explained that if he could earn a substantial income from rapping he would donate some of it to fight the disease.

== Controversies ==
In September 2020, an anonymous user of the social network Instagram shared content in which she accused Elvis of sexual assault. Elvis later issued a statement on social networks in which he apologized for what he described as inappropriate gestures, and called himself "an example not to follow". The affair drew attention on social networks, occurring in the context of online social movement #BalanceTonRappeur ("Denounce Your Rapper", in reference to the #MeToo movement) that began earlier that month, when rapper Moha La Squale was under investigation for allegations of sexual abuse and acts of violence, and following with other French-language rappers being the subjects of allegations of sexual assault. Consequently, French sportswear company Lacoste announced the end of their collaboration with both Elvis and Moha La Squale. Belgian confectionery company Galler, which had produced chocolate bars with Elvis's image, removed all references to their collaboration on its website, according to news network RTBF. On the same week, Fuzati, founder of hip-hop project Klub Des Loosers, was releasing his latest studio album Vanité, which included a track featuring Roméo Elvis; Fuzati then announced that all verses sung by Elvis would be removed from the digital edition of the track. Congolese-Belgian rapper Damso also declared he would end his upcoming collaboration with Elvis.

== Discography ==
=== Albums ===
| Year | Album | Peak positions | | | | Certification |
| Year | Album | BEL (Fl) | BEL (Wa) | FRA | SWI | Certification |
|---|---|---|---|---|---|---|
| 2016 | Morale (Roméo Elvis x Le Motel) | — | 57 | — | — | |
| 2017 | Morale 2 (Roméo Elvis x Le Motel) | 29 | 3 | 6 | 39 | SNEP: Platinum |
| 2019 | Chocolat | 4 | 1 | 3 | 5 | BEA: Gold; SNEP: Platinum |
| 2022 | Tout peut arriver | 22 | 1 | 6 | 40 | |
| 2023 | Les galeries | — | 21 | 65 | — | |
| 2024 | Écho | — | 24 | 72 | — | |

Others

- 2018: Morale 2Luxe (with Le Motel)

=== EPs ===
- 2013: Bruxelles c'est devenu la jungle
- 2014: Famille nombreuse
- 2016: Morale (with Le Motel)
- 2020: Maison

=== Singles ===
| Year | Title | Peak positions | | | | Certification | Album |
| Year | Title | BEL (Fl) | BEL (Wa) | FRA | SWI | Certification | Album |
|---|---|---|---|---|---|---|---|
| 2017 | "Diable" (Roméo Elvis x Le Motel) | 61 | Tip | – | – | | Morale 2 |
| 2017 | "Drôle de question" (Roméo Elvis x Le Motel) | 56 | 54 | 89 | – | SNEP: Gold | Morale 2 |
| 2017 | "Lenita" (Roméo Elvis x Le Motel) | 69 | Tip | – | – | | Morale 2 |
| 2017 | "J'ai vu" (Roméo Elvis x Le Motel feat. Angèle) | – | 79 | 164 | – | SNEP: Gold | Morale 2 |
| 2017 | "Méchant" | – | 64 | – | – | | non-album single |
| 2018 | "Dessert" (Roméo Elvis x Le Motel) | Tip | 53 | 181 | – | | Morale 2 (Deluxe) |
| 2018 | "300 (Henri) – Colors Session" (Roméo Elvis x Le Motel) | – | Tip | 181 | – | | non-album single |
| 2019 | "Malade" | 59 | 2 | 7 | 66 | SNEP: Gold | Chocolat |
| 2019 | "Normal" | – | 26 | 80 | – | | Chocolat |
| 2019 | "Soleil" | 66 | 7 | 11 | – | SNEP: Platinum | Chocolat |
| 2022 | "Quand je marche (comme Ben Mazué)" | — | 49 | — | — | | Tout peut arriver |
| 2025 | "Ceiling" (with Oscar and the Wolf) | — | 44 | — | — | | Non-album singles |
| 2026 | "Kiss the Grass (Allez allez)" (with Sylvie Kreusch) | 37 | — | — | — | | Non-album singles |

=== Featured in ===
| Year | Title | Peak positions | | | | Certification | Album |
| Year | Title | BEL (Fl) | BEL (Wa) | FRA | SWI | Certification | Album |
|---|---|---|---|---|---|---|---|
| 2017 | "Acid" (Ulysse feat. Roméo Elvis) | Tip | 84 | – | – | | Ulysse album SURF |
| 2017 | "Apollo" (L'Or du Commun feat. Roméo Elvis) | – | Tip | – | – | | L'Or du Commun album Zeppelin |
| 2017 | "Hit Sale" (Therapie Taxi feat. Roméo Elvis) | – | 1 | 12 | – | BEA: Gold; SNEP: Diamond | Therapie Taxi album Hit Sale |
| 2018 | "On & On" (Her feat. AnnenMayKantereit & Roméo Elvis) | – | 72 | – | – | | Her album Her |
| 2018 | "Incroyaux" (Caballero & JeanJass feat. Roméo Elvis) | – | 46 | 115 | – | | Caballero & JeanJass album Double hélice 3 |
| 2018 | "1000 °C" (Lomepal feat. Roméo Elvis) | Tip | 17 | 3 | 82 | SNEP: Gold | Lomepal album Jeannine |
| 2018 | "Tout oublier" (Angèle feat. Roméo Elvis) | 6 | 1 | 1 | 55 | BEA: Platinum; SNEP: Diamond | Angèle album Brol |
| 2020 | "Pharmacist" (Mr. Oizo featuring Roméo Elvis) | | | | | | TBA |

=== Other songs ===
| Year | Title | Peak positions | | Album |
| Year | Title | FRA | BEL (Wa) | Album |
|---|---|---|---|---|
| 2019 | "Chocolat" | 37 | — | Chocolat |
| 2019 | "Coeur des hommes" | 45 | — | Chocolat |
| 2019 | "Parano" (feat. -M-) | 46 | — | Chocolat |
| 2019 | "Bobo" | 65 | — | Chocolat |
| 2019 | "Solo" | 74 | — | Chocolat |
| 2019 | "194" | 81 | — | Chocolat |
| 2019 | "Intro (Chocolat)" | 89 | — | Chocolat |
| 2019 | "Viseur" | 104 | — | Chocolat |
| 2019 | "3 Étoiles" | 110 | — | Chocolat |
| 2019 | "Dis-moi" | 126 | — | Chocolat |
| 2019 | "Kuneditdoen" (feat. Zwangere Guy) | 128 | — | Chocolat |
| 2019 | "La Belgique Afrique" | 130 | — | Chocolat |
| 2019 | "En silence" (feat. Témé) | 131 | — | Chocolat |
| 2019 | "T'es bonne" | 152 | — | Chocolat |
| 2019 | "Perdu" (feat. Damon Albarn) | 153 | — | Chocolat |
| 2019 | "Interlude (Chocolat)" | 164 | — | Chocolat |
| 2020 | "Défoncé" | 49 | 46 | Maison |
| 2020 | "Chaud" | 51 | — | Maison |
| 2020 | "Gonzo" | 84 | — | Maison |
| 2020 | "Vinci" | 112 | — | Maison |
| 2020 | "Interlude" | 167 | — | Maison |

=== Collaborations ===
- 2013: L'Or du Commun – Lotus Bleu (feat. Roméo Elvis), in their EP L'Origine
- 2013: L'Or du Commun – Mon Voisin (feat. Roméo Elvis), in L'Or du Commun's EP L'Origine
- 2015: Primero – Deuxième Ombre (feat. Roméo Elvis), in Primero's EP Scénarios
- 2015: Primero – Présidentielles (feat. Roméo Elvis), in Primero's EP Scénarios
- 2015: Stikstof – Dobberman (feat. Roméo Elvis), in Stikstof's album Stikstof/02
- 2016: L'Or du Commun – Mouton Noir (feat. Original Flow Mastaz and Roméo Elvis)
- 2016: Phasm – Souvent (feat. Roméo Elvis), in Phasm's mixtape Phasmixtape Vol. 1
- 2017: Caballero & JeanJass – Vrai ou faux (feat. Roméo Elvis), in their album Double Hélice 2
- 2017: Heystap Squad – Pression (feat. Roméo Elvis), in their EP Pression
- 2017: L'Or du Commun – Apollo (feat. Roméo Elvis), in their EP Zeppelin
- 2017: Lomepal – Billet (feat. Roméo Elvis), in his album Flip
- 2017: Lord Esperanza – Infiniment Vôtre (feat. Roméo Elvis), in his album Polaroïd
- 2017: Roméo Elvis – Carrière, in The Alchemist's EP Paris L.A. Bruxelles
- 2017: Therapie Taxi – Hit Sale (feat. Roméo Elvis), in their album Hit Sale
- 2017: Ulysse – Acid (feat. Roméo Elvis)
- 2017: Zwangere Guy – Low & Lowgisch (feat. Roméo Elvis), in his mixtape Zwangerschapsverlof Vol.3
- 2018: Caballero & JeanJass – Incroyaux (feat. Roméo Elvis), in their album Double Hélice 3
- 2018: Di-Meh – Ride (feat. Roméo Elvis), in Di-Meh's album Focus Part. 2
- 2018: Her – On and On (feat. Roméo Elvis et AnnenMayKantereit), in the album Her
- 2018: Le 77 – La Sape (feat. Roméo Elvis), in their album Bawlers
- 2018: Myth Syzer – Ouais Bébé (feat. Roméo Elvis et Ichon), in his album Bisous
- 2018: Myth Syzer – Tocard (feat. Roméo Elvis), in his album Bisous
- 2018: Roméo Elvis – Il m'a trompé, on DJ Weedim's mixtape La Boulangerie Française Vol.2
- 2018: Roméo Elvis – Méchant, on the original band of Tueurs
- 2018: Senamo – C'est mon boulot (feat. Roméo Elvis), in Senamo's album Poison Bleu
- 2018: Slimka – Crazy Horses (feat. Roméo Elvis et Malala), in Slimka's mixtape No Bad Vol.2
- 2018: Lomepal – 1000 °C (feat. Roméo Elvis)
- 2018: Angèle – Tout oublier (feat. Roméo Elvis) in her album Brol
- 2022: YellowStraps - MERCI (feat. Swing, Roméo Elvis)
- 2022: Primero - Deux deux (feat. Roméo Elvis)
- 2022: Kyo Itachi - Bizentin (feat. Roméo Elvis)
- 2022: Sky - Ganjalove (feat. Roméo Elvis)
- 2022: GUTTI - WOWOWO (feat. Roméo Elvis)

== Awards and nominations ==
=== NRJ Music Awards ===
| Year | Category | Work | Result | Ref. |
|---|---|---|---|---|
| 2019 | Francophonic Breakthrough Act | Herself | Nominated | |
| 2019 | Francophonic Group/Duo | Angèle & Roméo Elvis | Nominated | |
| 2019 | Video of the Year | Tout oublier Feat Angèle | Nominated | |
| 2019 | Francophonic Song of the Year | Tout oublier Feat Angèle | Won | |

=== Red Bull Elektropedia Award ===
| Year | Category | Work | Result | Ref. |
|---|---|---|---|---|
| 2016 | Artist of the year | Herself | Nominated | |
| 2016 | Best Live Act | Herself | Won | |
| 2016 | Chase Awards (Urban) | Herself | Won | |
| 2016 | Breakthrough artist/DJ/Producer/M | Herself | Nominated | |
| 2016 | Best Album | Roméo Evis x Le Motel - Morale | Won | |
| 2016 | Best Song | Roméo Elvis x Caballero - Bruxelles arrive | Nominated | |

=== Berlin Music Video Awards ===
| Year | Category | Work | Result |
|---|---|---|---|
| 2019 | Best Cinematography | normal | Nominated |
| 2019 | Most Bizarre | L’AMOUR AVEC DES CROCOS | Nominated |
