= Marka (singer) =

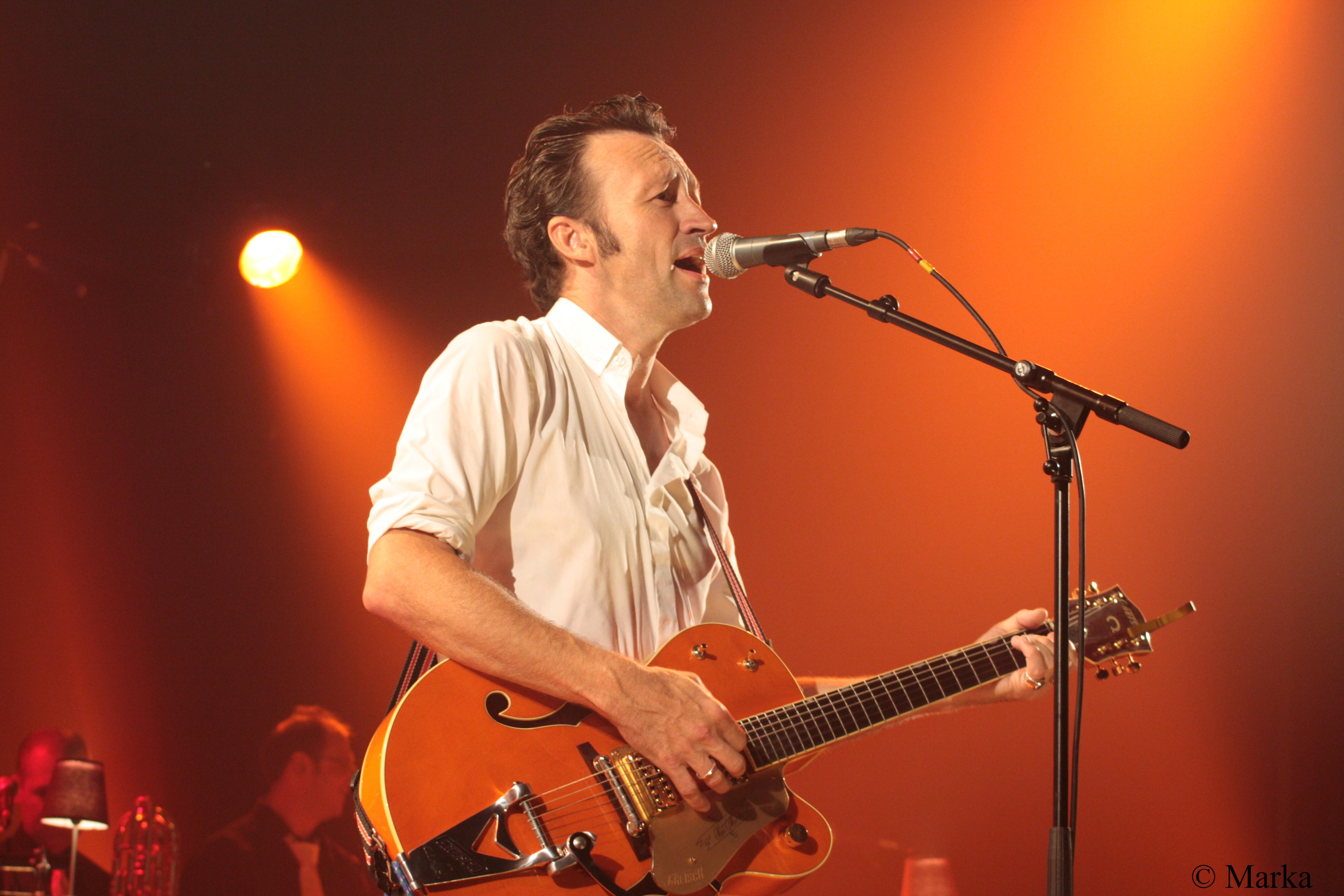

Background information
- Born: Serge Van Laeken; 27 May 1961 (age 64); Watermael-Boitsfort, Belgium
- Genres: Pop rock
- Occupations: Singer; songwriter; composer; film-maker
- Instrument: Guitar
- Years active: 1978/81–present
- Website: www.marka.be

Serge Van Laeken (born 27 May 1961), known as Marka, is a Belgian singer, songwriter, composer and film-maker.

== Early life ==
Serge Van Laeken was born into a Flemish family and grew up in the bilingual Brussels municipality of Molenbeek. Since his parents were very busy, he was brought up mainly by his grandparents. His childhood was untroubled and he spent a good part of his time playing football with his friends. He was given the nickname Markassou by an African friend and it was later shortened to Marka.

== Career ==
Marka bought his first guitar in 1978 and then began performing with small groups in Brussels. He joined the group Allez Allez in 1981. In February 1983 he formed Les Cactus and released his first solo album in 1992. In March 1995 he signed a contract with Columbia France for three albums and released as singles two of the tracks which were to sell the best, "Accouplés" et "La Poupée Barbue". "L'Idiomatic" was released in 1997.

Two months after its release, "Accouplés" was removed from French radio playlists in the wake of the terrorist attacks of summer 1995. Marka was new to the French market and he was thought to be an Arab singer. The song includes elements of Arab music, which would have been familiar to Marka, as his home town had a large North African community.

The album L'homme qui aimait la scène was released in 1998. It included a version of MC Solaar's "Caroline", and this was later issued as a single.

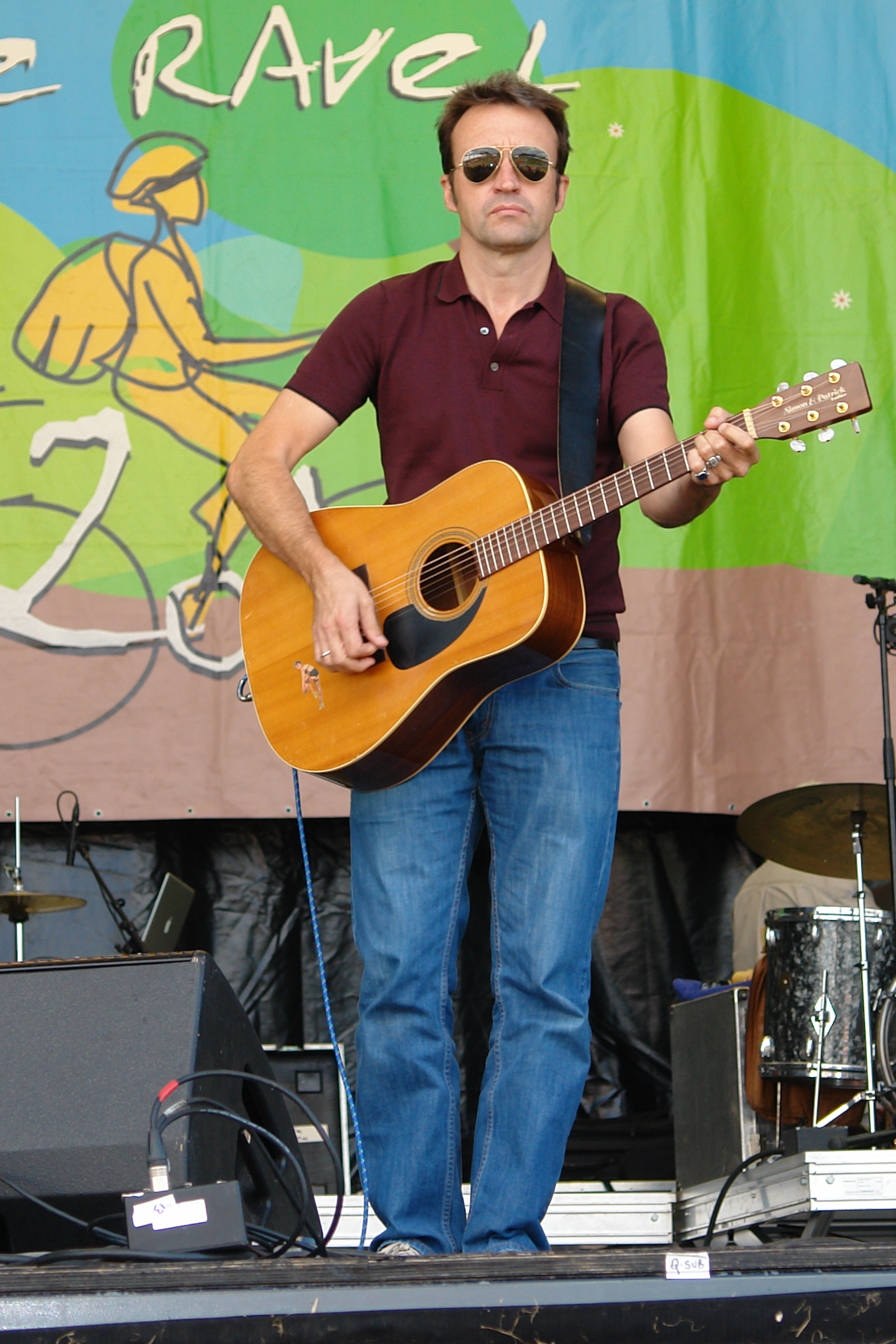
Marka performing in 2012

In 1999 Marka teamed up with his wife, Laurence Bibot, a comedy actress and humorist, and they performed a show called À nous deux at Le Botanique. He released a live recording of the show under his own label, Daring Music.

Marka wrote the official anthem for Les Francofolies de Spa in 2000. Then in 2001 the album Avant-Après was released, with "Letches Bong", "Comment te le dire" et "Je parle". The single "L'Etat c'est moi" was released in 2003 and in the same year Marka signed a contract with Inca Music in France. A French version of Avant-après was issued. In 2004 he recorded a "best of" album, issued under the name C'est tout moi. This included some unpublished titles : "Reine et Roi", "L'Etat c'est moi" and "13ème mois" a collaboration with MC Solaar.

Also in 2004 Marka recorded the music for a short film by Kamel Cherif called Signe d'appartenance. The film was awarded the Silver Lion at the Venice Film Festival.

In 2005 Marka set off on his Aktion Man tour, performing in Tokyo, Beijing, Hanoi and Ho Chi Minh City. The following year an album was released.

Then in 2007 Marka and Laurence Bibot formed an electro pop rock duo called Monsieur et Madame. They appeared in shows in New York and in Belgium. In the same year shooting took place for the documentary film Travestis. The album Monsieur et Madame appeared the following year.

In 2008 he teamed up with a Cuban group, La Sonora Cubana. Their tour gave rise to an album, Marka y La Sonora Cubana, which included the track "Yo Hablo", and a documentary film called Señor Marka. The following year he began writing a new album and also made the documentary Si j'étais japonais. Then in 2010 Marka collaborated with lyricists Jacques Duvall and Thierry Robberecht to produce an album titled Made in Liège.

== Style and other ventures ==
Passionate about football and the club FC Brussels, which was based in Molenbeek until its demise, he has appeared on a radio programme called Il va y avoir du sport, broadcast on the station Bel RTL.

While on foreign tours Marka has made a number of documentary films, including Señor Marka, Si j’étais japonais and Laisse-moi chanter ta chanson.

In 2002 he sang Boby Lapointe's "Mon père et ses verres" on the album Boby Tutti-Frutti - L'hommage délicieux à Boby Lapointe by Lilicub.

In 2013 he published a book called Marka se reprend, which was accompanied by a "best of" CD and gave rise to a stage show.

== Personal life ==
His children are the singer Angèle and the rapper Romeo Elvis. His wife is the actress Laurence Bibot.

== Honours ==
In 2005 Marka was made a Knight of the Order of Leopold II (Chevalier de l'Ordre de Léopold II) by the Minister of Culture for Wallonia and Brussels, Fadila Laanan.

== Discography ==
This is not an exhaustive list.

- Je vous dis tout (1992)
- Merci d'avance (1995)
- L'Idiomatic (1997)
- L'Homme qui aimait la scène (1999)
- À nous deux, live with Laurence Bibot (2000)
- Avant après (2001)
- L'État c'est moi (2003)
- C'est tout moi (2004)
- Aktion Man (2006)
- Monsieur et Madame, with Laurence Bibot (2008)
- Marka y La Sonora Cubana (2008)
- Made in Liège (2010)
- Days of wine and roses (2015) - album
- What's Going Wrong (2015) - single
- It's only football (2016) - single

== See also ==
- Angèle – pianist, singer-songwriter and daughter of Marka
- Roméo Elvis – rapper and son of Marka

French Wikipedia articles:

- Laurence Bibot – performer and wife of Marka
- Monsieur et Madame – electro rock pop duo
- Jacques Duvall – singer and lyricist
- Thierry Robberecht – writer and lyricist
