= Charlotte Abramow =

Belgian photographer and filmmaker

- Occupation: Photographer, film director
- Website: www.charlotteabramow.com

Charlotte Abramow (born 30 September 1993 in Brussels) is a Belgian photographer and filmmaker.

== Biography ==
Charlotte Abramow was born in Brussels and made her first pictures around the age of 7. At the age of 16, she was spotted by photographer Paolo Roversi, during an internship at the 2010 Rencontres d'Arles. In 2011, Roversi wrote an article about her photos, "The fragility and soul of a warrior", published in Polka Magazine. In 2013, she joined the Gobelins School in Paris, and graduated in 2015. Her photographic work combines seriousness and absurdity.

In 2017 she started making the video for the song La Loi de Murphy and Je veux tes yeux by Angèle. In 2018, she created a video clip for International Women's Day, using the song Les Passantes by Georges Brassens, based on an idea by Christophe Coffre, president of Havas. The metaphorical depiction of vulvae and menstruation in this clip leads a YouTube ban, for under-18. This classification was later removed after protests from users.

She is working on a photographic project around her father, Maurice, who survived cancer.

== Photographic works ==
- 2014: The Real Boobs (puis dans le cadre de la Nuit de l'année aux Rencontres d'Arles 2015)
- 2015: Metamorphosis (en collaboration avec le plasticien végétal Duy Anh Nhan Duc)
- 2015: Bleu (Exhibition Magazine)
- 2016: Dear Mother
- 2017: They Love Trampoline
- 2017: Angèle (pochette d'album)
- 2017: Un spectacle drôle, spectacle de l’humoriste Marina Rollman (également direction artistique)
- création en cours: Maurice
- création en cours: First Loves (en collaboration avec Claire Laffut)
- en projet: Find Your Clitoris

== Filmography ==
- 2017: La Loi de Murphy d'Angèle
- 2018: Je veux tes yeux d'Angèle
- 2018: Les Passantes de Georges Brassens (clip pour la Journée internationale des femmes)

== Awards ==
- Weekend Photo Awards 2011: prix du public
- Prix Picto de la jeune photographie de mode 2013: finaliste
- Prix Picto de la jeune photographie de mode 2014: 1er prix
- Rencontres d'Arles 2015: finaliste des Photo Folio Review Awards
- Rencontres d'Arles 2017: mention Spéciale pour Projet Maurice aux Photo Folio Review Awards
