= Tout oublier =

2018 song by Angèle and Roméo Elvis

Single by Angèle featuring Roméo Elvis

from the album Brol
- Released: 13 October 2018
- Genre: Pop rap; R&B
- Length: 3:22
- Songwriter(s): Tristan Salvati; Roméo Van Laeken; Angèle Van Laeken
- Producer(s): Tristan Salvati; Angèle Van Laeken

Angèle singles chronology
"La thune" (2018)	"Tout oublier" (2018)	"Balance ton quoi" (2019)

Music video
- "Tout oublier" on YouTube

"Tout oublier" (French pronunciation: [tut‿ublije]) is a song by Belgian artists Angèle and Roméo Elvis. The song peaked at number one on the French Singles Chart. The song broke Stromae's record for weeks at the top of the Belgian singles charts. The song also won several Belgian and French awards.

== Awards and nominations ==
Year	Ceremony	Category	Result	Ref.
2019	Victoires de la musique	Best Audiovisual Creation	Won	
2019	NRJ Music Awards	Best French Song	Won	
2019	NRJ Music Awards	Best Collaboration	Won	
2019	D6Bels Music Awards	Song of the year	Nominated	
2019	Music Industry Awards	Song of the year	Won	

== Charts ==
=== Weekly charts ===
Weekly chart performance for "Tout oublier"
Chart (2018)	Peak position
Belgium (Ultratop 50 Flanders)	6
Belgium (Ultratop 50 Wallonia)	1
France (SNEP)	1
Switzerland (Schweizer Hitparade)	55

=== Year-end charts ===
2018 year-end chart performance for "Tout oublier"
Chart (2018)	Position
France (SNEP)	82

2019 year-end chart performance for "Tout oublier"
Chart (2019)	Position
Belgium (Ultratop Flanders)	44
Belgium (Ultratop Wallonia)	4
France (SNEP)	13

== Certifications ==
Region	Certification	Certified units/sales
Belgium (BRMA)	3× Platinum	120,000^{‡}
France (SNEP)	Diamond	333,333^{‡}
^{‡} Sales+streaming figures based on certification alone.
