= Ultratop 50 Singles (Flanders) =

Belgian singles sales chart (Flanders)

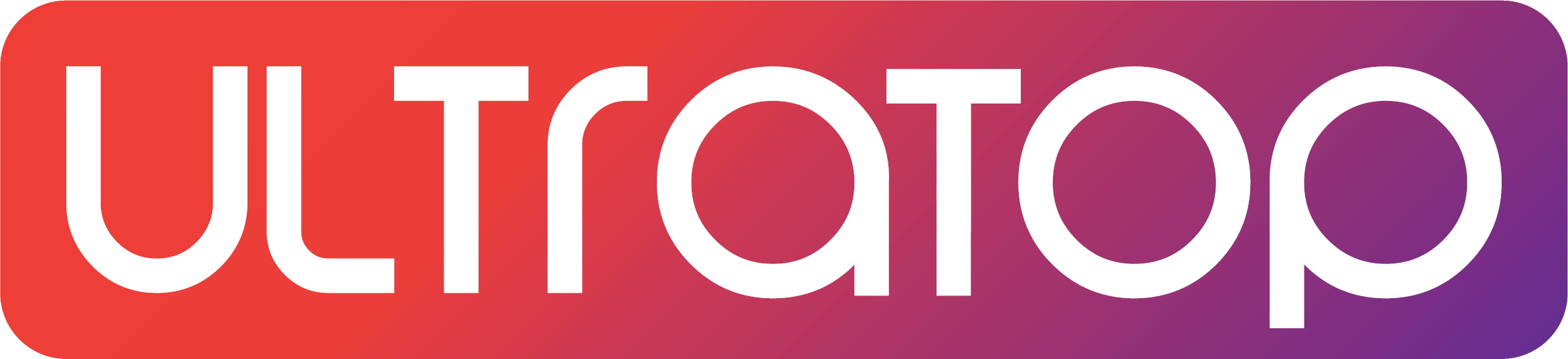
Ultratop logo since 2022

Ultratop 50 Singles is the official chart of the best-selling and most played singles in Flanders.

== History ==
The Ultratop has existed since 1954. Since March 31, 1995, the chart was drastically revised. When it was founded, only sales figures from analogue media were counted for compiling the hit list. From 2006 onwards, legal downloads were also included in the figures. Since 2016, Ultratop 50 also takes into account playback on certain streaming services, where a single playback counts for less than a purchase, and on the radio, where playback on larger stations and during busy times counts more than playback on smaller stations and during quieter times.

The hit list is currently broadcast on the public radio station MNM.

The hit list was broadcast on the public radio station Donna until the end of 2008, presented by Caren Meynen. Since Donna's discontinuation in 2009, the hit list has been broadcast on MNM. Until the end of March 2013, the list was presented by Jo Van Belle; since April 2013, it has been presented by Bert Beauprez on Sundays between 9:30 am and 1 pm. From October 13, 2013, until the summer of 2017, Ann Van Elsen took over the presentation. In 2015 and 2016, the hit list was presented alternately by Bart De Raes, Daan De Scheemaeker, Wouter Van den Breen, and Ann Van Elsen. Since September 2017, Wouter Van den Breen has been presenting it. Between 10 pm and 1 am on Sunday morning, the Ultratop 50 Replay is broadcast, in which all the songs from the hit list are played non-stop.

The list was broadcast on public radio station Studio Brussel on Saturdays under the name Hit 50. It was presented by Joren Carels. Because the programme no longer suited the station, Hit 50 was discontinued at the end of 2010.

The Walloon counterpart of this hit list is also called the Ultratop 50.

Ultratop 50 Singles
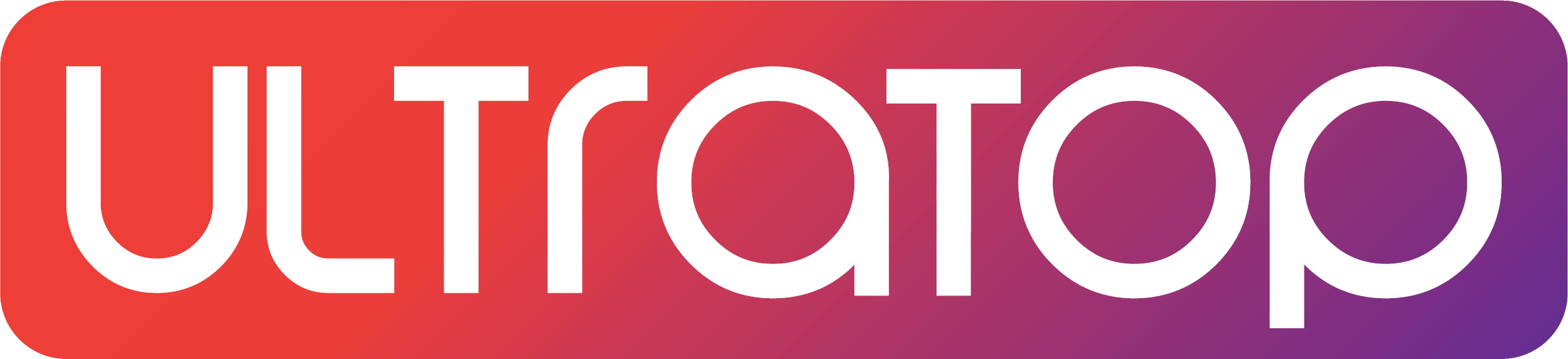
- Genre: Pop music

Original release
- Release: 1995 – 2015

From September 6, 1995, to November 26, 1997, Ultratop was broadcast on TV1. After that, the programme was shown on Ketnet from December 5, 1997, to December 31, 2000.

From January 28, 2001, the Ultratop was broadcast on TMF. The programme was presented on TMF by Caren Meynen until the end of 2008. From 2008 to 2011, Astrid Demeure presented the Ultratop on TMF, after which Lynn Pelgroms (and temporarily Sofie Engelen) took over the presentation. In October 2015, TMF was closed down and the programme disappeared from that channel.

== Records ==
=== Longest-listed at number one since 1954 ===
In 2025, Pommelien Thijs broke the record for longest-charting single by spending 18 weeks at number one, which she later improved to 21 weeks. She thus beat "Dance Monkey" by Tones and I and "Blinding Lights" by The Weeknd.

Single with hit listing(s) in the Flemish Ultratop 50	Artist	Date of publication	Date of entry	Highest position	Number of weeks	Comments
Atlas	Pommelien Thijs	2025	March 30, 2025	1 (21 weeks)	25*	
Blinding Lights	The Weeknd	2019	December 14, 2019	1 (17 weeks)	75	
Dance Monkey	Tones and I	2019	October 12, 2019	1 (17 weeks)	60	
Kvraagetaan	Fixkes	2007	February 24, 2007	1 (16 weeks)	36	
Flowers	Miley Cyrus	2023	January 19, 2023	1 (16 weeks)	35	
Shape of You	Ed Sheeran	2017	January 14, 2017	1 (15 weeks)	67	
Sweet but Psycho	Ava Max	2018	November 3, 2018	1 (15 weeks)	36	
As It Was	Harry Styles	2022	April 9, 2022	1 (14 weeks)	90	
Can't Stop the Feeling!	Justin Timberlake	2016	May 21, 2016	1 (14 weeks)	36	
Perfect	Ed Sheeran	2017	October 7, 2017	1 (14 weeks)	36	
One Kiss	Calvin Harris & Dua Lipa	2018	April 21, 2018	1 (13 weeks)	31	
The Ketchup Song	Las Ketchup	2002	August 24, 2002	1 (12 weeks)	26	
Axel F	Crazy Frog	2005	May 21, 2005	1 (12 weeks)	21	
Somebody That I Used to Know	Gotye feat. Kimbra	2011	August 20, 2011	1 (12 weeks)	61	
Despacito	Luis Fonsi & Daddy Yankee	2017	February 18, 2017	1 (12 weeks)	37	
(Everything I Do) I Do It for You	Bryan Adams	1991	July 20, 1991	1 (11 weeks)	20	in the BRT Top 30
This Is the Life	Amy Macdonald	2008	June 7, 2008	1 (11 weeks)	37	
Hello	Adele	2015	October 30, 2015	1 (11 weeks)	24	
Old Town Road	Lil Nas X	2019	May 4, 2019	1 (11 weeks)	36	
Con te partirò	Andrea Bocelli	1996	February 17, 1996	1 (10 weeks)	22	
Barbie Girl	Aqua	1997	September 20, 1997	1 (10 weeks)	28	
Last Thing on My Mind	Steps	1998	May 9, 1998	1 (10 weeks)	26	
Wild Dances	Ruslana	2004	May 29, 2004	1 (10 weeks)	20	
Take Me to Church	Hozier	2013	August 16, 2014	1 (10 weeks)	36	
7 Years	Lukas Graham	2015	January 2, 2016	1 (10 weeks)	26	
Hoe het danst	Marco Borsato, Armin van Buuren, Davina Michelle	2019	June 1, 2019	1 (10 weeks)	43	

=== Longest-charting singles since 1954 ===
- As It Was by Harry Styles spent 90 weeks on the chart, making it the longest-listed single ever in the Ultratop 50.
- Blinding Lights by The Weeknd is the second longest-charting single of all time with 75 weeks on the charts.
- I Gotta Feeling by The Black Eyed Peas was listed for 69 weeks (of which 62 weeks consecutive) in the Ultratop 50 and is therefore in 3rd place.

Single with hit listing(s) in the Flemish Ultratop 50	Artist	Date of publication	Date of entry	Highest position	Number of weeks	Comments
As It Was	Harry Styles	2022	April 9, 2022	1 (14 weeks)	90	
Blinding Lights	The Weeknd	2019	December 14, 2019	1 (17 weeks)	75	
I Gotta Feeling	Black Eyed Peas	2009	July 18, 2009	1 (8 weeks)	69	
Shape of You	Ed Sheeran	2017	January 14, 2017	1 (15 weeks)	67	
Beautiful Things	Benson Boone	2024	February 3, 2024	1 (1 week)	67	
Rolling in the Deep	Adele	2010	January 29, 2011	1 (4 weeks)	62	
Somebody That I Used to Know	Gotye feat. Kimbra	2011	August 20, 2011	1 (12 weeks)	61	
Dance Monkey	Tones and I	2019	October 12, 2019	1 (17 weeks)	60	
Happy	Pharrell Williams	2013	November 30, 2013	1 (8 weeks)	60	
Birds of a Feather	Billie Eilish	2024	May 25, 2024	7	58	
Lose Control	Teddy Swims	2023	September 23, 2023	1	56	
Someone You Loved	Lewis Capaldi	2019	January 19, 2019	2	55	
Rock Around the Clock	Bill Haley & His Comets	1954	November 1, 1955	2	54	
Sex on Fire	Kings of Leon	2008	September 20, 2008	9	54	
Messy	Lola Young	2024	December 21, 2024	1 (6 weeks)	52*	
All of Me	John Legend	2013	December 7, 2013	3	52	
Cold Heart	Elton John & Dua Lipa	2021	September 4, 2021	2	51	
Gold	Bazart	2015	February 20, 2016	12	50	
Die with a Smile	Lady Gaga & Bruno Mars	2024	August 24, 2024	1 (2 weeks)	49	
Move	Adam Port and Stryv featuring Malachiii	2024	July 6, 2024	1 (1 week)	48	
I Follow Rivers	Lykke Li	2011	September 3, 2011	1 (4 weeks)	47	
Wake Me Up	Avicii	2013	June 29, 2013	1 (5 weeks)	47	
Rood	Marco Borsato	2006	May 13, 2006	1 (9 weeks)	46	
Set Fire to the Rain	Adele	2011	April 16, 2011	1 (2 weeks)	46	
Papaoutai	Stromae	2013	May 25, 2013	3	46	
Someone Like You	Adele	2011	April 16, 2011	2	45	
That's So True	Gracie Abrams	2024	November 9, 2024	1 (8 weeks)	44	
Zambesi	Eddie Calvert	1956	July 1, 1956	2	44	
The Carousel Waltz	Ray Martin	1956	December 1, 1956	3	44	
I Follow Rivers	Triggerfinger	2012	March 3, 2012	1 (7 weeks)	44	
Bad Guy	Billie Eilish	2019	April 6, 2019	3	44	
Erop of eronder	Pommelien Thijs	2023	June 17, 2023	1 (6 weeks)	44	
Ordinary	Alex Warren	2025	February 22, 2025	1 (3 weeks)	43*	
Can't Stop the Feeling!	Justin Timberlake	2016	May 21, 2016	1 (14 weeks)	43	
Let's Twist Again	Chubby Checker	1961	November 1, 1961	1 (4 weeks)	42	
You Don't Know	Milow	2007	March 3, 2007	3	42	
Alors on danse	Stromae	2010	April 17, 2010	1 (4 weeks)	42	
Buona Sera	Louis Prima	1950	November 1, 1957	1 (5 weeks)	40	
Kiss kiss polka	Willy Lustenhouwer	1958	June 1, 1958	4	40	
Till	Roger Williams	1957	April 1, 1958	3	40	
A Pub with No Beer	Bobbejaan Schoepen	1959	April 1, 1959	3	40	
Marina	Rocco Granata	1959	July 1, 1959	1 (5 weeks)	40	
A hut on the heath	Bobbejaan Schoepen	1960	January 1, 1960	1 (1 week)	40	
Party Rock Anthem	LMFAO feat. Lauren Bennett & GoonRock	2010	April 23, 2011	1 (1 week)	40	
Skinny love	Birdy	2011	September 24, 2011	3	40	
Formidable	Stromae	2013	June 15, 2013	1 (1 week)	40	
Are you with me	Lost Frequencies	2014	November 15, 2014	1 (5 weeks)	40	
Uptown Funk	Mark Ronson feat. Bruno Mars	2014	November 29, 2014	1 (3 weeks)	40	

== Other records ==
- We Are the World 25 for Haiti by Artists For Haiti was the shortest-lived number one hit, staying at number one for six weeks. The song spent one week at number one.
- From not charting straight to number 1 came in: For You (Peter Evrard), 1 life (Xandee), Ya 'Bout To Find Out (Joeri Fransen), Geef een teken (Artiesten voor Tsunami 12-12), El mundo bailando (Belle Pérez), Home (Tom Helsen feat. Geike Arnaert), Mijn leven (Andy Sierens AKA Vijvenveertig feat. Hooverphonic), Papillon (The Editors), Hallelujah (Natalia feat. Gabriel Ríos), On the Floor (Jennifer Lopez feat. Pitbull), More to Me (Idool 2011 Finalisten), Zanna (Selah Sue feat. Tom Barman & The Subs), Get Lucky (Daft Punk feat. Pharrell Williams), Dat ik je mis (Maaike Ouboter), Vliegtuig (Clouseau), Running Low (Netsky feat. Beth Ditto), Do They Know It's Christmas? (Band Aid 30), Goeiemorgend, goeiendag (Stan Van Samang), Een ster (Stan Van Samang), See You Again (Wiz Khalifa feat. Charlie Puth), Rhythm Inside (Loïc Nottet), Hello (Adele), 10.000 luchtballonnen (K3), Perfect (Ed Sheeran), De wereld draait voor jou (Niels Destadsbader & Regi), Houdini (Dua Lipa) and Atlas (Pommelien Thijs).
- The biggest climber to number 1 was the Elton John song Candle in the Wind 1997, which climbed from 46 to 1.
- Dear Mr. President by Pink was the first download-only single to reach number one.
- Milk Inc. has already had 27 singles reach the top 10, which is a record.
- Stan Van Samang holds the record for the most songs simultaneously in the Ultratop 50. On May 9, 2015, he had six songs in the chart, including the top two spots, which is also unique. In fact, he was in the chart seven times, thanks to his vocals on the song Iedereen is van de wereld by Thé & Vrienden.

== Filling in the media ==
- MNM airs the full chart on Sundays between 9:00 am and 12:00 pm. The previous week's top 3, songs that have dropped out of the top 50, and new entries are mentioned. The highest newcomer and strongest climber usually receive a special mention. Occasionally, the presenter will also announce a song's longest-listed or biggest fall. The Ultratop 50 is repeated non-stop on Sunday evenings between 9:00 pm and midnight under the name Ultratop 50 Replay .
- StuBru aired the Hit 50 , presented last by Joren Carels. Only about thirty of the 50 Ultratop songs were played. Around 11:30 am, there was a call-in game with a list of five songs. The first caller who could find the song that wasn't on the list received five Ultratop hit albums. At the end of 2010, the Hit 50 was removed from the broadcast schedule because the program no longer fit the station's profile. In this time slot, you can now hear De Afrekening with An Lemmens.
- The list was broadcast twice a week on TMF, on Sundays and Wednesdays (the repeat) by Lynn Pelgroms between 2 and 5 pm. The program searched for an artist from the Ultratop charts. Based on a few tips, the answer could be sent or emailed. In November 2015, the program and the channel were discontinued.

== Annual review ==
- 1995: Guus Meeuwis & Vagant – Het is een nacht... (Levensecht)
- 1996: Andrea Bocelli – Con te partirò
- 1997: Elton John – Something About the Way You Look Tonight / Candle in the Wind 1997
- 1998: Céline Dion – My Heart Will Go On
- 1999: Britney Spears – ...Baby One More Time
- 2000: Krezip – I Would Stay
- 2001: Geri Halliwell – It's Raining Men
- 2002: Las Ketchup – The Ketchup Song
- 2003: The Underdog Project feat. The Sunclub – Summer jam 2003
- 2004: Xandee – 1 Life
- 2005: Artiesten voor Tsunami 12-12 – Geef een teken
- 2006: Marco Borsato – Rood
- 2007: Fixkes – Kvraagetaan
- 2008: Amy Macdonald – This Is the Life
- 2009: Lady Gaga – Poker Face
- 2010: Stromae – Alors on danse
- 2011: Gotye feat. Kimbra – Somebody That I Used to Know
- 2012: Michel Teló – Ai se eu te pego!
- 2013: Avicii – Wake Me Up
- 2014: Pharrell Williams – Happy
- 2015: Bruno Mars feat. Mark Ronson – Uptown Funk
- 2016: Justin Timberlake – Can't Stop the Feeling!
- 2017: Ed Sheeran – Shape of You
- 2018: Calvin Harris en Dua Lipa – One Kiss
- 2019: Lewis Capaldi – Someone You Loved
- 2020: The Weeknd – Blinding Lights
- 2021: The Weeknd – Save Your Tears
- 2022: Harry Styles – As It Was
- 2023: Miley Cyrus – Flowers
- 2024: Benson Boone – Beautiful Things
