= Werchter Boutique =

Music festival in Werchter, Belgium

Coordinates: 50°58′5″N 4°41′3″E

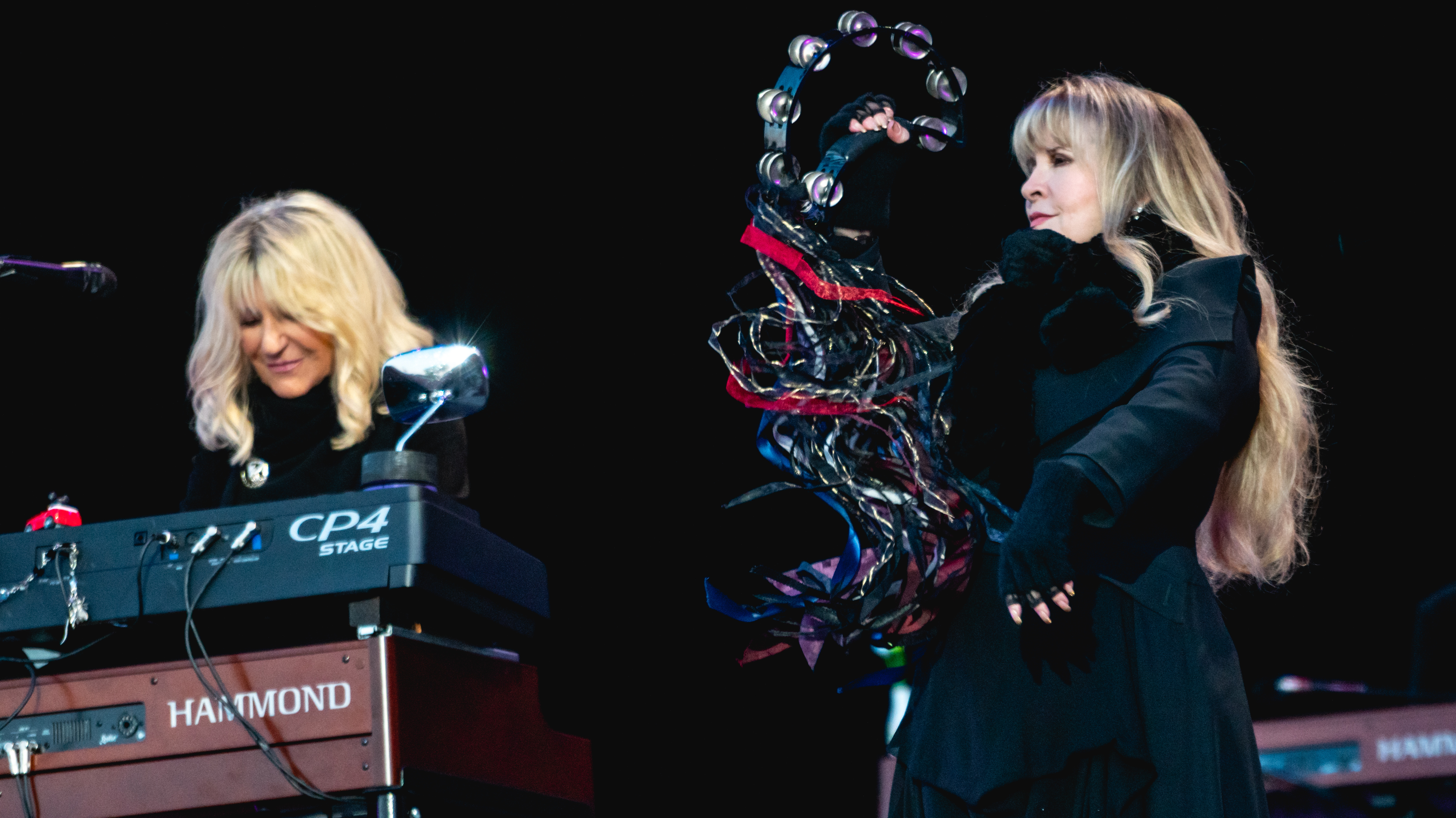
- Fleetwood Mac during the 2019 edition
- Genre: Alternative rock, rock, indie rock, pop, hip hop, heavy metal, electronic music, dance music
- Locations: Werchter Festivalpark, Werchter, Belgium
- Years active: 2008–present
- Capacity: 60.000
- Organiser: Live Nation
- Website: Festival Website

Werchter Boutique is a Belgian music festival. It is a one-day event, usually organized prior to the Rock Werchter festival.

The first edition took place in 2008. Until 2011, the organizers mainly focused on families. However, the 2012 edition was focused at metal enthusiasts.

Unlike the other satellite festival of Rock Werchter, TW Classic, this festival does not take place every year.

== List of lineups ==
=== 2008 ===
Doe Maar, Santana, James Blunt, Crowded House, Hucknall, Tokio Hotel, Zornik, Milow

=== 2009 ===
Madonna, Paul Oakenfold

=== 2010 ===
Prince, Larry Graham, Mint Condition, Jamie Lidell

=== 2011 ===
No edition

=== 2012 ===
Metallica, Soundgarden, Mastodon, Channel Zero, Gojira, Ghost

=== 2013 ===
Muse, Balthazar, SX

=== 2014-2015-2016 ===
No editions

=== 2017 ===
Robbie Williams, Tourist LeMC, Marco Borsato, Erasure, Stan Van Samang, Niels Destadsbader

=== 2018 ===
Bruno Mars, Oscar and the Wolf, Years & Years, Jessie J, Tom Odell, DJ Rashida, Lil' Kleine

=== 2019 ===
Fleetwood Mac, Snow Patrol, Triggerfinger, The Pretenders, Arsenal, Novastar

=== 2020 ===
Taylor Swift, 5 Seconds of Summer, Ellie Goulding, Bazart, Loïc Nottet, Zwangere Guy, Brihang
Event canceled due to the COVID-19 pandemic.

=== 2021 ===
No edition due to COVID-19 pandemic.

=== 2022 ===
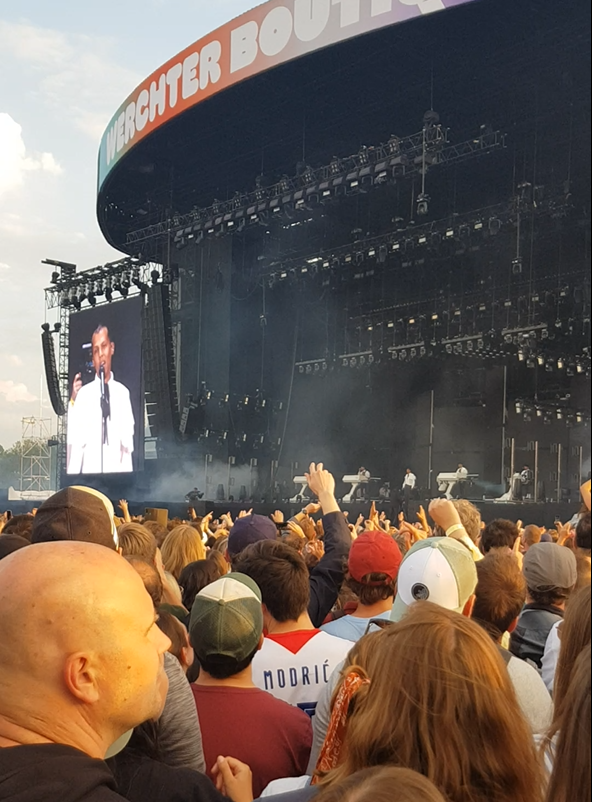
Stromae at Werchter Boutique 2022

Gorillaz, Stromae, Years & Years, Khruangbin, Arsenal, Blackwave

=== 2023 ===
P!nk, OneRepublic, Ellie Goulding, Goldband, Selah Sue, S10

=== 2024 ===
No edition because no suitable date was found with the possible headliners

=== 2025 ===
Imagine Dragons, Jorja Smith, Bazart, Declan McKenna, Meau, Emma Bale

=== 2026 ===
~~Katy Perry,~~ Pitbull, Mika, Pommelien Thijs, James Arthur, Roxy Dekker, Emmy d'Arc
Due to an approaching storm, the festival area was evacuated after Pitbull's performance. Katy Perry's performance was canceled.

=== 2027 ===
Raye
