= List of Dutch Top 40 number-one singles of 2021 =

This is a list of the Dutch Top 40 number-one singles of 2021. The Dutch Top 40 is a chart that ranks the best-performing singles of the Netherlands. It is published every week by radio station Qmusic.

== Chart history ==
Issue date	Song	Artist(s)	Ref.
January 2	"The Business"	Tiësto	
January 9	"The Business"	Tiësto	
January 16	"Nu wij niet meer praten"	Jaap Reesema and Pommelien Thijs	
January 23	"Drivers License"	Olivia Rodrigo	
January 30	"Drivers License"	Olivia Rodrigo	
February 6	"Drivers License"	Olivia Rodrigo	
February 13	"Drivers License"	Olivia Rodrigo	
February 20	"Drivers License"	Olivia Rodrigo	
February 27	"Wellerman" (220 Kid x Billen Ted remix)	Nathan Evans	
March 6	"Wellerman" (220 Kid x Billen Ted remix)	Nathan Evans	
March 13	"Wellerman" (220 Kid x Billen Ted remix)	Nathan Evans	
March 20	"Wellerman" (220 Kid x Billen Ted remix)	Nathan Evans	
March 27	"Blijven slapen"	Snelle and Maan	
April 3	"Blijven slapen"	Snelle and Maan	
April 10	"Blijven slapen"	Snelle and Maan	
April 17	"Blijven slapen"	Snelle and Maan	
April 24	"Blijven slapen"	Snelle and Maan	
May 1	"Blijven slapen"	Snelle and Maan	
May 8	"Blijven slapen"	Snelle and Maan	
May 15	"Blijven slapen"	Snelle and Maan	
May 22	"Blijven slapen"	Snelle and Maan	
May 29	"Blijven slapen"	Snelle and Maan	
June 5	"Good 4 U"	Olivia Rodrigo	
June 12	"Good 4 U"	Olivia Rodrigo	
June 19	"Good 4 U"	Olivia Rodrigo	
June 26	"Good 4 U"	Olivia Rodrigo	
July 3	"Good 4 U"	Olivia Rodrigo	
July 10	"Good 4 U"	Olivia Rodrigo	
July 17	"Bad Habits"	Ed Sheeran	
July 24	"Bad Habits"	Ed Sheeran	
July 31	"Bad Habits"	Ed Sheeran	
August 7	"Bad Habits"	Ed Sheeran	
August 14	"Bad Habits"	Ed Sheeran	
August 21	"Stay"	The Kid Laroi and Justin Bieber	
August 28	"Ik ga zwemmen"	Mart Hoogkamer	
September 4	"Ik ga zwemmen"	Mart Hoogkamer	
September 11	"Stay"	The Kid Laroi and Justin Bieber	
September 18	"Stay"	The Kid Laroi and Justin Bieber	
September 25	"Stay"	The Kid Laroi and Justin Bieber	
October 2	"Stay"	The Kid Laroi and Justin Bieber	
October 9	"Stay"	The Kid Laroi and Justin Bieber	
October 16	"Stay"	The Kid Laroi and Justin Bieber	
October 23	"Easy on Me"	Adele	
October 30	"Easy on Me"	Adele	
November 6	"Easy on Me"	Adele	
November 13	"Easy on Me"	Adele	
November 20	"Easy on Me"	Adele	
November 27	"Easy on Me"	Adele	
December 4	"Easy on Me"	Adele	
December 11	"Easy on Me"	Adele	
December 18	"Easy on Me"	Adele	
December 25	"Merry Christmas"	Ed Sheeran and Elton John	

== Number-one artists ==
Position	Artist	Weeks #1
1	Olivia Rodrigo	11
2	Snelle	10
2	Maan	10
3	Adele	9
4	Justin Bieber	7
4	The Kid Laroi	7
5	Ed Sheeran	6
6	Nathan Evans	4
6	220 Kid	4
6	Billen Ted	4
7	Tiësto	2
7	Mart Hoogkamer	2
8	Jaap Reesema	1
8	Pommelien Thijs	1
8	Elton John	1

== See also ==
- 2021 in music
