= Belgium's Got Talent (TV program) =

- Genre: Entertainment, Talent show
- Presented by: Julie Taton; Jean-Michel Zecca
- Country of origin: Belgium
- Original language: French
- No. of seasons: 2

Production
- Running time: 110 minutes
- Production company: FremantleMedia

Original release
- Network: RTL-TVI
- Release: September 10, 2012 – December 1, 2013

Belgium's Got Talent (French: La Belgique a du Talent) is a Belgian TV show produced by FremantleMedia and broadcast by RTL-TVI since September 10, 2012. It is hosted by Julie Taton and Jean-Michel Zecca. It is a local adaptation (in French-speaking Belgium) of the British talent show Britain's Got Talent, created by Simon Cowell.

A TV show by the same name, hosted by Koen Wauters and Laura Tesoro, is broadcast on a Dutch-speaking channel in Belgium VTM. At its height, the judges were Dan Karaty, An Lemmens, Stan Van Samang and Niels Destadsbader.

Then, in 2021, popular American and Dutch TV personality Dan Karaty was replaced on the judging panel, without explanation, by VTM's head of programming, Davy Parmentier. As a result, the once top-rated show fell dramatically in the ratings. "Belgium's Got Talent" has not aired since then.

== The judges ==
Maureen Dor, Carlos Vaquera and Paul Ambach are the judges for the first season of this show. In 2021, popular viewer favorite Dan Karaty was replaced by Davy Parmentier.

== Concept ==
The first season is composed of ten episodes. After a round of auditions and multiple semi-finals, a final is hosted at the end of which the winner receives the prize of €50,000.

=== Auditions ===
During the first five episodes amateurs, artists, professionals and so on audition in front of the cameras, each performing their incredible talent in front of the three judges. They have to captivate the judges for two minutes. At any time, a judge can press his buzzer, in case errors in the performance are spotted (and effectively making a red cross appear above the stage). If all three judges have pressed their buzzer, the candidate is forced to stop his act and is immediately eliminated. If, however, after two minutes, the candidate hasn't received three crosses, the judges deliberate and each member gives a positive or negative vote: at least two positive votes are required to continue to the semi-finals. During this stage a judge may alter his vote (giving a negative vote even though he or she hasn't buzzed).

=== Semi-final ===
After the auditions, the candidates having received two or three positive votes from the judges are qualified for the semi-finals. In this stage, candidates are split up into different groups. From here on, the vote of the spectators is introduced in the show and is effectively used to indicate which candidates may continue to the final. After each semi-final, the votes are tallied in order to form a top three. The first place candidate of the episode is granted immediate access to the finals. The judges choose between second and third place which candidate shall continue to the finals. All other contestants are eliminated.

Season	Candidate	talent
Season 1	Cléry Khedhir Fabian Giordano et Gangitano Can I 2 Mad Speeders Family Milla Vitali Stefan Gillis Ugo Farell	Dance & piano Latin dance Dance Dance Yamakasi Song and guitar Song and guitar Song

=== Final ===
During the final, the spectators are the only ones who can judge the performance of the candidates and thus elect that season's incredible talent. The candidate with the most votes receives €50,000 in prize money.

== Viewers ==
Season	Aired	Viewers		
Season	Aired	Premier	Final	Average
1	September 10, 2012 - November 5, 2012	502,900 (30,1 %)	743,500 (37,9 %)	644,645 (35,6 %)
2	July 11, 2013 - December 1, 2013	405,600 (23,8 %)	493,400 (26,5 %)	468,973 (25,8 %)

== See also ==
- Got Talent
