= List of Ultratop 50 number-one singles of 2021 =

These hits topped the Ultratop 50 in 2021.

Flanders
Issue date	Song	Artist
2 January	"Nu wij niet meer praten"	Jaap Reesema and Pommelien Thijs
9 January	"Fever"	Dua Lipa and Angèle
16 January	"Fever"	Dua Lipa and Angèle
23 January	"Drivers License"	Olivia Rodrigo
30 January	"Drivers License"	Olivia Rodrigo
6 February	"Drivers License"	Olivia Rodrigo
13 February	"Drivers License"	Olivia Rodrigo
20 February	"Drivers License"	Olivia Rodrigo
27 February	"Drivers License"	Olivia Rodrigo
6 March	"Save Your Tears"	The Weeknd
13 March	"Wellerman"	Nathan Evans
20 March	"Without You"	The Kid Laroi
27 March	"Wellerman"	Nathan Evans
3 April	"Wellerman"	Nathan Evans
10 April	"Friday"	Riton and Nightcrawlers featuring Mufasa & Hypeman
17 April	"Wellerman"	Nathan Evans
24 April	"1 op een miljoen"	Metejoor featuring Babet
1 May	"Friday"	Riton and Nightcrawlers featuring Mufasa & Hypeman
8 May	"De wereld draait voor jou"	Niels Destadsbader and Regi
15 May	"De wereld draait voor jou"	Niels Destadsbader and Regi
22 May	"Higher Power"	Coldplay
29 May	"The Wrong Place"	Hooverphonic
5 June	"Good 4 U"	Olivia Rodrigo
12 June	"Good 4 U"	Olivia Rodrigo
19 June	"Good 4 U"	Olivia Rodrigo
26 June	"Good 4 U"	Olivia Rodrigo
3 July	"Good 4 U"	Olivia Rodrigo
10 July	"Bad Habits"	Ed Sheeran
17 July	"Bad Habits"	Ed Sheeran
24 July	"Bad Habits"	Ed Sheeran
31 July	"Bad Habits"	Ed Sheeran
7 August	"Bad Habits"	Ed Sheeran
14 August	"Bad Habits"	Ed Sheeran
21 August	"Bad Habits"	Ed Sheeran
28 August	"Love Tonight"	Shouse
4 September	"Love Tonight"	Shouse
11 September	"Love Tonight"	Shouse
18 September	"Love Tonight"	Shouse
25 September	"Love Tonight"	Shouse
2 October	"Love Tonight"	Shouse
9 October	"Stay"	The Kid Laroi and Justin Bieber
16 October	"Stay"	The Kid Laroi and Justin Bieber
23 October	"Easy on Me"	Adele
30 October	"Easy on Me"	Adele
6 November	"Easy on Me"	Adele
13 November	"Easy on Me"	Adele
20 November	"Easy on Me"	Adele
27 November	"Easy on Me"	Adele
4 December	"Easy on Me"	Adele
11 December	"Easy on Me"	Adele
18 December	"Easy on Me"	Adele
25 December	"Waterval"	K3

Wallonia
Issue date	Song	Artist
2 January	"Fever"	Dua Lipa and Angèle
9 January	"Fever"	Dua Lipa and Angèle
16 January	"Fever"	Dua Lipa and Angèle
23 January	"Fever"	Dua Lipa and Angèle
30 January	"Fever"	Dua Lipa and Angèle
6 February	"Fever"	Dua Lipa and Angèle
13 February	"Fever"	Dua Lipa and Angèle
20 February	"Fever"	Dua Lipa and Angèle
27 February	"Fever"	Dua Lipa and Angèle
6 March	"Save Your Tears"	The Weeknd
13 March	"Fever"	Dua Lipa and Angèle
20 March	"Save Your Tears"	The Weeknd
27 March	"Save Your Tears"	The Weeknd
3 April	"Save Your Tears"	The Weeknd
10 April	"Save Your Tears"	The Weeknd
17 April	"Save Your Tears"	The Weeknd
24 April	"Save Your Tears"	The Weeknd
1 May	"Save Your Tears"	The Weeknd
8 May	"Morose"	Damso
15 May	"Save Your Tears"	The Weeknd
22 May	"Save Your Tears"	The Weeknd
29 May	"Save Your Tears"	The Weeknd
5 June	"Save Your Tears"	The Weeknd
12 June	"Cover Me in Sunshine"	Pink and Willow Sage Hart
19 June	"Petrouchka"	Soso Maness featuring PLK
26 June	"Petrouchka"	Soso Maness featuring PLK
3 July	"Cover Me in Sunshine"	Pink and Willow Sage Hart
10 July	"Cover Me in Sunshine"	Pink and Willow Sage Hart
17 July	"Cover Me in Sunshine"	Pink and Willow Sage Hart
24 July	"Cover Me in Sunshine"	Pink and Willow Sage Hart
31 July	"Never Going Home"	Kungs
7 August	"Bad Habits"	Ed Sheeran
14 August	"Bad Habits"	Ed Sheeran
21 August	"Bad Habits"	Ed Sheeran
28 August	"Bad Habits"	Ed Sheeran
4 September	"Bad Habits"	Ed Sheeran
11 September	"Bad Habits"	Ed Sheeran
18 September	"Bad Habits"	Ed Sheeran
25 September	"Bad Habits"	Ed Sheeran
2 October	"Stay"	The Kid Laroi and Justin Bieber
9 October	"Bad Habits"	Ed Sheeran
16 October	"Stay"	The Kid Laroi and Justin Bieber
23 October	"Santé"	Stromae
30 October	"Bruxelles je t'aime"	Angèle
6 November	"Cold Heart (Pnau remix)"	Elton John and Dua Lipa
13 November	"Bruxelles je t'aime"	Angèle
20 November	"Cold Heart (Pnau remix)"	Elton John and Dua Lipa
27 November	"Easy on Me"	Adele
4 December	"Easy on Me"	Adele
11 December	"Bruxelles je t'aime"	Angèle
18 December	"Bruxelles je t'aime"	Angèle
25 December	"Bruxelles je t'aime"	Angèle

Flanders ranking of most weeks at number 1
Position	Artist	Weeks #1
1	Olivia Rodrigo	11
2	Adele	9
3	Ed Sheeran	7
4	Shouse	6
5	Nathan Evans	4
6	The Kid Laroi	3
7	Dua Lipa	2
7	Angèle	2
7	Riton	2
7	Nightcrawlers	2
7	Mufasa & Hypeman	2
7	Niels Destadsbader	2
7	Regi	2
7	Justin Bieber	2
8	Jaap Reesema	1
8	Pommelien Thijs	1
8	The Weeknd	1
8	Metejoor	1
8	Babet	1
8	Coldplay	1
8	Hooverphonic	1
8	K3	1

Wallonia ranking of most weeks at number 1
Position	Artist	Weeks #1
1	Angèle	15
2	The Weeknd	12
2	Dua Lipa	12
3	Ed Sheeran	9
4	Pink	5
4	Willow Sage Hart	5
5	Soso Maness	2
5	PLK	2
5	The Kid Laroi	2
5	Justin Bieber	2
5	Elton John	2
5	Adele	2
6	Damso	1
6	Kungs	1
6	Stromae	1

== See also ==
- List of number-one albums of 2021 (Belgium)
- 2021 in music
