= Music Industry Awards =

Belgian music industry award

- Awarded for: Outstanding achievements in Flemish music industry
- Location: Palais 12 (2017-2022); Sportpaleis (2023-2024); ING Arena (2025)
- Country: Belgium
- Presented by: Music Centre Flanders
- First award: 1994 (as ZAMU Award); 2007 (as MIA)
- Website: mias.een.be

Television/radio coverage
- Network: VRT

The MIA's, in full Music Industry Awards, are Flemish music prizes that are awarded by the VRT in collaboration with Music Centre Flanders. The prizes replace the ZAMU Awards, last awarded in 2006.

The abbreviation MIA is a wink to Mia, a song by Gorki.

== History ==
The first MIA's were the 2007 MIA's, the winners of which were revealed on 30 January 2008; the show was broadcast by Eén two days later. There were twelve categories of award, nine of which were voted for by the public, the other three by the music industry itself. In 2007 the singer Milow from Leuven was the biggest winner, scooping three prizes.

At the second edition, on 6 February 2009, Milow was again the biggest winner. This time he took home five prizes, including those for best song and best male solo artist.

The third show (MIA's 2009) took place on 8 January 2010. Absynthe Minded and Daan (Stuyven) were the biggest winners. Absynthe Minded won the MIA's for Hit of the Year, best album, best rock/alternative and best band. Daan won the prizes for best male solo artist, best author/composer, best videoclip and best artwork.

In early December 2010 the VRT announced the nominees for the 2010 MIA's. The most nominated artists, with four or more nominations, were Stromae, Tom Dice, Bart Peeters and Admiral Freebee. The award ceremony was broadcast live on Eén on 7 January 2011. Stromae won the most important MIA, "Hit van het Jaar", as well as "Best Breakthrough". There was no clear-cut winner of the event. The most successful artists, all with two awards, were Stromae, The Black Box Revelation, Goose and Triggerfinger. Only at the 2010 show a MIA for "Kidspop" was awarded, with Kapitein Winokio as winner.

The 2011 Music Industry Awards ceremony took place on 10 December 2011. Milow and Selah Sue each took home three MIA's, and Gotye and dEUS two each.

The 2012 MIA's show took place on 8 December 2012. Also in this sixth edition the prizes were awarded during a live broadcast on Eén, this time presented by Peter Van de Veire and Cath Luyten. The biggest winner of 2012 was Triggerfinger. This band around Ruben Block won the awards in all four of the categories for which it was nominated. Triggerfinger won the most important MIA, the "Hit of the year", with the cover I follow rivers. They also won the awards for best group, best alternative music and best live-act. The prize for best album went to Balthazar for the album Rats.

== Voting procedure ==
Before the yearly show, the nominees are assigned by a broad media jury. (Music) journalists from both popular and specialized magazines, newspapers, radio and television participate at a preceding voting procedure in which each journalist kan indicate his/her favourite candidates per category. For each category the four candidates with the highest number of annotations receive a definitive nomination. After the publication of the nominees, the broad public can bring out their votes for the majority of the categories. The winners of a limited number of categories are elected by professionals from the Flemish music sector. The Lifetime Achievement Award is chosen by the organizers of the MIA's.

== Recent winners ==
A list of recent winners showing the most recent editions, with the most important categories:

Year	Venue	Song of the Year	Album of the Year	Breakthrough act	Solo artist of the Year
2014	AED Studios, Lint	"Gold" - Gabriel Ríos	Entity - Oscar and the Wolf	Oscar and the Wolf	Stromae; Selah Sue
2015	AED Studios, Lint	"Een ster" - Stan Van Samang	Thin Walls - Balthazar	Tourist LeMC	Stromae; Selah Sue
2016	ING Arena, Brussels	"Goud" - Bazart	Calais - Het Zesde Metaal	Bazart	Stan Van Samang; Emma Bale
2017	ING Arena, Brussels	"City Lights" - Blanche	From Deewee - Soulwax	Blanche	Coely; Oscar and the Wolf
2018	ING Arena, Brussels	"Zoutelande" - BLØF & Geike Arnaert	Dertig - Niels Destadsbader	Angèle	Angèle; Niels Destadsbader
2019	ING Arena, Brussels	"Tout oublier" - Angèle & Roméo Elvis	Alive and Feeling Fine - Lost Frequencies	IBE	Angèle; Niels Destadsbader
2021	ING Arena, Brussels	"Fever" - Dua Lipa & Angèle	De kat zat op de krant - Bart Peeters	Metejoor	Angèle; Metejoor
2022	ING Arena, Brussels	"Ongewoon" - Pommelien Thijs	Metejoor - Metejoor	Pommelien Thijs	Pommelien Thijs; Metejoor
2023	Sportpaleis, Antwerp	"Erop of eronder" - Pommelien Thijs	Per Ongeluk - Pommelien Thijs	Aaron Blommaert	Pommelien Thijs
2024	Sportpaleis, Antwerp	"Het beste moet nog komen" - Pommelien Thijs	I'll Call You When I'm Home - Berre	Maksim	Pommelien Thijs
2025	ING Arena, Brussels	"Atlas" - Pommelien Thijs	Gedoe - Pommelien Thijs	Red Sebastian	Pommelien Thijs

== Most successful acts ==
There have been numerous acts, both groups and individuals, that have won multiple awards. The table below shows those that have won seven or more awards.

Number of awards	Belgian acts	Notes
20	Stromae	4x Best Music Video; 3x Best Male Artist; 2x Best Componist; 2x Song of the year 2x Best Pop; Best Album; Best Dance; Best Artwork; Best New Artist; Best Live Act
17	Pommelien Thijs	4x Song of the Year; 3x Best Solo Artist; 3x Best Dutch (language) Act; 3x Best Pop; 2x Best Album; Best Female Artist; Best New Artist
12	Milow	3x Best Pop; 2x Song of the year 2x Best Male Artist; 2x Best Video; Best New Artist; Best Live Act
12	Angèle	3x Best Female Artist; 2x Best Pop; 2x Song of the year 2x Best Music Video; Best New Artist; Best Live Act; Best Artwork
11	Bazart	6x Best Group; 2x Best Dutch (language) Act; Song of the Year; Best Pop; Best New Artist
9	Niels Destadsbader	3x Best Popular Artist; 2x Best Dutch (language) artist 2x Best Male Artist; Best Album; Best Pop
9	Balthazar	3x Best Album; 3x Best Alternative; 2x Best Live-act; Best Group
8	Oscar and the Wolf	2x Best Live Act; 2x Best Pop; Best Male Artist; Best Alternative; Best Album; Best New Artist
8	Clouseau	5x Best Group; Best Live Act; Best Dutch (language) Act
7	Selah Sue	5x Best Female Artist; Best Album; Best Artist (based on sales)
6	DAAN	2x Best Male Artist; Best Music video Best Author/Componist; Best Alternative; Best Artwork
6	Lost Frequencies	5x Best Dance; Best Album
