= List of number-one albums of 2021 (Belgium) =

The Belgian Albums Chart, divided into the two main regions Flanders and Wallonia, ranks the best-performing albums in Belgium, as compiled by Ultratop.

== Flanders ==
List of number-one albums of 2021 in Flanders
Issue date	Album	Artist	Reference
2 January	Thuis	André Hazes Jr.	
9 January	Fine Line	Harry Styles	
16 January	Fine Line	Harry Styles	
23 January	Evermore	Taylor Swift	
30 January	130 Kilo	Dikke	
6 February	Not Your Muse	Celeste	
13 February	Medicine at Midnight	Foo Fighters	
20 February	Feel the Power	Stan Van Samang	
27 February	Feel the Power	Stan Van Samang	
6 March	Sand	Balthazar	
13 March	Sand	Balthazar	
20 March	Sand	Balthazar	
27 March	Justice	Justin Bieber	
3 April	Justice	Justin Bieber	
10 April	Niemandsland	Tourist LeMC	
17 April	Niemandsland	Tourist LeMC	
24 April	Liefde voor muziek (2021)	Various artists	
1 May	Liefde voor muziek (2021)	Various artists	
8 May	Liefde voor muziek (2021)	Various artists	
15 May	Hidden Stories	Hooverphonic	
22 May	The Off-Season	J. Cole	
29 May	Vivre (Parce que – La Collection)	Arno featuring Sofiane Pamart	
5 June	Vivre (Parce que – La Collection)	Arno featuring Sofiane Pamart	
12 June	Vivre (Parce que – La Collection)	Arno featuring Sofiane Pamart	
19 June	Sour	Olivia Rodrigo	
26 June	Several Others	Whispering Sons	
3 July	Vuurwerk	Camille	
10 July	Sour	Olivia Rodrigo	
17 July	Sour	Olivia Rodrigo	
24 July	Sour	Olivia Rodrigo	
31 July	De weg naar het geluk	Jo Vally	
7 August	Happier Than Ever	Billie Eilish	
14 August	Happier Than Ever	Billie Eilish	
21 August	Happier Than Ever	Billie Eilish	
28 August	Sour	Olivia Rodrigo	
4 September	Donda	Kanye West	
11 September	Senjutsu	Iron Maiden	
18 September	Sterker	Niels Destadsbader	
25 September	Sterker	Niels Destadsbader	
2 October	Sterker	Niels Destadsbader	
9 October	De kat zat op de krant	Bart Peeters	
16 October	De kat zat op de krant	Bart Peeters	
23 October	Music of the Spheres	Coldplay	
30 October	The Shimmer	Oscar and the Wolf	
6 November	Metejoor	Metejoor	
13 November	Voyage	ABBA	
20 November	Voyage	ABBA	
27 November	30	Adele	
4 December	30	Adele	
11 December	30	Adele	
18 December	30	Adele	
25 December	Waterval	K3	

== Wallonia ==
List of number-one albums of 2021 in Wallonia
Issue date	Album	Artist	Reference
2 January	The Singles Collection (1981–2001)	Indochine	
9 January	The Singles Collection (1981–2001)	Indochine	
16 January	Dans les mains	ZKR	
23 January	The Singles Collection (1981–2001)	Indochine	
30 January	The Singles Collection (1981–2001)	Indochine	
6 February	La liberté d'aimer	Frédéric François	
13 February	140 BPM 2	Hamza	
20 February	Terrien	Julien Clerc	
27 February	Terrien	Julien Clerc	
6 March	Sand	Balthazar	
13 March	2021: À côté de vous	Les Enfoirés	
20 March	2021: À côté de vous	Les Enfoirés	
27 March	Jvlivs II	SCH	
3 April	Jvlivs II	SCH	
10 April	Jvlivs II	SCH	
17 April	Jvlivs II	SCH	
24 April	The Battle at Garden's Gate	Greta Van Fleet	
1 May	Jvlivs II	SCH	
8 May	Qalf	Damso	
15 May	Qalf	Damso	
22 May	Qalf	Damso	
29 May	Vivre (Parce que – La Collection)	Arno featuring Sofiane Pamart	
5 June	Raw Tour – Live	Typh Barrow	
12 June	Vivre (Parce que – La Collection)	Arno featuring Sofiane Pamart	
19 June	Cœur	Clara Luciani	
26 June	Cœur	Clara Luciani	
3 July	Demain ça ira	Jul	
10 July	Cœur	Clara Luciani	
17 July	Cœur	Clara Luciani	
24 July	L'étrange histoire de Mr. Anderson	Laylow	
31 July	L'étrange histoire de Mr. Anderson	Laylow	
7 August	Happier Than Ever	Billie Eilish	
14 August	Happier Than Ever	Billie Eilish	
21 August	Happier Than Ever	Billie Eilish	
28 August	Plus grandir	Mylène Farmer	
4 September	Donda	Kanye West	
11 September	Senjutsu	Iron Maiden	
18 September	L'histoire continue... Acte II	Johnny Hallyday	
25 September	L'avenir	Florent Pagny	
2 October	L'avenir	Florent Pagny	
9 October	L'avenir	Florent Pagny	
16 October	L'avenir	Florent Pagny	
23 October	Music of the Spheres	Coldplay	
30 October	Music of the Spheres	Coldplay	
6 November	=	Ed Sheeran	
13 November	Voyage	ABBA	
20 November	Voyage	ABBA	
27 November	Civilisation	Orelsan	
4 December	Civilisation	Orelsan	
11 December	Nonante-Cinq	Angèle	
18 December	Nonante-Cinq	Angèle	
25 December	Nonante-Cinq	Angèle	

== See also ==
- List of Ultratop 50 number-one singles of 2021
