= TW Classic =

Music festival in Werchter, Belgium

Coordinates: 50°58′5″N 4°41′3″E

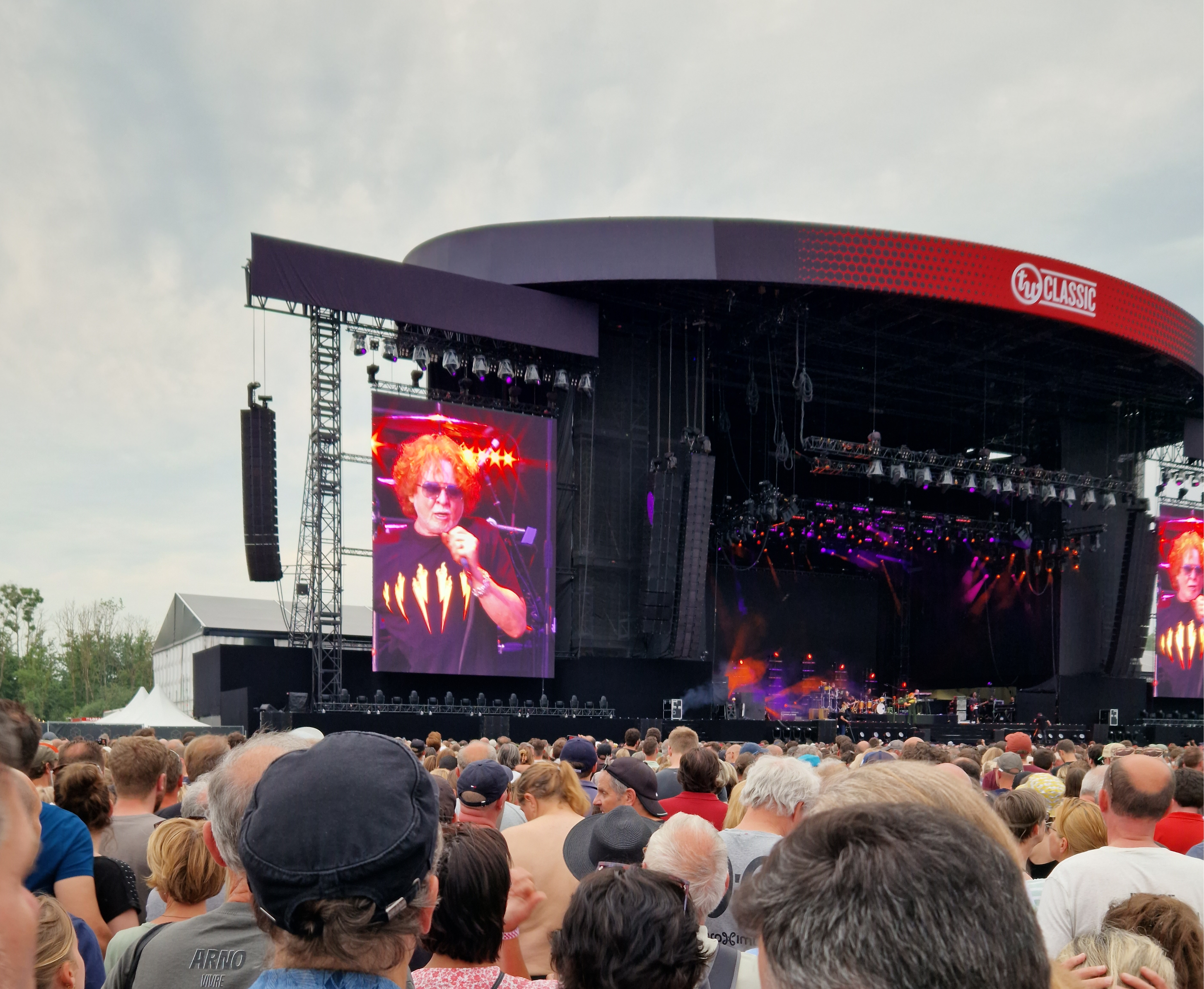
- Simply Red during the 2023 edition
- Genre: Alternative rock, rock, indie rock, pop, hip hop, heavy metal, electronic music, dance music
- Locations: Werchter Festivalpark, Werchter, Belgium
- Years active: 2002–2019, 2022–present
- Capacity: 60.000
- Organiser: Live Nation
- Website: Festival Website

TW Classic (also stylised T/W Classic) is a Belgian music festival. It is a one-day event organized annually, usually prior to the Rock Werchter festival.

== History ==
TW Classic originated from the Rock Werchter festival ('TW', as in Torhout-Werchter, is the traditional abbreviation of the festival). That festival has become one of the leading festivals in the world and now runs over four days. The organization wanted to give something back to first-time visitors and decided to organize a festival according to the old concept of one summer day in the weekend and one stage. Mainly experienced and successful artists perform, supported by local Belgian and Dutch groups.

The festival takes place in the same location as the Rock Werchter festival, this is the festival area in Werchter. The date is usually sometime in late June or early July, although this may change depending on the availability of the main act.

== List of lineups ==
=== 2002 ===
Bryan Adams, Joe Cocker, Zucchero, Clouseau, Sita

=== 2003 ===
The Rolling Stones, Simple Minds, Clouseau, Therapy?, De Mens

=== 2004 ===
Phil Collins, The Corrs, Alicia Keys, Jasper Steverlinck, Mike and the Mechanics + Paul Carrack, BLØF

=== 2005 ===
Lenny Kravitz, Duran Duran, Arno, Novastar, Brian Wilson, Gabriel Ríos

=== 2006 ===
Bryan Adams, Sting, Simply Red, Simple Minds, Roxy Music, Arsenal

=== 2007 ===
Elton John, John Fogerty, Anouk, P!nk, Orchestral Manoeuvres in the Dark, Tom Helsen

=== 2008 ===
The Police, Iggy Pop & The Stooges, The Scabs, Juanes, Milow

=== 2009 ===
Depeche Mode, Basement Jaxx, Moby, Keane, Duffy, Tom Helsen, Motor

=== 2010 ===
The Black Eyed Peas, Mika, Scissor Sisters, Simple Minds, Daan, Amy Macdonald, Arid, The Opposites

=== 2011 ===
Bryan Adams, Texas, Simple Minds, James Blunt, Faces feat. Mick Hucknall, Gabriel Ríos, Selah Sue

=== 2012 ===
Lenny Kravitz, Sting, De Kreuners, Kaiser Chiefs, Amy Macdonald, 't Hof van Commerce, The Scabs

=== 2013 ===
Bruce Springsteen & The E Street Band, Keane, Santana, Ben Harper & Charlie Musselwhite, Blondie, Balthazar

=== 2014 ===
The Rolling Stones, Simple Minds, Triggerfinger, Arno, Seasick Steve, Admiral Freebee

=== 2015 ===
Robbie Williams, Faithless, Anouk, Texas, Anastacia, The Scabs

=== 2016 ===
Bruce Springsteen & the E Street Band, Lana Del Rey, Lionel Richie, Simply Red, The Van Jets, CC Smugglers

=== 2017 ===
Guns N' Roses, The Pretenders, Wolfmother, Channel Zero, Fleddy Melculy

=== 2018 ===
Editors, The National, Kraftwerk 3-D, dEUS, Nataniel Rateliff and the Night Sweats, Richard Ashcroft, BLØF

=== 2019 ===
Bon Jovi, John Fogerty, Anouk, Skunk Anansie, John Butler Trio, Switchfoot, Jimmy Barnes

=== 2020 ===
No edition due to COVID-19 pandemic. Planned line up: Paul McCartney, The Killers, Crowded House, Kaiser Chiefs, Sinéad O'Connor, Sons

=== 2021 ===
No edition due to COVID-19 pandemic.

=== 2022 ===
Nick Cave and the Bad Seeds, Placebo, The Smile, The Specials, Florence and the Machine, The Kid Laroi, Sleaford Mods, Courtney Barnett, Whispering Sons, Noordkaap

=== 2023 ===
Bruce Springsteen & The E Street Band, Simply Red, Jack Johnson, Triggerfinger

=== 2024 ===
No edition because no suitable date was found with the possible headliners

=== 2025 ===
Robbie Williams, Bryan Adams, Texas, Skunk Anansie, Lottory Winners, Portland

=== 2026 ===
The edition was cancelled due to an important medical procedure for Keith Scott of Bryan Adams’ band. It proved impossible to secure an artist of similar stature and genre. Planned line up: Bryan Adams, dEUS, Elvis Costello, Counting Crows, Monza
