= Thierry Jaspart =

- Born: May 1986 (age 40); Eupen, Belgium
- Website: https://thierry-jaspart.com/

Thierry Jaspart (born May 1986) is a Belgian visual artist.

== Work ==
=== Illustrations ===
In 2008, Jaspart, whilst living in Liège, Belgium, began publishing his illustrations and had his art featured in an exhibition in Liège. He still continues to publish illustrations to this day and has provided illustrations for articles.

=== Street art and graffiti ===
Jaspart has created sticker and poster campaigns, one of which being the Je suis partout campaign which featured a triangular cartoon bird which could be found around the world. Jaspart's other campaign was J'EXISTE. which featured large stickers and posters with the phrase, translating to 'I exist' in French, found around the world. Jaspart created a clothing brand featuring the J'EXISTE. design alongside Marseille-based artist Jeremy Vandenbosch.

Jaspart has made use of graffiti, using his real name in the graffiti tags.

=== Belgium's Got Talent ===
In both 2013 and 2014, Jaspart performed absurd performances on Belgium's Got Talent.

=== Conceptual art ===
Jaspart frequently posts conceptual art videos on his website, many of which featuring absurd situations, such as painting graffiti tags with a marker full of water, tagging the drainpipe of a church in Antwerp, Belgium then confessing his crime to the priest of the church, and 'SMS graffiti', where Jaspart texted his J'EXISTE. tag to hundreds of random phone numbers.

In 2020, Jaspart co-founded an ecologist neofolk band called Chien Chiant, which translates to 'annoying dog' in French, which neither records music nor performs concerts in order to reduce their carbon footprint.
