= Belgium's Got Talent =

Belgian television program

- Genre: Reality television
- Presented by: Koen Wauters; Laura Tesoro
- Judges: Karen Damen; Rob Vanoudenhoven; Ray Cokes; Niels Destadsbader; An Lemmens; Stan Van Samang; Dan Karaty; Jens Dendoncker; Ruth Beeckmans; Bart Peeters; Davy Parmentier
- Country of origin: Belgium
- Original language: Dutch
- No. of seasons: 7

Original release
- Network: VTM
- Release: 31 August 2012 – 19 November 2021

Related
- Britain's Got Talent; Belgium's Got Talent (Walloon TV series); Supertalent in Vlaanderen

Belgium's Got Talent is the Dutch language format of the Got Talent series, which was created by Simon Cowell. It is broadcast on the Flemish language channel VTM and is hosted by Koen Wauters and Laura Tesoro.

Judges on the program have included Rob Vanoudenhoven (seasons 1–3), Karen Damen (seasons 1–3) and Ray Cokes (seasons 1–3). Later, the cast of judges featured Dan Karaty (seasons 4-6), An Lemmens (seasons 4–7), Stan Van Samang (seasons 4–6) and Niels Destadsbader (seasons 3–6). Bart Peeters judged the seventh season

The first season, which was in 2012, was won by Karolien Goris who was an 11 year old singer. The second season, which was in 2013, was won by Michael Lanzo who was a 34 year old singer. After the series was off the air in 2014, it returned for the third season in 2015 who was won by an Italian named Domenico Vaccaro who was a 22 year old pole dancer. The fourth season, which was in 2016 and 2017, is won by Baba Yega who are a dance troupe. The fifth season was in 2018, and was won by Tascha and Ian, who are an acrobatic dance couple. Season 6 (2019) was won by Benjamin Ceyssens, a piano composer, and season 7 (2021) by Mini Droids, a breakdance group.
