= Nu wij niet meer praten =

2020 single by Jaap Reesema & Pommelien Thijs

Single by Jaap Reesema and Pommelien Thijs

from the album Als je voor me staat
- Language: Dutch
- Released: 9 October 2020
- Length: 3:12
- Label: CNR Music
- Songwriters: Joren van de Voort; Arno Krabman; Jaap Reesema
- Producers: Krabman; Reesema

Jaap Reesema singles chronology
"Calling It Home" (2019)	"Nu wij niet meer praten" (2020)	"Alles komt goed" (2021)

Pommelien Thijs singles chronology
"Nu wij niet meer praten" (2020)	"Tranen" (2021)

"Nu wij niet meer praten" (lit. 'Now We Don't Talk Anymore') is a song by Dutch singer Jaap Reesema in collaboration with Belgian actress and singer Pommelien Thijs. It would be featured on Reesema's 2023 studio album Als je voor me staat. The song marked Thijs' debut as a singer.

It became a number one song in the Dutch Top 40 and Belgian Ultratop 50. The song was certified Diamond in the Netherlands by the NVPI in June 2024.

== Background ==
"Nu wij niet meer praten" launched Thijs' singing career, as she was known primarily for being an actress before this. Sony Music took note of the song's success and signed Thijs as a result. She halted her biology studies at KU Leuven to focus on music full-time.

The opening lyric of the song, "Zing je nog steeds mee met liedjes van Marco?" (English: Do you still sing along to Marco's songs?) refers to the popular Dutch singer Marco Borsato. Borsato was accused of, and eventually charged with, child sexual abuse beginning in 2021. In a 2022 video, Thijs hung a poster in the background that read "No, we no longer sing along to Marco’s songs." In 2024, videos went viral on social media of Thijs' concerts, where she holds the microphone to the audience immediately after singing the line and the crowd loudly screams "No!" in response. This occurred regularly at Thijs' shows, including in Utrecht and Weert.

== Commercial performance ==
The song was Reesema's first appearance on the Dutch Top 40 in over a decade. When it reached number one, Thijs became the second Belgian woman ever to do so in the Netherlands. At 19 years old, Thijs also became the youngest Belgian artist with a number-one hit in both Belgium and the Netherlands.

== Charts ==
=== Weekly charts ===
Chart (2020–21)	Peak position
Belgium (Ultratop 50 Flanders)	1
Netherlands (Dutch Top 40)	1
Netherlands (Single Top 100)	2

=== Yearly charts ===
Chart (2020)	Position
Belgium (Ultratop 50 Flanders)	83
Netherlands (Dutch Top 40)	89

Chart (2021)	Position
Belgium (Ultratop 50 Flanders)	12
Netherlands (Dutch Top 40)	30
Netherlands (Single Top 100)	33
