= Atlas (Pommelien Thijs song) =

2025 song by Pommelien Thijs

Single by Pommelien Thijs

from the album Gedoe
- Language: Dutch
- Released: 21 March 2025
- Genre: Folk pop
- Label: Sony Music Entertainment
- Songwriters: Pommelien Thijs, Simon de Wilt
- Producer: Blanks

Pommelien Thijs singles chronology
"Het midden" (2024)	"Atlas" (2025)	"Tegenwoordige tijd" (2025)

"Atlas" is a song by Belgian musician and actress Pommelien Thijs. It was released on 21 March 2025 as the third single from her second studio album, Gedoe. The song was written by Thijs with producer Blanks (Simon de Wilt).

The song spent 22 weeks at number one in the Flanders region of Belgium, becoming the longest-running number-one hit in Flemish history. It was Thijs' sixth number-one hit on the Flemish Ultratop 50. "Atlas" also peaked at number four on the Dutch Top 40. It was the best-selling and the third most-streamed single in Flanders for 2025. The song won "Hit of the Year" at the Music Industry Awards, marking her fourth consecutive win.

== Background ==
The song is named after the figure in Greek mythology, who has to carry the weight of the world on his shoulders. Thijs used the reference to describe an unbalanced relationship. She said that it took months for her to finish writing the song, and that the lyrics incorporate several stories from her real relationship experiences. Thijs also said that the lyric "Sorry dat ik jou nog op handen draag" (lit. 'I'm sorry that I still have you in my hands') could also be interpreted sarcastically.

== Music video ==
Thijs directed the music video for "Atlas" fully by herself, and she also dances and plays the guitar in it.

== Reception ==
De Standaard praised the song for being a "complex break-up song" that avoids simple tropes. Oor believed that Thijs' vocal performance on "Atlas" sounded a bit immature.

== Commercial performance ==
"Atlas" debuted at number one on the Flanders Ultratop 50, becoming Thijs' sixth number-one in Belgium. It remained at number one for eight weeks before being replaced by Alex Warren's "Ordinary". It continued to trade spots with "Ordinary" multiple times, until July when it was briefly replaced by Ed Sheeran's "Azizam" for one week. In its fourth separate stint at number one, "Atlas" stayed there for ten more weeks, ultimately remaining at number one for 22 total weeks. This broke the record for longest number-one hit in Flanders, which was previously held by Tones and I's "Dance Monkey" and The Weeknd's "Blinding Lights", both of which were number one for 17 weeks.

== Charts ==
=== Weekly charts ===
Weekly chart performance for "Atlas"
Chart (2025–26)	Peak position
Belgium (Ultratop 50 Flanders)	1
Netherlands (Dutch Top 40)	5
Netherlands (Single Top 100)	4

=== Yearly charts ===
Year-end chart performance for "Atlas"
Chart (2025)	Position
Belgium (Ultratop 50 Flanders)	1
Netherlands (Dutch Top 40)	40
Netherlands (Single Top 100)	13
