= Gedoe =

2025 album by Pommelien Thijs

Studio album by Pommelien Thijs
- Released: 3 October 2025
- Genres: Pop; rock
- Language: Dutch
- Label: Sony Music
- Producers: Simon De Wit; The Companions

Pommelien Thijs chronology
| Per ongeluk (2023) | Gedoe (2025) |

Singles from Gedoe
- 1. "Het beste moet nog komen" Released: 21 February 2024; 2. "Het midden" Released: 19 October 2024; 3. "Atlas" Released: 29 March 2025; 4. "Tegenwoordige tijd" Released: 11 April 2025; 5. "Ben je klaar?" Released: 23 August 2025; 6. "Ik moet gaan" Released: 3 October 2025

Gedoe is the second album by Belgian singer Pommelien Thijs, released on 3 October 2025. It contains the Flemish number-one singles "Het beste moet nog komen", "Het midden" (a duet with Dutch singer Meau, No. 17 in the Netherlands), and "Atlas", which broke the record for longest stay at the top of the Flemish charts, where it spent 22 weeks. It was voted the VRT Zomerhit for 2025, and reached No. 4 in the Netherlands. Other singles from the album were "Tegenwoordige tijd" (only released for Record Store Day, reached No. 31 in Flanders) and "Ben je klaar?" (No. 2 in Flanders).

The album received good to excellent reviews, ranging from a 3-star review in the Dutch Volkskrant to 4-star reviews in Humo and De Standaard and a 5-star review in De Morgen.

== Track listing ==
All tracks are written by Pommelien Thijs, Stefan Van Leijsen and Sasha Rangas, except where noted.

| No. | Title | Writer(s) | Length |
|---|---|---|---|
| 1. | "Ben je klaar?" | Pommelien Thijs, Simon De Wit | 3:40 |
| 2. | "Atlas" | Thijs, De Wit | 3:00 |
| 3. | "Niemand is bijzonder" | | 2:58 |
| 4. | "Authentiek" | | 2:58 |
| 5. | "Tegenwoordige tijd" | | 4:03 |
| 6. | "Ik moet gaan" | | 2:43 |
| 7. | "Koning minimaliseren" | Thijs, Van Leijsen, Rangas, Charline D'Hoore | 2:55 |
| 8. | "Wie we morgen zijn" | | 3:18 |
| 9. | "Het midden" (featuring Meau) | Thijs, Van Leijsen, Rangas, Meau Hewitt | 2:41 |
| 10. | "Het beste moet nog komen" | Thijs, De Wit | 3:05 |
| 11. | "Doen of zijn" | | 3:01 |
| 12. | "Roekeloos" (featuring Wies) | Thijs, Van Leijsen, Rangas, Tim Leyman, Tobias Kolk, Dan Huijser, Jeanne Rouwendaal, Charline D'Hoore | 2:55 |
| 13. | "Bel me als je thuis bent" | Thijs, De Wit | 3:53 |
| 14. | "Cassandra" | | 3:34 |
| Total length: | | | 44:34 |

== Charts ==
=== Weekly charts ===
Weekly chart performance for Gedoe
| Chart (2025) | Peak position |
|---|---|
| Belgian Albums (Ultratop Flanders) | 1 |
| Belgian Albums (Ultratop Wallonia) | 42 |
| Dutch Albums (Album Top 100) | 2 |

=== Year-end charts ===
Year-end chart performance for Gedoe
| Chart (2025) | Position |
|---|---|
| Belgian Albums (Ultratop Flanders) | 1 |
