= Werchter =

- Location in Belgium
- Coordinates: 50°58′N 4°42′E
- Country: Belgium
- Region: Flemish Region
- Community: Flemish Community
- Province: Flemish Brabant
- Municipality: Rotselaar

Population (1 January 2013)
  - Total: 3,443

Werchter is a small village in Belgium which has been part of the municipality of Rotselaar since 1 January 1977. It is the site of Rock Werchter and the birthplace of the painters Cornelius Van Leemputten and Frans Van Leemputten. The origin of the Werchter's name is unknown, but is thought to be related to water.

== Werchter festival ground ==
=== Rock Werchter ===
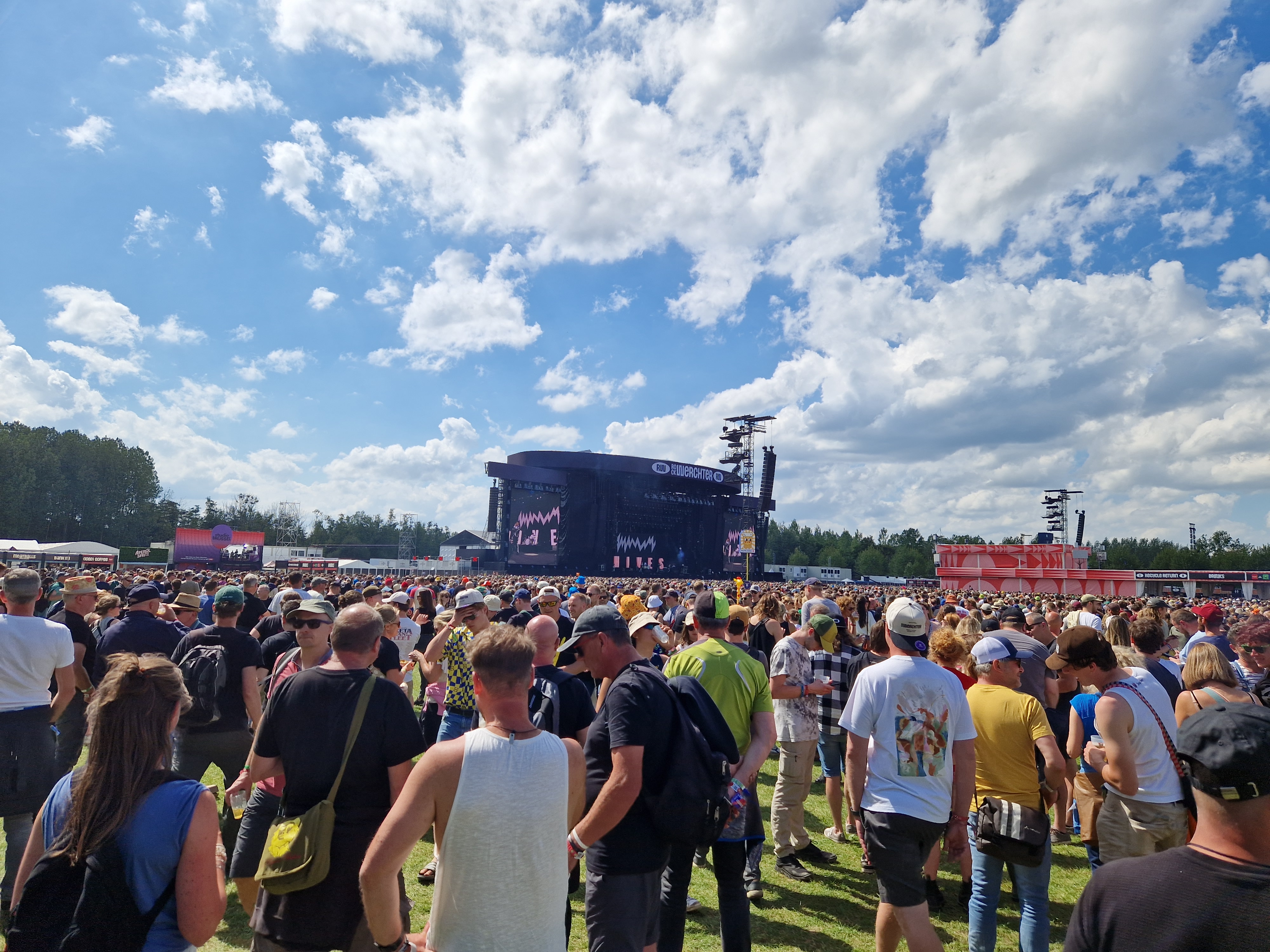
Rock Werchter main stage in 2024

Rock Werchter is a music festival held annually during the first weekend of the summer holidays in Werchter. It was first organised in 1974. Originally it was a double-festival, called "Rock Torhout-Werchter", with two festival areas on different places in Belgium: one in Torhout and one in Werchter, where the same artists performed the next day. Since 2003 the festival lasts four days. 6 times (between 2003 and 2014), the festival won the Arthur award for the best festival in the world of the International Live Music Conference. It's the largest music festival in Belgium and one of the largest festivals in Europe. Famous over the Belgian borders, each year many renowned groups and artists perform at Rock Werchter, and over 320,000 people come to the festival. There is also a "Rock Werchterroute", a cycling route, around Werchter and Leuven, which also organises an annual music festival, Marktrock.

=== Separate concerts ===
The next concerts were organized on the festival grounds outside the concept of Rock Werchter, or its satellite festivals T/W Classic and Werchter Boutique.

Date	Headliner	Support act	Headliner tour
9 August 1980	The Police	XTC, Skafish	Zenyatta Mondatta Tour
10 June 1983	Supertramp	Chris De Burgh, Nena	Famous Last Tour
2 June 1987	David Bowie	Nona Hendryx	Glass Spider Tour
23 August 1988	Michael Jackson	Taylor Dayne	Bad World Tour
13 May 1989	Pink Floyd		A Momentary Lapse of Reason Tour
4 August 1990	Prince	Loïs Lane	Nude Tour
27 May 1992	Dire Straits		On Every Street Tour
28 June 1992	Genesis		We Can't Dance Tour
22 July 1992	Michael Jackson	Kriss Kross	Dangerous World Tour
29 May 1993	U2	Stereo MC’s, Urban Dance Squad	Zoo TV Tour
11 July 1993	Guns N’ Roses	The Brian May Band, Suicidal Tendencies	Use Your Illusion Tour
2 September 1994	Pink Floyd		The Division Bell Tour
17 June 1995	Bon Jovi	Van Halen, Ugly Kid Joe	These Days Tour
14 June 1996	Bryan Adams	Melissa Etheridge	18 Til I Die Tour
25 July 1997	U2		Popmart Tour
20 and 21 June 1998	The Rolling Stones	Simple Minds	Bridges to Babylon Tour
25 July 2000	Tina Turner	John Fogerty, Taxiride	Twenty Four Seven Tour
11 and 12 September 2000	Radiohead	Sigur Rós	Kid A/Amnesiac Tour
3 June 2001	Bon Jovi	Melanie C, Fred & the Healers	One Wild Night Tour
5 June 2007	The Rolling Stones	Van Halen, Ugly Kid Joe	A Bigger Bang Tour
20 July 2013	Roger Waters		The Wall Live
16 May 2016	AC/DC	Tyler Bryant & the Shakedown, Black Box Revelation	Rock or Bust World Tour
1 July 2018	Ed Sheeran	Anne-Marie, Jamie Lawson	÷ Tour
24 June 2023	Harry Styles	Wet Leg	Love on Tour
2 July 2024	Bruce Springsteen	Seasick Steve, Black Box Revelation	Springsteen and E Street Band 2023–2025 Tour
