= Faulhaber =

Faulhaber is a German surname. Notable people with the surname include:

- Gerrit Faulhaber (1912–1951), Indonesian footballer
- Hanna Faulhaber (born 2004), American freestyle skier
- Johann Faulhaber (1580–1635), German mathematician
- Markus Faulhaber (1914–1945), Sturmbannführer in the Waffen SS
- Michael von Faulhaber (1869–1952), German Roman Catholic Cardinal

== See also ==
- Faulhaber's formula
