= Carlos Vaquera =

Carlos Vaquera (born December 8, 1962, in León, Spain) is an international artist who mixes magic with poetry, mime with humour, and illusions with the power of the mind. He has won, among other awards, the European championship of close-up magic in London, the first prize of close-up in Las Vegas, and the "French Societies of Illusionism" rewarded him by giving him the "Mandrake d' Or" (the equivalent of the Oscars in the film industry). He worked as a host on the national Belgium television (RTBF) and as an actor in theaters. He is also a coach on body language and influence. He has written many articles on the subject.

== Awards ==
- Society of American Magicians, 1987, Las Vegas
- International Brotherhood of Magicians, 1987, Nashville
- Kevin Reay Trophy, International Close Up Competition, 1987, Belgium
- Mandrake d'Or, 2005 in Paris France

== One man shows ==
"Démons et Merveilles" "iMAGIEnaire" "L'Apprenti-Sage"

== Special events ==
- The "Gala de la Croix Rouge" in the presence of Prince Rainier of Monaco, Princess Caroline, Princess Stephanie and Prince Albert
- "Bal de la Rose" in the presence of Prince Rainier of Monaco, Princess Caroline, Princess Stephanie and Prince Albert
- 50th birthday of Prince Albert of Belgium in the presence of Princess Paola and Princess Astrid
- 17th World Magic Convention
- Show of mentalism in front of the Belgian royal family for the 18 years of prince Amedéo.
- "Best of Belgium - Une fête Royale" for the 175th years of Belgium in the "Four Seasons" of Hong Kong in presence of the Belgium prime minister Guy Verhofstadt and the minister of finances Didier Reynders.
- International Film Festival in Cannes
- Le 18ème anniversaire du Prince Amadéo en présence de la famille Royale Belge.
- L’anniversaire de la Princesse au Palais Royal.
