= Erop of eronder =

2023 song by Pommelien Thijs

Single by Pommelien Thijs

from the album Per ongeluk
- Language: Dutch
- Released: 8 juni 2023
- Genre: Pop
- Label: Sony Music Entertainment
- Songwriters: Pommelien Thijs, Sascha Rangas, Stefan van Leijsen, Simon de Wit
- Producers: Stefan van Leijsen, Sasha Rangas

Pommelien Thijs singles chronology
| "Kleine tornado" (2023) | "Erop of eronder" (2023) | "Medeplichtig" (2023) |

"Erop of eronder" is a song by Belgian musician and actress Pommelien Thijs. It was released on 8 June 2023 as the sixth single from her debut studio album Per ongeluk. The song was written by Thijs with the producers Sascha Rangas, Stefan van Leijsen, Simon de Wit.

The song spent 6 weeks at number one in the Flanders region of Belgium. The song won Hit of the Year at the 2023 Music Industry Awards en Summer Hit of the Year at VRT Zomerhit.

== Awards and nominations ==
| Year | Award | Category | Result |
|---|---|---|---|
| 2023 | Radio 2 Zomerhit | Summer Hit | Won |
| 2023 | Q-Pop (event) | Belgian Hit of the Year | Won |
| 2023 | Het Gala van de Gouden K's | Best Single | Won |
| 2023 | Music Industry Awards | Hit of the Year | Won |
| 2023 | Music Industry Awards | Best videoclip | Nominated |

== Charts ==
=== Weekly charts ===
Weekly chart performance for "Erop of eronder"
| Chart (2023–2024) | Peak position |
|---|---|
| Belgium (Ultratop 50 Flanders) | 1 |

=== Yearly charts ===
Year-end chart performance for "Erop of eronder"
| Chart (2023) | Position |
|---|---|
| Belgium (Ultratop 50 Flanders) | 7 |
| Chart (2024) | Position |
| Belgium (Ultratop 50 Flanders) | 42 |
