= Fixkes =

Belgian band

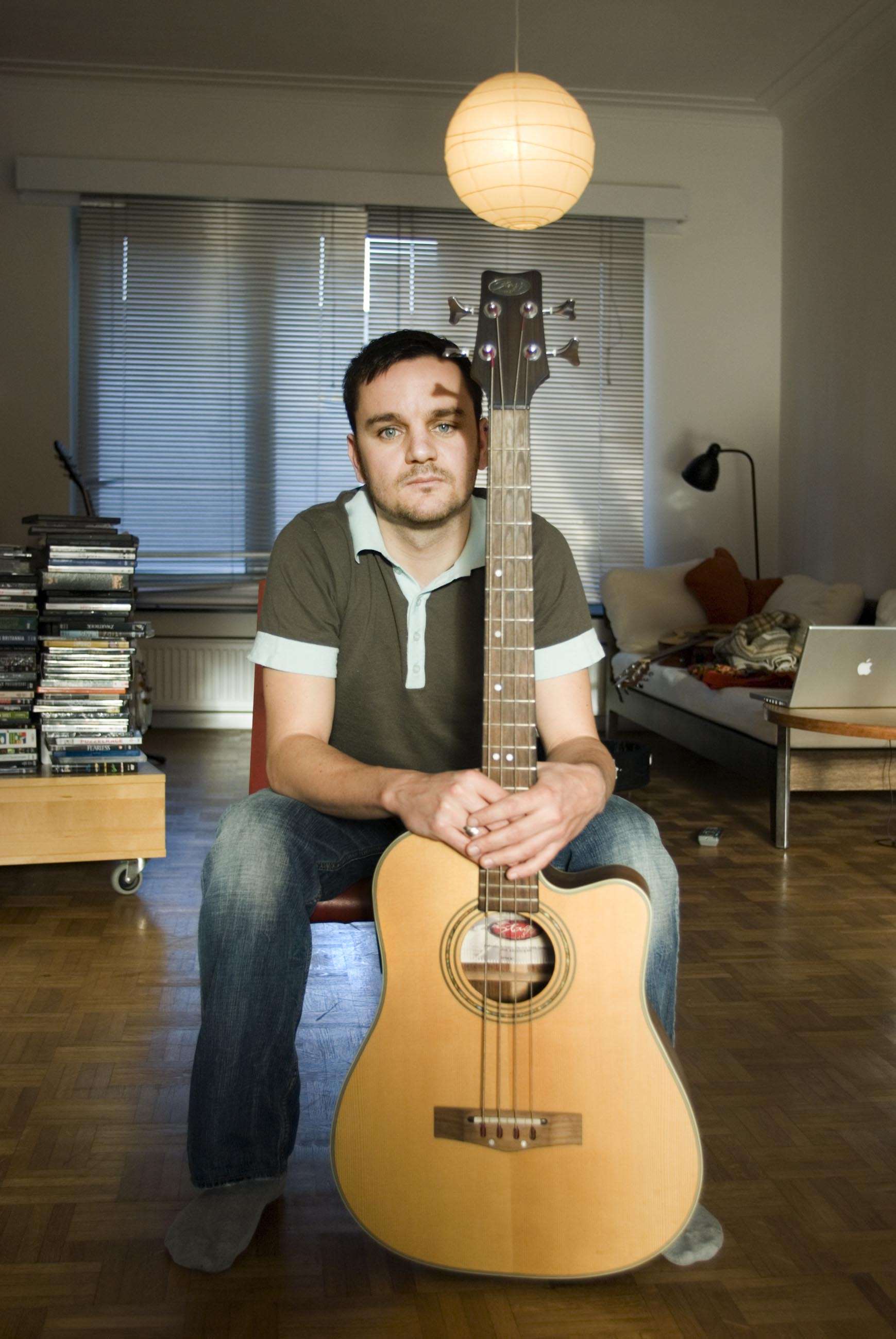
- Sam Valkenborgh of Fixkes (2007)

Background information
- Origin: Stabroek, Antwerp, Belgium
- Genres: Alternative
- Years active: 2005; present
- Labels: Excelsior Recordings
- Members: Sam Valkenborgh, Peter Deckers, Johan Pauwels, Jan Valkenborgh, Bart Palmers, Joris Van den Broeck
- Website: fixkes.be

Fixkes is a Belgian band from Stabroek, near Antwerp. The band mixes acoustic pop and rap in their music. In February 2007, the band released their first official single, "Kvraagetaan". The single was a big success in Belgium and reached number 1 in the Belgian Ultratop chart.

== Band history ==
In November 2005 Fixkes was formed by Sam and Jan Valkenborgh. The name Fixkes is a nickname that Sam got in his teens. Jan plays the drums, Sam sings and plays guitar, he is also the songwriter of the group. The rest of the band's line-up was: Peter Deckers (guitar, harmonica), Johan Pauwels (bassguitar) and Bart Palmers (piano).

In January 2007, the band was picked up by the Dutch Excelsior Recordings. Fixkes released their first single only one month later, in February 2007. The lyrics of "Kvraagetaan" mainly appeal to nostalgic feelings of people in their 30s, who went to primary school in the 1980s (the title is a typical Flemish dialect term of that era, which can be roughly translated as "I ask him/her", and refers to a young boy or girl asking another kid to become "engaged", in a puppy love context). Radio station Studio Brussel launched the single as Hotshot. "Kvraagetaan" was released on iTunes reaching number 1 in the Belgian iTunes-charts. In March 2007 it reached number 1 on Ultratop remaining on top for a total of 16 weeks breaking the Belgian record for being at the number 1 position. The previous record was 12 weeks.

The band has had two more charting hits: "Ongelukkig" again in 2007 reaching number 16 and "Over 't water", the latter a collaboration with Axelle Red reaching number 4.

The band released 5 albums so far. The last one 'Danny en Danny' was released in 2025.

== Discography ==
=== Albums ===
Year	Album	Peak positions	Certification
Year	Album	BEL (Fl)	Certification
2007	Fixkes	3	
2010	Superheld	25	
2014	Weeral halfacht	14	

=== Singles ===
Year	Song	Peak positions	Certification
Year	Song	BEL (Fl)	Certification
2007	"Kvraagetaan"	1	BEL: Platinum
2007	"Ongelukkig"	16	
2007	Over 't water (with Axelle Red)	4	
2008	"Lievelingsdier"	16 (Ultratip*)	
2010	"Rock-'n-roll"	5 (Ultratip*)	
2014	"Jodie Foster"	81 (Ultratip*)	
2014	"Buitenmens"	21 (Ultratip*)	
2015	"Koriander van den Turk"	75 (Ultratip*)	
2015	"Ik weet niemand"	–	
2020	"Dardennen"	–	

*Did not appear in the official Belgian Ultratop 50 charts, but rather in the bubbling under Ultratip charts.
