= Gabriel Ríos =

Puerto Rican singer-songwriter (born 1978)

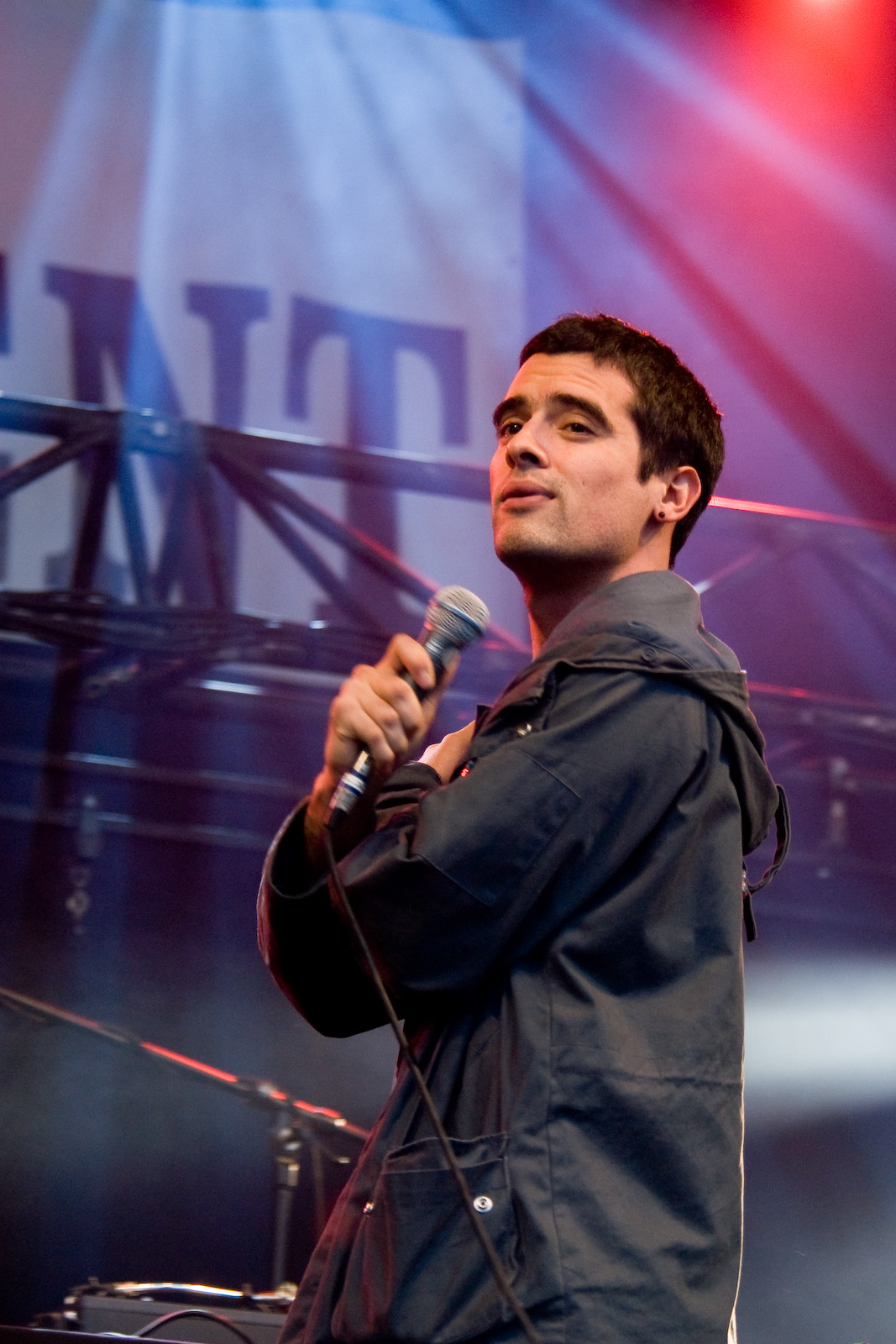

Background information
- Born: Gabriel Ríos; August 25, 1978 (age 48); San Juan, Puerto Rico
- Origin: Ghent, Belgium
- Genres: Pop; Singer-songwriter; Latin
- Occupation: Singer-songwriter
- Years active: 1996–present
- Label: PIAS Recordings
- Website: gabrielrios.live

Gabriel Ríos (born August 25, 1978) is a Puerto Rican singer-songwriter based in Belgium. He has released five studio albums between 2004 and 2021 and is best known for the singles "Broad Daylight" and "Gold".

== Early life ==
Ríos was born in San Juan, Puerto Rico, and grew up on the island. In 1996, at the age of 17, he moved to Ghent, Belgium, to study painting at the LUCA School of Arts.

== Career ==
=== Bands and Ghostboy (1996–2005) ===
After settling in Ghent, Ríos performed with the bands The Nothing Bastards and L. Santo before starting a solo career. His debut album Ghostboy was released in Belgium in 2004 and was produced by Jo Bogaert, known for his work with Technotronic. The album combined Latin, hip hop, rock and electronic music, and the single "Broad Daylight" received airplay in Belgium, the Netherlands and France. A live album, En Vivo, followed in 2005.

=== Angelhead and European Border Breakers Award (2007) ===
Ríos's second studio album, Angelhead, was released in 2007 and was again produced by Bogaert, with a stronger emphasis on pop electronica. That year he received a European Border Breakers Award (EBBA), an annual prize awarded by the European Commission to ten emerging European artists who had achieved success outside their home country.

=== The Dangerous Return (2010) ===
For his third studio album, The Dangerous Return (2010, PIAS), Ríos moved away from electronic instrumentation. The record was made with Belgian jazz pianist Jef Neve and percussionist Kobe Proesmans, who had been touring with him since 2008.

=== New York and This Marauder's Midnight (2011–2015) ===
In 2011 Ríos moved to New York City. Between October 2013 and 2014 he released one new song each month online; the first of these, "Gold", became a hit in Flanders. An unauthorized tropical house remix by Australian producer Thomas Jack subsequently went viral online. The songs were collected on his fourth studio album, This Marauder's Midnight, released in the Benelux in late 2014 and internationally in 2015. "Gold" won the public-voted "Hit van het Jaar" (Hit of the Year) at the Music Industry Awards (MIA) for 2014, presented at a televised ceremony in Lint on January 8, 2015.

=== Flore (2021) ===
Ríos's fifth studio album, Flore, was released in February 2021. It consists largely of Spanish-language reinterpretations of Latin American and Caribbean songs, including material by Rafael Hernández and Facundo Cabral, alongside several original compositions. The single "La Torre" was a duet with American singer-songwriter Devendra Banhart.

== Discography ==
Studio albums

- Ghostboy (2004)
- Angelhead (2007)
- The Dangerous Return (2010)
- This Marauder's Midnight (2014)
- Flore (2021)

Live album

- En Vivo (2005)

== Awards ==
Year	Award	Category	Result
2007	European Border Breakers Award	—	Won
2007	Music Industry Award	Album of the Year ("Angelhead")	Won
2014	Music Industry Award	Hit van het Jaar ("Gold")	Won
2014	Music Industry Award	Author / Componist	Won
