= Pommelien Thijs =

Belgian actress and pop singer

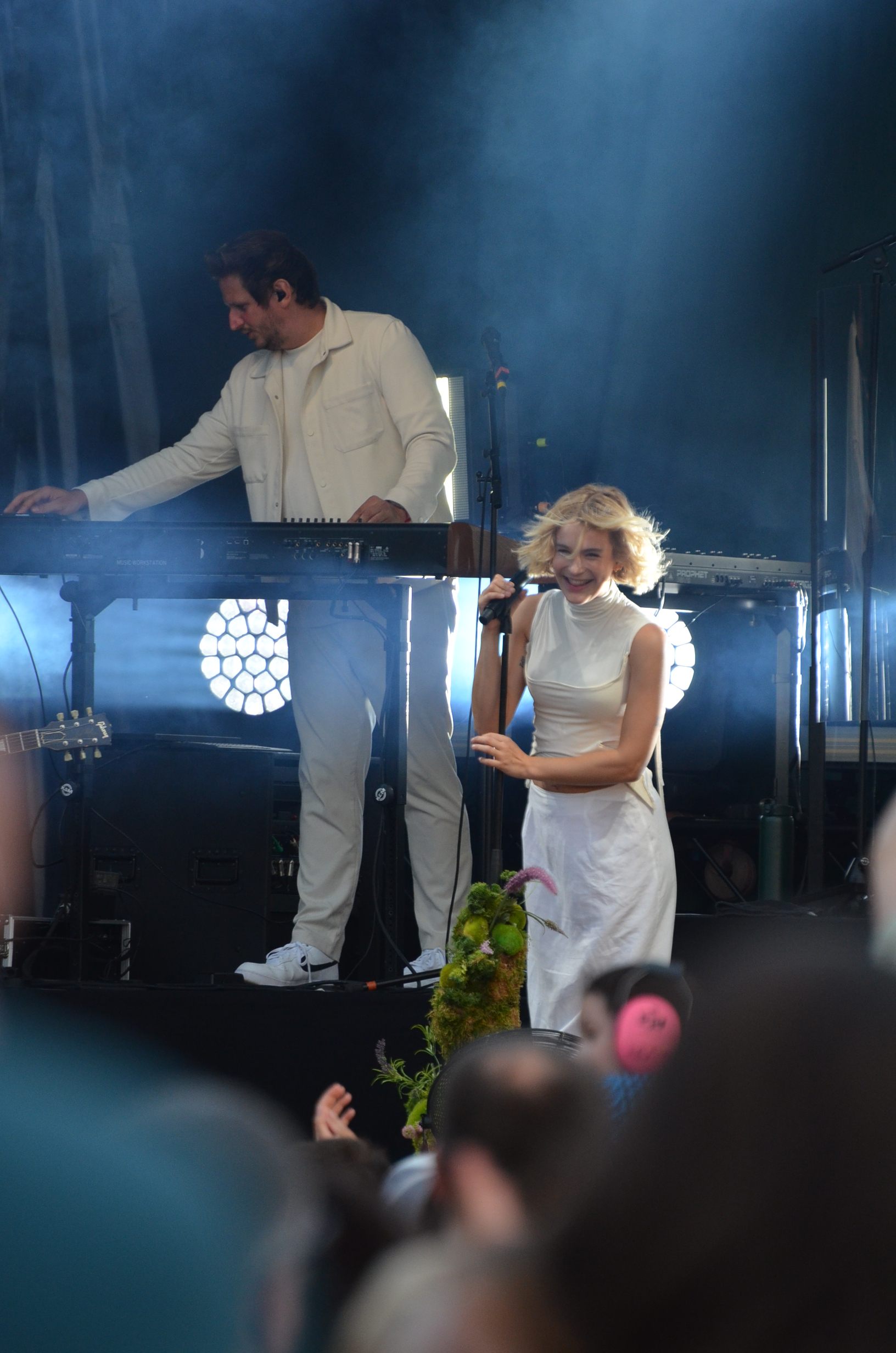
- Thijs in 2025
- Born: 4 April 2001 (age 25); Kessel, Belgium
- Occupations: Singer; actress
- Years active: 2010–present
- Website: pommelienthijs.be

Pommelien Thijs (born 4 April 2001) is a Belgian singer and actress. She began acting at the age of nine and became known for roles in the series #LikeMe and Knokke Off.

Thijs launched her singing career in 2020 with "Nu wij niet meer praten", a duet with Jaap Reesema which reached number one in both Flanders and the Netherlands. She became the youngest Belgian artist with a number one hit in both countries. In 2025, her song "Atlas" spent 22 weeks at number one on the Flemish Belgian Ultratop 50, breaking the record for longest-running number one in the chart's history.

== Career ==
She first appeared in the Flemish children's programme Ketnet kookt in 2010. In 2012 and 2013, Thijs was one of two actresses portraying the title character in the Dutch-language version of the musical Annie in the Stadsschouwburg in Antwerp and the Capitole in Gent. She was cast after participating in the television show Op zoek naar Annie ("Looking for Annie").

Pommelien Thijs rose to fame as "Caro" in the Flemish teenage television series #LikeMe. Together with the cast of the show she performed several concerts across Flanders. After starring in a supporting role in the 2020 film De familie Claus and its two sequels, she received critical acclaim in 2023 for her portrayal of "Louise" in the successful fiction series Knokke Off.

Since 2020, she had five number one singles on the Flemish Ultratop charts, with "Nu wij niet meer praten" (2020), a duet with Dutch singer Jaap Reesema, and "Ongewoon" (2022), "Erop of eronder" (2023), "Het Midden" with Meau, "Het beste moet nog komen" (both 2024) and "Atlas" (2025) . For "Erop of eronder" she won the award for the "summer hit of the year" from Radio 2. Thijs won 12 Music Industry Awards including 3 Hit of the Year awards.

In 2023, Thijs served as a coach on the seventh season of The Voice Kids alongside Coely, Laura Tesoro, and Metejoor. Sikudhani Wangui Mbugua, a member of Thijs's team, won the season making Thijs the winning coach.

In 2024 and 2025, Thys performed on the main stage at mid-size and major festivals such as Rock Werchter and Pukkelpop in Belgium, and Pinkpop in the Netherlands. Although always scheduled for daytime concerts, her performances attracted a large audience and were also well-reviewed.

"Nowadays, Pommelien Thijs is the biggest pop star in the Benelux."

— Author Bryan Regtop on 15 August 2025

With 41 million streams, her second album Gedoe (translated: Hassle) was ranked 5th on Spotify's list of most streamed new albums worldwide in October 2025, a unique achievement for an exclusively Dutch-language album. The album's third single "Atlas" spent 22 non-consecutive weeks at number one on the Flemish Belgian Ultratop 50, breaking the record for most weeks at number one.

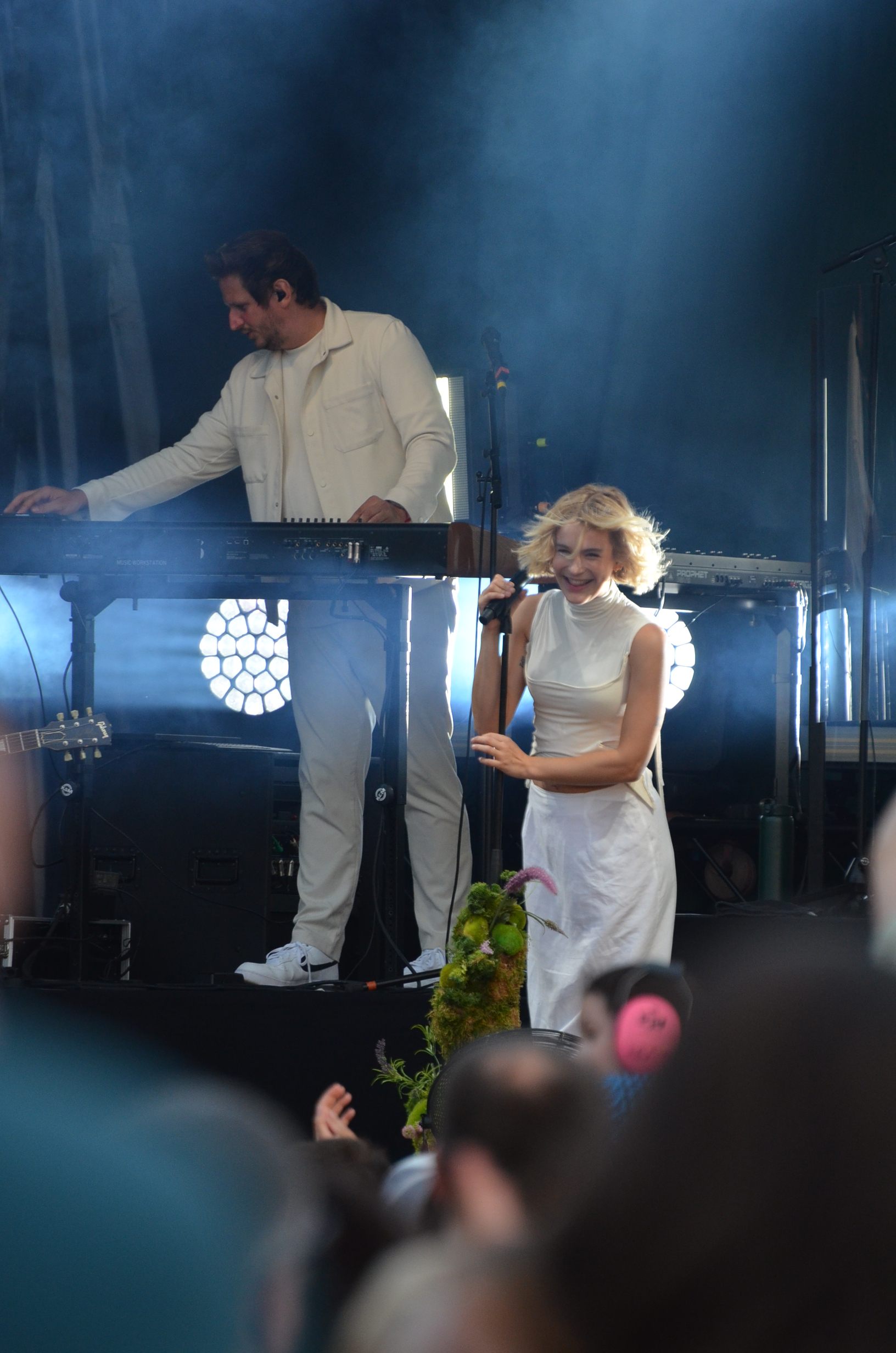
Thijs performing on 10 August 2024

== Personal life ==
Thijs is openly bisexual. Her 2022 song "Ongewoon" was written about the first time she experienced feelings for a woman, and she kisses Belgian television presenter Flo Windey in the music video.

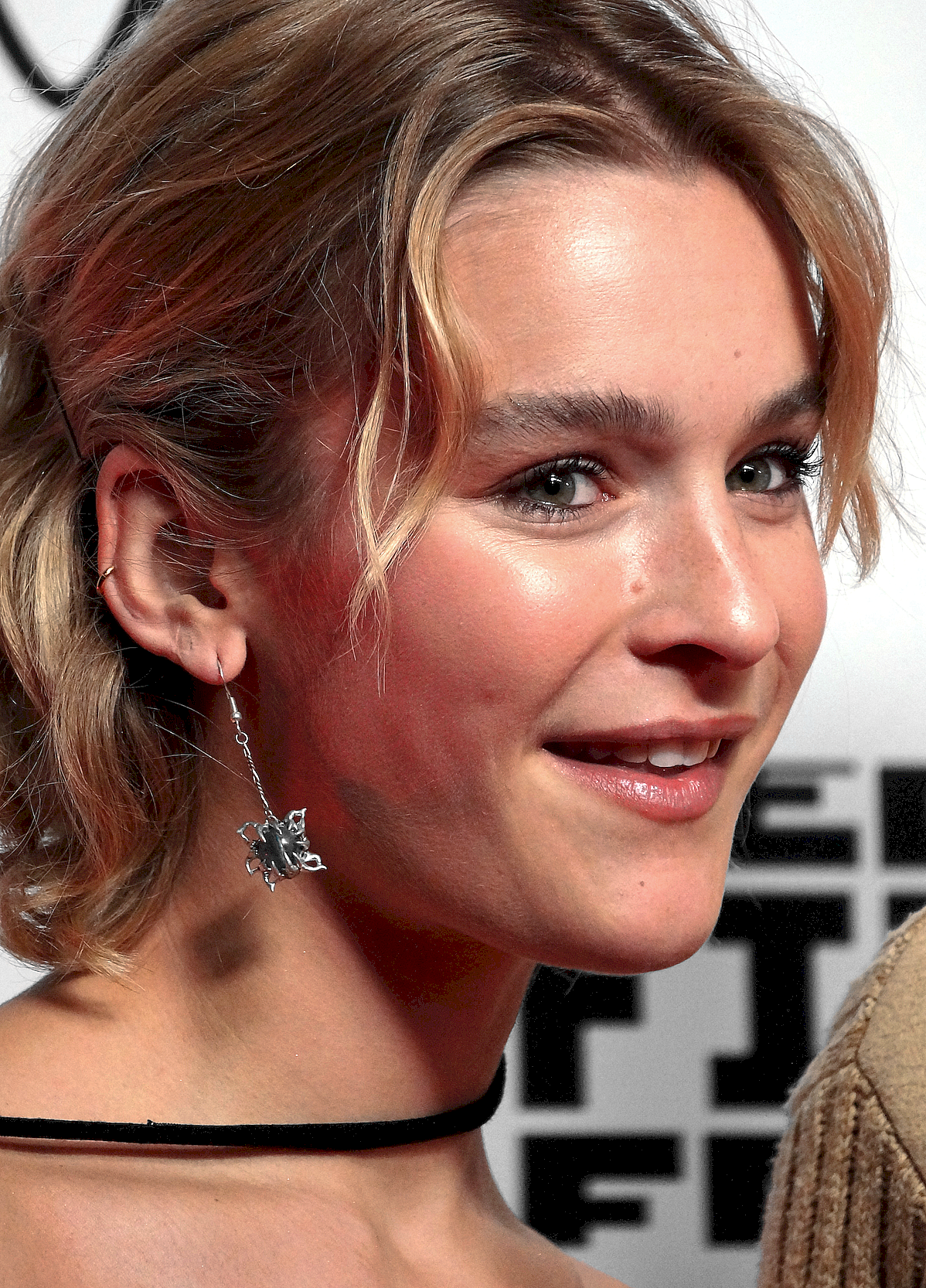
Thijs at the 2025 Film Fest Gent

== Filmography ==
=== TV series ===
- Vermist (2013)
- Vriendinnen (2015)
- #LikeMe (2019–2024)
- Lisa (2021–2022)
- Knokke Off (2023–2025)

=== Films ===
- Labyrinthus (2014)
- Piepkuikens (2015)
- The Claus Family (2020)
- De Familie Claus 2 (2021)
- De Familie Claus 3 (2022)
- Patsers (2025)

== Discography ==
=== Albums ===
Year	Album	Peak positions	
Year	Album	BEL (Fl)	NED
2023	Per ongeluk	1	18
2025	Gedoe	1	2

=== Singles ===
Year	Title	Peak chart positions			Certifications	Album
Year	Title	BEL (FL)	NL 40	NL 100	Certifications	Album
2020	"Nu wij niet meer praten" (with Jaap Reesema)	1	1	2	BEA: 2× Platinum	Non-album singles
2021	"Tranen" (with Kris Kross Amsterdam)	14	—	73	BEA: Gold	Non-album singles
2021	"Meisjes van honing"	17	—	—		Per ongeluk
2022	"Ongewoon"	1	—	—		Per ongeluk
2022	"Wat een idee!?"	3	—	—		Per ongeluk
2022	"Zilver"	6	—	—		Per ongeluk
2023	"Hypothetisch"	18	—	—		Per ongeluk
2023	"Kleine tornado"	38	—	—		Per ongeluk
2023	"Erop of eronder"	1	—	—		Per ongeluk
2023	"Medeplichtig"	5	—	—	BEA: Platinum	Non-album singles
2023	"Hou mij vast" (with Bazart)	4	—	—	BEA: Platinum	Non-album singles
2024	"Het beste moet nog komen"	1	—	—	BEA: Platinum	Gedoe
2024	"Het midden" (with Meau)	1	17	45		Gedoe
2025	"Atlas"	1	5	4	BEA: 4× Platinum	Gedoe
2025	"Tegenwoordige Tijd"	31	—	—	BEA: Platinum	Gedoe
2025	"Ben je klaar?"	2	—	58	BEA: Platinum	Gedoe
2025	"Ik moet gaan"	2	35	70	BEA: Gold	Gedoe
2026	"Onomatopee"	8	—	—		Non-album single

=== Other charted songs ===
Year	Title	Peak chart positions	Album
Year	Title	BEL (FL)	Album
2025	"Niemand is bijzonder"	10	Gedoe
