= Meau =

Dutch singer-songwriter (born 2000)

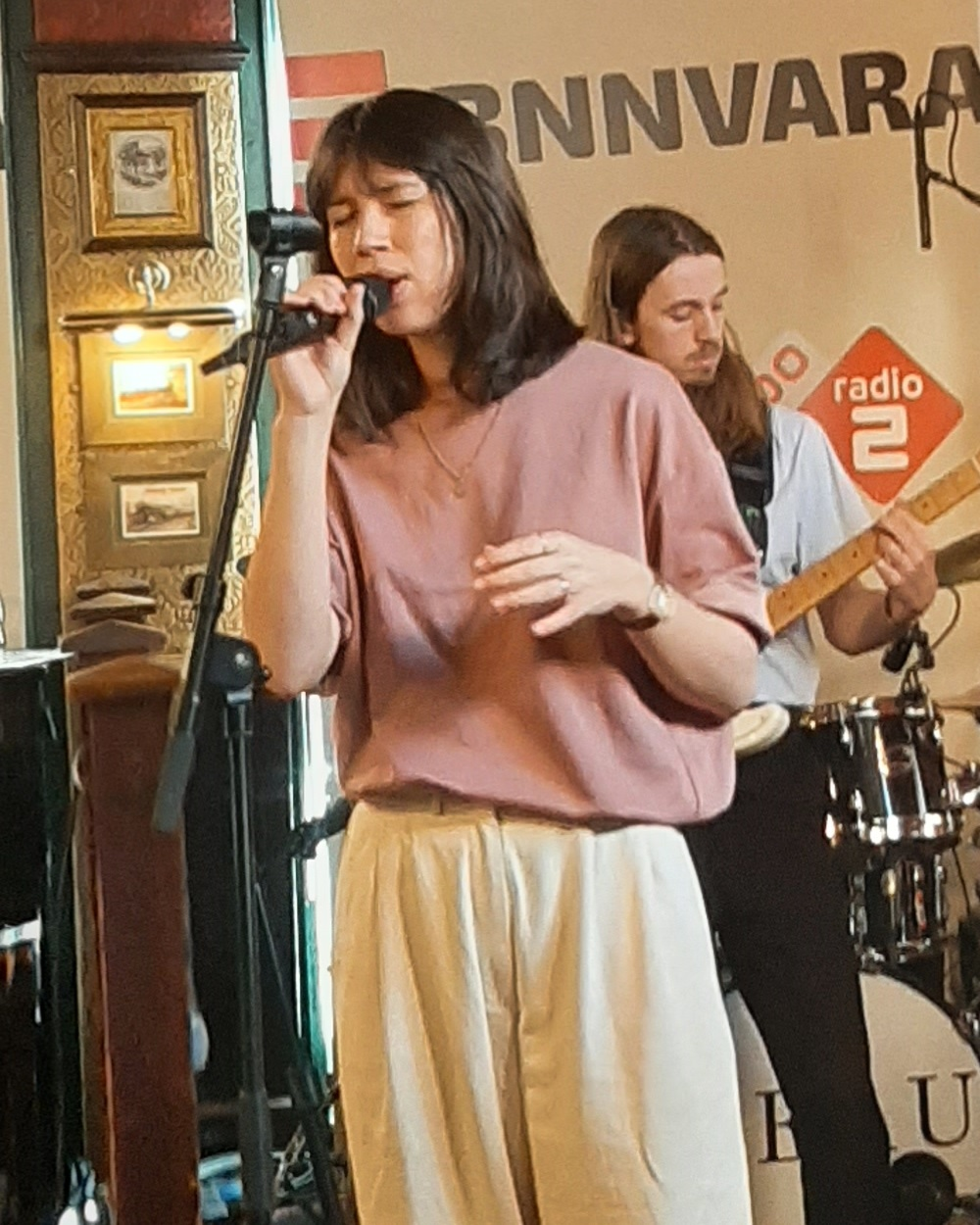
- Meau in April 2022

Background information
- Born: Meau Hewitt; 10 May 2000 (age 26); Blaricum, Netherlands
- Origin: Weesp, Netherlands
- Occupations: Singer; songwriter
- Instruments: Vocals; guitar
- Years active: 2020–present
- Label: Excited About Music
- Website: www.meauhewitt.nl

Meau Hewitt (born 10 May 2000), known mononymously as Meau (stylised in all caps), is a Dutch singer-songwriter from Weesp, North Holland.

Her 2022 song "Dat heb jij gedaan" was a number-one hit in the Netherlands.

== Early life ==
Meau Hewitt was born in Blaricum and grew up in Weesp. Her mother's family comes from Suriname and her ancestors on that side of the family were slaves on a plantation. Her Surinamese grandfather was also a musician, and played in the band Sonora Paranamera.

When she was eight years old, Meau performed in Kinderen voor Kinderen, a well known children's choir, from 2008 to 2011. In 2012 and 2013, Meau and her friend Alanis Blom tried for the Junior Songfestival, both solo and duet, though neither reached the finals. From 2013 to 2017, she went to Vechtstede College in Weesp. From 2018 to 2021, she completed her training at the Herman Brood Academie.

== Career ==
Meau's first song "Kalmte" was released in 2020. In September 2021, she released the single "Dat heb jij gedaan", written about the emotional abuse she suffered in a toxic relationship. At first she considered the subject matter unsuitable for radio, but it reached number one on the Dutch Top 40 for eight weeks in 2022. At the time, she worked as an employee at the Rijksmuseum, but she would quit because of her fame.

In June 2022, she released a song with Racoon, "Dans m'n ogen dicht". In May 2023, she released her debut album 22, which released number nine on the Dutch Albums Chart. It won an Edison Award for best Dutch-language release. She participated in season 16 of the reality show Beste Zangers, which aired beginning in September 2023.

In January 2024, she released the song "Stukje van mij" in collaboration with telecommunication company KPN, about the consequences of sexting and revenge porn. It became her second top ten hit, and the music video won the Grand Prix at the 2024 Cannes Lions awards. In October 2024, she released "Het midden", a collaboration with Belgian singer-actress Pommelien Thijs. It reached number one in Belgium (Flanders).

== Discography ==
=== Albums ===
Title	Release date	Peak chart positions	
Title	Release date	NLD	BEL (FL)
22	9 May 2023	9	70
Liefde onderschat	14 November 2025	40	40

=== EPs ===
Title	Release date
Kalmte	25 June 2021

=== Singles ===
List of singles, with selected chart positions
Title	Year	Peak chart positions			Album
Title	Year	NLD Dutch Top 40	NLD Single Top 100	BEL (FL)	Album
"Kalmte"	2020	—	—	—	Kalmte
"Weet"	2020	—	—	—	Kalmte
"Afgesloten"	2021	—	—	—	Kalmte
"Relativeren"	2021	—	—	—	Kalmte
"Dat heb jij gedaan"	2021	1	1	1	22
"Stap maar in bij mij" (with Paul de Munnik)	2022	—	—	—	Non-album single
"Als jij maar bij me bent"	2022	—	73	—	22
"Tegen de klippen op"	2022	—	—	—	Non-album single
"Dans m'n ogen dicht" (with Racoon)	2022	37	61	—	22
"Blijven rijden"	2022	36	53	—	22
"Avond"	2022	—	—	—	Non-album single
"Helen"	2023	—	—	—	22
"22"	2023	—	—	—	22
"Stukje van mij"	2024	7	9	45	Non-album singles
"Nergens liever"	2024	—	100	—	Non-album singles
"Het midden" (with Pommelien Thijs)	2024	17	33	1	Non-album singles
"Vergeef me"	2025	—	91	—	Non-album singles
"Een nacht als deze"	2025	—	—	23	Non-album singles
"Nog even blijven" (with Douwe Bob)	2025	5	12	15	Non-album singles

== Awards ==
- Edison Award 2022 for Best Newcomer

== See also ==
- List of Dutch Top 40 number-one singles of 2022
