= Jaap Reesema =

Dutch singer-songwriter

Jake Reese
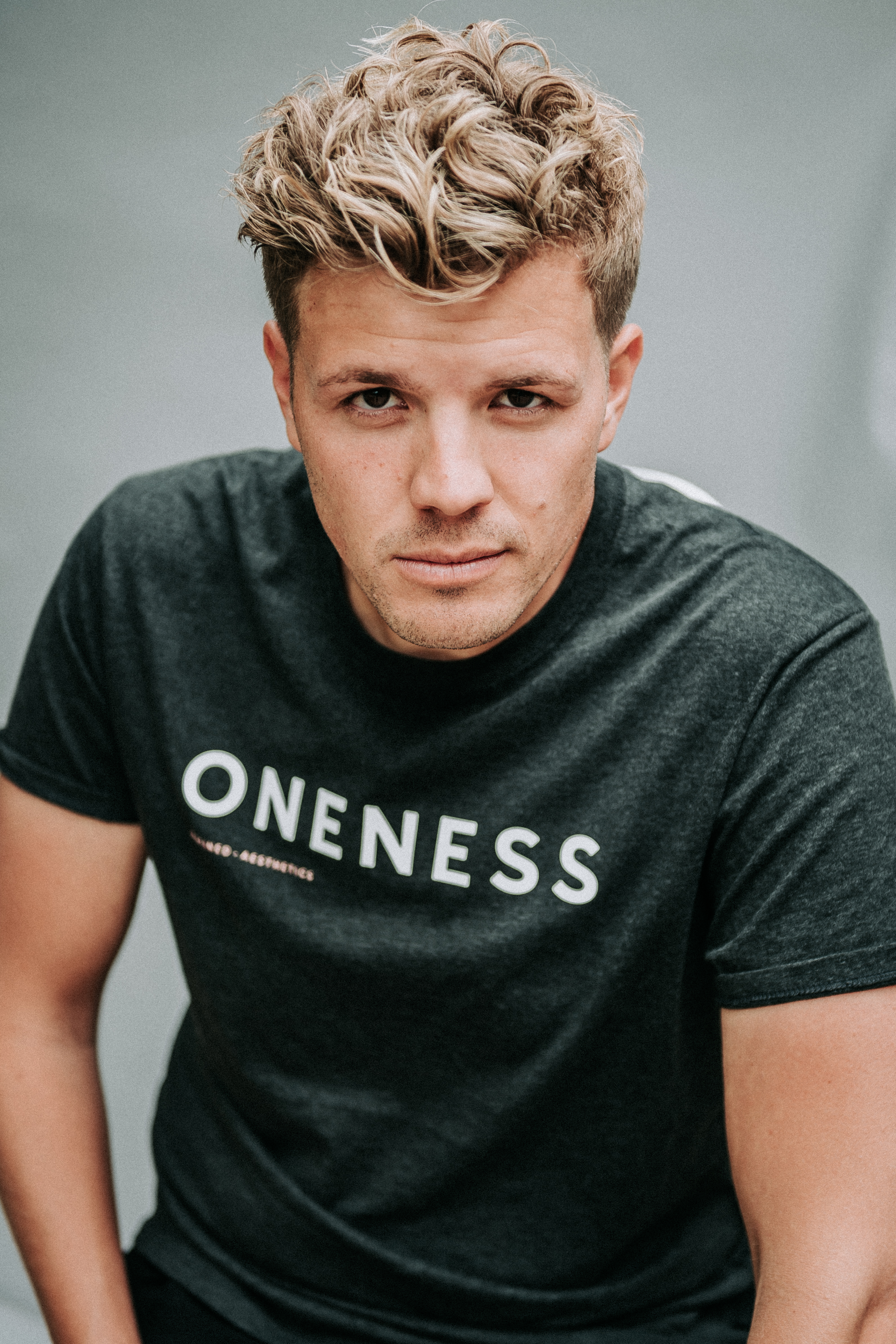
- Reesema in 2018

Background information
- Born: Jaap Siewertsz van Reesema; 28 October 1984 (age 41); Deventer, Netherlands
- Occupation: Singer-songwriter
- Partner: Kim Kötter

Jaap Siewertsz van Reesema (pronounced [jaːp ˈsiu.ərts fɑn ˈreːsəmaː]; born 28 October 1984), professionally known as simply Jaap Reesema or Jake Reese, is a Dutch singer-songwriter.

After winning the Dutch X Factor, Reesema collaborated with Hardwell on his singles "Run Wild" and "Mad World", for which he won the award for Best Vocal Performance at the 2015 IDMA's. He has also collaborated with Lost Frequencies, Hardwell & Jay Sean (as co-writer), David Guetta & Showtek (co-writer and singer), on the single "Your Love", KSHMR, on the single "Carry Me Home" (co-writer and singer), Brennan Heart, on the single "Lose It All", Sam Feldt, Topic, Lucas & Steve, Dash Berlin, Waka Flocka. In 2015 Jake wrote and sang the song "Day to Feel Alive" for the Ameriprise US campaign, which was also used as the opening song for the Anderson Cooper show on CNN for an entire season. For his solo project, Jake combined his dance background with the more raw/natural vibe of "Day to Feel Alive". His release "Ellie" with Belgium DJ Regi reached the number 1 spot for 7 weeks in Belgium.

In 2023, he was one of the team captains in the television game show DNA Singers. In August 2023, he was named one of the members of the selection committee for the Dutch entry to the Eurovision Song Contest 2024.

== Personal life ==
Jaap Reesema lives with his partner Kim Kötter, former Miss Universe Netherlands.

== Discography ==
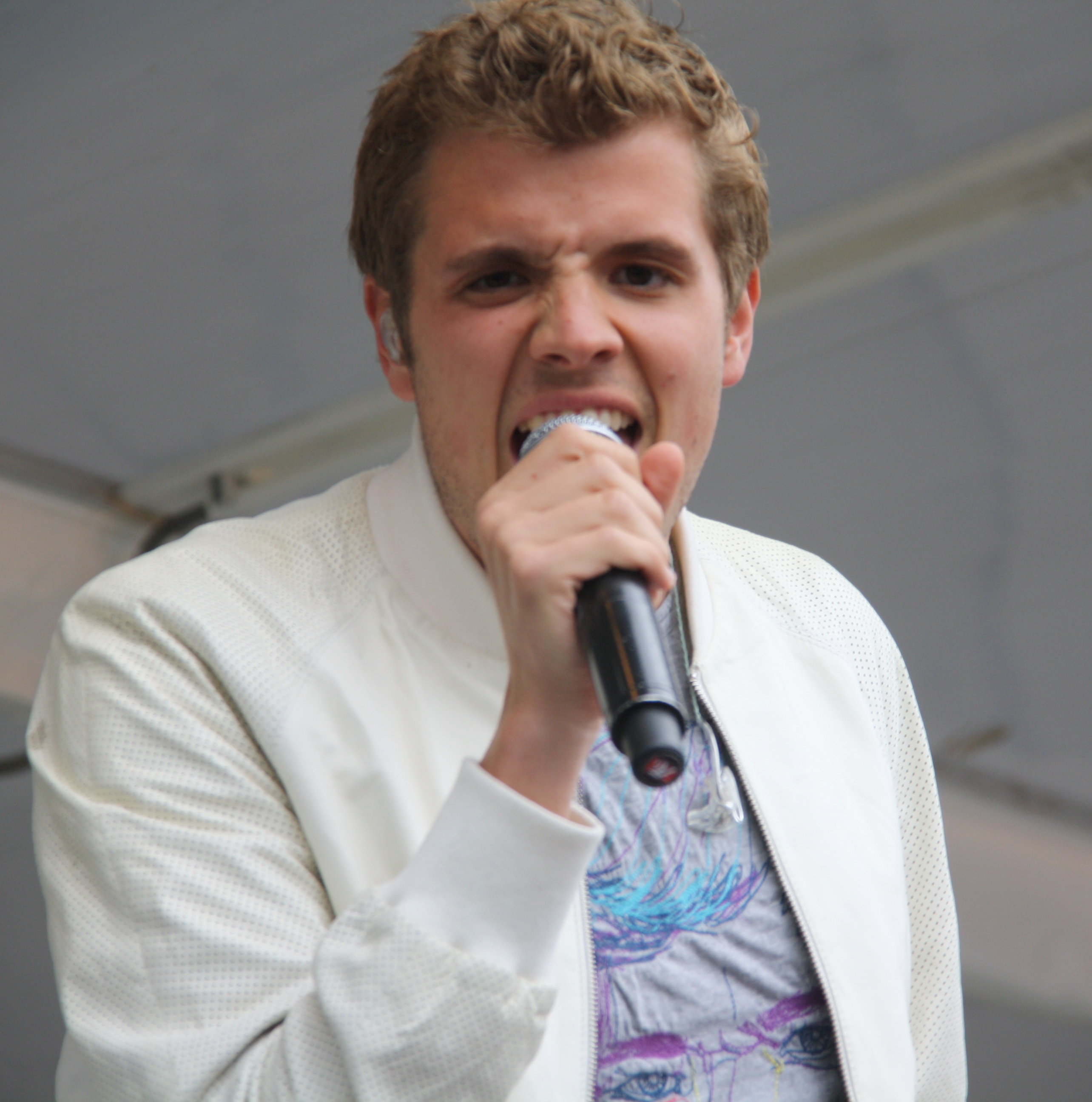
Reesema performing in 2010

=== Albums ===
Year	Album	Peak positions	
Year	Album	NED	BEL (Fl)
2011	Changing Man	47	—
2023	Als je voor me staat	1	1
2025	Sprakeloos	45	14

=== Singles ===
Credited as Jake Reese

Year	Single	Peak positions		Album
Year	Single	NED Single Top 100	NED Dutch Top 40	Album
2010	"You're the Voice" (with the Dutch "X Factor 2010")	2	30	
2010	"Don't Stop Believin'"	1	10	Changing Man
2010	"Walk to the Other Side"	62	14 (Tipparade)	Changing Man
2011	"Hoe hard je ook rent"	52	—	
2019	"Calling It Home"	—	9 (Tipparade)	

Credited as Jaap Reesema

Year	Single	Peak positions			Album
Year	Single	NED Single Top 100	NED Dutch Top 40	BEL (Fl)	Album
2020	"Nu wij niet meer praten" (with Pommelien Thijs)	2	1	1	Als je voor me staat
2021	"Alles komt goed"	31	22	15	Als je voor me staat
2021	"Voor je van me houdt"	77	30	43	Als je voor me staat
2022	"Mijn kleine presidentje"	39	29	1	Als je voor me staat
2022	"Code rood" (with Lea Rue)	—	—	12	Als je voor me staat
2022	"Grijs"	21	17	—	Als je voor me staat
2023	"Als je voor me staat"	tip5	—	23	Als je voor me staat
2023	"Papa"	—	—	33	Non-album singles
2023	"Maar 1 wens met kerstmis"	—	—	33	Non-album singles

=== Songs featured in ===
Year	Single	Peak positions			Album
Year	Single	NED Single Top 100	NED Dutch Top 40	BEL (Fl)	Album
2015	"Mad World" (Hardwell feat. Jake Reese)	78	1 (Tipparade)	37 (Ultratip)	
2016	"Run Wild" (Hardwell feat. Jake Reese)	–	3 (Tipparade)	–	
2017	"Calling on You" (Lucas & Steve feat. Jake Reese)	–	4 (Tipparade)	–	
2018	"Ellie" (Regi feat. Jake Reese)	–	–	1	
2019	"Summer Life" (Regi feat. Jake Reese & OT)	–	–	5	
2020	"Kom wat dichterbij" (Regi feat. Jake Reese & OT)	–	–	5	
2020	"Zo ver weg" (Regi feat. Jake Reese & OT)	–	–	26	
2020	"Need You Now" (Armin van Buuren feat. Jake Reese)	–	–	–	

=== Other songs ===
- David Guetta and Showtek – "Your Love"
- Hardwell feat. Jay Sean – "Thinking About You"
- Sam Feldt feat. Jake Reese – "Blackbird"
- Lost Frequencies feat. Jake Reese – "Sky Is the Limit"
- Topic feat. Jake Reese – "Find You"
- KSHMR feat. Jake Reese – "Carry Me Home"
- Dash Berlin and DBSTF feat. Jake Reese, Waka Flocka – "Gold"
- Jake Reese – "Day to Feel Alive"
- Brennan Heart feat. Jake Reese – "Lose It All"
- FAULHABER feat. Jake Reese – "Savannah"
- Scooter – "Encore"
- Chemical Surf feat. Jake Reese - “Summer Love”

== Awards ==
- X Factor winner 2010 (Netherlands)
- IDMA 2015 Best vocalist
- Ketnet award Best song of the Year 2018 - Regie feat. Jake Reese "Ellie"
