= Niels Destadsbader =

Belgian singer, actor and presenter

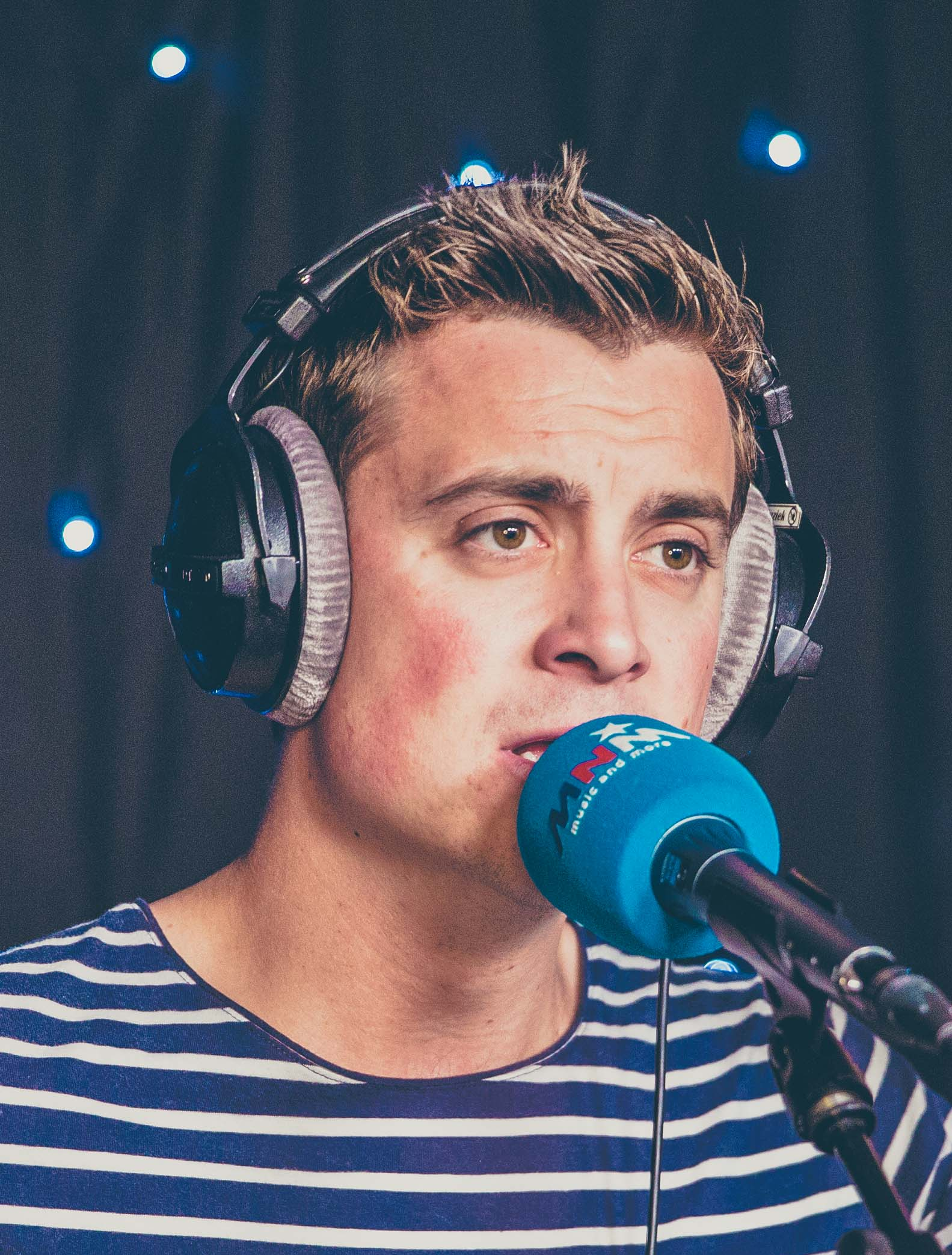
- Born: Niels Destadsbader; 19 August 1988 (age 38); Kortrijk, Belgium
- Occupations: Actor, television presenter, singer
- Height: 180 cm (5 ft 11 in)
- Website: http://www.nielsdestadsbader.be/

Niels Destadsbader (born 19 August 1988) is a Belgian singer, television presenter and actor.

== Biography ==
Niels Destadsbader had roles in several Belgian TV shows including Amika, De Elfenheuvel and F.C. De Kampioenen. Destadsbader presented many programs such as Dansdate, K3 zoekt K3, De Wensboom and many more. He released his debut album ‘Speeltijd’ on October 21, 2016.

In 2008 he participated in the competition ‘Steracteur Sterartiest’ and got to the semi-finals. He has performed at Werchter Boutique, won 9 MIA's as of 2020 and won the Radio 2 Zomerhit a total of 4 times.

In 2018 he appeared in the Belgian TV show ‘Liefde voor Muziek’. 5 of the songs he made for the show reached the Flemish Top 50.

== Discography ==
=== Albums ===
Year	Album	Peak positions	Certification
Year	Album	BEL (FL)	Certification
2016	Speeltijd	1	2× Platinum
2018	Dertig	1	2× Platinum
2019	Boven de wolken	1	Platinum
2021	Sterker	1	
2026	Zo kan het dus ook	1	

=== Singles ===
Year	Single	Peak positions	Certification	Album
2007	"Helden"	-		-
2007	"Ketnetkerstkriebels"	-		-
2009	"Jij bent van mij"	18		-
2009	"Zij is de liefde"	-		-
2011	"Vrij"	tip39		Speeltijd
2011	"Vannacht"	-		Speeltijd
2011	"Hou je me vast"	tip25		Speeltijd
2012	"Helemaal weg van jou"	tip30		Speeltijd
2014	"Move tegen pesten"	36		-
2014	"Groen"	tip77		Non-album single
2014	"Dansen"	tip9		Speeltijd
2015	"Hey Pa"	17		Speeltijd
2016	"Vandaag"	tip2		Speeltijd
2016	"Speeltijd"	37		Speeltijd
2016	"Een beetje anders" (Niels & Wiels)	22		Speeltijd
2017	"Skwon Meiske" (Niels & Wiels)	21		Speeltijd
2017	"Sara"	44		Speeltijd
2017	"Tranen Met Tuiten"	tip2		Dertig
2018	"Verover mij"	4	Gold	Dertig
2018	"Ik ben van 't stroate"	35		Dertig
2018	"Paradijs"	50		Dertig
2018	"Tokio"	tip		Dertig
2018	"Als je gaat"	tip		Dertig
2018	"Gloria"	38		Dertig
2018	"Vlinders in haar buik"	44		Dertig
2019	"Door jou"	tip1		Non-album single
2019	"Mee naar boven"	22	Gold	Boven de wolken
2019	"Annelies"	30		Boven de wolken
2019	"Wat zou ik zonder jou"	29		Boven de wolken
2020	"Nooit alleen"	9	Gold	Sterker
2020	"Als de muren konden praten"	—		Non-album single
2020	"Hoofd op m'n schouder"	33		Boven de wolken
2021	"De wereld draait voor jou"	1		Sterker
2021	"Sterker"	30		Sterker
2022	"Ik neem er een"	18		Non-album single
2023	"Liefs voor later" (with Kenny B)	17		Zoe kan het dus ook
2025	"Bijna vergeten" (with Tessa June)	46		Zoe kan het dus ook
2025	"Bij jou voel ik me thuis" (with Maksim)	40		Zoe kan het dus ook
2026	"Vuur en vlam"	39		Zoe kan het dus ook
2026	"Onderweg"	30		Zoe kan het dus ook
