= Stan Van Samang =

Belgian actor and singer (born 1979)

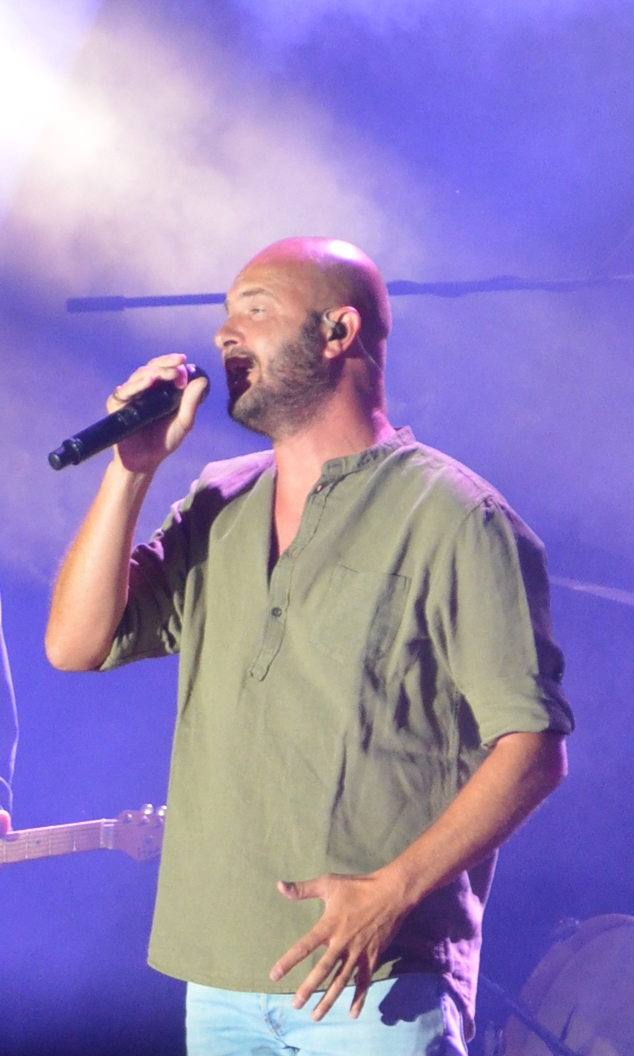
- Stan Van Samang in 2024
- Born: 19 March 1979 (age 47); Wijgmaal, Leuven, Belgium
- Other name: Stan Van Impe
- Occupations: Actor; voice actor; singer

Stan Van Samang (born 19 March 1979) is a Belgian actor and singer.

== Career ==
He played the role of 'Kevin De Kesel' in one of Flanders' famous soaps called Wittekerke (2001–2008). He appeared in the Belgian movies Windkracht 10: Koksijde Rescue (Hans Herbots, 2007) and as Steve Van Hamel in Vermist (Jan Verheyen, 2007), a role he reprised in the television series of the same name (2008–2016). Van Samang appeared in other Flemish TV series such as Flikken (2003), Rupel (2004), Witse (2008) and had supporting roles in David (2009–2010) and in Amika (2010–2011). More recently he sang the title song Hemel voor ons twee of the VTM soap opera Familie and he played Ben De Schutter in the VRT 1-tragicomedy Zie mij graag (2017–2020) and Harry Peeters in the VRT 1 soap opera Thuis (2020–2023).

In 2006, he was discovered as a music talent during the national TV shows Steracteur Sterartiest (VRT), a show in which actors sang for charity. The winner of the shows earned money for that charity.

Stan Van Samang won and got a record deal a few weeks later. On 7 March 2007 he made a record deal with EMI Group. He released his debut album Welcome Home on 23 November 2007. The album is produced by Eric Melaerts (Clouseau, Soulsister). The hit single "Scars" reached No. 1 for 5 weeks in the national Ultratop 50. The single was awarded a gold record.

== Discography ==
=== Studio albums ===
Year	Album	Peak positions	Certification
Year	Album	BEL (Fl)	Certification
2007	Welcome Home	3	Platinum
2009	Take it from Me	5	
2011	King in My Head	7	
2011	Stan Van Vrijdag	46	
2015	Liefde voor publiek	1	5× Platinum
2016	Stan Van Samang	1	Platinum
2017	10	3	Gold
2021	Feel the Power	1	
2022	15	7	
2024	Uit liefde voor muziek	4	
2024	Vadertaal	1	

=== Singles ===
Year	Single	Peak positions		Certification	Album
Year	Single	BEL (Fl)	BEL (Fl) Ultratip	Certification	Album
2007	"Scars"	1		Gold	Welcome Home
2007	"Poison"	11			Welcome Home
2008	"Siren"	16			Welcome Home
2008	"Welcome Home	–	15		Welcome Home
2008	"This Time"	43			Take it from Me
2009	"I Didn't Know"	38			Take it from Me
2009	"Brand New Start"	–			Take it from Me
2010	"Hang On" (with Regi)	10			
2011	"King in My Head"	–	3		King in My Head
2011	"Free"	–	22		King in My Head
2011	"Stand My Ground"	–	19		
2011	"Alles is liefde"	–	25		
2011	"All in My Head"	–	24		King in My Head
2012	"Zijn we alleen" (with Laura Omloop)	–	58		
2012	"One for the Road"	–	28		
2013	"De eerste sneeuw"	–	75		
2014	"Junbug"	8			
2015	"Fix You" (featuring Lisa)	4			
2016	"Candy"	43			
2017	"Little Moon Rises" (featuring Sarah Bettens)	27			
2017	"The Load"	49			
2017	"Hemel voor ons twee"	31			
2020	"River of Life"	27			
2021	"Snow"	43			
2022	"Alles"	50			
2023	"Feest"	23			

Featured in

Year	Single	Peak positions	Album
Year	Single	BEL (Fl)	Album
2010	"Is It Over You" (Owen featuring Stan Van Samang)	–	8

== Filmography ==
TV series
Title	Role	Year	TV channel	Episodes	Type of program
Leading roles
Wittekerke	Kevin De Kesel	2001–2008	VTM	Season 8–15	soap opera
Vermist	Steve Van Hamel	2008–2016	Play4	70 episodes (all seasons)	police crime drama
Zuidflank	Rob Vandenbergh	2013	VTM	13 episodes	drama
Zie mij graag	Ben De Schutter	2017–2020	VRT 1	40 episodes (including Christmas special)	tragicomedy
Thuis	Harry Peeters	2020–2023	VRT 1	episodes 4923–5432 (S26–28)	soap opera
Assisen Online 3 - De Wraakmoord - Online theaterstuk	Geert De Ridder	2021	/	/	/
3Hz	Thomas	2021–2023	Ketnet	33 episodes (all seasons)	adventure -mystery
Supporting and guest roles
Wittekerke	Bingospeler	2000	VTM	Season 7: Episode 68	soap opera
Flikken	Bart Van Den Wijngaert	2003	VRT 1	S5 E12: Aan de waterkant (1) (E64) S5 E13: Aan de waterkant (2) (E65)	police crime drama
Sedes & Belli	Klant bij dealer	2003	VRT 1	S2 E1: Overstag (E14)	police crime drama
Rupel	Dennis Decraene	2004	VTM	S1 E13: De kroon (E13)	police crime drama
Willy's en marjetten	/	2006	VRT 1	Episode 1	comedy
Witse	Tom van Hoydonck	2008	VRT 1	S5 E9: Corvette (E61)	police crime drama
David	Steven Verhoett	2009–2010	VTM	Supporting role	telenovelle
Dag & Nacht: Hotel Eburon	Guillaume	2010	VTM	Episode 1	drama
Zone Stad	Mario	2010	VTM	S5 E3: De laatste ronde (E55)	police crime drama
Aspe	Kristof Landuyt	2010	VTM	S6 E11: Zwijgplicht (E73)	police crime drama
Amika	Vincent Vos	2010–2011	Ketnet	Supporting role (S3)	children - telenovelle
Code 37	Frank Van Laere	2011	VTM	S2 E7: Razernij (E20)	police crime drama
De Bunker	Koen Verachtert	2015	VTM	S1 E6: Heimat (E6)	drama
Allemaal Chris	Himself	2017	VTM	/	comedy
Other work
Wittekerke	singer of the title song (2007–2008)		VTM	S15	soap opera
Familie	singer of the title song: Hemel voor ons twee (2017–2019)		VTM	S27–29	soap opera

Movies
Title	Role	Year	Other information
Buitenspel	Trainer van ploeg Gilles	2005	directed by Jan Verheyen, Belgian remake of In Orange
Windkracht 10: Koksijde Rescue (EN: Stormforce)	Serge Helsen	2006	follow-up of TV series Windkracht 10
Vermist (film)	Steve Van Hamel	2007	directed by Jan Verheyen, pilot of TV series Vermist

== Dubbing roles ==
=== Animated films ===
- Ratatouille - Linguini (2007)
- The Princess and the Frog - Prince Naveen (2009)
- A Monster in Paris - Francoeur (2011)
- Wreck-It Ralph - Mr. Litwak and Wynnchel (2012)
- Rio 2 - Roberto (2014)
- Ralph Breaks the Internet - Mr. Litwak (2018)

== Awards and nominations ==
=== Awards ===
- TOTZ-trofee (2007, VTM)
- Award for best performer (2007, Radio 2 Zomerhit)
- Spetter of the year (2007, Ketnet)

=== Nominations ===
TMF Awards

- Award for best up-coming artist (2007)
- Award for best pop artist (2007)
- Award for best male artist (2007)
