= Umoja =

Umoja, the Swahili word for "unity", is the first of the Seven Principles (Nguzo Saba) celebrated each day during Kwanzaa.

It may also refer to:

== Places ==
- Umoja, Kenya, an all-female village founded on the principles of women's rights
- Umoja, Nairobi, a suburb of Nairobi, the capital of Kenya
- Umoja Village, a former shanty town in the Liberty City neighborhood of Miami, Florida

== People ==
- Akinyele Umoja (born 1954), American educator and author

== Arts ==
- Umoja: The Village Where Men Are Forbidden, a 2008 French documentary about Umoja, Kenya
- Umoja, a music album released in 2006 by Dutch pop band BLØF
- Umoja: Anthem for Unity, an instrumental work by Valerie Coleman
- Umoja, the Ancient Name of Mualani, a character in 2020 video game Genshin Impact

== Politics ==
- Umoja Party, a political party active in Washington, D.C., from 1994 to 2000

== Transport ==
- MV Umoja, a ferry used on Lake Victoria, East Africa
- Umoja, an East African Railways locomotive

== Other ==
- Umoja Karamu, an African-American celebration
- Operation Umoja Wetu, the name for the 2009 Eastern Congo offensive
- Umoja (software), enterprise resource planning software used by the United Nations
- Umoja (network), an undersea cable connecting Kenya to Australia
