= Bløf discography =

BLØF discography
- Studio albums: 14
- EPs: 2
- Live albums: 12
- Compilation albums: 3
- Singles: 45
- Video albums: 5

As of 2019, the discography of Dutch pop-rock group BLØF consists of 14 studio albums, 12 live albums, 3 compilation albums, 5 DVDs/Blu-rays, 45 singles, and 2 EPs.

== Albums ==
=== Studio albums ===
Year	Title
1995	Naakt onder de hemel (nl)
1997	Helder (nl)
1999	Boven (nl)
2000	Watermakers (nl)
2002	Blauwe Ruis (nl)
2003	Omarm (nl)
2006	Umoja
2008	Oktober (nl)
2009	April (nl)
2011	Alles Blijft Anders (nl)
2014	In Het Midden van Alles
2015	De Grasbroek Sessies
2017	Aan (nl)
2022	Polaroid

=== Compilations ===
Year	Title
2005	Het Eind Van Het Begin (nl)
2007	Platinum (nl)
2012	Hier - Het Beste Van 20 Jaar BLØF (nl)

=== Live albums ===
Year	Title
1998	XXL Live Met Het Zeeuwse Orkest (nl)
2001	Oog in Oog - Live in Ahoy (nl)
2002	Tussen nacht en morgen - Live met het Metropole Orkest (bonus CD with "Blauwe ruis")
2004	Live 2004
2005	Tussen schemer en avond - Live met het Metropole Orkest
2006	XXS (nl)
2007	Een Manier Om Thuis Te Komen: Umoja Live
2009	XXS 2 (nl)
2010	De Toegift
2014	XXS 3
2014	Open Je Ogen EP (Live at Concert at SEA 2014)
2015	Live – Concert at SEA 10 (Live at Concert at SEA 2015)

== EPs ==
Year	Title
2011	Radio Berlijn (nl)
2014	Open Je Ogen (Live op Concert at SEA 2014)

== Singles ==
Year	Song	Dutch Top 40	Album
1998	"Liefs uit Londen" (Greetings from London)	13	Helder
1998	"Aan de kust" (At the coast)	27	Naakt onder de hemel
1998	"Wat zou je doen" (What would you do)	5	Naakt onder de hemel
1999	"Harder dan ik hebben kan" (Harder than I can take)	11	Boven
1999	"Niets dan dit" (Nothing more than this)	--	Boven
1999	"Zaterdag" (Saturday)	--	Boven
1999	"Eén dag op de grens" (One day at the border)	--	Boven
2000	"Dansen aan zee" (Dancing at sea)	9	Watermakers
2000	"Hier" (Here)	15	Watermakers
2001	"Ze is er niet" (She's not there)	33	Watermakers
2001	"Dichterbij dan ooit" (Closer than ever)	12	Blauwe ruis
2002	"Blauwe ruis" (Blue noise)	36	Blauwe ruis
2002	"Mooie dag" (Beautiful day)	17	Blauwe ruis
2002	"Meer van jou" (More from you)	--	Blauwe ruis
2003	"Omarm" (Embrace)	8	Omarm
2003	"Misschien niet de eeuwigheid" (Maybe not eternity)	39	Omarm
2003	"Barcelona"	--	Omarm
2004	"Hart tegen hart" (Heart to heart)	32	Omarm
2004	"Holiday in Spain" (with Counting Crows)	1	Hard Candy
2004	"Opstand" (Insurrection)	13	Het einde van het begin
2005	"Dat wij dat zijn" (That we are them)	25	Omarm
2006	"Aanzoek zonder ringen" (Proposal without rings)	2	Umoja
2006	"Hemingway"	8	Umoja
2006	"Mens" (Human)	10	Umoja
2006	"Een manier om thuis te komen" (A way to get home)	5	Umoja
2007	"Donker hart" (Dark heart)	8	Een manier om thuis te komen: Umoja live
2007	"Alles is liefde" (Everything is love)	2	Alles Is Liefde OST
2008	"Oktober" (October)	7	Oktober
2008	"Vallende engel" (Falling angel)	28	Oktober
2009	"Vandaag" (Today)	7	April
2009	"Midzomernacht" (Midsummer night)	22*	April
2009	"De Storm (Geef niet op)" (The Storm (Don't give up))	16	De Storm - Original Motion Picture Soundtrack
2010	"Wijd Open" (Open wide)	29	theme of Serious Request 2010
2011	"Beter" (Better)	13	Alles Is Anders
2011	"Hou vol hou vast" (Hold on hold steady)	25	Alles Is Anders
2011	"Was je maar hier" (Wish you were here)	23	Alles Is Anders
2011	"Meer kan het niet zijn" (Cannot be more) with Sabrina Starke	13	Alles Is Anders
2012	"Later als ik groot ben" (Later when I'm bigger)	25	Hier – Het Beste van 20 Jaar BLØF
2012	"Zo Stil" (So Silent)	17	Hier – Het Beste van 20 Jaar BLØF
2013	"Mannenharten" (Men's Hearts) with Nielson	10	Mannenharten - Original Motion Picture Soundtrack
2014	"Spijt Heb Je Morgen Maar" (Leave Regrets For Tomorrow)	37	In Het Midden Van Alles
2014	"Open Je Ogen" (Open Your Eyes)	--	In Het Midden Van Alles
2014	"Klaar Voor" (Ready for It)	--	In Het Midden Van Alles
2017	"Zoutelande" featuring Geike Arnaert	1	Aan
2018	"Zachtjes Zingen" (Softly Singing)	23	Aan
2021	"Horizon"	30	Polaroid

== DVDs ==
Year	Title
1998	Tussen Nacht en Morgen: Live Met Het Metropole Orkest
2004	Live 2004
2005	Tussen Schemer en Avond: Live Met Het Metropole Orkest
2007	Beste Clips & Documentaires
2007	Een Manier Om Thuis Te Komen
