= Black Girls Rock! =

BLACK GIRLS ROCK!
- Country: United States
- First award: 2006
- Website: www.blackgirlsrock.com

Television/radio coverage
- Network: BGR!TV NETWORKS

BLACK GIRLS ROCK! is a company founded by executive producer, businesswoman, celebrity DJ, and former model Beverly Bond. The company hosts an annual award show of the same name that honors and promotes Black women's achievements. BLACK GIRLS ROCK! also has a nonprofit arm that teaches leadership skills and develops confidence in teenage girls through its annual "BLACK GIRLS LEAD" conference.

== History ==
BLACK GIRLS ROCK! was founded by celebrity DJ and model Beverly Bond in 2006. The inaugural BLACK GIRLS ROCK! AWARDS ceremony honored rapper MC Lyte and DJ Jazzy Joyce at powerHouse Arena, an art gallery and powerHouse Books location in DUMBO, Brooklyn. For the second annual BLACK GIRLS ROCK! Awards the organization honored Missy Elliott, Sylvia Rhone, and DJ Diamond Kuts at Jazz at Lincoln Center in New York City with actress Regina King as its host. The organization continued to independently produce its annual award show in New York City until 2009. In 2008 Regina King hosted the award show again and in 2009 the award show was co-hosted by Regina King and Tracee Ellis Ross.

In 2010 BLACK GIRLS ROCK! collaborated with BET to bring its annual award ceremony to television. The award show aired on BET from 2010 through 2019. In 2021, Beverly Bond, launched BGR!TV Networks, which streams original content celebrating Black women and girls including the BLACK GIRLS ROCK! Awards. The BGR!TV Networks first program was the BLACK GIRLS ROCK! 15th-anniversary Fundraising Gala which was headlined by Chaka Khan and featured Grammy-nominated artists Alice Smith and Maimouna Youssef, a.k.a. MuMu Fresh; D.C.'s all-woman go-go band Bela Dona; Grammy Award-winning gospel singer Tasha Cobbs Leonard; celebrity DJ Active; and an exclusive collaboration with Chaka Khan and Def Leppard lead guitarist Phil Collen.

In 2019, in collaboration with the John F. Kennedy Center for the Performing Arts in Washington, DC, BLACK GIRLS ROCK! hosted BGR!Fest. The three-day celebration was timed to coincide with International Women's Day, and included a dance party and a weekend of music performances. A second BGR!Fest was held in 2020, The Kennedy Center announced that the BGR!FEST will return in March 2022 and BLACK GIRLS ROCK! is currently collaborating with the National Symphony Orchestra to produce another event at the John F. Kennedy Center for the Performing Arts.

BLACK GIRLS ROCK! also holds an annual BLACK GIRLS LEAD conference for girls and hosts educational STEM programs through its platform Girls Rock Tech!

== Award Show ==
Each year, BLACK GIRLS ROCK! celebrants are recognized in categories including, but not limited to, "The Rock Star", "Social Humanitarian", "Who Got Next?", "Living Legend", "Shot Caller", "Trailblazer", "Motivator", "Young, Gifted & Black", "Star Power", "Icon" or "Visionary" award. The program features musical performances by female recording artists in the R&B and Soul music genres. Notable speakers have included Michelle Obama (2015) and Hillary Clinton (2016).

Since its first televised ceremony on Nov 7, 2010, Black Girls Rock! has become an annually televised event on BET and BET Her. That year the ceremony was hosted by actress Nia Long and featured recognitions and musical performances by SWV, Coko, Raven-Symoné, Keke Palmer, Ruby Dee, Teresa Clarke, Marcelite J. Harris, Iyanla Vanzant, Kelly Price, VV Brown, Keyshia Cole, Marsha Ambrosius, Jill Scott, Ledisi, Keri Hilson, Ciara, and Missy Elliott.

The 2013 show garnered over 2.7 million television viewers. Since 2015, the annual ceremony has been produced from Newark's New Jersey Performing Arts Center.

The 2019 event was hosted by actress Niecy Nash on August 25, 2019 and aired on September 8, 2019 on BET.

The award show has won the NAACP Image Award for Outstanding Variety in the Series of Special category three times (2013, 2017, 2019) and been nominated five times.

=== Honorees ===
==== 2006 ====
- Pioneer Award – DJ Jazzy Joyce
- Icon Award – MC Lyte

==== 2007 ====
- Creative Visionary Award – Missy Elliott
- DJ Jazzy Joyce Award – DJ Diamond Cuts
- Corporate Award – Sylvia Rhone

==== 2008 ====
- Rock Star Award – Erykah Badu
- Monument Award – Nicole Paultre-Bell and Valerie Bell
- Shot Caller Award – Bethann Hardison
- Fashionista Award – June Ambrose
- Living Legend Award – Pam Grier
- Social Humanitarian Award – Iman
- Become Legendary Award – April Holmes
- Soul Sister Award – Keyshia Cole

==== 2009 ====
- Community Service Award – Dr. Mehret Mandefro
- Fashionista Award – Naomi Campbell
- Who Got Next Award – Janelle Monáe
- Jazzy Joyce DJ Award – Spinderella
- Young, Gifted and Black Award – Raven-Symoné
- Living Legend Award – Dr. Sonia Sanchez
- Shot Caller Award – Iyanla Vanzant
- Rock Star Award – Queen Latifah
- Icon Award – Mary J. Blige

==== 2010 ====
- Young, Gifted & Black Award – Raven-Symoné
- Visionary Award – Missy Elliott
- Who Got Next? Award – Keke Palmer
- Shot Caller Award – Teresa Clarke
- Living Legend Award – Ruby Dee
- Trailblazer Award – Major General Marcelite J. Harris
- Motivator Award – Rev. Dr. Iyanla Vanzant

==== 2011 ====
- Young, Black & Gifted Award – Tatyana Ali
- Star Power Award – Taraji P. Henson
- Shot Caller Award – Laurel J. Richie
- Living Legend Award – Shirley Caesar
- Icon Award – Angela Davis
- Trailblazer Awards – Imani Walker and Malika Saada Saar

==== 2012 ====
- Rock Star Award – Alicia Keys
- Young Gifted and Black Award – Janelle Monáe
- Star Power Award – Kerry Washington
- Living Legend Award – Dionne Warwick
- Inspiration Award – Susan L. Taylor
- Social Humanitarian Award – Dr. Hawa Abdi, Dr. Deqo Mohamed and Dr. Amina Mohamed

==== 2013 ====
- Rock Star Award – Queen Latifah
- Young, Gifted & Black Award – Misty Copeland
- Star Power Award – Venus Williams
- Living Legend Award – Patti LaBelle
- Social Humanitarian Award – Marian Wright Edelman
- Community Activist Award – Ameena Matthews

==== 2015 ====
- Rock Star Award – Erykah Badu
- Shot Caller Award – Ava DuVernay
- Star Power Award – Jada Pinkett Smith
- Living Legend Award – Cicely Tyson
- Social Humanitarian Award – Dr. Helene D. Gayle
- Change Agent Award – Nadia Lopez

==== 2016 ====
- Rock Star Celebrant – Rihanna
- Shot Caller Celebrant – Shonda Rhimes
- Young, Gifted and Black Celebrant – Amandla Stenberg
- Star Power Celebrant – Danai Gurira
- Living Legend Celebrant – Gladys Knight
- Community Change Agent Celebrants – Alicia Garza, Patrisse Cullors and Opal Tometi

==== 2017 ====
- Rock Star Celebrant – Solange
- Shot Caller Celebrant – Suzanne Shank
- Social Humanitarian Celebrant – Maxine Waters
- Star Power Celebrant – Issa Rae
- Living Legend Celebrant – Roberta Flack
- Community Change Agent Celebrants – Natalie and Derrica Wilson
- Young Gifted And Black Celebrant – Yara Shahidi

==== 2018 ====
- Rock Star Celebrant – Janet Jackson
- Star Power Award – Mary J Blige
- Living Legend Award – Judith Jamison
- Black Girl Magic – Naomi Campbell
- Shot Caller Award – Lena Waithe
- Community Change Agent Award – Tarana Burke

==== 2019 ====
- Icon Award – Angela Bassett
- Star Power Award – Regina King
- Rock Star Award – Ciara
- Young, Gifted & Black Award – H.E.R.
- Shot Caller Award – Debra Martin Chase
- Community Change Agent Award – Gwen Carr, Lucy McBath, Geneva Reed-Veal, Cleopatra Cowley-Pendleton, Maria Hamilton, Sybrina Fulton

== 2018 Book: Black Girls Rock! Owning Our Magic. Rocking Our Truth. ==
In February 2018, Simon & Schuster published Black Girls Rock! Owning Our Magic. Rocking Our Truth. The book was edited by Beverly Bond and features insights from nearly sixty influential Black women, including Michelle Obama, Angela Davis, Shonda Rhimes, Misty Copeland, Yara Shahidi, and Mary J. Blige.
