= Tina Brown =

English and American journalist (born 1953)

Tina Brown CBE
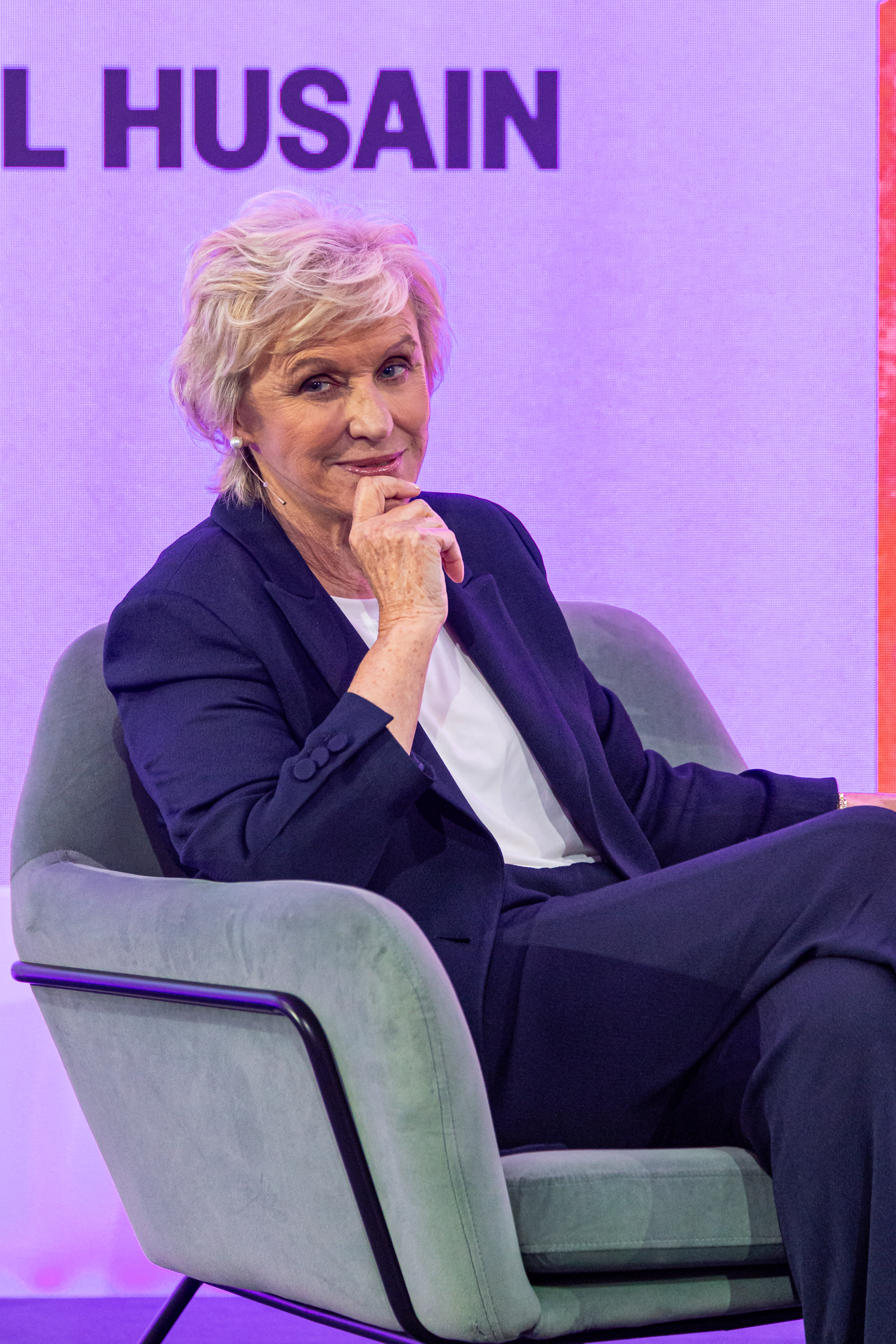
- Born: Christina Hambley Brown; 21 November 1953 (age 73); Maidenhead, Berkshire, England
- Education: St Anne's College, Oxford
- Occupations: Journalist, magazine editor, columnist, talk-show host, author
- Spouse: Harold Evans (m. 1981; died 2020)
- Children: 2

Christina Hambley Brown, Lady Evans (born 21 November 1953), is an English and American journalist, magazine editor, columnist, broadcaster, and author. She is the former editor in chief of Tatler (1979–1982), Vanity Fair (1984–1992), The New Yorker (1992–1998), and the founding editor in chief of The Daily Beast (2008–2013). From 1998–2002, Brown was chairman of Talk Media, which included Talk magazine and Talk Miramax Books. In 2010, she founded Women in the World, a live journalism platform to elevate the voices of women globally, with summits held through 2019. Brown is author of The Diana Chronicles (2007), The Vanity Fair Diaries (2017) and The Palace Papers (2022).

As a magazine editor, she has received four George Polk Awards, five Overseas Press Club awards, and ten National Magazine Awards, and in 2007 was inducted into the Magazine Editors' Hall of Fame. In 2021, she was honored as a Library Lion by the New York Public Library. In 2022, Women in Journalism, the UK's leading networking and training organization for journalists, honored her with their Lifetime Achievement Award.

Brown emigrated from her native England to the United States in 1984, and became a U.S. citizen in 2005. In 2000, she was appointed a CBE (Commander of the Order of the British Empire), for her services to journalism overseas, by Queen Elizabeth II.

== Early life and education ==
Brown was born in Maidenhead, Berkshire, England, and grew up in the village of Little Marlow, in Buckinghamshire. Her father, George Hambley Brown, worked in the British film industry producing the Miss Marple detective films starring Margaret Rutherford. Her mother, Bettina Kohr, who married George Brown in 1948, was an executive assistant to actor Laurence Olivier on his first two Shakespeare films. Brown's elder brother, Christopher Hambley Brown, became a film producer.

Brown was considered "an extremely subversive influence" as a child, resulting in her expulsion from three boarding schools.

Brown studied at the University of Oxford from the age of 17. She studied at St Anne's College, and graduated with a BA in English Literature. As an undergraduate, she wrote for Isis, the university's literary magazine, to which she contributed interviews with the journalist Auberon Waugh and the actor Dudley Moore, and for the New Statesman. Her irreverent article about an invitation from Waugh to a Private Eye magazine lunch caught the eye of New Statesman editor Anthony Howard, who offered her an Oxford column.

While still at Oxford, she won The Sunday Times National Student Drama Award for her one-act play Under the Bamboo Tree, which was performed at the Bush Theatre and the Edinburgh Festival. A subsequent play, Happy Yellow, was mounted at the London fringe Bush Theatre in 1977 and was later performed at the Royal Academy of Dramatic Art.

== Career ==
=== Punch ===
After graduating from Oxford, Brown was invited to write a weekly column for the literary humor magazine Punch. These articles and her freelance contributions to The Sunday Times and The Sunday Telegraph earned her the Catherine Pakenham Award for the best journalist under 25. Some of the writings from this era formed part of her first collection Loose Talk, published by Michael Joseph.

=== Tatler ===
In 1979, Brown was invited to edit Tatler by its new owner, the Australian real estate millionaire Gary Bogard. During her tenure, she turned the society magazine into a successful modern glossy magazine with covers by celebrated photographers Norman Parkinson, Helmut Newton, and David Bailey, and fashion by Michael Roberts. Tatler featured writers from Brown's circle, including Julian Barnes, Dennis Potter, Auberon Waugh, Brian Sewell, Martin Amis, Georgina Howell (whom Brown appointed deputy editor), and Nicholas Coleridge. She transformed the social coverage with pictures by her young discovery Dafydd Jones. Brown wrote content for every issue, contributing sharp surveys of the upper classes. She traveled through Scotland for a feature titled "North of the Border with the Thane of Cawdor" and wrote short satirical profiles of eligible London bachelors under the pen name Rosie Boot.

Tatler covered the emergence of Lady Diana Spencer, soon to become Princess of Wales. Brown joined NBC's Tom Brokaw in running commentary for The Today Show on the royal wedding on 29 July 1981. Tatler's circulation increased from 10,000 to 40,000. In 1982, when Samuel Irving Newhouse Jr., owner of Condé Nast Publications, bought Tatler, Brown resigned to resume full-time writing. She also hosted several 1982 episodes of the long-running BBC1 film review television series Film ... as a guest presenter.

=== Vanity Fair ===
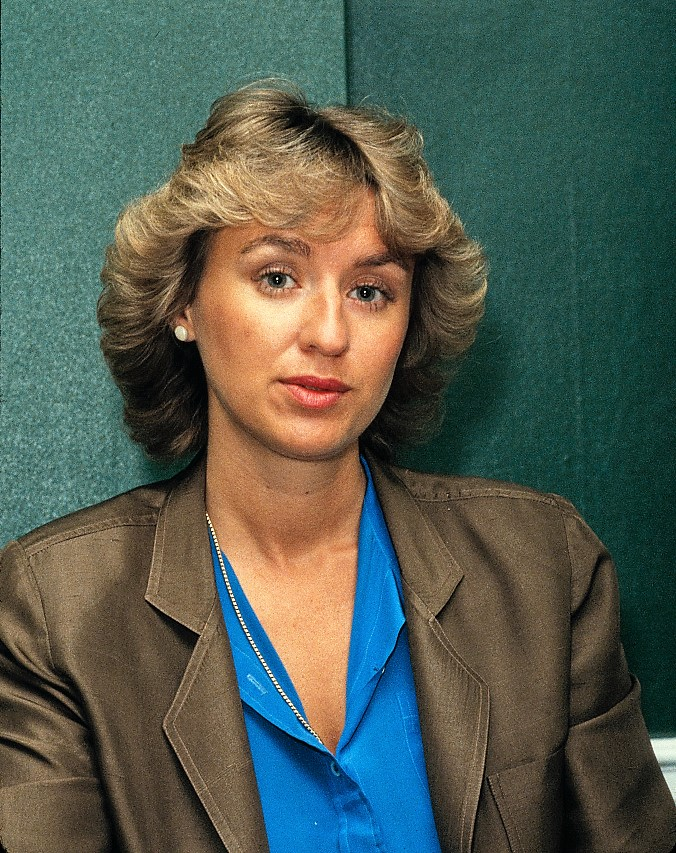
Brown as editor of Vanity Fair magazine, between 1984 and 1987

In 1983, Newhouse brought Brown to New York to advise on Vanity Fair, a magazine he had resurrected earlier that year, with a circulation of 200,000. She served as a contributing editor for a brief time, and was named editor-in-chief on 1 January 1984. Upon taking over the magazine, she found it to be "pretentious, humourless. It wasn't too clever, it was just dull."

The first contract writer she hired was movie producer Dominick Dunne, who she met at a dinner party hosted by the writer Marie Brenner. Dunne told Brown he was going to California for the trial of his daughter's murderer. Brown suggested he keep a diary as solace, and his resulting report (headlined "Justice: A Father's Account of the Trial of his Daughter's Killer") proved the launch of Dunne's long-running magazine career.

Early pieces such as Dunne's cover story on accused murderer Claus von Bülow and Los Angeles arrivistes such as Candy Spelling, as well as the use of provocative covers, transformed the prospects of the magazine. Among others, Brown signed up Marie Brenner, Gail Sheehy—who wrote a series of widely read political profiles, including a cover story on Mikhail Gorbachev—Jesse Kornbluth, T.D. Allman, Stephen Schiff, Lynn Hirschberg, Peter J. Boyer, John Richardson, James Atlas, Alex Shoumatoff and Ben Brantley. The magazine became a mix of celebrity news and serious foreign and domestic reporting. Brown persuaded novelist William Styron to write about his depression under the title Darkness Visible, which subsequently became a best-selling non-fiction book. At the same time, Brown formed fruitful relationships with photographers Annie Leibovitz, Harry Benson, Herb Ritts, and Helmut Newton. Leibovitz's portrayals of Jerry Hall, Diane Keaton, Whoopi Goldberg and others came to define Vanity Fair. Its best-known cover of this period featured a naked and pregnant Demi Moore in August 1991.

Three stories from June to November 1985 helped the magazine gain attention and circulation in a year when rumours were rife that it was to be folded into The New Yorker. Harry Benson's cover shoot of Ronald and Nancy Reagan dancing in the White House; Helmut Newton's portrait of accused murderer Claus von Bülow in his leathers with his mistress Andrea Reynolds with reporting by Dominick Dunne, and Brown's own cover story on Diana, Princess of Wales in November 1985 titled "The Mouse That Roared".

Sales of Vanity Fair rose from 200,000 to 1.2 million. In 1988, Brown was named Magazine Editor of the Year by Advertising Age magazine. Advertising topped 1,440 pages in 1991 and circulation revenues rose. Despite this success, professor Jeffrey Pfeffer in his book Power: Why Some People Have It – And Others Don't suggested that the magazine was losing money. In a letter to the editor of the Evening Standard, Bernard Leser, president of Condé Nast USA, stated Pfeffer's claim was "absolutely false" and affirmed that Vanity Fair had indeed earned "a very healthy profit." Leo Scullin, an independent magazine consultant, called it a "successful launch of a franchise." Under Brown's editorship, Vanity Fair won four National Magazine Awards, including a 1989 award for General Excellence.

In November 1990, two months after the first Gulf War started, Brown refused a picture of the blond Marla Maples for the cover and replaced it with a photograph of Cher. The reason for her last-minute decision, she quipped to The Washington Post: "In light of the Gulf crisis, we thought a brunette was more appropriate."

=== The New Yorker ===
In 1992, Brown accepted the company's invitation to become editor of The New Yorker, the fourth editor in its 73 year history, following Harold Ross, William Shawn, and Robert Gottlieb. Brown was the first woman to hold the position. Before taking over, she immersed herself in vintage New Yorkers, reading the issues produced by founding editor Ross: "There was an irreverence, a lightness of touch as well as a literary voice that had been obscured in later years when the magazine became more celebrated and stuffy. ... Rekindling that DNA became my passion."

"The New Yorker is a text-driven magazine and always will be, and certainly will be under my tenure," she said. Text, she added, was her "first love." Anxieties that Brown might change the identity of The New Yorker as a cultural institution prompted a number of resignations. George Trow, who had been with the magazine for almost three decades, accused Brown of "kissing the ass of celebrity" in his resignation letter. (To which Brown reportedly replied, "I am distraught at your defection but since you never actually write anything I should say I am notionally distraught.") The departing Jamaica Kincaid described Brown as "Stalin in high heels." Garrison Keillor quit immediately when he learned of her hire.

However, Brown had the support of New Yorker stalwarts John Updike, Roger Angell, Brendan Gill, Lillian Ross, Calvin Tomkins, Janet Malcolm, Harold Brodkey and Philip Hamburger, as well as newer staffers Adam Gopnik and Nancy Franklin. During her editorship, she let 79 staffers go and engaged 50 new writers and editors, including David Remnick (whom she nominated as her successor), Malcolm Gladwell, Anthony Lane, Jane Mayer, Jeffrey Toobin, Hendrik Hertzberg, Hilton Als, Ken Auletta, Simon Schama, Lawrence Wright, John Lahr, Pamela McCarthy, and executive editor Dorothy Wickenden. Brown introduced the annual fiction issue and the holiday cartoon issue. She also collaborated with Harvard professor Henry Louis Gates to devote an issue to the theme Black in America.

Brown broke the magazine's longstanding reluctance to treat photography seriously in 1992, when she invited Richard Avedon to be its first staff photographer. She approved controversial covers, including Edward Sorel's October 1992 image of a punk-rock passenger sprawled in the back seat of an elegant horse-drawn carriage, which may have been Brown's self-mocking riposte to fears that she would downgrade the magazine. A year later Valentine's Day publication of Art Spiegelman's cover of a Jewish man and a Black woman in an embracing kiss, a comment on the mounting racial tensions between Blacks and ultra-Orthodox Jews in the Crown Heights section of Brooklyn, New York, garnered controversy. Brown appointed Spiegelman's wife Françoise Mouly as the magazine's art editor.

During Brown's tenure, the magazine received four George Polk Awards, five Overseas Press Club Awards, and ten National Magazine Awards, including a 1995 award for General Excellence, the first in the magazine's history. Newsstand sales rose 145 percent. The New Yorker's circulation increased to 807,935 for the second half of 1997, up from 658,916 during the corresponding period in 1992. Critics maintained it was hemorrhaging money, but Newhouse remained supportive, viewing the magazine under Brown as a start-up: "It was practically a new magazine. She added topicality, photography, color. She did what we would have done if we invented The New Yorker from scratch. To do all that was costly. We knew it would be." Under Brown, its economic fortunes improved every year: In 1995 losses were about $17 million, in 1996 $14 million, and in 1997 $11 million.

In 1998, Brown resigned from The New Yorker following an invitation from Harvey and Bob Weinstein of Miramax Films (then owned by The Walt Disney Company) to chair Talk Media. Opinions of Brown's New Yorker tenure varied. Editorial director Hendrik Hertzberg wrote: "She had to move fast. She was decisive ... went against the tradition of popular culture unfriendly to the written word. And what was she doing? She was pumping energy and life into a magazine devoted to publishing aesthetically and intellectually demanding writing. She saved The New Yorker." Writer Adam Gopnik said, "The magazine will remain smarter and braver—more open to argument, and incomparably less timid—for her presence here." Randy Cohen wrote, "I assume we can now look forward to Miramax becoming a shallow, celebrity-obsessed money loser she made The New Yorker." Writer Michael Kinsley wrote, "She is the best magazine editor alive. What more can I say?" Writer Stanley Crouch said, "The most important thing, I think, has been [Brown's] effort to bring together the intellectual material and the streets. When she was in charge, despite all the complaints from the old New Yorker crowd, one got a much stronger sense of the variousness of American society than one did under the editorship of perhaps the rightfully sainted Mr. Shawn."

=== Talk magazine ===
In July 1998, Brown, along with Harvey and Bob Weinstein of Miramax Films and Ron Galotti, founded Talk Media to publish books, a magazine, and movies and television programs. Talk Media formed a joint venture with Hearst Magazines for Talk magazine, a monthly compendium of news and culture, in February 1999. Brown worked with the book division's editor in chief Jonathan Burnham and acquiring editor Susan Mercandetti. She recalled in November 2017 at the time of allegations of sexual assault being made against Harvey Weinstein: "Strange contracts pre-dating us would suddenly surface, book deals with no deadline attached authored by attractive or nearly famous women."

Staff members included editors Sam Sifton, Danielle Mattoon, Jonathan Mahler and Virginia Heffernan. Jake Tapper and Tucker Carlson provided political columns. Notable articles included the first US profile of Osama bin Laden before 9/11, Tom Stoppard's autobiographical piece about his Jewish roots that was the origin of his 2020 play Leopoldstadt and Tucker Carlson's revealing profile of then Republican presidential candidate George W. Bush.

An anticipated magazine launch party at the Brooklyn Navy Yard in New York City was thwarted by mayor Rudy Giuliani, who reportedly felt it was not an appropriate use of the site. The event was moved to Liberty Island, where on 2 August 1999, more than 800 political leaders, writers, and Hollywood notables, including Madonna, Salman Rushdie, Demi Moore, and George Plimpton, arrived by barge for a picnic dinner at the feet of the Statue of Liberty under thousands of Japanese lanterns and a Grucci fireworks display. An interview with Hillary Clinton in the first issue claimed that the abuse her husband suffered as a child led to his adult philandering. The Washington Post reported that at times, "Talk seemed more interested in promoting such Miramax stars as Gwyneth Paltrow than in politics."

Despite having achieved a circulation of 670,000 Talk magazine's publication was halted in January 2002 in the wake of the advertising recession following the 9/11 attacks. It was Brown's first very public failure, but she said she had no regrets about embarking on the project. She told Charlotte Edwardes of The Telegraph in 2002: "My reputation rests on four magazines—three great successes, one that was a great experiment. I don't feel in any way let down. No big career doesn't have one flame out in it and there's nobody more boring than the undefeated."

Politico estimated that Brown had "bombed through some $50 million in 2 1/2 years" on the failed venture, an assessment that did not include revenue from the book division. Talk Miramax Books flourished as a boutique publishing house until it was detached from Miramax in 2005 and folded into Hyperion at Disney. Out of 42 books published during Brown's time, 11 appeared on The New York Times Best Seller list, including Leadership by Giuliani, Leap of Faith by Queen Noor of Jordan, Stolen Lives by Malika Oufkir, Experience by Martin Amis and Madam Secretary by Madeleine Albright. A $1 million contract settlement in 2002 ended Brown's involvement in Talk Media.

=== Topic A ===
After Brown hosted a series of specials for CNBC, the network signed her to host a weekly Sunday evening talk show of politics and culture titled Topic A with Tina Brown, which debuted on 4 May 2003. Guests included politicians Tony Blair and Senator John McCain and celebrities such as George Clooney and Annette Bening. Topic A struggled to find an audience on Sunday nights. It averaged 75,000 viewers in 2005, about the same as The Big Idea with Donny Deutsch (79,000) and John McEnroe's McEnroe (75,000.) Brown resigned to write The Diana Chronicles.

=== Books ===
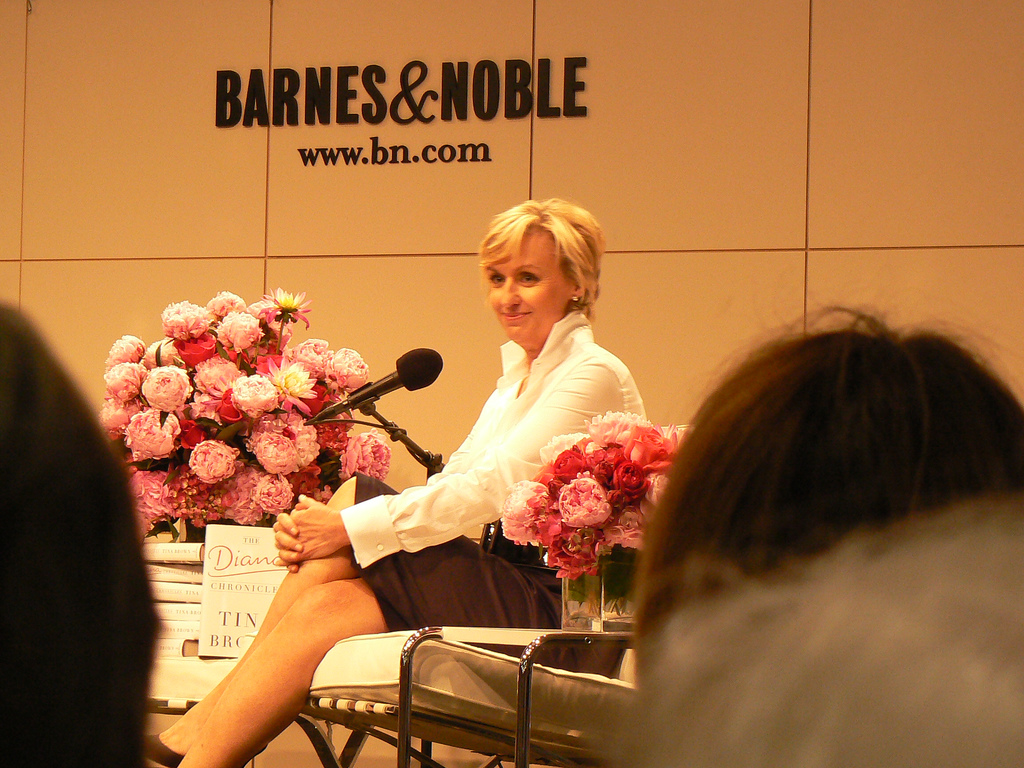
Tina Brown speaking at Barnes and Noble about The Diana Chronicles

Brown's biography of Diana, Princess of Wales was published in June 2007, just before the 10th anniversary of Diana's death. The Diana Chronicles made The New York Times Best Seller list for hardback nonfiction, with two weeks in the number one position. In 2017, Brown published The Vanity Fair Diaries, culled from her eight and a half years as editor in chief of Vanity Fair.

In 2022, Brown published a sequel to The Diana Chronicles called The Palace Papers: Inside the House of Windsor—The Truth and the Turmoil, on the period between the deaths of Diana, Princess of Wales and Queen Elizabeth II. It topped The New York Times best seller list and sold 250,000 copies in the US.

"[Brown] becomes the ideal tour guide," reviewed The Wall Street Journal: "witty, opinionated and adept at moving us smoothly from bedchamber to below stairs while offering side trips to the cesspits of the tabloid press, the striving world of second-tier celebrities and the threadbare lodgings of palace supernumeraries." Philip Hensher wrote in a review for The Spectator, "Some of the gossip, all books of this sort, is grossly implausible."

=== The Daily Beast ===
On 6 November 2008, Brown teamed up with Barry Diller to launch The Daily Beast, an online news site. The site gained popularity after Christopher Buckley, posted a column announcing his support of Barack Obama. Other news-making pieces included Lucinda Franks's coverage of the Bernie Madoff scandal. Regular contributors to The Daily Beast have included John Avlon, former CIA analyst Bruce Riedel, former Council on Foreign Relations president emeritus Leslie Gelb, and journalist Michelle Goldberg. The Daily Beast won the Webby Award for Best News Site in 2012 and 2013.

On 12 November 2010, The Daily Beast and Newsweek announced they would merge operations in a joint venture to be owned equally by Sidney Harman and IAC/InterActiveCorp called the Newsweek Daily Beast Company, with Brown as editor in chief and Stephen Colvin as CEO. In December 2012, the then final printed issue of Newsweek was published. A cover headline stated the magazine would change to a digital format, alongside an editorial written by Brown. The digital format was short-lived: the print edition returned after Brown's departure.

In September 2013, while with The Daily Beast, Brown was accused of falsely printing stories about Amanda Lindhout, a kidnapped Canadian journalist who was abused for 15 months by her insurgent Islamist kidnappers in Somalia, including an incorrect story about an alleged Lindhout pregnancy that never took place. A resulting retraction was printed by National Public Radio in response to Brown's comments. On 11 September 2013, Brown announced her departure. Initial reports of her contract not being renewed were refuted in a statement issued by Barry Diller, IAC/InterActiveCorp's executive director: "If you removed the failed experiment to revive Newsweek, the story of The Daily Beast is one of excellence in reporting, in design, and in digital distribution. That to me is the lede of [Brown's] tenure." Brown's resignation caused speculation in the media in regard to the future of the website. Her hand-picked successor as executive editor, John Avlon, addressed the question succinctly: "The Daily Beast roars on."

=== Women in the World ===
In 2010, Brown founded Women in the World, a live journalism platform, to "discover and amplify the unheard voices of global women on the front lines of change." First held at New York’s Hudson Theater, and thereafter at Lincoln Center’s David Koch Theater, Women in The World summits convened women leaders, activists and political change-makers from around the world to share their stories and offer solutions to building a better life for women and girls. Former ABC news producer Kyle Gibson was senior executive producer and managing editor of the inaugural event.

The first summit took place on 12–14 March 2010, and included appearances by Queen Rania of Jordan, Meryl Streep, Valerie Jarrett, Christine Lagarde, Hillary Clinton, Madeleine K. Albright, Nora Ephron, and Katie Couric. At the second summit, held on 10–12 March 2011, participants included Hillary Clinton, Dr. Hawa Abdi, Condoleezza Rice, Sheryl Sandberg, Dr. Ngozi Okonjo-Iweala, Diane Von Furstenberg, Melinda Gates and Ashley Judd.

More than 2,500 ticket buyers attended the three-day summit at Lincoln Center. At subsequent summits featured guests included Angelina Jolie, Oprah Winfrey, Nobel Peace Prize laureate Maria Ressa, Nobel Peace Prize laureate Leymah Gbowee, Barbra Streisand, Nancy Pelosi, Gloria Steinem, Zainab Salbi, Christiane Amanpour, Justin Trudeau, Masih Alinejad, Nikki Haley, Lynsey Addario, Cecile Richards, Priyanka Chopra, Melinda Gates, Chimamanda Ngozi Adiche, Nicholas Kristof, Ajay Banga and Anna Wintour. In 2012, Women in the World expanded outside the United States with a summit held in São Paulo, Brazil. Between 2012 and 2019 Women in the World summits and salons were held in New Delhi, Toronto, London and Dubai, as well as Washington DC, San Antonio, Dallas, Los Angeles and Miami. The Women in the World summits ended during the COVID-19 pandemic.

=== Truth Tellers ===
In 2023, in partnership with Reuters and Durham University, Brown hosted Truth Tellers, the first annual Sir Harry Evans Global Summit in Investigative Journalism, at the Royal Institute of British Architects, in honor of her late husband Sir Harold Evans, the former editor of The Sunday Times. The summit was attended by over 400 investigative journalists and editors from the UK, the US, Ukraine, Mexico, Russia, Nigeria, South Africa, Canada, Iran, Bulgaria and France. Among the guests were Bob Woodward and Carl Bernstein in conversation with Emily Maitlis about What Makes a Great Investigative Journalist, activist Bill Browder, Bellingcat investigator Christo Grozev, Head of Investigations and Chairwoman of the Board for the Anti-Corruption Foundation (founded by Alexei Navalny) Maria Pevchikh, Russian journalist and writer Mikhail Zygar on the weaponization of media in Russia, and the creator and writer of HBO show Succession Jesse Armstrong.

== Personal life ==
In 1973, the literary agent Pat Kavanagh introduced Brown's writings to Harold Evans, editor of The Sunday Times, who was then married to Enid Parker. In 1974, Brown was given freelance assignments by Ian Jack, the paper's features editor. When a relationship developed between Brown and Evans, Brown resigned to write for the rival Sunday Telegraph. Evans divorced Parker in 1978, and he and Brown married on 20 August 1981, at Grey Gardens, the East Hampton, New York, home of The Washington Post executive editor Ben Bradlee and Sally Quinn. They lived together in New York City until Evans's death on 23 September 2020. They had two children: a son, Georgie, born in 1986, and a daughter, Isabel, born in 1990. In 2024, Brown wrote that Georgie is her "38-year-old on-the-spectrum son who still lives with me." Evans was knighted for his services to journalism in 2004.

== Works ==
- — (1979). Loose Talk: Adventures on the Street of Shame. London: Joseph. ISBN 0-7181-1833-2.
  - collection of articles for Tatler
- — (1983). Life As a Party. London: A. Deutsch. ISBN 0-233-97600-0.
  - collection of articles for Tatler
- — (2017). Remembering Diana: A Life in Photographs. National Geographic Books. ISBN 978-1-4262-1853-8.
- — (2007). The Diana Chronicles. New York: Doubleday. ISBN 978-0-385-51708-9.
- — (2017). The Vanity Fair Diaries: 1983–1992. London: Weidenfeld & Nicolson.
- — (2022). The Palace Papers: Inside the House of Windsor, the Truth and the Turmoil. New York: Crown. ISBN 978-0-59313810-6.

== Filmography ==
- 2026: The Devil Wears Prada 2, as herself

== Awards and honors ==
- 10 National Magazine Awards
- 4 George Polk Awards
- 5 Overseas Press Club Awards
- 2000: Appointed a Commander of the Order of the British Empire (CBE) in the 2000 Birthday Honours by HM Queen Elizabeth II, for services to journalism overseas
- 2007: Inducted into the American Magazine Editor's Hall of Fame.
- 2021: Honored as Library Lion by the New York Public Library.
- 2022: Women in Journalism Lifetime Achievement Award

== Sources ==
- Bachrach, Judy (2001). Tina and Harry Come to America: Tina Brown, Harry Evans, and the Uses of Power. New York: Free Press. ISBN 0-684-83763-3.
- Evans, Harold (5 November 2009). My Paper Chase: True Stories of Vanished Times. Little, Brown. ISBN 978-0-316-03142-4.
- Felsenthal, Carol (4 January 2011). Citizen Newhouse: Portrait of a Media Merchant. Seven Stories Press. ISBN 978-1-60980-195-3.
- Maier, Thomas (3 September 2019). All That Glitters: Anna Wintour, Tina Brown, and the Rivalry Inside America's Richest Media Empire. Simon and Schuster. ISBN 978-1-5107-4492-9.
- Navasky, Victor S.; Cornog, Evan (5 September 2012). The Art of Making Magazines: On Being an Editor and Other Views from the Industry. Columbia University Press. ISBN 978-0-231-50469-0.
- Oppenheimer, Jerry (1 April 2007). Front Row: Anna Wintour: The Cool Life and Hot Times of Vogue's Editor in Chief. St. Martin's Publishing Group. ISBN 978-1-4299-0763-7.

Media offices
Preceded by Leslie Field	Editor of Tatler; 1979–1983	Succeeded by Libby Purves
Preceded by Leo Lerman	Editor of Vanity Fair; 1984–1992	Succeeded by Graydon Carter
Preceded by Robert Gottlieb	Editor of The New Yorker; 1992–1998	Succeeded by David Remnick
