= Rebecca Lolosoli =

Kenyan women's rights activist

Rebecca Samaria Lolosoli MCA
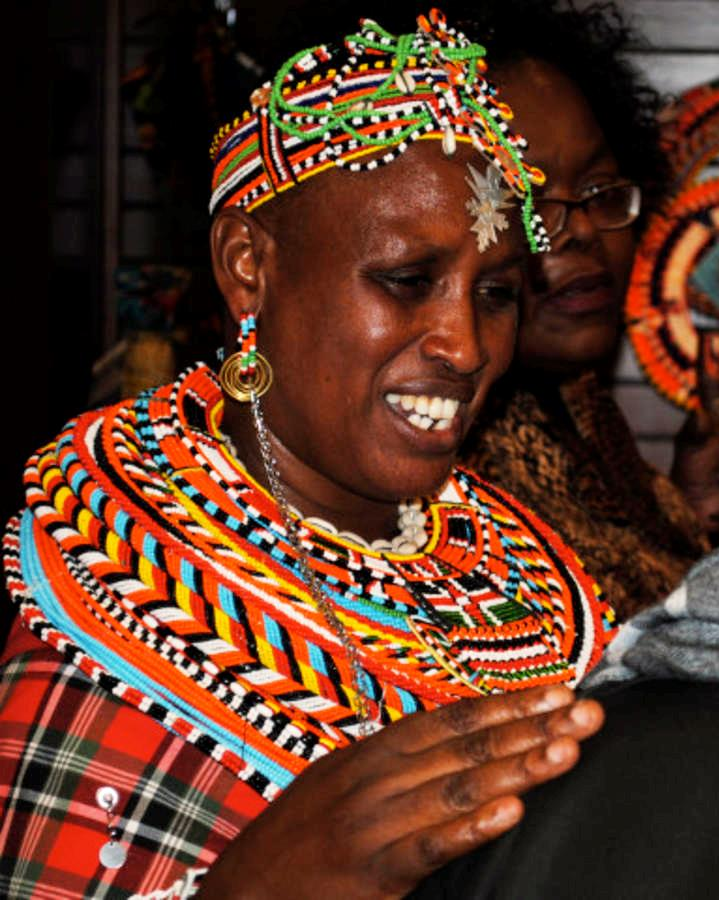
- Portrait of Rebecca Lolosoli

Founder of the village of Umoja

Member of the Samburu County Assembly

Personal details
- Born: 1962 (age 63–64) Wamba, District de Samburu
- Profession: Écologist

Rebecca Samaria Lolosoli (born 1962) is the founder and matriarch of the Umoja village in Samburu County of Kenya. The village is a refuge for women fleeing sexual abuse, and men are banned from the village.

== Biography ==
Rebecca Lolosoli talks about Umoja Women's Village in Kenya.

Lolosoli, born in 1962 in the village of Wamba, was one of six siblings. She began her education at Wamba girls' primary school in 1971 but left before completing her education.

She later enrolled in a Catholic nursing training center but had to drop out six months before finishing due to financial difficulties. At 18, she married Fabiano David Lolosoli, with a dowry of 17 cows. She established her own village business and became an advocate for women's rights. When she was assaulted and robbed, her husband did not intervene, prompting her to leave him. In 1990, she co-founded the village of Umoja with four other women, establishing it as a sanctuary exclusively for women.

In 1995, the women of Umoja elected her to chair the Maendeleo Ya Wanawake Organization (MYWO), an organization for the enhancement of women. She held the post for ten years.

In 2005, Lolosoli attended a United Nations conference in New York. She received death threats from local men over her stance on women's rights just before she went to New York.

Umoja was attacked in 2009 by Lolosoli's former husband, armed with a gun. He chased the women out of their home and allegedly was looking for Rebecca, who was not home at the time. In 2010, she was awarded the Global Leadership Award from Vital Voices.

== Commitment ==
=== Origin of her commitment to women's rights ===
When she was 15, she had her cut, a traditional rite practiced in the region. Later, she was sold for 17 cows and forcibly married to an official Kenyan businessman when she was 18 years old.

Rebecca narrowly escaped rape by British soldiers at Archer Post military base, a recurrent crime in the region (It is estimated that 1,400 rapes were perpetrated by British soldiers in the 1990s). There began her commitment to the feminine cause.

Rebecca acquired a certain financial independence through the sale of manufactured goods and thus opposed the patriarchal tradition of the region. Subsequently, she began to raise the problem of rape at local government meetings, which led to her being severely beaten and robbed by Samburu men. Faced with her husband's disinterest and inaction, Rebecca realized that her life was in danger. She ran away from home and created the village of Umoja in 1991 with the help of 15 other abused women. The year 2010 marked a turning point in her life since she finally obtained the right to divorce.

=== Life in Umoja village ===
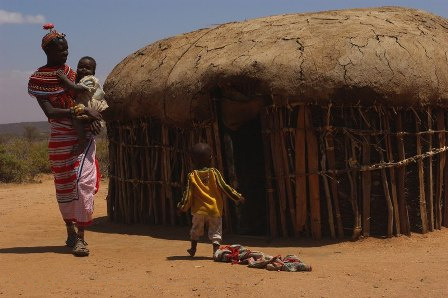
A family in Umoja

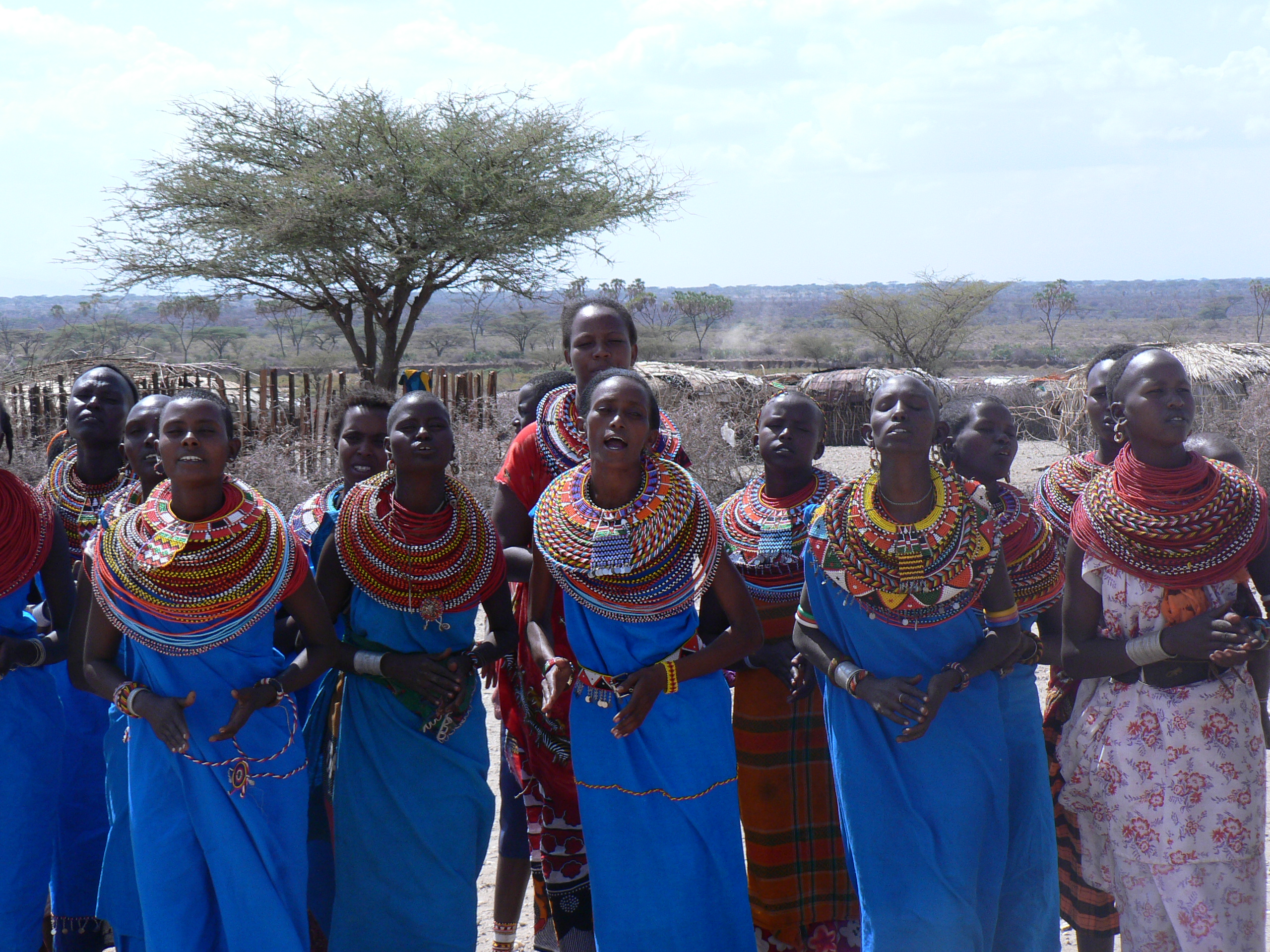
Women of Umoja

The creation of the village, reserved only for women, challenged a tribal system in which women could not have land or livestock or access to education. The village ensures the safety of its members (63 people in 2011) but above all offers possibilities for the future. As Rebecca Lolosoli has said:

"They become socially and economically independent and make decisions on matters that affect them directly"

From the beginning, Rebecca Lolosoli has held a central place in the village as a democratically elected matriarch. In order to meet their needs. Rebecca and the members of the village first sold agricultural products such as corn, sugar, etc. However, in the face of the low profits, they are moving towards other sectors such as the sale of pearl jewelry.

Economic success made it possible to purchase land for 200,000 shillings ($2,700) in order to gain land legitimacy against rival villages. In addition, the money raised allowed for the creation of a museum and a school for the children of Umoja and its surrounding villages. The popularity of the village and its uniqueness in the region has made the village a tourist destination. Rebecca's unusual career and her ongoing fight for the emancipation of women has been very well received internationally.

== International activities ==
Lolosoli chaired the "Maendeleo Ya Wanawake" Organization (MYWO) from 1995 to 2005. A non-profit organization of women volunteers with mission to improve the quality of life of rural communities in particular that of Kenyan women and youth. Four years later, Diane von Fürstenberg noticed her on a trip to Kenya and signed her up for Vital Voices, a non-profit, non-governmental organization that works in collaboration with the main actors of economic, empowerment women's political participation and human rights. This NGO was founded by Hillary Clinton in 1999. Rebecca received a "Global Leadership Award" in 2010 for her courageous initiative in the fight for women's rights.

In the same year, stylist Diane von Fürstenberg presented a spring collection inspired by traditional clothing from the village of Umoja. In 2009, these creations had already been presented during the parade of the DVF Catwalk.

In 2011, Lolosoli met Secretary of State Hillary Clinton at the Women in the World Summit in New York, bringing together the most influential figures in the fight for the recognition of women's rights. In 2012, Lolosoli received the GR8! Women Award for her commitment and her fight for women's rights. This title was awarded to her, along with 17 other women, in Dubai on March 7, 2012.

Lolosoli's story is recounted in Alyse Nelson's 2012 book Vital Voices: The Power of Women Leading Change Around the World.

== See also ==
- Umoja, Kenya
- Umoja: The Village Where Men Are Forbidden
