= Laurel J. Richie =

American basketball administrator

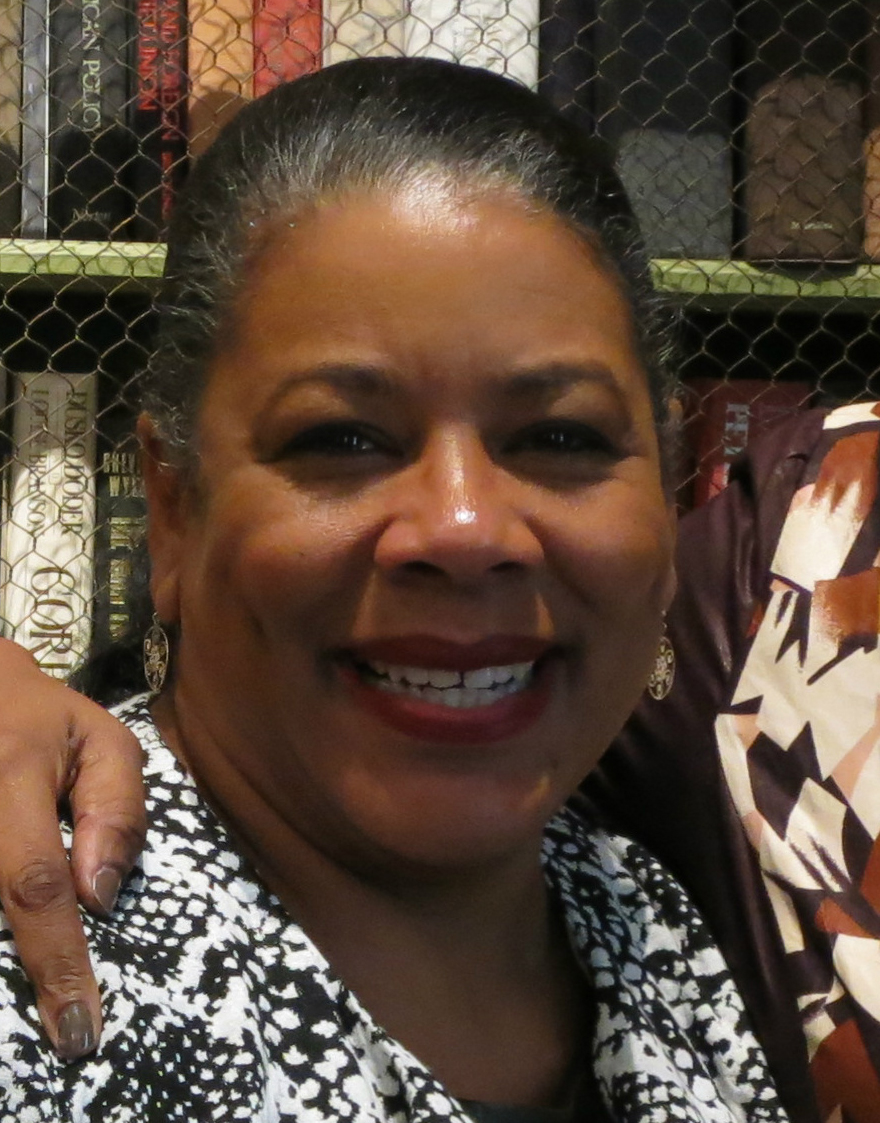

3rd President of the WNBA
- In office April 21, 2011 – November 9, 2015
- Preceded by: Donna Orender
- Succeeded by: Lisa Borders

Personal details
- Education: Dartmouth College

Laurel J. Richie is the former president of the Women's National Basketball Association (WNBA).

== Prior to the WNBA ==
She is a graduate of Shaker Heights High School. Before the WNBA, Richie served as Senior Vice President and Chief Marketing Officer for Girl Scouts of the USA. Prior to working at the Girl Scouts, Richie worked at Leo Burnett Worldwide, an advertising agency based in Chicago, from 1981-1983, where she worked on a host of Procter & Gamble brands. In 1984, she moved to Ogilvy & Mather, where she spent more than two decades building brands for blue chip clients including American Express, Pepperidge Farm and Unilever, among others. She continues to work with Ogilvy as a founding member of its Diversity Advisory Board, supporting efforts to attract and retain top talent.

Richie is a recipient of the YMCA Black Achiever's Award and Ebony magazine's Outstanding Women in Marketing and Communications. In April 2011, was named one of the 25 Influential Black Women in Business by The Network Journal. She also received the Black Girls Rock Shot Caller Award, the Sports Business Journal's Game Changer Award and Black Enterprise named her one of the Most Influential African Americans in Sports. Richie attended Dartmouth College. She earned her Bachelor of Arts in policy studies.

== WNBA ==
Richie was named president of the WNBA on April 21, 2011. She assumed her role on May 16. In 2014, she was named as one of ESPNW's Impact 25. On November 4, 2015 it was announced that she would depart her post as President of the WNBA. She currently is a consultant for Teach for America. The organization is an advocate for education equity. She also serves on the board of Synchrony Financial.

== Dartmouth College ==
On November 7, 2016, it was announced that the Board of Trustees of Dartmouth College appointed Richie as Chair of the Board. In June 2017 Richie, current vice Chair of the Board, will replace William W. Helman.
