= The Vanity Fair Diaries =

2017 book by Tina Brown

The Vanity Fair Diaries: 1983–1992
- Author: Tina Brown
- Language: English
- Publisher: Henry Holt and Company
- Publication date: November 14, 2017
- Pages: 448
- ISBN: 978-1-62779-136-6

The Vanity Fair Diaries: 1983–1992 is a 2017 book by Tina Brown. It is about her work at Vanity Fair.
