= Zoutelande (song) =

2017 single by BLØF featuring Geike Arnaert

Single by BLØF featuring Geike Arnaert

from the album Aan
- Language: Dutch
- Released: 20 October 2017
- Genre: Pop rock; folk
- Length: 3:43
- Label: Sony Music
- Songwriters: Axel Bosse; Peter Slager
- Producer: Ferdy van der Singel

BLØF singles chronology
"Wereld van verschil" (2017)	"Zoutelande" (2017)	"Zachtjes zingen" (2018)

"Zoutelande" is a song by Dutch rock band BLØF featuring Belgian singer Geike Arnaert, formerly the lead vocalist of Hooverphonic. It was released on 20 October 2017 as the second single from the band's twelfth studio album Aan. It is a cover of the German song "Frankfurt Oder" by Axel Bosse featuring Anna Loos, which was released in 2011. The album version featured only BLØF, but the duet with Arnaert was the version that became a hit in the Netherlands and Belgium.

The song was number one for ten weeks on the Dutch Top 40 in 2018. It was BLØF's second number-one hit, following "Holiday in Spain" with Counting Crows in 2004.

== Background ==
The song is a cover of the German song "Frankfurt Oder" by Axel Bosse featuring Anna Loos, which reached No. 35 in Germany in 2011. German singer Herbert Grönemeyer shared "Frankfurt Oder" with BLØF. He knew the band following a 2004 BLØF concert in Rotterdam. They discussed the idea of translating some German-language pop songs into Dutch, and Grönemeyer compiled a list of suggestions on a Spotify playlist which he sent to the band, which included "Frankfurt Oder". The band soon became fans of the song.

BLØF's lyricist Peter Slager quickly wrote a faithful Dutch-language translation, but his main challenge was finding an appropriate Dutch equivalent location. Frankfurt an der Oder, not to be confused with the much bigger and more well-known Frankfurt, was, according to Slager, a "gray, small and sad town" where "you don't want to be found dead at all." He thought that the seaside resorts of his native Zeeland were desolate in the winter, and moved the setting of the song to the village of Zoutelande. He almost chose Arnemuiden, but could not find words to rhyme with it.

=== Geike Arnaert duet ===
On the initial version of Aan released in May 2017, "Zoutelande" was sung solely by BLØF's vocalist Paskal Jakobsen. The band attempted the song with a few different featured female vocalists before landing on Geike Arnaert, who was the lead singer of the Belgian band Hooverphonic from 1997 to 2008. Arnaert was releasing a new album soon and wanted to gain exposure in the Netherlands, while BLØF felt that they had still not yet cornered the Belgian market despite their success in their home country, so it became mutually beneficial. This duet was released in October 2017 as the second single from Aan.

== Commercial performance ==
The song debuted at No. 36 on the Dutch Top 40 on 25 November 2017. It was the band's first appearance on the chart since 2014. It reached the top ten in its ninth week, becoming the band's first top-ten hit since "Mannenharten" with Nielson in 2013. "Zoutelande" reached number one on 2 February 2018 and remained there for ten weeks. It spent the fourth-most weeks at number one for a Dutch-language song. It was the band's first number-one hit in 14 years.

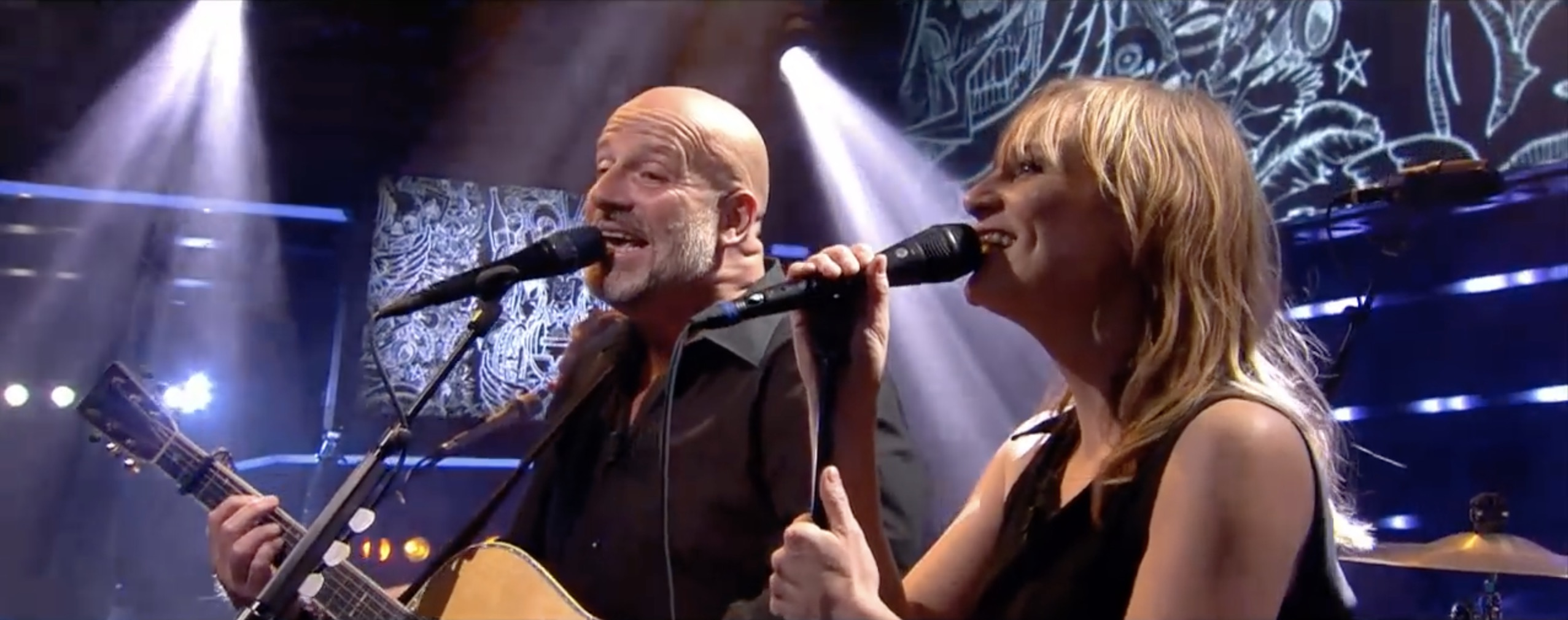
Bløf with Geike performing the song in a 2017 DWDW show

In March 2018, the song also reached number one on the Ultratop 50 in the Flanders region of Belgium, becoming BLØF's first number-one hit there. It was the first Dutch-language number-one single since K3's "10.000 luchtballonnen" in 2015. It was number one for six weeks in Flanders, breaking the decade record for most weeks at number one by a Dutch-language song, but this would soon be broken itself by "Hoe het danst" by Marco Borsato, Armin van Buuren and Davina Michelle in 2019 with its ten weeks.

In August 2023, the song reached 100 million streams.

== Live performances ==
On 14 April 2026, the band performed the song together with Hannah Mae during a televised appearance on NPO Radio 2.

== Legacy ==
The village of Zoutelande (population: 1500) became the second-smallest location referenced in the title of a Dutch number-one song, only beat by Rowwen Hèze's "Kronenberg". Owing to the popularity of the song, Zoutelande saw increased tourism in the summer of 2018 from both the Netherlands and Belgium, although the old beach house mentioned in the lyrics of the song does not actually exist. Hotel managers in Zoutelande recalled that guests immediately would say they wanted to visit because of the song.

In the annual NPO Radio 2 national Top 2000 greatest songs of all time poll, "Zoutelande" entered at No. 889 in 2017, and jumped up 858 positions to No. 31 in 2018.

== Charts ==
=== Weekly charts ===
Weekly chart performance for "Zoutelande"
Chart (2017–18)	Peak position
Belgium (Ultratop 50 Flanders)	1
Netherlands (Dutch Top 40)	1
Netherlands (Single Top 100)	3

=== Year-end charts ===
Year-end chart performance for "Zoutelande"
Chart (2018)	Position
Belgium (Ultratop 50 Flanders)	2
Netherlands (Dutch Top 40)	5
Netherlands (Single Top 100)	3

=== Decade-end charts ===
Chart (2010–2019)	Position
Netherlands (Single Top 100)	23
