= The Diana Chronicles =

2007 Biography by Tina Brown

- First UK edition
- Author: Tina Brown
- Language: English
- Genre: Biography
- Publisher: Random House
- Publication date: 12 June 2007
- Publication place: United Kingdom
- Media type: Print
- ISBN: 978-0-7679-2309-5

The Diana Chronicles is a 2007 British biographical book by Tina Brown that chronicles the life and death of Diana, Princess of Wales. The book's release coincided with the increased attention Diana had received leading up to the tenth anniversary of her death in 1997. Brown writes in a preface: The biography was based on over 250 interviews with men and women – members of Diana's intimate circle, associates in her public life and partners in her philanthropy.

== Content ==
Of the conspiracy theories surrounding the death of Diana in 1997, Brown surveys the evidence extensively and concludes "In any sequence of events of such complexity, speed, and drama, there are bound to be confusions and discrepancies. But the evidence is overwhelming that this was a traffic accident – period."

More than 250 witnesses came forward in the British Coroner's Inquests into the deaths of Diana and Dodi Fayed in 2007. After reporting and analyzing the evidence, the paperback edition of The Diana Chronicles carries an Afterword in which the author concludes: "The [inquests] were not so much an inquiry as an exorcism of every lie and myth surrounding the way the Princess died."

== Sales ==
The Diana Chronicles was at number one on The New York Times Best Seller list for hardback nonfiction for the week of 8 to 15 July 2007.

== Reception ==
According to Christopher Hitchens author of God Is Not Great:

Tina Brown has produced something that is, as well as absorbing and stirring, witty and penetrating.

According to Simon Schama author of A History of Britain:

Nothing comes close to Tina Brown's book for its tight grip on the dark human comedy that was Diana's life and death. The result is a compulsively page-turning trip to the poisoned place where class met glamour and result was catastrophe.

According to Tom Wolfe:

It's Dianamite!

According to Helen Mirren, Academy Award-winning actress:

Intensely well researched and an un-put-downable read, Tina Brown's extraordinary book parts the brocaded velvet, lifts the expensive net curtains, and allows us an unprecedented look at the world and mind of the most famous person on the planet.

According to The Daily Telegraph:

Whichever, the very pink, pictureless cover tells you that this is not a book that men will feel comfortable carrying around. It's aimed at women, American women judging by the way everything British has to be explained. Princess Margaret, for example, was 'the Queen's younger saucier sister'. Oh that Princess Margaret.

According to The Sunday Times:

Tina Brown’s The Diana Chronicles is not a book on Diana. It is the book. Not only does it put the story of Diana in its proper historical context of British politics, journalism and the changing mores of the past quarter century, but it is also a perfect example of the nosy-parker’s art. It conveys, better than anything I have ever read, the basic intelligence of its subject.

According to The Washington Post:

Diana's tragicomedy is Shakespearean in scale, with its slippery royal machinations, its agonized ironies, its seething jealousies and heartbreaking inevitability. Brown is no Shakespeare. But she gives us a walloping good read.

According to Christine Stansell in The New Republic:

So it is all the more delicious to report that The Diana Chronicles is that contradiction in terms: a summer spellbinder for serious people. Its pleasures are owed to more than its sensational subject.

John Lanchester wrote in The New Yorker:

But the best book on Diana is the newest, "The Diana Chronicles"....She tells the story fluently, with engrossing detail on every page, and the mastery of tone which made her Tatler famous for being popular with the people it was laughing at.

Selina Hastings in The Times Literary Supplement:

Like scraping barnacles off an old hulk, Tina Brown has taken the story of Princess Diana, hosed off layers of hearsay and myth, sifted through tons of accumulated legend, and presented us with a fresh and vividly perceptive portrait.

According to Royals historian Robert Lacey:

(Brown is) a brilliant writer, a very sharp social observer, and she always contributes fresh insight. She's persuaded people who have never spoken before to speak. (Her book) is an incredibly useful addition to the historical record.

According to Christopher Howse in The Daily Telegraph:

A recurrent word in the book is "complicity". This is not theatre but a video of complicity, as we linger over those moments of intimacy, fast-forwarding, pausing. If the camera rests on the outside of the bathroom door, we are made aware of the noises within. In the end, we hardly know what seems to soil our minds. On the last page should be printed, "Now, wash your hands.'

== Author ==
Tina Brown was a magazine editor for Vanity Fair and the New Yorker before authoring The Diana Chronicles. While at Vanity Fair she previously wrote about Diana's rocky marriage. In her 1985 article, The Mouse that Roared, which was the issue's cover story, she first broke the story of the breakdown in Diana's relationship with Prince Charles.
