= Jinwar =

Self-governed women's village in Kurdistan

Coordinates: 36.9983°N 40.5532°E

Jinwar is a village for women and children in the Autonomous Administration of North and East Syria (Rojava). Its construction began on 25 November 2016, during the Syrian Civil War. Construction of the houses of the villages began in 2017, and it was officially inaugurated on 25 November 2018, the International Day for the Elimination of Violence against Women. It is in part inspired by the women's village of Umoja, Kenya. It is based on the principle of self-sustainability and aims to give women a safe place to live, without violence and oppression. The word "Jin" means "woman" in the Kurdish language. The word "war" means "space", "land", or "home". Together the word "Jinwar" literally means "woman’s place" or "woman’s land." The women of Jinwar have created this community to be a place of solace for the oppression women have endured for centuries in Syria.

== Jinwar's Philosophy ==
2018 VOA report about Jinwar

Jinwar's philosophy is that by giving women the necessary resources and tools to educate themselves, they will become free from the social constraints under a patriarchal society, which in turn creates freedom for everyone. A line written on the walls of Jinwar reflects the ideology of these women, "Without women there is no freedom. Until women educate and empower themselves, there won’t be freedom." The message of the commune is to liberate women by uplifting them and by raising awareness of the injustices women in Syria have faced for centuries. Through the implementation of educational programs such as sewing, reading, and writing, and even driving lessons, the women and children in Jinwar have an abundance of opportunities they could not even fathom having access to before moving there.

== Historical Context ==
=== Jineology (Jineologi) ===
Jineology is a primary foundation for Jinwar's philosophy. Abdullah Ocalan, one of the founders of the PKK, advocated for Jineology. Ocalan believed that for the world to reach full liberation, there must be a radical women's revolution that challenges all aspects of oppression. This is at the core of the Jineology belief system. The ideology establishes an alternative means of reviewing social sciences in contrast with historical androcentric systems of knowledge. "With Jineoloji, the science of women, she will develop social and scientific remediation methods and deepen her knowledge of education, art, production, ecology, economics, demography, health, history, ethics-aesthetics, and self-defense."

=== Historical Women's Movement in Syria ===
Jinwar's official website introduces their fight for female-only spaces by recalling the beginnings of the women's movement in the Middle East. They state, "Several millennia ago in the Middle East a women’s revolution took place. On the shores of the Euphrates, Tigris, Habur and Zap rivers, women led the development of a meaningful life, based on ethics, nature, humanity, and rationality. This process culminated in the Neolithic revolution. That this history of the Middle East, and women’s own social history, is still alive is vividly reflected at Göbeklitepe, Vajukani, Orkiş, Çemê Xellan, Kortik Tepe, and Şanidar cave. World historians and archaeologists have confirmed these findings, which are also our own lived truths and experiences."

=== Modern Day Women’s Movement Syrian Civil War and Women-Only Communes ===
The women's movement in Rojava is directly related to the construction of Jinwar. The women's movement in Syria is hundreds of years old, but it reached a recent turning point in 2011 when the Syrian Civil War began. Jinwar was created out of a need women were having in Syria to take refuge away from their oppressive patriarchal communities. The community of Jinwar was inspired by another all-female commune called Umoja in Kenya, where women were facing similar mistreatment. The Syrian Civil War, which has been going on since March 15, of 2011, has wreaked havoc on the country. Many of the women who have fled to Jinwar are victims of various forms of assault either from soldiers who invaded their communities during the war and/or at the hands of the men in their villages. "Some of the women who live there have fled displacement, rape, imprisonment and death at the hands of ISIS and other armed groups. "In the war conditions that we have been through, every woman suffered. Every woman was hurt. Every woman was lost, but Jinwar brought them together," claimed Fatima Emin, a resident of Jinwar, in an interview done by CNN. The war has caused an immense amount of trauma for female refugees. Women face the threat of sexual assault and rape on a regular basis under the conditions of the Syrian Civil War. "A June 2015 investigation by the International Rescue Committee (IRC) questioned 190 women and girls from Dara’a and Quneitra, and found 40 per cent had experienced sexual violence while trying to access aid." The women who founded Jinwar, aimed to create a community in which women could free themselves of the oppressive patriarchal constraints that have limited their mobility in society for hundreds of thousands of years. The women of Jinwar feel that by choosing their own lifestyle and a sustainable community they are able to find freedom. As stated on Jinwar's official website, "By working to build a free women’s village, in essence we aim to transform all living spaces of society."

=== Kongra Star Formation and Aid for Women's Movement Organizations ===
Kongra Star, also known as the Star Congress, is the confederation which serves as council to all Women's groups in Rojava. The confederation was founded in 2005. “Star Congress is based on the voluntary union of democratic organizations, institutions, and democratic figures. It is a confederal women’s organization which organizes itself in the form of communes, assemblies, academies, cooperatives, foundations, associations, parties, etc.” Their goal is to bring awareness and recognition to the injustices women have faced for centuries in Rojava as well as other parts of Syria. The members of the Kongra Star give a voice to women who face oppression everywhere.

=== Groups Associated with Women's Movement ===
There are multiple female combat groups who have continuously worked at the forefront of conflict in Syria. There is no formal count of how many female soldiers are involved in the Syrian Civil War. However, an estimated 30% to 40% are assumed to be among the organizations involved in combat. There are multiple women's combat groups which emerged from this need for female representation.

PKK is one of the largest Kurdish military forces in Syria and contains one of the largest amount of female militants in the world. “The women’s military wing of the PKK, Yekîneyên Jinên Azad ên Star (YJA-Star), have challenged traditional gender roles and contributed to the idea of “democratic confederalism,” a term the PKK leader Abdullah Ocalan coined to highlight a move away from patriarchal nationalism.”

YPJ is among these organizations that work with the Kongreya Star academy. There are members of Jinwar who are also part of another female-activist group called YPJ. YPJ stands for "Women’s Protection Units." The YPG and YJP use guerrilla warfare tactics to commit surprise attacks.

== Location ==
The village of Jinwar is located in the western part of the ed-Derbasiah district in al-Hasakah canton in North Syria, close to "Kebaz hill" and near the villages of Karkand, Harba, Atishan and Kirwan. The commune is located in what is considered an “unstable region” due to Syria's ongoing conflict with Turkey. Jinwar rests on the Syrian-Turkish border, making it an easy target for Turkish invasion.

== Population ==
In the village women of all ethnicities and religions are welcome to settle together with their children. Arab and Kurdish, including Yazidi women live in Jinwar. The population of Jinwar is made up of women whose husbands have died during the war and women who have voluntarily chosen not to wed in efforts to escape the traditional gender roles they played in their previous community. Widows who lost their husband in war have preference to be accepted as residents of the village.

== Infrastructure ==
=== Construction of Buildings ===
The village consists of 30 houses, a clinic where patients are treated with herbs, the al-Om Awish school which is named after the mother of Abdullah Öcalan, a small museum and the JINWAR Academy. The women in Jinwar built their houses and other buildings through a process called "Kerpîç," which translates to "Adobe" in English. Adobe is an environmentally conscious and sustainable way of building because it uses natural resources such as "sand, sometimes gravel, clay, water, and often straw or grass." This method building consists of packing mud into a rectangular four-paneled brick mold. Then the bricks are laid out to bake in the sun and harden. Once the bricks are hardened, one can take the bricks and begin the process of laying the bricks on top of one another with a “mud” mortar consisting of water, dirt, and hay. Once the bricks are laid, a layer of the mud content is smoothed over the brick structure to form a smooth wall on the inside and outside of the building. Because the bricks are made with mud and sun-baked instead of being made with clay and fired in a kiln, the buildings are not as structurally sound as they could be. However, while this method of building has some structural flaws, it is both efficient and effective, given the environment in Jinwar. On Jinwar's website, it states that while from an outside perspective mud-brick construction might not appear to be innovative, to those who are coming from "battle zones where bullets, blood, gunpowder, and human parts are gathered have a different understanding of life, and their philosophy and vision of building with mud bricks is different."

=== Artwork in Community ===
The women in Jinwar have made the commune a beautiful place to live. They have painted murals on the buildings throughout the community. The artwork depicts the Jinwar message of strong women who are building an ecological community. One mural shows a woman holding two trees in the palm of her hand. One tree is bare with no sign of life, while the other tree is shown with an abundance of leaves. The artwork brings color and life to the community's initially bare buildings. The murals show the beauty of Jinwar's movement to liberate women.

== Educational Programs ==
=== Primary School ===
Within Jinwar there is a school that teaches students from first to sixth grade. After students have reached completion of this schooling program, they can then attend schools outside of the commune in neighboring communities. The women in Jinwar see education as one of the first steps of self-empowerment and becoming an independent woman.

=== Women's Academy ===
Jineology will primarily be taught in the Women's Academy. Lessons of the different fields Jineology are to be exchanged, taught and discussed. Additionally, a language program is also offered to older women in Jinwar. The languages taught are Kurdish, Arabic, and English.

=== Agriculture ===
The women in Jinwar grow their own food on a communal farm in the commune. Each family has their own plot of land they tend to. The items Jinwar published on their June Newsletter said "aubergines, paprika, tomato, bamya, beens, watermelon, melon, cucumber, onions, garlic and several other vegetables" The purpose of learning how to farm gives women a new sense of autonomy over how they get their food and a means of making money by selling left over produce to other communities.

== Government and Regulations ==
=== Democratic Council ===
Jinwar does not have a single central figure of leadership in the way many other villages in the world do. The commune has a democratically elected council. Each month the council members take turns serving as the town's leader. All women in the community have a voice in the political action that occurs in Jinwar.

=== Men Living in Jinwar ===
Men are not allowed to stay in the Jinwar. The only males who are granted permission to stay in the commune are the sons of the women who move there. "Men are allowed to visit during the day as long as they behave respectfully toward the women, but they cannot stay overnight." The women in the commune take turns protecting the entrance of the village. The women have shifts to monitor the outsiders who visit the community. The leaders of the commune intend on letting the children raised in Jinwar decide whether they want to remain living there once they come to the age of adulthood. “The boys will be allowed to stay in the village because they were raised with Jinwar's values.”

== Support for Jinwar by External Organizations ==
The Jinwar official website stated, “JINWAR is supported by women’s organizations all over the world. As an independent foundation, it is locally collaborating with the women’s communes and organizations including but not limited to: The Free Women’s Foundation of Rojava (Weqfa Jina Azad a Rojava), Kongreya Star, the Association of Martyrs’ Families, the Committee for Women's and Children's Affairs of Canton Cîzirê, and the Jineology Committee.”

== Continued War Conflict With Jinwar ==
=== 2019 Turkish Offensive ===
“Turkey is one of the powers in northern Syria that opposes two US-backed Kurdish groups: the Syrian Democratic Forces and People's Protection Units, known as YPG. Turkey sees elements of these groups as linked to the Kurdistan Workers’ Party, or PKK, an organization that Turkey considers a terrorist group.” ISIL poses another threat to the commune. “Even though the war on ISIS is over, the potential risk of sleeper cells and the state’s supporters loom over the region.” Sleeper cells are considered spies that do not act until they are told to by the group leaders they are working under. The village came under threat during the 2019 Turkish offensive in early November 2019. Following shellings by Turkey-lead forces, the village was temporarily evacuated on Monday 4 November. Local women reported the will to protect the village : "We cannot accept to lose what has been built up by so many. Let‘s defend each other against the attacks of the Turkish state and all other forms of patriarchal violence and oppression." " 'The women of Jinwar told us they were forced to leave their autonomous women’s village as the Turkish invasion drew close, continuing to advance despite the ceasefire,' Thomas McClure, a Syria-based researcher at the Rojava Information Center, told Kurdistan 24."

== Quotes from Residents of Jinwar ==
Fatima Emin, one woman who fled her community with her children after her husband was killed by ISIS by a land mine attack: "Jinwar is a response to every person who thinks of violating a woman's freedom, or sees the woman as the weaker sex in the society, or that she can't manage her life or manage her children...On the contrary, a woman can build her house. Here we are -- we built a village not only for Kurdish women, but we have Arab, we have Yazidi and some of our foreign friends are also living with us."

"Jinwar is life's spirit, nature's spirit and a free woman's spirit. The women here are establishing their existence in the entire society," Emin said. "I wish that the whole world would see Jinwar the same way we see it and I wish that we build more Jinwars in every region so that no woman would be subjected to injustice."

Jiyan Efrin moved to Jinwar alone to get away from the Turkish attack on Afrin, Syria. A city in the Northwest of Syria: "You feel like there is a normal society that you can live in," Efrin said. "We work, we farm and get paid, too, from the village council."

Zainab Gavary, a 28-year-old resident: "There’s no need for men here, our lives are good," "This place is just for women who want to stand on their feet."
