= Umoja Karamu =

African-American celebration

Umoja Karamu, meaning "unity feast" in Swahili, is an African-American celebration begun in 1971 by Dr. Edward Sims, Jr. Celebrated in a manner similar to Thanksgiving, Umoja Karamu is held on the fourth Sunday in November. Its purpose is to instill solidarity, black values, and appreciation of black heritage into black families. Prayers, libations to honor ancestors, historical readings, and feasts mark observances.

The celebration is based on five periods of African-American life, each represented by a color to be used in the ceremony.

1. Prior to Slavery - the color black, represents black families in Africa before slavery
2. In Slavery - the color white, symbolizes the scattering of black families during slavery
3. Upon Emancipation - the color red, marks blacks' liberation from slavery
4. Struggle for Liberation - the color green, significances the struggle for civil rights and equality
5. Looking to the Future - the color gold (or orange), points celebrants to hope for the future

The home observance of Umoja Karamu could proceed according to the following order:

1. Prayer
2. Libation - liquid poured in honor of the family's ancestors
3. Period Presentations - reading the narratives, playing the music, and passing the food
4. Feast

Community observances are very similar, with the following additions:

1. A place to honor the ancestors should be set at the table and after the ceremony its food and drink should be taken outside to be shared with nature.
2. Any elders present should share words of advice and encouragement at the conclusion of the program.
3. Unused food should be distributed to the poor and homeless in the community.

During the ceremony, participants read narratives about each time period as music indicative of the period is played. The five different colors are represented in the foods served in the feast. Currently, the Umoja Karamu is celebrated in homes and churches in several states. Umoja Karamu is said to be growing in popularity.
