= Umoja, Kenya =

All-female village in Samburu County, Kenya

Umoja
- Village
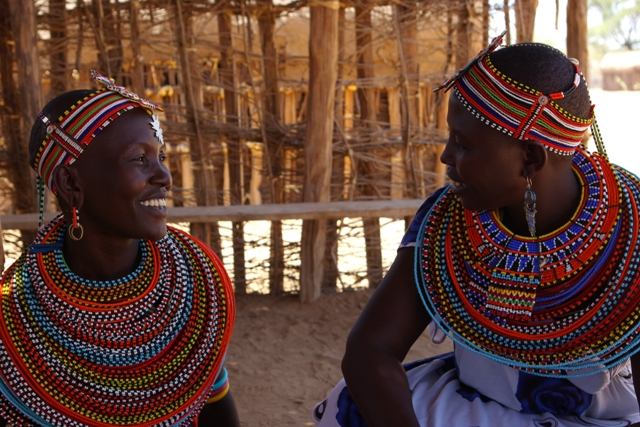
- Nickname: Village without men
- Location within Kenya
- Coordinates: 0°38′N 37°38′E
- Founded: 1990

Government
  - Type: Matriarchal village

Population (2015)
  - Total: 247
- Website: www.umojawomen.or.ke

Umoja Uaso ("unity" in Swahili; the Uaso Nyiro is a nearby river) is a village in central Kenya. The village, founded in 1990, is an all-female matriarchy located near the town of Archers Post in Samburu County, 380 km (240 mi) from the capital, Nairobi. It was founded by Rebecca Lolosoli, a Samburu woman, as a sanctuary for homeless survivors of violence against women, and young girls running from forced marriages or female genital mutilation. The women of the Samburu people do not agree with violence and the traditional subordinate position of women.

They run a primary school, cultural center and camping site for tourists visiting the adjacent Samburu National Reserve. They create and sell jewellery to benefit the village.

== History ==
Samburu women have a subordinate position in their society. They are not allowed to own land or other types of property, such as livestock. Women themselves are considered property of their husbands. They can be subject to female genital mutilation, forced marriage with the elders, rape, and domestic violence.

In 2003, Amnesty International reported credible evidence of numerous rapes of Kenyan women by members of the British Army for decades. A case was brought up against the British military for the rapes of over 1,400 Samburu women. The case was "cleared". These women were abandoned by their husbands because they were considered to be "defiled." Other men drove the women out of their houses fearing they would now contract sexually transmitted diseases from their raped wives.

After many women found themselves without homes, they created Umoja. Rebecca Lolosoli is one of the founders of Umoja, and came up with the idea of creating a village for women when she was recovering after being beaten for speaking out against female genital mutilation. Eventually fifteen women came together to found the original village in 1990.

In response, some men established their own, eventually unsuccessful villages nearby. The men tried to set up a rival craft business or would try to dissuade tourists from stopping at Umoja. The women eventually bought the land the men were occupying.

The villagers first started out by selling vegetables they bought from others, since they did not know how to farm themselves. This was not very successful, and the village turned to selling traditional crafts to tourists. The Kenya Wildlife Services took notice and helped the women learn from successful groups in areas such as the Maasai Mara, in order to improve Umoja's business. The women also had help from Kenya's Heritage and Social Services and the Ministry of Culture.

After Lolosoli visited the United Nations in 2005, men in the neighboring village filed a court case against her, hoping to shut down the village. In 2009, Lolosoli's former husband attacked the village, threatening her life. For a time, the women fled the village for their safety.

The women of the village currently own the land itself. As of 2021, the village's application for a community title over a tract of grazing land is undergoing government consideration.

== Geography and demographics ==
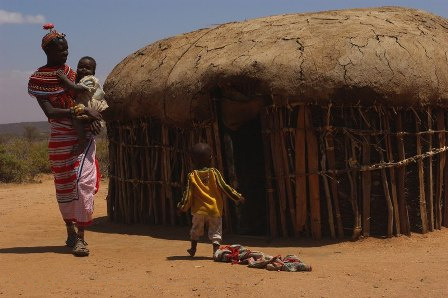
Family outside their hut in Umoja

Umoja is located in north-central Kenya in Samburu County, near Archers Post. The village is made up of manyata huts built from a mixture of earth and cow dung on an abandoned grassland. The houses are surrounded by a fence of thorns and barbed wire.

The people of the village have an objective to "improve the livelihoods of women due to rampant poverty and counter the problem of women being abandoned by their families." The village also takes in runaways or girls who have been thrown out of their households, and raises orphans, abandoned children and children with HIV. The village has also provided asylum for women fleeing violence from the Turkana District.

Residents in the community must all wear the traditional clothing and beadwork of the Samburu people. Female genital mutilation is outlawed in the village.

=== Population ===
Men are permitted to visit the village, but not allowed to live in Umoja. As of 2015, one man visited the village daily to do work tending to livestock. Boys raised in the village are asked to leave when they reach age eighteen. Only men who were raised as children in Umoja may sleep in the village.

The village also takes in orphans, runaways, and abandoned children. In 2005, there were 30 women and 50 children living in Umoja. As of 2015, there were 47 women and 200 children living in the village.

=== Economy ===
Residents of Umoja are engaged in traditional Samburu crafts which they sell at the Umoja Waso Women's Cultural Center. Crafts include colorful beads, a home-brewed low-alcohol beer analogue and more. The items are also available on a website. The women also run a campsite for tourists visiting the nearby Samburu National Reserve. Every woman donates ten percent of her earnings to the village as a tax to support the school and other needs.

The village suffered from a lack of income in 2020 due to the COVID-19 pandemic.

=== Education ===
In traditional society, children are engaged in tending livestock, but in Umoja, all children can get an education. There is a primary school that can accommodate 50 children. The village has also been able to open a nursery school.

Residents of the village go to other villages to promote women's rights and in order to campaign against female circumcision.

=== Government ===
The women of the village gather under the "tree of speech" to make decisions for the town. Lolosoli serves as the chairperson of the village. All women in the village have equal status to one another.

== See also ==
- Women only space
- Umoja: The Village Where Men Are Forbidden
- Jinwar, a village run along similar lines in northern Syria
- Gerudo, a fictional clan where only one man is born every 100 years
