= Women in the World =

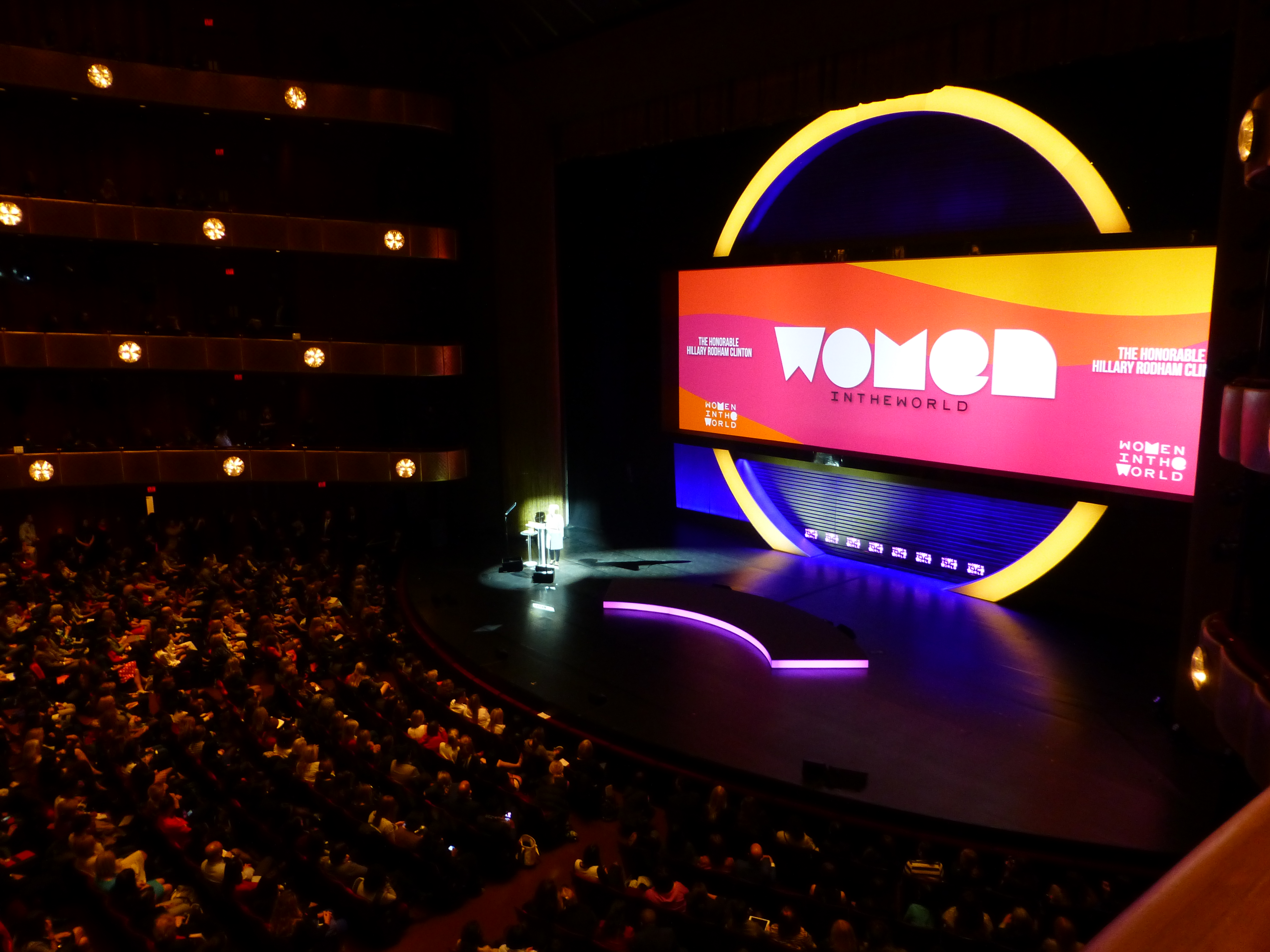
- Founded: 2010
- Location: New York City
- Website: womenintheworld.org

Women in the World was a live journalism platform that was founded by Tina Brown in 2010 to "discover and amplify the unheard voices of global women on the front lines of change."

First held at New York’s Hudson Theater, and thereafter at Lincoln Center’s David Koch Theater, Women in the World summits convened women leaders, activists and political change-makers from around the world to share their stories, and offer solutions to building a better life for women and girls. Former ABC news producer Kyle Gibson was senior executive producer and managing editor of the inaugural event.

The first summit took place March 12–14, 2010, and included appearances by Queen Rania of Jordan, Meryl Streep, Valerie Jarrett, Christine Lagarde, Hillary Clinton, Madeleine K. Albright, Nora Ephron, and Katie Couric. At the second summit, held March 10–12, 2011, participants included Hillary Clinton, Dr. Hawa Abdi, Condoleezza Rice, Sheryl Sandberg, Dr. Ngozi Okonjo-Iweala, Diane Von Furstenberg, Melinda Gates and Ashley Judd.

More than 2,500 ticket buyers attended the three-day summit at Lincoln Center. At subsequent summits, featured guests included Angelina Jolie, Oprah Winfrey, Nobel Peace Prize laureate Maria Ressa, Nobel Peace Prize laureate Leymah Gbowee, Barbra Streisand, Nancy Pelosi, Gloria Steinem, Zainab Salbi, Christiane Amanpour, Justin Trudeau, Masih Alinejad, Nikki Haley, Lynsey Addario, Cecile Richards, Priyanka Chopra, Melinda Gates, Chimamanda Ngozi Adichie, Nicholas Kristof, Ajay Banga and Anna Wintour.

In 2012, Women in the World expanded outside of the U.S. with a summit held in São Paulo, Brazil. Between 2012 and 2019 Women in the World summits and salons were held in New Delhi, Toronto, London and Dubai, as well as Washington DC, San Antonio, Dallas, Los Angeles and Miami.

The Women in the World summits ended during the COVID-19 pandemic.
