= Umoja: The Village Where Men Are Forbidden =

2009 French documentary film

Umoja, the Village Where Men Are Forbidden
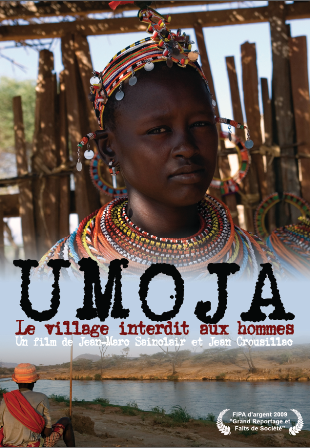
- French: Umoja, le village interdit aux hommes
- Directed by: Jean Crousillac; Jean-Marc Sainclair
- Written by: Jean Crousillac; Jean-Marc Sainclair
- Produced by: Jean Crousillac; Jean-Marc Sainclair
- Cinematography: Maëlenn Dujardin
- Edited by: Laura Delle Piane
- Production company: Backpack Productions
- Release date: 20 January 2009
- Running time: 52 minutes
- Country: France
- Languages: English; Swahili; Samburu

Umoja, the Village Where Men Are Forbidden is a French documentary film about the Kenyan village of Umoja, directed by Jean Crousillac and Jean-Marc Sainclair and released in 2009.

== Synopsis ==
From 1970 to 2003, hundreds of women claim they have been raped by British soldiers in the north of Kenya. Accused of bringing shame on their community, most of them have been beaten and repudiated by their husbands. A number of them gathered and created Umoja, a women-only village that quickly became the refuge of Samburu women. The success of Umoja immediately strengthened the jealousy of men who regularly attack the village and cause trouble for its founder, Rebecca Lolosoli.

== Awards and festival selections ==
2009

In 2009, the documentary won the Silver FIPA award in the category Great stories and Social Events and the Young European Jury Special Mention. It also won the Red Cross Award at the Reykjavík International Film Festival.

It was selected to the 2009 editions of the following international film festivals:

- International Film Festival and Forum on Human Rights (Geneva, Switzerland)
- Jean Rouch International Film Festival (Paris, France)
- International Documentary Film Festival (Thessaloniki, Greece)
- Ecovision Film Festival (Palermo, Italy)
- Festival Doc-Cévennes (Lasalle, France)
- Ciné Droit Libre (Ouagadougou, Burkina Faso)
- International Documentary and Anthroplogy Film Festival (Pärnu, Estonia)
- Document Human Rights Film Festival - Opening film (Glasgow, Scotland)
- Southern Appalachian International Film Festival (Tennessee, United States)
- Festival des Libertés (Brussels, Belgium)
- Flahertania International Film Festival (Perm, Russia)
- Festival International du Film d'Amiens (Amiens, France)
- Festival Ethnographique de Rio (Rio de Janeiro, Brazil)

2010

In 2010, the film won the first prize at the Festival Internacional de Cine de Derechos Humanos (Buenos Aires, Argentina).

It was selected to the 2010 editions of the following international film festivals:

- Vues d’Afrique (Montreal, Canada)
- Tartu World Film Festival (Tartu, Estonia)
- Festival Résistances (Foix, France)
- Native Spirit Film Festival (London, England)
- Inconvenient Films (Vilnius, Lithuania)
- Malawi Human Rights Film Festival (Lilongwe, Malawi)
- World Assembly of Community Radio (La Plata, Argentina)
- African Diaspora Film Festival (New York City, United States)
