= Deqo Mohamed =

Somali doctor

Deqo Aden Mohamed
- Born: Mogadishu, Somalia
- Citizenship: US
- Occupation: Obstetrician-gynaecologist
- Employer: Hagarla Institute
- Parents: Aden Mohamed (father); Dr Hawa Abdi (mother)
- Relatives: Dr Amina Mohamed (sister)

Dr. Deqo Aden Mohamed is a Somalia-born obstetrician-gynecologist who is the former CEO of the Dr. Hawa Abdi Foundation, Founder of Hagarla Institute and co-founder of Somali Cancer Society. The operations of the foundation are based in Hope Village, a complex in Mogadishu, Somalia, providing healthcare, education, and shelter to thousands of displaced people. The village was founded by Mohamed's mother Dr Hawa Abdi and is run alongside her sister, Dr Amina Mohamed. In addition to her executive role, Deqo Mohamed works as a doctor in the Dr Hawa Abdi General Hospital. Currently, the village is closed due to security in the area, the village was functioning from 1991-2020.

== Early life and education ==
Mohamed was born in Mogadishu, Somalia to Dr Hawa Abdi and Aden Mohamed. She went to college and medical school in Russia, helping her mother in the camp in between studying. Mohamed was chosen as a Yale Maurice R. Greenberg World Fellow in 2016.

== Career ==
After her studies, Mohamed immigrated to the US as a refugee in 2003. During this time she worked in multiple labs and was granted US citizenship in 2008. In 2010 she gave a TEDtalk alongside her mother Dr Hawa Abdi about their medical clinic. She returned to Somalia in 2007, feeling a sense of responsibility to help the situation in the country. She was chosen as a mentee for the Bank of America Global Ambassadors Program in 2014.

Mohamed is currently the Executive Director of Hagarla Institute and a board member of the Dr. Hawa Abdi Foundation in the US and works on the ground in Somalia nationwide to improve access to quality healthcare. The foundation aims to fund the ground project and Hagarla Institute to deliver serves, public health awareness, and training medical professionals "to create access to basic human rights in Somalia through building sustainable institutions in healthcare, education, agriculture, and social entrepreneurship". Hope Village consists of a hospital, a primary school, a high school, a women's education centre, agricultural projects, a sanitation program, and a refuge for families. Mohamed is also a visiting lecturer at the African Leadership University School of Business, Rwanda.

== Awards and honours ==
- BET Social Humanitarian Award (2012) - awarded to Dr Hawa Abdi, Dr Amina Mohamed and Dr Deqo Mohamed
- Glamour Women of the Year (2010) - awarded to Dr Hawa Abdi, Dr Amina Mohamed and Dr Deqo Mohamed
- Chatham University Commencement Speaker (2017)

== Personal life ==
Mohamed married her husband, a physician, in 2012. Her father died in 2012 and her mother died in 2020.
