= Hawa Abdi =

Somali activist, physician (1947–2020)

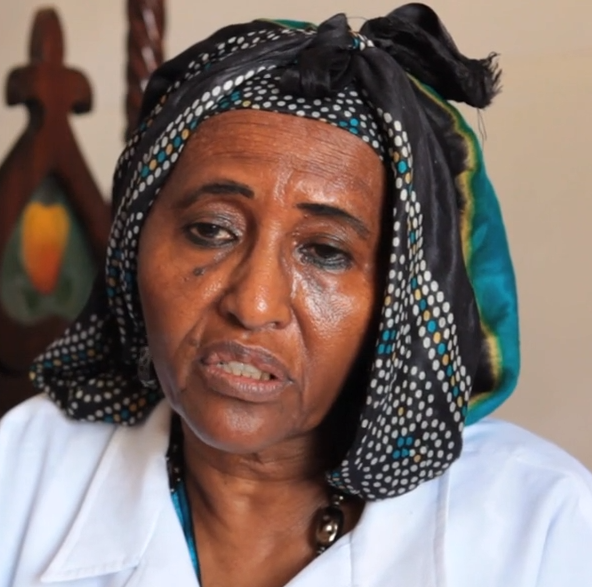
- Hawa Abdi in 2012
- Born: 17 May 1947; Mogadishu, Italian Somaliland
- Died: 5 August 2020 (aged 73); Mogadishu, Somalia
- Education: Somali National University
- Occupations: Activist; physician
- Website: dhaf.org

Hawa Abdi Dhiblawe (Somali: Xaawo Cabdi, Arabic: حواء عبدي, 17 May 1947 – 5 August 2020) was a Somali human rights activist and physician. She was the founder and chairperson of the Dr. Hawa Abdi Foundation (DHAF), a non-profit organization.

== Early years ==
Abdi was born in Mogadishu, and lived in south-central Somalia. Her mother died when she was 12 years old. Abdi thereafter took on family chores, including raising her four younger sisters. Her father was a professional who was employed in the port of the capital city.

For her early schooling, Abdi attended local elementary, intermediate and secondary academies. In 1964, she received a scholarship from the Women's Committee of the Soviet Union. Abdi subsequently studied medicine at a Kiev Medical Institute, graduating in 1971. The following year, she began law studies at Mogadishu's newly opened Somali National University. She would practice medicine during the morning and work toward her law degree in her spare time, eventually earning it in 1979.

== Personal life ==
When Abdi was twelve years old, she entered into a forced marriage with a significantly older man who was a police officer. The short-lived planned marriage ended several years later, before she left Somalia for Moscow and then, Kyiv. During her years in the USSR, she met Aden Mohammed, a fellow Somali student.

In 1973, Abdi married Aden and gave birth to her first child two years later. They had three children: Deqo, Amina, and Ahmed. Ahmed died in a 2005 car crash in Hargeisa, while on a visit to his father who had since separated from Abdi. Both Deqo and Amina became physicians.

Abdi died on 5 August 2020, at her home in Mogadishu. She was 73; no cause of death was specified.

== Career ==
=== Rural Health Development Organization ===
In 1983, Abdi opened the Rural Health Development Organization (RHDO) on family-owned land in the southern Lower Shebelle region. It began as a one-room clinic offering free obstetrician services to around 24 rural women per day, and later evolved into a 400-bed hospital.

When the civil war broke out in Somalia during the early 1990s, Abdi stayed behind at the behest of her grandmother, who had advised her to use her qualifications to assist the vulnerable. She subsequently established a new clinic and school for the displaced and orphans.

The RHDO was renamed the Dr. Hawa Abdi Foundation (DHAF) in 2007. It gradually expanded to include a relief camp, which during the 2011 drought housed 90,000 people on the 1,300 acres surrounding Abdi's hospital.

Two years prior, at the height of the Islamist insurgency in southern Somalia, militants had laid siege to the compound and attempted to force Abdi to shut it down. She stood her ground and the rebels left within a week, following pressure from local residents, the UN and other advocacy groups. The militants again stormed the area in February 2012, leading Abdi to temporarily suspend services until their eventual departure.

=== Dr. Hawa Abdi Foundation ===
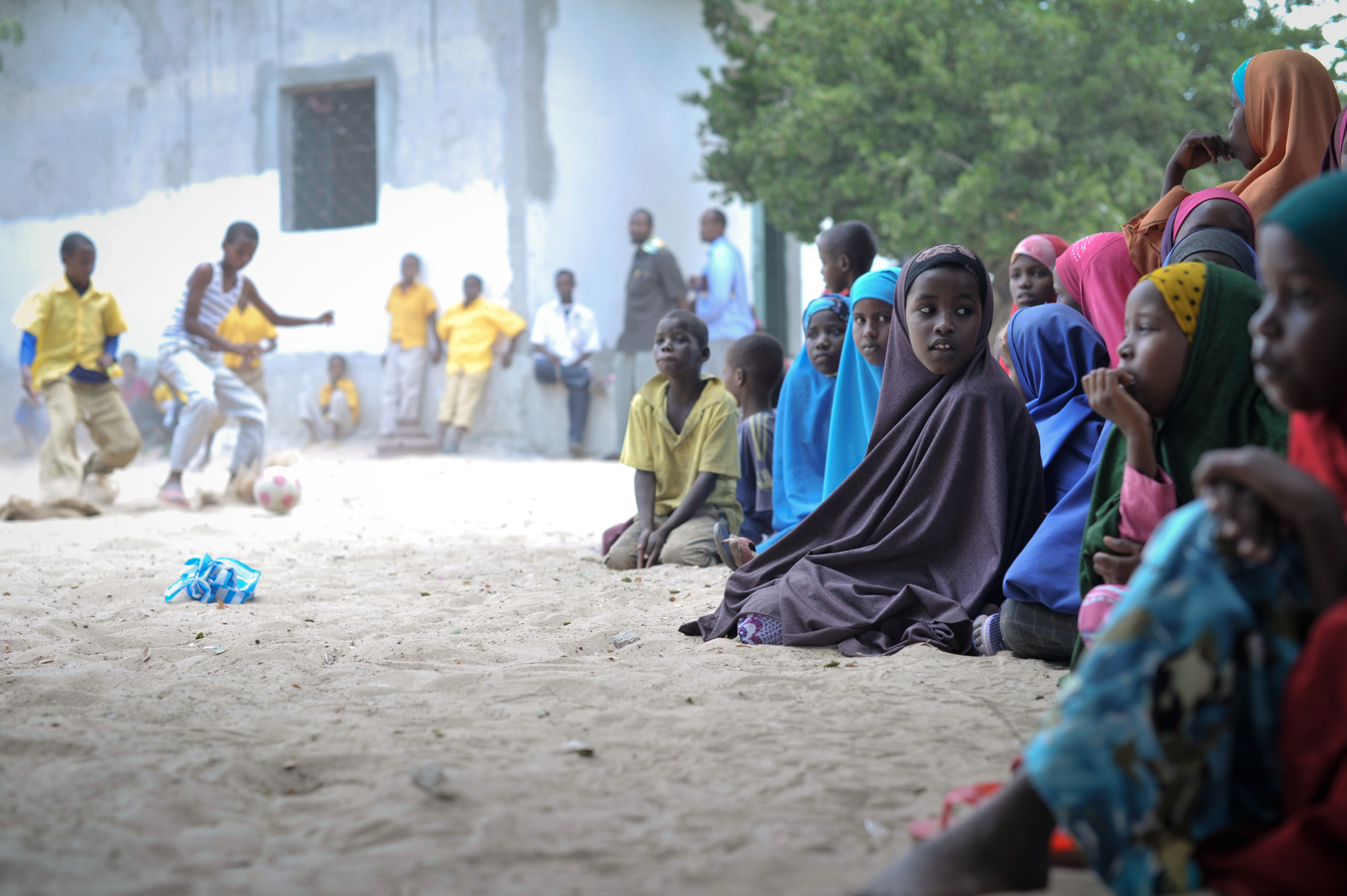
Hawa Abdi Center C

The Dr. Hawa Abdi Foundation (DHAF) was run by Abdi and her two physician daughters, CEO Deqo Adan (also known as Deqo Mohamed) and assistant Adan (also known as Amina Mohamed), who followed in their mother's footsteps as ob/gyn specialists. As of 2012, the organization has a multinational staff of 102 workers, augmented by a 150-member team comprising volunteers, fishermen and farmers.

DHAF is a non-political organization that is not affiliated with any government, political movement, religion or clan. DHAF decides what projects to undertake and what relief to provide based on the ground needs of the village. DHAF is also a financially independent organization. All of the funding is provided through donations from the people around the world and other charitable endowments. Government funding is prohibited. Since 1991, DHAF has provided services to Somalis who are independent of their clan. Services are provided to the people of Somalia at no cost.

The DHAF compound includes a hospital, school and nutritional center, and provides shelter, water and medical care to mostly women and children. Since its establishment in the early 1980s, the complex has served an estimated 2 million people.

Although services are offered at no charge, Abdi operates several fishing and agricultural projects within the compound to inculcate self-sustenance. The hospital also contains a small plot of land, where vegetables and maize are grown and later in part sold to cover some of the facility's maintenance costs.

Funding for the compound's equipment and medical supplies is mainly secured through remittances from Somali expatriates as well as general contributions to the DHAF. Since 2011, the organization has also received support from the Women in the World Foundation.

== Awards ==
Abdi was named Hiiraan Online's Person of the Year in 2007. Glamour magazine later named her and her two daughters among its 2010 "Women of the Year". Two years later, she was nominated for the Nobel Peace Prize. She also received the Women of Impact Award from the WITW Foundation, BET's Social Humanitarian Award, and the John Jay Medal for Justice.

In 2014, Abdi received the Roosevelt Four Freedoms Award in Middelburg, the Netherlands. She was conferred the Pilosio Building Peace Award one year later.

Abdi was granted an honorary Doctorate of Science by the University of Pennsylvania in May 2016. On 25 May of the following year, Abdi received the honorary Doctor of Laws degree from Harvard University.

== Works ==
- Keeping Hope Alive: One Woman—90,000 Lives Changed. New York City: Grand Central Publishing. 2013. ISBN 9781455599295.
