= Umoja (album) =

2006 studio album by BLØF

Studio album by BLØF
- Released: 3 March 2006
- Recorded: 2003–2005
- Length: 60:05
- Label: EMI
- Producer: BLØF, Holger Schwedt

BLØF chronology
Het Eind Van Het Begin (2005)	Umoja (2006)	XXS (2006)

Singles from Umoja
- 1. "Aanzoek Zonder Ringen" Released: 9 January 2006; 2. "Hemingway" Released: 5 May 2006; 3. "Mens" Released: September 2006; 4. "Een Manier Om Thuis Te Komen" Released: 17 November 2006; 5. "Donker Hart" Released: 2007

Umoja is the seventh studio album by the Dutch rock band BLØF, released on 3 March 2006. It was produced with the help of numerous international artists, with the band traveling to thirteen different countries for each of the tracks. Before its release, 50,000 copies of the album were pre-sold, and it became the number-one record sold in the Netherlands in the month after its release date. Umoja received double platinum certification. Its name is Swahili for "unity". The album was re-released in a special vinyl edition in 2016, with remastered tracks and four news songs.

== Documentary ==
A documentary film about the album was released in September 2007, titled Manier Om Thuis Te Komen – Umoja Live. It consists of a concert by the band at Nieuwe Luxor Theater in Rotterdam and contains the stories behind how and where the songs on the record were written. The film was directed by Van Houweninge jr. and bassist Peter Slager, and it was shown in cinemas on 20 September.

== Track listing ==
Track	Title	Made in	Recorded	Length
01	"Binnenstebuiten (Yele)"	Nairobi, Kenya	October 2003	6:03
02	"Mens"	Antalya, Turkey	December 2003	3:56
03	"Aanzoek Zonder Ringen"	Sado, Japan	September 2005	4:43
04	"Hemingway"	Havana, Cuba	March 2004	3:41
05	"Wennen Aan September"	New York City, United States	July 2004	4:19
06	"Geen Tango"	Buenos Aires, Argentina	January 2005	4:37
07	"Laag Bij De Grond"	Lagos, Nigeria	September 2004	4:21
08	"Herinnering Aan Later"	Óbidos, Portugal	June 2004	3:19
09	"Vreemde Wegen"	Celbridge, Ireland	October 2005	4:16
10	"Donker Hart"	St. Petersburg, Russia	November 2005	4:07
11	"Een Manier Om Thuis Te Komen"	Wangdue Phodrang, Bhutan	May 2005	5:11
12	"De Hemel Is De Aarde"	Adelaide River, Australia	September 2005	4:31
13	"Eén En Alleen"	New Delhi, India	March 2005	7:01

== Personnel ==
The thirteen countries where BLØF recorded Umoja

=== BLØF ===
- Paskal Jakobsen – vocals, guitar, mandolin
- Bas Kennis – keyboards, accordion, backing vocals
- Peter Slager – bass guitar
- Norman Bonink – drums, percussion, backing vocals

=== Additional musicians ===
==== Binnenstebuiten (Yele) ====
- Harry Kimani – vocals
- George Odero Achieng – orutu
- Ongeri "Magao" Magati – percussion
- Charles Obuya "Charlotti" Owino – percussion
- Wicyllffe Chagala "Kaboge" Idah – percussion
- Urvin Magarita – percussion

Lyrics translated by Harry Kimani

==== Mens ====
- Omar Faruk Tekbilek – zurna, bağlama, percussion

==== Aanzoek Zonder Ringen ====
- Kodo
  - Tsubasa Hori – oke gun
  - Eiichi Saito – oke daiko
  - Yoshie Sunahata – oke daiko
  - Tomohiro Mitome – chu daiko
  - Kazuki Imagai – chu daiko
  - Mitsuru Ishizuka – hirado

==== Hemingway ====
- Eliades Ochoa – vocals, guitar
- Alberto Rodriguez Pineda – tres
- Haruhiko Kono – quiro
- Gustav Klimt Kwartet
  - Arlia de Ruiter – first violin
  - Lorre Trytten – second violin
  - Mieke Honingh – viola
  - Bastiaan van der Werf – cello

Arrangement by Tom Bakker Lyrics translated by Annet Jimènez Rodriguez and Peter Slager

==== Wennen Aan September ====
- Counting Crows
  - Adam Duritz – vocals
  - David Immerglück – electric guitar, mandolin

Dutch lyrics by Peter Slager, English lyrics by Adam Duritz

==== Geen Tango ====
- Carel Kraayenhof – bandoneón
- Orquesta Tipica Sans Souci
  - Leonardo Ferreya – violin
  - Fabian Bertero – violin
  - Guillermo Ferreyra – violin
  - Sophie Lussi – violin
  - Felipe Ricciardi – bandoneón
  - Raúl Salvetti – bandoneón
  - Afredo Gomez – bandoneón
  - Eleonora Ferreyra – bandoneón
  - Silvio Acosta – double bass
  - Leonardo Fabricio Fernández – piano

Arrangement by Carel Kraayenhof and Tom Bakker

==== Laag Bij De Grond ====
- Femi Kuti – vocals, saxophone
- Saidi Obara – percussion
- Adekunle Adeyemi – percussion
- Tiwalade Ogunlowo – trombone
- Emmanuel Abowoba – saxophone
- Olugbenga Laleye – trumpet
- Tayo Olajide – vocals, dancing
- Anthonia Bernards – vocals, dancing
- Yemi Oriyomi – vocals, dancing
- Comfort Adenike Michael – vocals, dancing
- Olayinka Anjorin – vocals, dancing

==== Herinnering Aan Later ====
- Cristina Branco – vocals
- Custódio Castelo – Portuguese guitar

Lyrics translated by Mila Vidal Paletti, Cristina Branco, and Peter Slager

==== Vreemde Wegen ====
- Terry Woods – bouzouki, concertina
- Paul Harrigan – uilleann pipes, tin whistle
- Shane Martin – bodhrán

==== Donker Hart ====
- Natalia Sergeeva – violin
- Liana Zingarenko – violin
- Olga Vikovisheva – viola
- Liubov Pavlova – cello
- Elena Abrosimova – double bass

Arrangement by Peter Bauwens

==== Een Manier Om Thuis Te Komen ====
- Jigme Drukpa – vocals, dranyen, lingm
- Ugyen Tshewang – cymbals
- Dung Norbu – French horn
- Tsagay – horn
- Tashi Wangchuk – drum

==== De Hemel Is De Aarde ====
- Mark Atkins – didgeridoo
- Mark Robinson – didgeridoo
- Bronson – vocals, clapsticks

==== Eén En Alleen ====
- Pravin Godkhindi – bansuri
- Rafiuddin Sabri – tabla
- L. Kishore Kumar – sitar
- Santosh Mishra – sarangi
- Dhroeh Nankoe – vocals
