= Bløf =

Dutch rock band

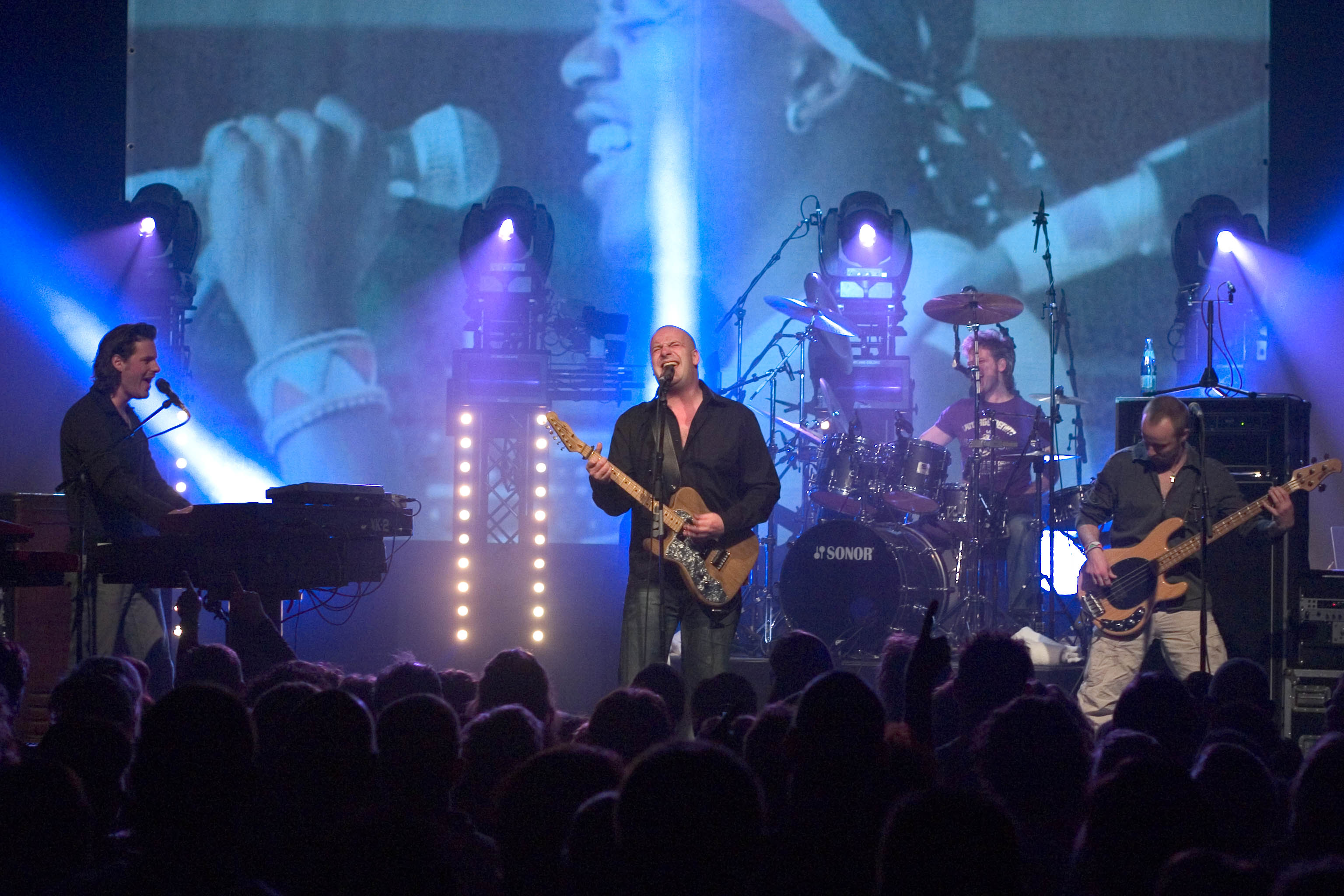
- Bløf performing in 2006

Background information
- Origin: Vlissingen, Netherlands
- Genres: Rock; pop
- Works: Bløf discography
- Years active: 1992–present
- Labels: EMI; Capitol
- Members: Paskal Jakobsen; Peter Slager; Bas Kennis; Norman Bonink
- Past members: Henk Tjoonk; Chris Götte
- Website: blof.nl

Bløf (pronounced [blʏf]; stylised in all caps) is a Dutch rock band founded in Vlissingen, Zeeland, by bassist Peter Slager. It currently consists of Slager, Paskal Jakobsen (lead vocals and guitar), Bas Kennis (keyboards), and Norman Bonink (drums). Former members are drummers Henk Tjoonk and Chris Götte. The band's four members write the music together, but Slager is solely responsible for lyrics.

Bløf has been recognised as "by far the most successful Dutch-speaking group of all time" and "the most successful Zeeland group". They were the fourth Dutch band to attain 40 hit singles on the Dutch Top 40, and they have two number-one songs: "Holiday in Spain" with American band Counting Crows (five weeks, 2004) and "Zoutelande" with Belgian singer Geike Arnaert (ten weeks, 2018).

The band's first hit was "Liefs uit Londen", in 1998. Drummer Chris Götte was killed in a motorcycle accident in 2001 and succeeded by Bonink. In 2006, they became the first rock band to play in Bhutan, and their concert was the biggest in terms of attendance that the country had seen to date. Bløf has also won eight Edison Awards, including "Best Band in the Netherlands" five times.

== Biography ==
=== Beginnings ===
Bløf was founded in 1992 by Peter Slager and originally consisted of Slager on bass guitar, Paskal Jakobsen on guitar, Bas Kennis on keyboards, and Henk Tjoonk on drums.

They recorded their 1994 debut album, Naakt Onder De Hemel, in just one week. The self-produced, self-promoted album was a hit in their home province of Zeeland, and the single "Aan de Kust" became a local hit, despite receiving little airplay on national radio stations. The album was well received by critics, and through this positive attention, the band secured a national distribution contract with EMI Music, Keyboardist Kennis credits their early success partly to the rudimentary website they had in 1995, giving fans access to the band and a direct way to find out about their music and tour dates. For this album, Bløf received a "Best New Talent" award, and with the prize money, they worked on their second record, Helder, which came out in September 1997.

=== Initial success with EMI ===
In 1997, internal struggles almost led to the band's breakup and saw drummer Tjoonk fired and replaced by Chris Götte. With the help of ex-Doe Maar manager Frank van der Meijden, the band landed a recording contract with EMI. The first single released after these changes, "Liefs uit Londen", was a national success. It became the band's first hit on the Dutch Top 40, reaching No. 13. The song was inspired by the childhood board game Reis om de Wereld ("journey around the world").

=== Breakthrough ===
In 1998, Bløf released XXL Live Met Het Zeeuws Orkest, a live album recorded with an orchestra from Zeeland. With the help of Peter Bauwers (2 Unlimited) and Ronald Vanhuffel, they published the studio album Boven. In 2000, the band received an Edison Award for Best Dutch Band. They followed up in 2001 with Watermakers and once more received an Edison for Best Dutch Band.

On 17 March 2001, drummer Chris Götte was killed in a motorcycle accident while on his way to the venue where the band was scheduled to perform later that day; he was 38. The band took a hiatus from performing, and one year later, they released the live CD Oog In Oog — Live I in Ahoy, the last concert with Götte. Norman Bonink, who had previously played with Frank Boeijen, took over on drums. The band's next album, Blauwe Ruis, released in 2002, was dedicated to Götte and his family, and the singles "Dichterbij dan Ooit" and "Blauwe Ruis" dealt with his death.

In 2003, Bløf issued their next record, Omarm. A year later, the American rock band Counting Crows toured with Bløf, and together, they re-recorded the Counting Crows song "Holiday in Spain", with lyrics in both English and Dutch, which gave Bløf exposure in the United States. The collaboration was a request from Universal Records, but Bløf had been longtime fans of Counting Crows, and Adam Duritz specifically requested a bilingual version of the song.

In 2005, Bløf travelled around the world in order to be exposed to new cultures and inspirations for a new album. These efforts saw the release of Umoja in 2006, which aimed to raise awareness of the Millennium Development Goals. The band collaborated with artists from the 12 countries they visited. The project resulted in a book, Umoja Travel Lodge, concerts in the Netherlands, and a DVD of those concerts, together with a number of international musicians from the project. The band later stated that they greatly underestimated the amount of work involved with a project of that scale. They played the first rock show in the history of Bhutan, which in 2006 was the largest concert in terms of attendance that the country had seen up to that point.

Bløf's next album, Oktober, came out in October 2008, with enough additional material for a follow-up, April, which was released in early 2009. Their subsequent record, titled Alles Blijft Anders, came out in February 2011.

In 2016, Slager issued the solo album Slik.

In April 2017, Bløf put out Aan, a record featuring a collaboration with rapper Typhoon and a tribute to Thé Lau, the frontman of the Scene and close friend of Jakobsen's, who had died in 2015. "Zoutelande", a Dutch cover of the German song "Frankfurt Oder" by Bosse, was rerecorded as a duet with Belgian singer Geike Arnaert. It reached No. 1 in January 2018 and stayed there for more than ten weeks. Later in 2018, Bløf released the single "Omarm me" in collaboration with Dutch rapper Ronnie Flex. The surprise success of "Zoutelande" led to Bløf headlining Pinkpop Festival in 2018.

Bløf celebrated their 30th anniversary in 2022, with Slager attributing their survival to a lack of financial disputes. While Slager is entitled to 62.5% of the band's revenue per Dutch copyright law as the band's sole lyricist, he divides all compensation equally among the four members. That year, they released their 14th studio album, titled Polaroid.

== Legacy ==
Bløf is considered the most successful Dutch-speaking musical group of all time and the most popular group from the province of Zeeland. From 1998 to 2014, they recorded one hit on the Dutch Top 40 every single year. With "Horizon" in 2021, they became the fourth Dutch band to achieve 40 placements on the Top 40, after BZN, Golden Earring, and Normaal.

=== Criticism ===
The band has also carried a negative reputation among some Dutch people, specifically facing criticism for Slager's lyrics. In 2015, Vice wrote that "since Kane no longer exists, Bløf has been the most hated band in the Netherlands." A television special by the news programme EenVandaag, celebrating the band's 20th anniversary, was scrapped because the director invoked a popular Twitter account criticising Bløf's lyrics, which caused the band's manager to reject those questions. The Dutch nightlife website Partyscene in 2018 named Bløf the second-most hated Dutch act, for their "crooked lyrics" and "the rutting bluster of singer Paskal". De Volkskrant reported on renewed hate for Bløf and other pop artists following the surprise success of "Zoutelande" in 2018.

However, Slager won the Lennaert Nijgh Prize (for best Dutch lyricist) in 2017, and the jury said that "He takes a subtle approach, making many of his texts multi-interpretable. The very fact that everyone can have their own experience with a text by Peter plays an important role in Bløf's success." Slager has responded to his critics, saying, "Whether I succeed is not up to me", and noted that his upbringing in Zeeland has influenced his recurring usage of maritime symbolism.

== Band members ==
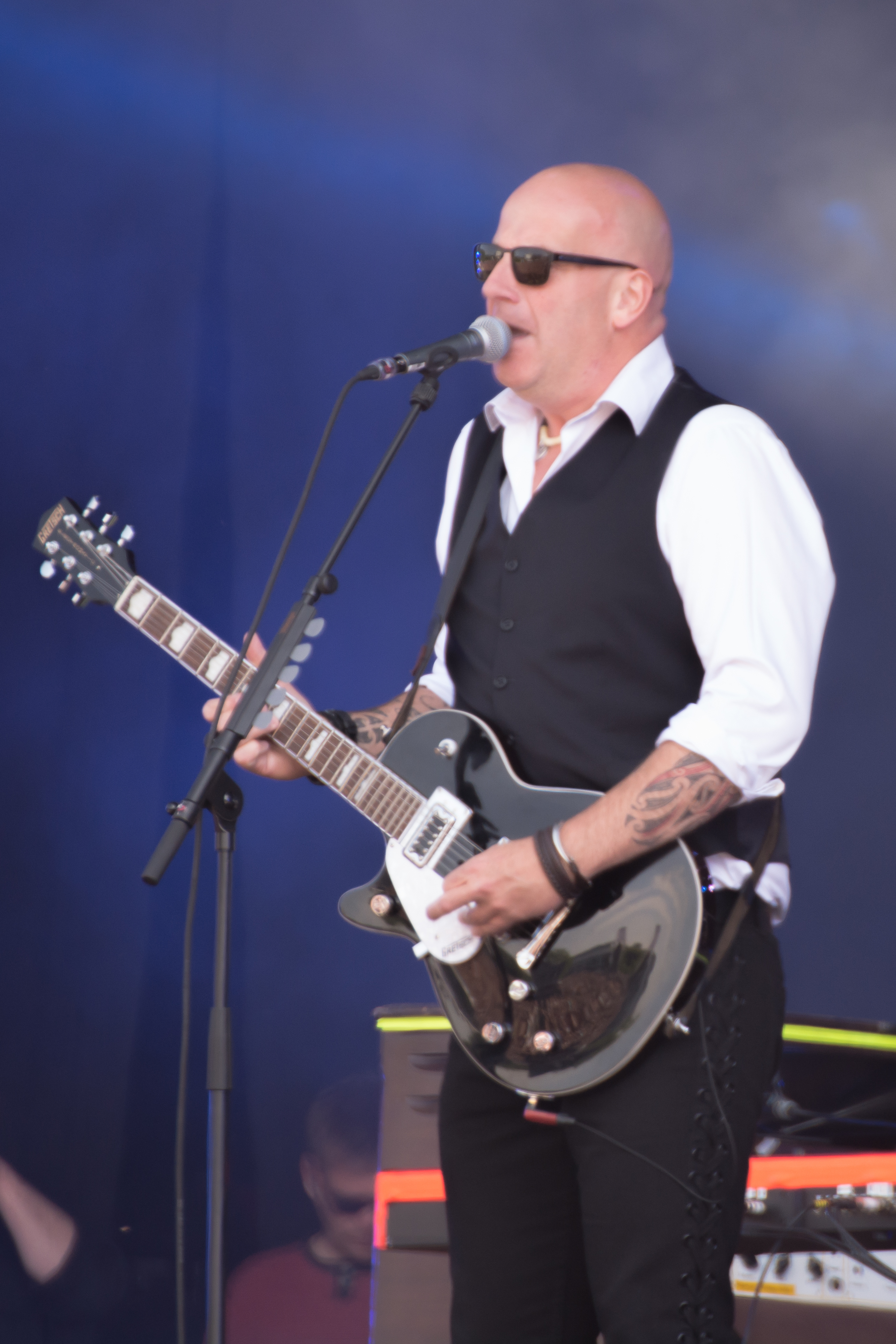
Paskal Jakobsen

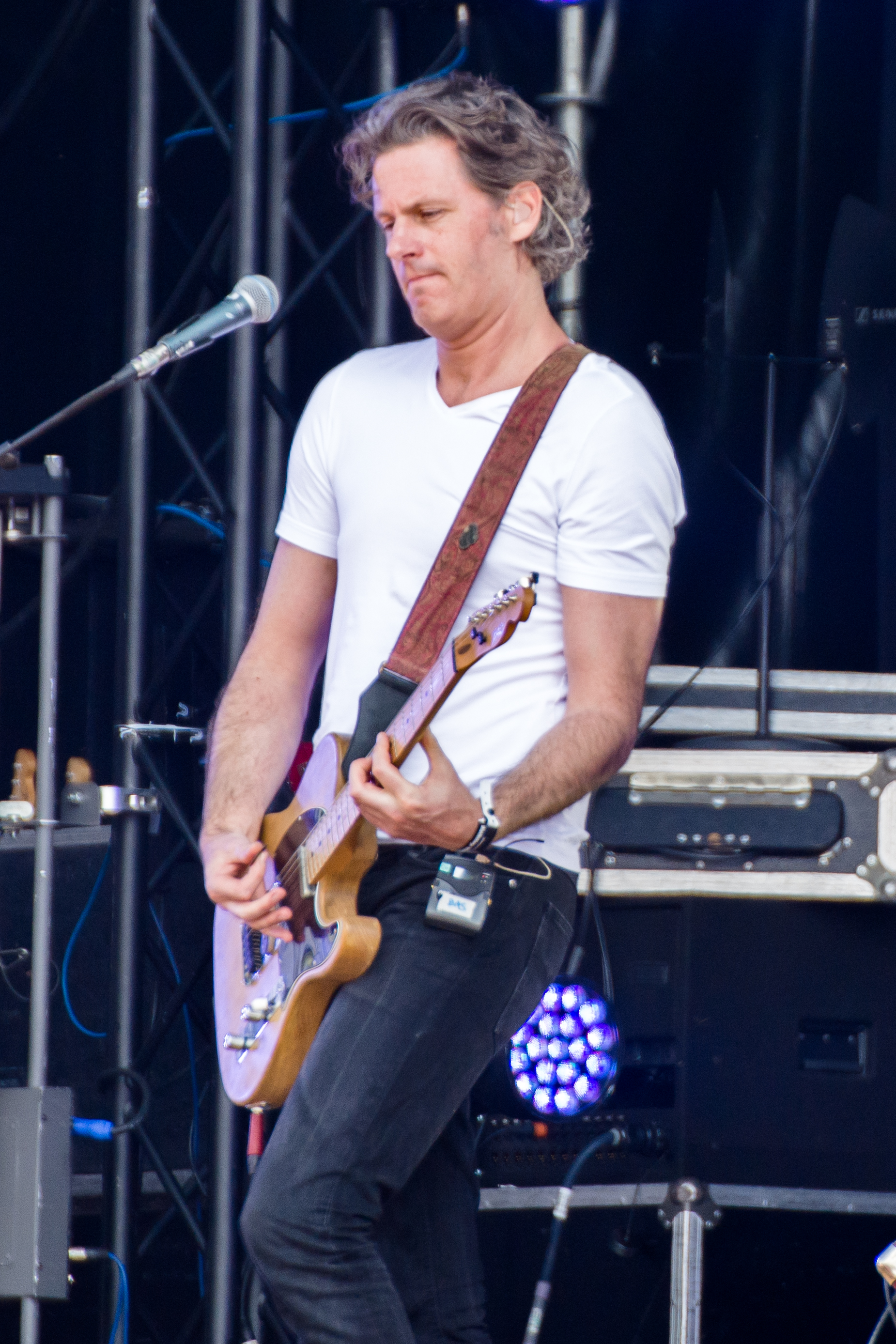
Bas Kennis

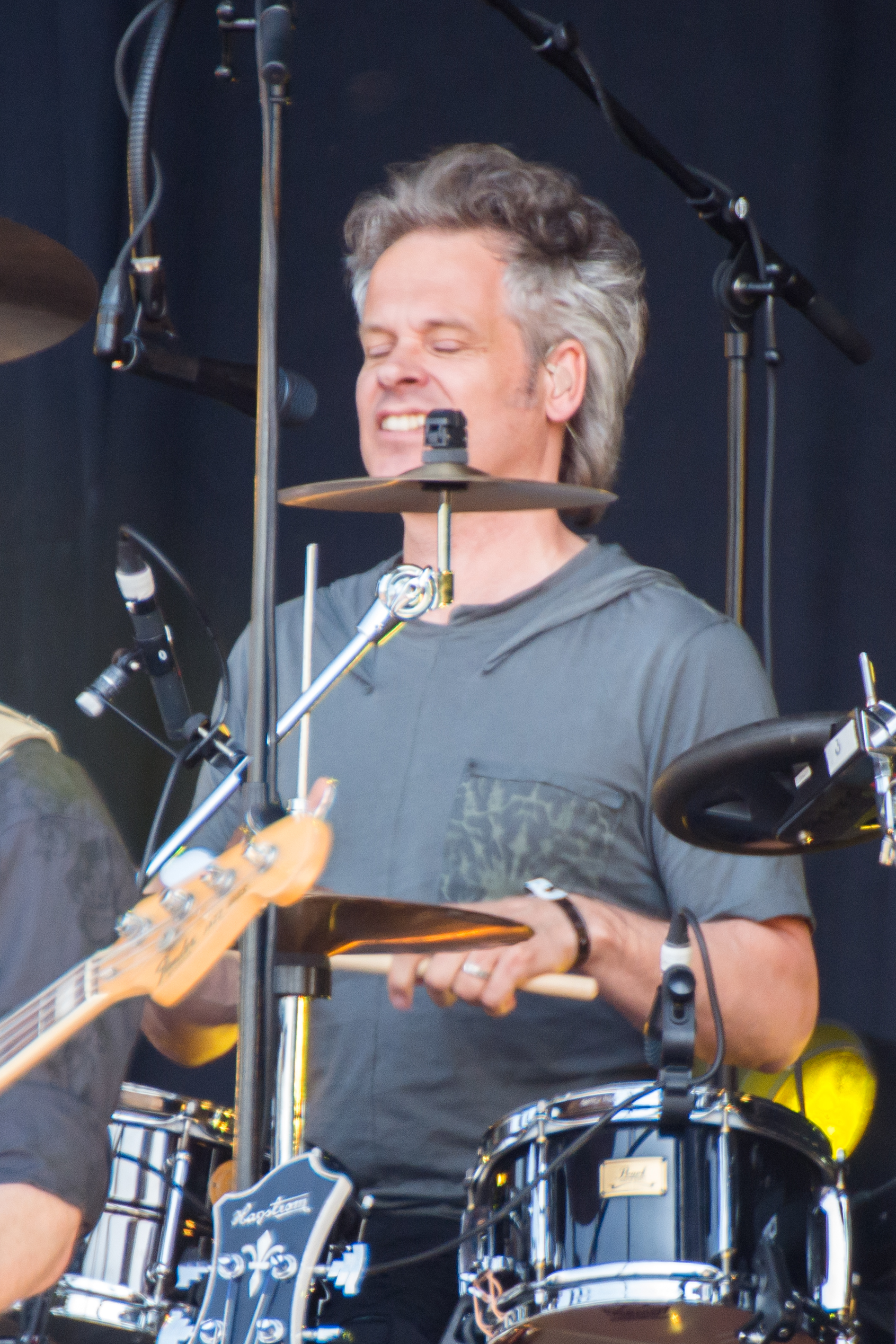
Norman Bonink

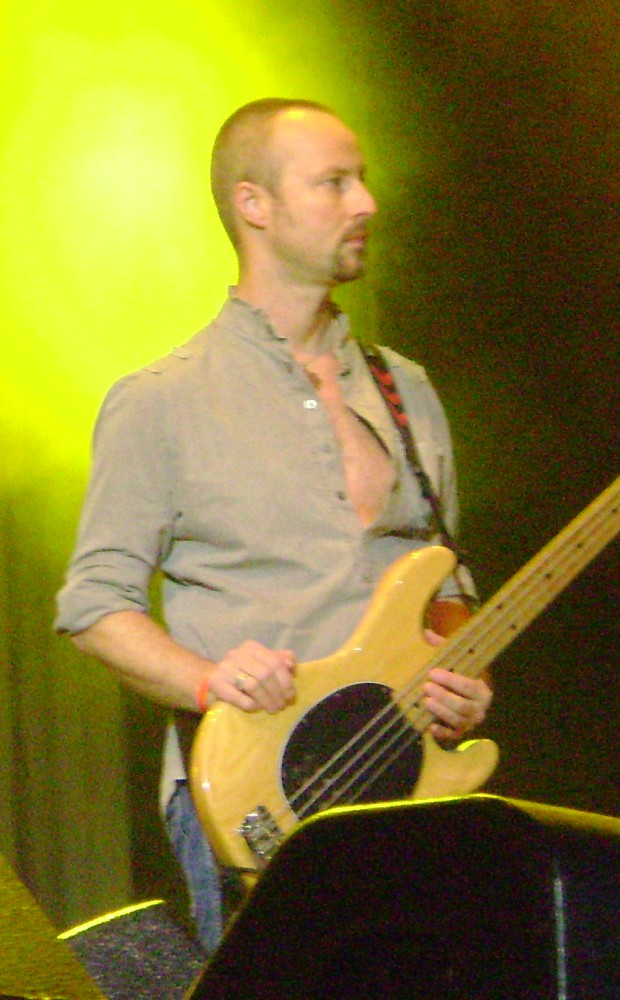
Peter Slager

=== Lineups ===
(1992–1997)	Paskal Jakobsen – lead vocals, guitar; Bas Kennis – keyboard, backing vocals; Peter Slager – bass, backing vocals; Henk Tjoonk – percussion, backing vocals
(1997–2001)	Paskal Jakobsen – lead vocals, guitar; Bas Kennis – keyboard, backing vocals; Peter Slager – bass, backing vocals; Chris Götte – percussion, backing vocals
(2001–present)	Paskal Jakobsen – lead vocals, guitar; Bas Kennis – keyboard, guitar, backing vocals; Peter Slager – bass, backing vocals; Norman Bonink – percussion, backing vocals

== Discography ==
- Naakt onder de hemel (1995)
- Helder (1997)
- Boven (1999)
- Watermakers (2000)
- Blauwe Ruis (2002)
- Omarm (2003)
- Umoja (2006)
- Oktober (2008)
- April (2009)
- Alles Blijft Anders (2011)
- In Het Midden van Alles (2014)
- De Grasbroek Sessies (2015)
- Aan (2017)
- Polaroid (2022)
