= France in the Eurovision Song Contest 2023 =

- Eurovision Song Contest 2023
- Participating broadcaster: France Télévisions
- Country: France
- Selection process: Internal selection
- Announcement date: Artist: 12 January 2023; Song: 19 February 2023

Competing entry
- Song: "Évidemment"
- Artist: La Zarra
- Songwriters: Fatima Zahra Hafdi; Ahmed Saghir; Yannick Rastogi; Zacharie Raymond

Placement
- Final result: 16th, 104 points

Participation chronology

France was represented at the Eurovision Song Contest 2023 with the song "Évidemment", written by Fatima Zahra Hafdi, Ahmed Saghir, Yannick Rastogi, and Zacharie Raymond, and performed by Hafdi herself under her stage name La Zarra. The French participating broadcaster, France Télévisions, internally selected its entry for the contest. La Zarra was officially announced by France 2 as the French entrant on 12 January 2023, and the song was presented to the public on 19 February 2023, during the France 2 programme 20h30 le dimanche.

As a member of the "Big Five", France automatically qualified to compete in the final of the Eurovision Song Contest.

== Background ==
Prior to the 2023 contest, France Télévisions and its predecessor national broadcasters have participated in the Eurovision Song Contest representing France sixty-four times since RTF's debut in the inaugural contest. They first won the contest in 1958 with "Dors, mon amour" performed by André Claveau. In the 1960s, they won three times, with "Tom Pillibi" performed by Jacqueline Boyer in 1960, "Un premier amour" performed by Isabelle Aubret in 1962, and "Un jour, un enfant" performed by Frida Boccara, who won in 1969 in a four-way tie with the Netherlands, Spain, and the United Kingdom. France's fifth victory came in 1977 when Marie Myriam won with the song "L'oiseau et l'enfant". France has also finished second five times, with Paule Desjardins in 1957, Catherine Ferry in 1976, Joëlle Ursull in 1990, Amina in 1991 (who lost out to Sweden's Carola in a tie-break), and Barbara Pravi in 2021. In the 21st century, France has had less success, only making the top ten five times, with Natasha St-Pier finishing fourth in 2001, Sandrine François finishing fifth in 2002, Patricia Kaas finishing eighth in 2009, Amir finishing sixth in 2016, and Pravi finishing second in 2021 with 499 points. In 2022, the nation finished in twenty-fourth place with the song "Fulenn" performed by Alvan and Ahez.

As part of its duties as participating broadcaster, France Télévisions organises the selection of its entry in the Eurovision Song Contest and broadcasts the event in the country through France 2. The French broadcasters has used both national finals and internal selections to choose its entry in the past. In 2021 and 2022, the entries were selected via the national final Eurovision France, c'est vous qui décidez !.

== Before Eurovision ==
=== Internal selection ===
Initially, France 2 announced in July 2022 that the French entry for the Eurovision Song Contest 2023 would be selected via the national final Eurovision France, c'est vous qui décidez! However, on 12 January 2023, it was reported that the national final had been cancelled, and soon later the broadcaster announced that it had internally selected La Zarra, a Canadian singer and songwriter of Moroccan descent based in France, as the French entrant for the contest. Her competing song, "Évidemment", written by Ahmed Saghir, Yannick Rastogi, Zacharie Raymond, and La Zarra herself, was presented to the public on 19 February 2023 during a pre-recorded showcase performance, broadcast on France 2 during the programme 20h30 le dimanche and hosted by Laurent Delahousse. The French Head of Delegation for the Eurovision Song Contest, Alexandra Redde-Amiel, commented on the selection:

"From our first meeting, La Zarra won us over! What an honour to welcome this great artist in the Eurovision family! Mysterious, inspiring, charismatic, La Zarra is a woman and a modern artist with a chic French signature! A voice that transports us through time by making us travel to different eras. From Barbara through Brel or Dalida to Marylin Monroe, La Zarra is an iconic artist who will carry the colors of France in Liverpool in May 2023 during the largest song contest in the world."

— Alexandra Redde-Amiel

== At Eurovision ==
According to Eurovision rules, all nations with the exceptions of the host country and the "Big Five" (France, Germany, Italy, Spain, and the United Kingdom) are required to qualify from one of two semi-finals in order to compete in the final; the top ten countries from each semi-final progress to the final. As a member of the "Big Five", France automatically qualified to compete in the final on 13 May 2023. In addition to its participation in the final, France was also required to broadcast and vote in one of the two semi-finals. This was decided via a draw held during the semi-final allocation draw on 31 January 2023, when it was announced that France would be voting in the first semi-final.

France Télévisions broadcast all three shows live on its channels; the two semi-finals were shown on Culturebox with commentary provided by André Manoukian and France's 2012 participant Anggun, while the final was aired on France 2 with commentary by Laurence Boccolini and Stéphane Bern. The broadcast of the final reached a total of 3.48 million people in France, a 10% increase on viewing figures for the 2022 contest and representing a 25.6% market share of television viewers over the age of 4.

=== Voting ===
==== Points awarded to France ====
Points awarded to France (Final)
Score	Televote	Jury
12 points		
10 points	Armenia	Sweden
8 points	Norway	
7 points		Finland; Armenia
6 points		Denmark; Lithuania
5 points		Ireland; Spain
4 points	Iceland	Serbia
3 points	Albania; Cyprus; Greece; Romania; Slovenia	Netherlands
2 points	Australia; Belgium; Portugal; Sweden	
1 point	Israel; Lithuania; Malta; Rest of the World; Serbia	Belgium

==== Points awarded by France ====
Points awarded by France (Semi-final)
Score	Televote
12 points	Portugal
10 points	Moldova
8 points	Israel
7 points	Finland
6 points	Switzerland
5 points	Sweden
4 points	Czech Republic
3 points	Latvia
2 points	Serbia
1 point	Norway

Points awarded by France (Final)
Score	Televote	Jury
12 points	Armenia	Israel
10 points	Israel	Austria
8 points	Moldova	Finland
7 points	Italy	Armenia
6 points	Finland	Sweden
5 points	Portugal	Portugal
4 points	Ukraine	Czech Republic
3 points	Sweden	Switzerland
2 points	Belgium	Italy
1 point	Norway	Ukraine

==== Detailed voting results ====
The following members comprised the French jury:

- Alexandre Pipieri
- Julien Comblat
- Catherine Sadok
- Elsa Najar
- Zaïa Haddouche

Detailed voting results from France (Semi-final 1)
R/O	Country	Televote	
R/O	Country	Rank	Points
01	Norway	10	1
02	Malta	12	
03	Serbia	9	2
04	Latvia	8	3
05	Portugal	1	12
06	Ireland	13	
07	Croatia	11	
08	Switzerland	5	6
09	Israel	3	8
10	Moldova	2	10
11	Sweden	6	5
12	Azerbaijan	15	
13	Czech Republic	7	4
14	Netherlands	14	
15	Finland	4	7

Detailed voting results from France (Final)
R/O	Country	Jury							Televote	
R/O	Country	Juror 1	Juror 2	Juror 3	Juror 4	Juror 5	Rank	Points	Rank	Points
01	Austria	6	3	5	3	4	2	10	25	
02	Portugal	3	4	10	5	12	6	5	6	5
03	Switzerland	4	12	9	6	8	8	3	16	
04	Poland	18	20	16	14	14	20		13	
05	Serbia	19	19	24	17	19	23		21	
06	France									
07	Cyprus	8	21	25	16	15	18		20	
08	Spain	10	6	22	8	18	11		12	
09	Sweden	1	5	2	9	13	5	6	8	3
10	Albania	20	22	21	22	17	24		11	
11	Italy	7	14	3	15	11	9	2	4	7
12	Estonia	12	7	20	21	10	14		22	
13	Finland	9	1	7	2	6	3	8	5	6
14	Czech Republic	11	8	6	1	16	7	4	15	
15	Australia	17	23	19	18	5	15		23	
16	Belgium	21	13	8	11	9	12		9	2
17	Armenia	5	2	4	10	3	4	7	1	12
18	Moldova	13	24	13	23	20	21		3	8
19	Ukraine	14	18	18	19	2	10	1	7	4
20	Norway	22	15	11	12	7	13		10	1
21	Germany	25	25	17	25	21	25		14	
22	Lithuania	15	9	12	20	24	17		19	
23	Israel	2	11	1	4	1	1	12	2	10
24	Slovenia	16	16	23	7	23	16		17	
25	Croatia	23	17	14	24	22	22		18	
26	United Kingdom	24	10	15	13	25	19		24	
