= Belgium in the Eurovision Song Contest 2023 =

- Eurovision Song Contest 2023
- Participating broadcaster: Vlaamse Radio- en Televisieomroeporganisatie (VRT)
- Country: Belgium
- Selection process: Eurosong 2023
- Selection date: 14 January 2023

Competing entry
- Song: "Because of You"
- Artist: Gustaph
- Songwriters: Stef Caers; Jaouad Alloul

Placement
- Semi-final result: Qualified (8th, 90 points)
- Final result: 7th, 182 points

Participation chronology

Belgium was represented at the Eurovision Song Contest 2023 with the song "Because of You", written by Stef Caers and Jaouad Alloul, and performed by Caers himself under his stage name Gustaph. The Belgian participating broadcaster, Flemish Vlaamse Radio- en Televisieomroeporganisatie (VRT), organised the national final Eurosong 2023 to select its entry for the contest. The competition featured seven competing acts and consisted of five songclub shows and a final. In the final on 14 January 2023, "Because of You" performed by Gustaph was selected as the winner via the votes of a fifteen-member jury panel and a public vote.

Belgium was drawn to compete in the second semi-final of the Eurovision Song Contest which took place on 11 May 2023. Performing during the show in position 5, "Because of You" was announced among the top 10 entries of the second semi-final and therefore qualified to compete in the final on 13 May. It was later revealed that Belgium placed eighth out of the 16 participating countries in the semi-final with 90 points. In the final, Belgium performed in position 16 and placed seventh out of the 26 participating countries, scoring 182 points.

== Background ==
Prior to the 2023 contest, Belgium had participated in the Eurovision Song Contest sixty-three times since its debut as one of seven countries to take part in 1956. Since then, the country has won the contest on one occasion in 1986 with the song "J'aime la vie" performed by Sandra Kim. Following the introduction of semi-finals for the 2004 contest, Belgium had been featured in eight finals. In 2022, "Miss You" by Jérémie Makiese represented the nation, qualifying for the final and placing 19th.

The Belgian participation in the contest alternates between two broadcasters: Flemish Vlaamse Radio- en Televisieomroeporganisatie (VRT) and Walloon Radio-télévision belge de la Communauté française (RTBF) at the time, with both broadcasters sharing the broadcasting rights. Both broadcasters –and their predecessors– had selected the Belgian entry using national finals and internal selections in the past. On 4 July 2022, VRT –who had the turn– confirmed its intention to participate in the 2023 contest and announced on 20 August 2022 that the Eurosong national final would be held to select their entry. This marked the return of Eurosong for the first time since 2016.

== Before Eurovision ==
=== Eurosong 2023 ===
Eurosong 2023 was the national final that selected the Belgian entry in the Eurovision Song Contest 2023. The competition consisted of five pre-recorded songclub shows that was broadcast between 9 and 13 January 2023, followed by a live final on 14 January 2023 where the winning song and artist was selected. All six shows was hosted by Peter Van de Veire and broadcast on Eén, as well as on the broadcaster's online streaming platform VRT Max.

==== Format ====
Seven artists were sought to compete in Eurosong. The competition included five songclub shows that were broadcast between 9 and 13 January 2023. The shows featured each artist presenting their two candidate Eurovision songs in front of the six other artists that gave advice on which song should be selected for the final. Based on the advice, the artist selected one of the two songs to proceed to the final. The final took place on 14 January 2023 where the winner was chosen by an expert jury and public televoting.

The jury panel consisted of:

- Alexander Rybak – Norwegian singer, winner of the 2009 contest
- Nikkie de Jager – Dutch makeup artist and YouTuber, co-host of the 2021 contest
- Laura Tesoro – singer and actress, represented Belgium in 2016
- Jérémie Makiese – singer, represented Belgium in 2022
- Laura Govaerts – presenter at MNM
- Ann Reymen – presenter at Radio 2
- Korneel de Clercq – presenter at Radio 1
- Thibault Christiaensen – presenter at Studio Brussel
- Francisco Schuster – actor, singer and dancer
- Leslie Cable – Eurovision Head of Delegation for Wallonian broadcaster RTBF
- Jasper van Biesen – author of 65 Years of Belgium at the Eurovision Song Contest
- Stephan Monsieur – chairman of OGAE Belgium
- André Vermeulen – journalist and Eurovision specialist
- Els Germonpré – music coordinator for Eén
- Manu Lammens – music manager of MNM

==== Competing entries ====
The names of the seven acts selected for the competition were announced on 8 November 2022 during the radio MNM programme Kawtar & Keyaert. Among the competing artists was former Eurovision Song Contest participant Tom Dice (member of the Starlings), who represented Belgium in 2010. The artists were selected by an A&R Team (Arts and Repertoire) consisting of music experts from VRT in consultation with record labels and artist managers. The candidate Eurovision songs to be performed by the artists were announced on 15 December 2022, along with 20-second snippets of each entry.

Artist	Song	Songwriter(s)
Loredana	"Dream in Colours"	Tim Gosden, Maria Broberg, Tristan Henry, Loredana De Amicis, Serge Ramaekers
Loredana	"You Lift Me Up"	Udo Mechels, Loredana De Amicis, John Miles Jr., Pat Krimson
Chérine	"Mon étoile"	Chérine Mroue, Hans Francken, Domien Cnockaert
Chérine	"Ça m'ennuie pas"	Chérine Mroue, William Rousseau, François Welgryn
Hunter Falls	"Ooh La La"	Tchiah Ommar Abdulrahman, Michael Garvin, Christoffer Jonsson, John-Emil Johansson, Liam Erixon
Hunter Falls	"Home"	Tchiah Ommar Abdulrahman, Thomas "TK" Karlsson, Douglas Thiele
Ameerah	"Armageddon"	Astrid Roelants, Zac Poor, Ellen Wilcox
Ameerah	"The Carnival"	Astrid Roelants, Zac Poor, Ellen Wilcox
Gala Dragot	"Emotion Ollie"	Max Robert Baby, Gala Aliaj
Gala Dragot	"T'inquiète"	Jan Lemmens, Yello Staelens, Gala Aliaj, Pepijn Leenders
Gustaph	"Because of You"	Stef Caers, Jaouad Alloul
Gustaph	"The Nail"	Stef Caers
The Starlings	"Oceanside"	Kato Callebaut, Tom Eeckhout, Jeroen Swinnen, Ashley Hicklin
The Starlings	"Rollercoaster"	Kato Callebaut, Tom Eeckhout, Laurell Barker, Thomas Stengaard, Andreas Stone Johansson, Anderz Wrethov, Anna Grey

==== Songclub shows ====
The five songclub shows were recorded in Tournai and aired between 9 and 13 January 2023. During the shows each of the competing artists performed their two candidate songs for the 2023 Eurovision Song Contest and selected one of them to qualify to the final, taking into account the advice given by the other artists. All acts with the exception of the Starlings ultimately followed the advice of the songclub.

Songclub shows – 9–13 January 2023
Broadcast	Artist	R/O	Song	Result
9 January	Loredana	1	"Dream in Colours"	Eliminated
9 January	Loredana	2	"You Lift Me Up"	Advanced
10 January	Chérine	1	"Mon étoile"	Eliminated
10 January	Chérine	2	"Ça m'ennuie pas"	Advanced
10 January	Hunter Falls	1	"Ooh La La"	Advanced
11 January	Hunter Falls	2	"Home"	Eliminated
11 January	Ameerah	1	"Armageddon"	Eliminated
11 January	Ameerah	2	"The Carnival"	Advanced
12 January	Gala Dragot	1	"Emotion Ollie"	Eliminated
12 January	Gala Dragot	2	"T'inquiète"	Advanced
12 January	Gustaph	1	"Because of You"	Advanced
13 January	Gustaph	2	"The Nail"	Eliminated
13 January	The Starlings	1	"Oceanside"	Eliminated
13 January	The Starlings	2	"Rollercoaster"	Advanced

==== Final ====
The final took place on 14 January 2023 at the Palais 12 in Brussels. Each artist performed their selected candidate Eurovision song and the winner, "Because of You" performed by Gustaph, was selected by the combination of results from an expert jury and a public televote. The public and the jury each had a total of 780 points to award. Each member of the jury awarded points from 4-8, 10 and 12, while the televote awarded points based on the percentage of votes each song achieved. For example, if a song gained 10% of the viewer vote, then that entry would be awarded 10% of 780 points rounded to the nearest integer: 78 points. Four members of the jury also provided commentary and feedback to the songs during the show: Alexander Rybak, Nikkie de Jager, Laura Tesoro and Jérémie Makiese.

In addition to the competing entries, the show was opened with a medley of past Eurovision songs performed by the competing artists: Ameerah performed "Euphoria", Gala Dragot performed "Rhythm Inside", Gustaph performed "Waterloo", Loredana performed "Rise Like a Phoenix", Hunter Falls performed "Heroes", Chérine performed "Voilà", the Starlings performed "Snap" and all artists together performed "Baby Baby". The interval acts included past Eurovision winners Duncan Laurence and Rybak performing their winning songs "Arcade" and "Fairytale", respectively.

Final – 14 January 2023
R/O	Artist	Song	Jury	Televote	Total	Place
1	Hunter Falls	"Ooh La La"	84	44	128	7
2	Chérine	"Ça m'ennuie pas"	145	123	268	4
3	The Starlings	"Rollercoaster"	94	183	277	2
4	Ameerah	"The Carnival"	107	64	171	5
5	Gustaph	"Because of You"	121	157	278	1
6	Gala Dragot	"T'inquiète"	146	125	271	3
7	Loredana	"You Lift Me Up"	83	84	167	6

==== Ratings ====
Viewing figures by show
Show	Date	Viewers	Ref.
Songclub show 1	9 January 2023	775,323	
Songclub show 2	10 January 2023	790,522	
Songclub show 3	11 January 2023	631,988	
Songclub show 4	12 January 2023	715,039	
Songclub show 5	13 January 2023	606,507	
Final	14 January 2023	892,781	

=== Promotion ===
Gustaph made several appearances across Europe to specifically promote "Because of You" as the Belgian Eurovision entry. On 8 April, Gustaph performed during the PrePartyES event, which was held at the Sala La Riviera venue in Madrid, Spain and hosted by Victor Escudero, SuRie and Ruslana. On 15 April, Gustaph performed during the Eurovision in Concert event which was held at the AFAS Live venue in Amsterdam, Netherlands and hosted by Cornald Maas and Hila Noorzai.

== At Eurovision ==
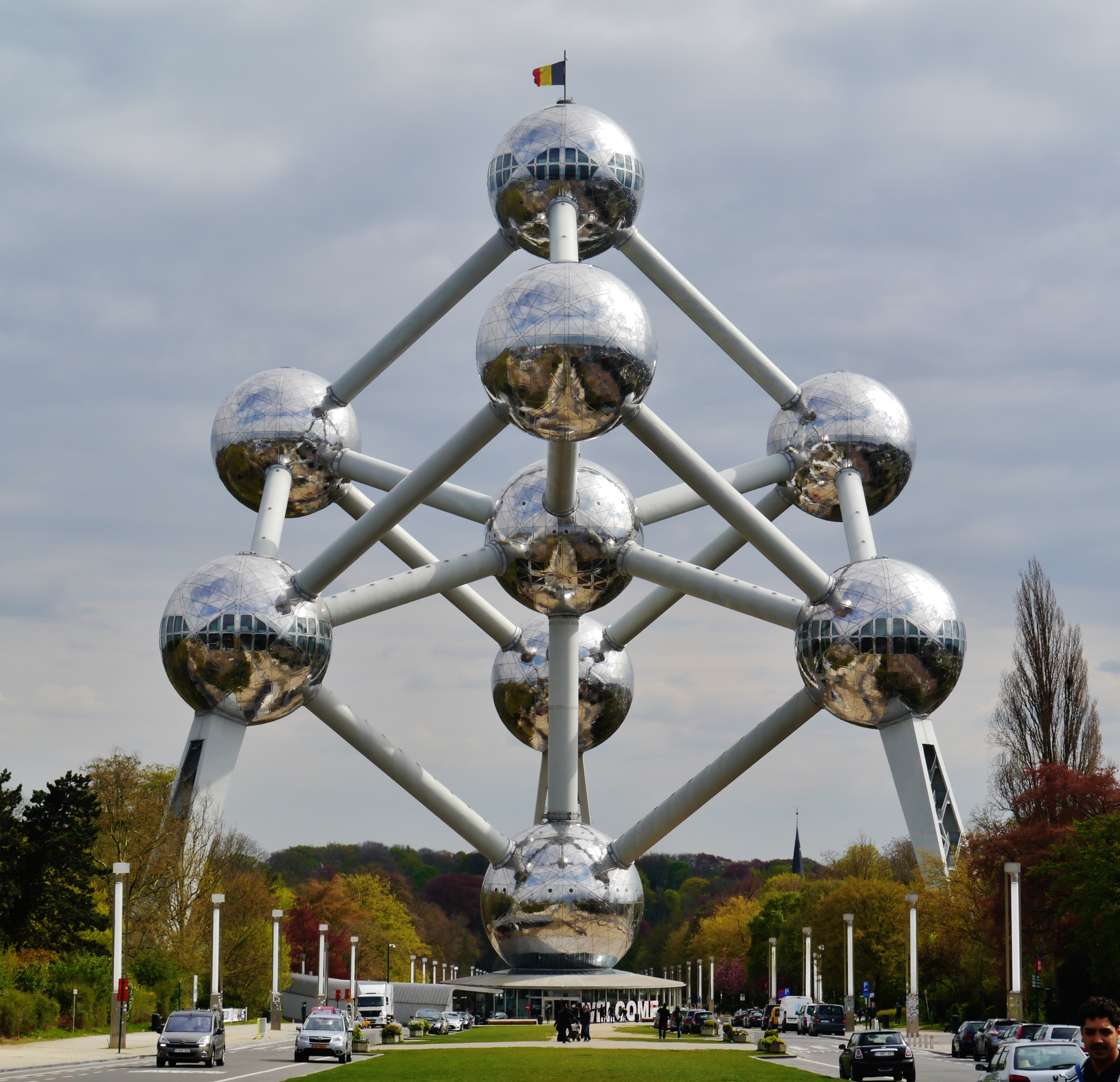
A video postcard introduced Gustaph's performance in the second semi-final of the Eurovision Song Contest 2023. The postcard was filmed at the Atomium in Brussels in March 2023 in collaboration with the host broadcaster BBC. The Angel of the North sculpture in Gateshead and the Independence Monument in Kyiv were also featured in the Belgian postcard.

According to Eurovision rules, all nations with the exceptions of the host country and the "Big Five" (France, Germany, Italy, Spain and the United Kingdom) are required to qualify from one of two semi-finals in order to compete for the final; the top ten countries from each semi-final progress to the final. The European Broadcasting Union (EBU) split up the competing countries into six different pots based on voting patterns from previous contests, with countries with favourable voting histories put into the same pot. On 31 January 2023, an allocation draw was held, which placed each country into one of the two semi-finals, and determined which half of the show they would perform in. Belgium has been placed into the second semi-final, to be held on 11 May 2023, and has been scheduled to perform in the first half of the show.

Once all the competing songs for the 2023 contest had been released, the running order for the semi-finals was decided by the shows' producers rather than through another draw, so that similar songs were not placed next to each other. Belgium was set to perform in position 5, following the entry from Estonia and before the entry from Cyprus.

The two semi-finals and the final was broadcast in Belgium by both the Flemish and Walloon broadcasters. VRT broadcast the shows on VRT 1 and Radio 2 with commentary in Dutch by Peter Van de Veire. The first semi-final reached over 549,000 viewers, while the second semi-final reached over 1.044 million viewers and the final reached over 1.334 million viewers with a marker share of 69.7%. RTBF televised the shows with commentary in French by Jean-Louis Lahaye and Maureen Louys; the first semi-final was broadcast on Tipil which reached 90,000 viewers, while the second semi-final and the final were broadcast on La Une with the former reaching 252,000 viewers and the latter reaching 344,000 viewers with a marker share of 31.4%. Vivacité also provided radio broadcasts for all three shows.

=== Semi-final ===
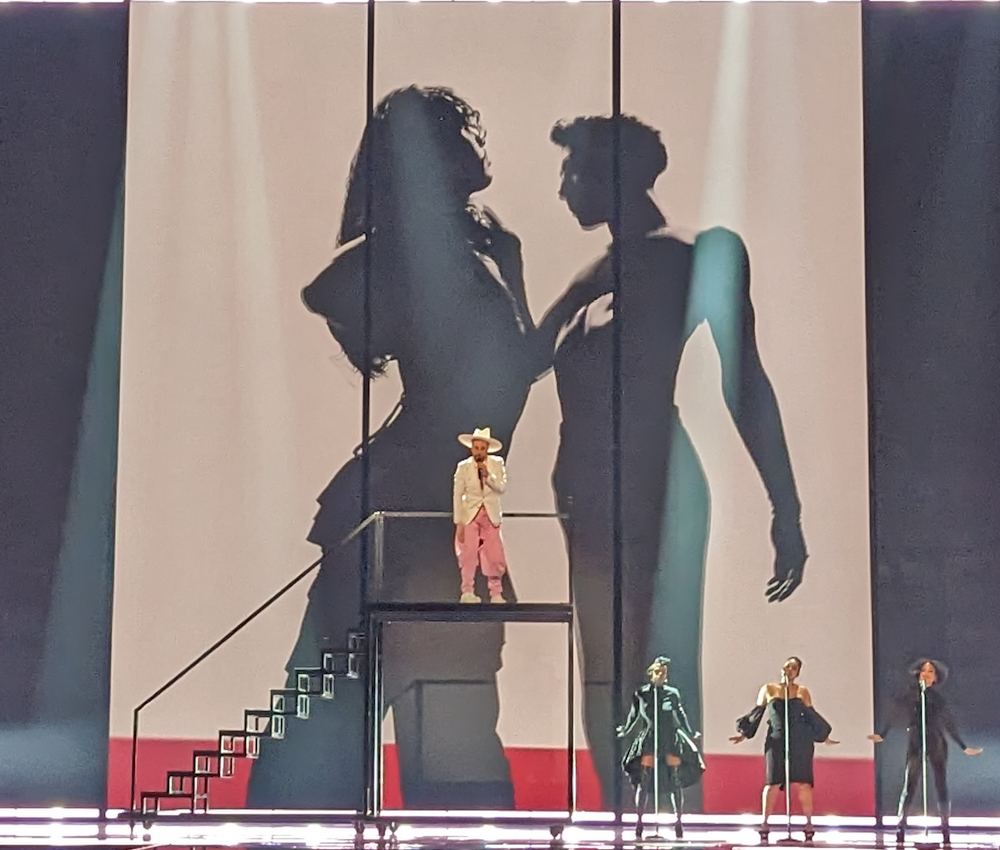
Gustaph during a rehearsal before the second semi-final

Gustaph took part in technical rehearsals on 1 and 4 May, followed by dress rehearsals on 10 and 11 May. This included the jury show on 10 May where the professional back-up juries of each country watched and voted in a result used if any issues with public televoting occurred.

The Belgian performance featured Gustaph in a pink and white outfit and performing on stage together with three backing vocalists and a dancer. The performance began with Gustaph on top of a stairway, after which he walked down the steps to join the backing vocalists which then walked from him to go on the stairs. At the second chorus, Gustaph and the backing vocalists appeared on the satellite stage and were joined by the dancer towards the end who vogued around the other performers. The stage colours were black, white and pink and the LED screens displayed dancing shadows. The Belgian performance was directed by Hans Pannecoucke. The three backing vocalists that joined Gustaph during the performance were: Chantal Kashala, Monique Harcum and Sandrine Van Handenhoven, while the dancer was PussCee West.

At the end of the show, Belgium was announced as having finished in the top 10 and subsequently qualifying for the grand final. It was later revealed that Belgium placed eighth in the semi-final, receiving a total of 90 points.

=== Final ===
Shortly after the first semi-final, a winners' press conference was held for the ten qualifying countries. As part of this press conference, the qualifying artists took part in a draw to determine which half of the grand final they would subsequently participate in. This draw was done in the order the countries appeared in the semi-final running order. Belgium was drawn to compete in the second half. Following this draw, the shows' producers decided upon the running order of the final, as they had done for the semi-finals. Belgium was subsequently placed to perform in position 16, before the entry from Australia and before the entry from Armenia.

Belgium once again took part in dress rehearsals on 12 and 13 May before the final, including the jury final where the professional juries cast their final votes before the live show. Gustaph performed a repeat of his semi-final performance during the final on 14 May. Belgium placed seventh in the final, scoring 182 points: 55 points from the televoting and 127 points from the juries.

=== Voting ===
Voting during the three shows involved each country awarding sets of points from 1-8, 10 and 12: one from their professional jury and the other from televoting in the final vote, while the semi-final vote was based entirely on the vote of the public. Each nation's jury consisted of five music industry professionals who are citizens of the country they represent. This jury judged each entry based on: vocal capacity; the stage performance; the song's composition and originality; and the overall impression by the act. In addition, each member of a national jury may only take part in the panel once every three years, and no jury was permitted to discuss of their vote with other members or be related in any way to any of the competing acts in such a way that they cannot vote impartially and independently. The individual rankings of each jury member in an anonymised form as well as the nation's televoting results were released shortly after the grand final. VRT appointed Bart Cannaerts as its spokesperson to announce the Belgian jury's votes in the final.

Below is a breakdown of points awarded to Belgium and awarded by Belgium in the second semi-final and grand final of the contest, and the breakdown of the jury voting and televoting conducted during the two shows:

==== Points awarded to Belgium ====
Points awarded to Belgium (Semi-final 2)
Score	Televote
12 points	Austria
10 points	
8 points	Denmark; Spain
7 points	Australia; Iceland; Slovenia
6 points	United Kingdom
5 points	Lithuania; Rest of the World; San Marino
4 points	Cyprus; Estonia
3 points	Albania; Georgia; Poland
2 points	
1 point	Armenia; Greece; Ukraine

Points awarded to Belgium (Final)
Score	Televote	Jury
12 points		Australia; Georgia; Greece
10 points	Netherlands	Ireland
8 points		
7 points	Sweden	Lithuania; San Marino; United Kingdom
6 points	Denmark; Iceland; United Kingdom	Estonia; Portugal
5 points		Albania; Finland; Iceland; Poland; Slovenia
4 points	Norway	Netherlands; Spain
3 points	Australia; Ireland; Spain	Austria; Denmark; Israel
2 points	France; Germany; Slovenia	Italy; Latvia; Romania
1 point	Portugal	

==== Points awarded by Belgium ====
Points awarded by Belgium (Semi-final 2)
Score	Televote
12 points	Armenia
10 points	Austria
8 points	Albania
7 points	Poland
6 points	Australia
5 points	Lithuania
4 points	Cyprus
3 points	Slovenia
2 points	Estonia
1 point	Iceland

Points awarded by Belgium (Final)
Score	Televote	Jury
12 points	Finland	Austria
10 points	Sweden	Israel
8 points	Norway	Sweden
7 points	Italy	Italy
6 points	Armenia	Spain
5 points	Israel	Finland
4 points	Poland	Australia
3 points	Albania	Czech Republic
2 points	France	Poland
1 point	Ukraine	France

==== Detailed voting results ====
The following members comprised the Belgian jury:

- Alex Callier
- Lester William Senior
- Sam Jaspers
- Laura Govaerts
- Sennek

Detailed voting results from Belgium (Semi-final 2)
R/O	Country	Televote	
R/O	Country	Rank	Points
01	Denmark	13	
02	Armenia	1	12
03	Romania	14	
04	Estonia	9	2
05	Belgium		
06	Cyprus	7	4
07	Iceland	10	1
08	Greece	12	
09	Poland	4	7
10	Slovenia	8	3
11	Georgia	11	
12	San Marino	15	
13	Austria	2	10
14	Albania	3	8
15	Lithuania	6	5
16	Australia	5	6

Detailed voting results from Belgium (Final)
R/O	Country	Jury							Televote	
R/O	Country	Juror 1	Juror 2	Juror 3	Juror 4	Juror 5	Rank	Points	Rank	Points
01	Austria	1	2	7	11	5	1	12	12	
02	Portugal	13	14	17	18	6	14		15	
03	Switzerland	17	8	18	7	23	13		14	
04	Poland	10	10	1	14	21	9	2	7	4
05	Serbia	23	22	19	19	12	22		24	
06	France	12	5	8	24	4	10	1	9	2
07	Cyprus	21	12	21	23	11	19		13	
08	Spain	4	13	2	4	10	5	6	22	
09	Sweden	15	1	4	12	2	3	8	2	10
10	Albania	20	15	9	15	16	18		8	3
11	Italy	7	6	10	3	1	4	7	4	7
12	Estonia	6	9	11	10	20	12		17	
13	Finland	14	24	6	2	3	6	5	1	12
14	Czech Republic	3	4	14	9	7	8	3	18	
15	Australia	2	19	5	6	9	7	4	19	
16	Belgium									
17	Armenia	19	7	13	13	24	15		5	6
18	Moldova	11	21	22	21	19	21		11	
19	Ukraine	18	25	24	25	13	23		10	1
20	Norway	25	16	12	8	17	17		3	8
21	Germany	22	18	20	20	22	24		23	
22	Lithuania	9	11	15	22	14	16		20	
23	Israel	8	3	3	1	18	2	10	6	5
24	Slovenia	5	20	25	5	8	11		21	
25	Croatia	24	23	23	17	25	25		16	
26	United Kingdom	16	17	16	16	15	20		25	
