= Alvan (singer) =

French singer and songwriter (born 1993)

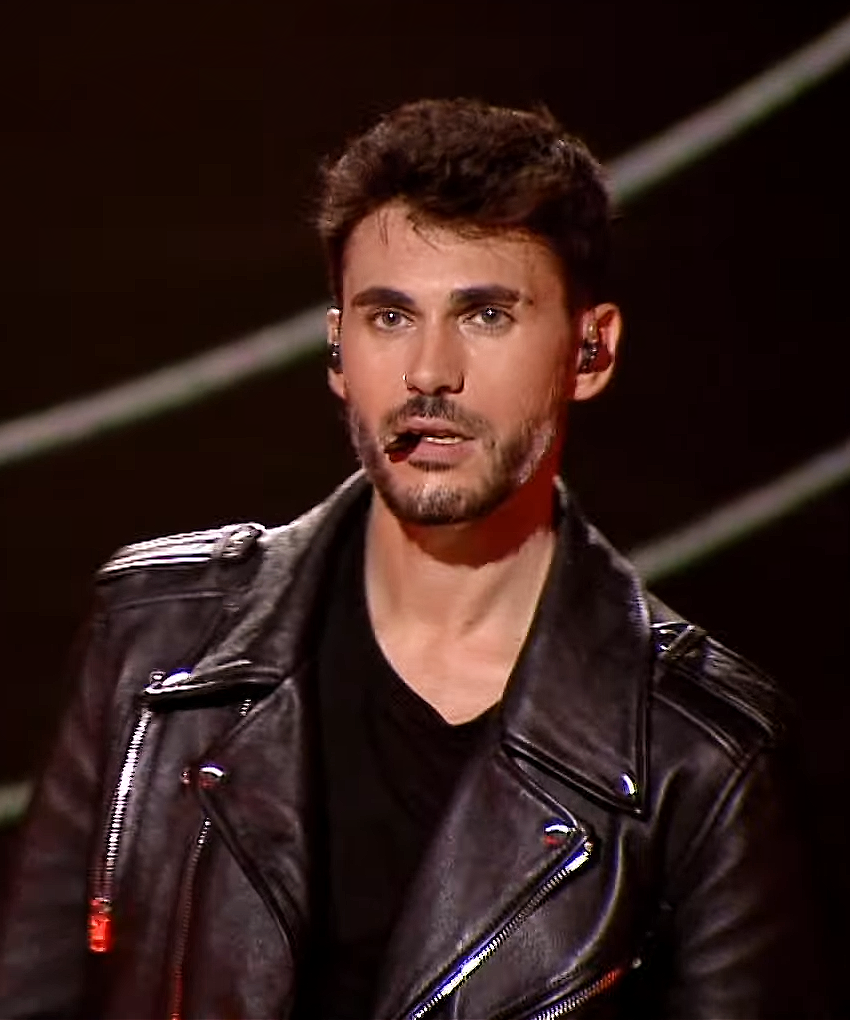
- Alvan in 2022

Background information
- Born: Alexis Morvan Rosius; 17 March 1993 (age 32); Lorient, France
- Origin: Rennes, France
- Genres: Electro
- Years active: 2015–present

Alexis Morvan Rosius (born 17 March 1993), known professionally as Alvan, is a French singer and songwriter. He represented France in the Eurovision Song Contest 2022 together with vocal group Ahez with the song "Fulenn".

== Discography ==
=== Studio albums ===
List of studio albums, with selected details
| Title | Details | Peak chart positions |
| Title | Details | FRA Phys. |
|---|---|---|
| Magma | Released: 13 May 2022; Label: Parlophone, Warner; Formats: CD, digital download, streaming | 71 |

=== Extended plays ===
List of EPs, with selected details
| Title | Details |
|---|---|
| Home | Released: 1 July 2016; Label: Inside Records; Formats: 12-inch, digital download, streaming |
| La ballade | Released: 8 September 2017; Label: Inside Records; Formats: 12-inch, digital download, streaming |

=== Singles ===
| Title | Year | Peak chart positions | | Album |
| Title | Year | LTU | SWE Heat. | Album |
|---|---|---|---|---|
| "Dame de cœur" | 2016 | — | — | Non-album singles |
| "Kangei" | 2016 | — | — | Non-album singles |
| "Pure" | 2016 | — | — | Non-album singles |
| "Bodhyanga" | 2016 | — | — | Home |
| "Home" | 2016 | — | — | Home |
| "Chinatown" | 2016 | — | — | Home |
| "Sanzel" | 2016 | — | — | Non-album single |
| "Amazone" | 2017 | — | — | Home |
| "Damiana" (featuring Velvet) | 2018 | — | — | Non-album singles |
| "Indolove" (featuring Keybeaux) | 2019 | — | — | Non-album singles |
| "Move On" | 2019 | — | — | Non-album singles |
| "Anything" | 2021 | — | — | Magma |
| "Fulenn" (with Ahez) | 2022 | 22 | 18 | Magma |
| "DCAI (Radio Edit)" | 2022 | — | — | Magma |
| "Calzone" | 2022 | — | — | Non-album singles |
| "Loup" | 2025 | — | — | Non-album singles |
| "Petit garçon" | 2025 | — | — | Non-album singles |
| "Intra" | 2026 | — | — | Non-album singles |
| "Truefrench" | 2026 | — | — | Non-album singles |
"—" denotes a recording that did not chart or was not released in that territory.

Awards and achievements
| Preceded by Barbara Pravi with "Voilà" | France in the Eurovision Song Contest (with Ahez); 2022 | Succeeded by La Zarra with "Évidemment" |
