= Fuck You (La Zarra song) =

Single by La Zarra

from the album Der Himmel
- Language: French
- Released: 5 December 2025
- Genre: Pop
- Label: Kiki Productions
- Songwriters: Fatima-Zahra Hafdi; Ahmed Saghir; Clément Langlois-Légaré; Pierre-Philippe Côté

La Zarra singles chronology
"Diva" (2025)	"Fuck You" (2025)	"Johny" (2026)

Music video
- "Fuck You" on YouTube

"Fuck You" is a song by Canadian singer-songwriter La Zarra. It was released as a single on December 5, 2025, and is featured on her 2026 album Der Himmel. The track marks her second musical release (after the single "Diva") since representing France in the Eurovision Song Contest 2023 with "Évidemment".

Co-written by La Zarra alongside Ahmed Saghir, Clément Langlois-Légaré, and Pierre-Philippe Côté, the French-language pop song explores themes of self-assertion, refusing to stay silent, and breaking free from a toxic relationship where the narrator is constantly criticized. Upon its release, the song's title and timing garnered attention on social media; because it coincided with a controversial European Broadcasting Union announcement regarding the upcoming Eurovision Song Contest, many fans and commentators interpreted the release as a defiant statement reflecting the singer's outspoken political activism.

== Background ==
In May 2023, La Zarra represented France at the Eurovision Song Contest 2023 in Liverpool, United Kingdom, with the song "Évidemment". Despite being favored by bookmakers, she finished in 16th place. During the grand final's live broadcast, upon receiving her public televote score, La Zarra was captured on camera performing a hand gesture that was widely interpreted by the public and media as a middle finger. The singer firmly denied this interpretation, explaining during a post-contest press conference that the gesture was a "toz"—a cultural expression of disappointment—and not an insult. Nevertheless, the incident sparked a major media controversy in France and across Europe.

The backlash heavily impacted La Zarra's career; she faced intense public criticism, accusations of "diva" behavior, and a string of canceled concerts due to poor ticket sales. In response to the negative press and feeling unfairly treated by the industry, she decided to step away from the public eye, taking a two-year hiatus from releasing music. During her musical absence, La Zarra became more politically outspoken. In early 2025, she was one of over 70 former Eurovision participants who signed an open letter addressed to the European Broadcasting Union (EBU), demanding that Israel be banned from the contest.

La Zarra officially announced her musical comeback in June 2025 with the release of the single "Diva", an upbeat disco-pop track in which she ironically reclaimed the negative labels and criticisms she had received during the Eurovision fallout. "Fuck You" was released on 5 December 2025 as the lead single from her second studio album Der Himmel.

== Composition ==
"Fuck You" is a French-language pop song with a running time of three minutes and thirty-two seconds. The track was co-written by La Zarra, alongside Ahmed Saghir, Clément Langlois-Légaré, and Pierre-Philippe Côté. It was independently produced as part of her second studio album, Der Himmel. Following a period of intense media scrutiny and her eventual departure from Universal Music Canada, La Zarra financed and produced the project herself using her own savings. This decision allowed her to reclaim complete creative control, entirely removing the industry pressure to replicate the radio-friendly electronic sound of her previous hits.

Musically the song represents a stylistic evolution for La Zarra. Moving away from her earlier disco and electro-pop signatures, the composition is characterized by a cinematic blend of modern pop, classic French chanson, Americana and jazz influences. This new musical direction was heavily shaped by her collaboration with producers Clément Langlois-Légaré and Patrick Krief. It is the first song in La Zarra's discography to feature an explicit title and such unfiltered language, a deliberate choice reflecting her desire to directly confront the expectations and toxicity she experienced in her early career.

== Music video ==
The official music video for "Fuck You" premiered on La Zarra's YouTube channel on 5 December 2025.
