= La Zarra =

Canadian singer

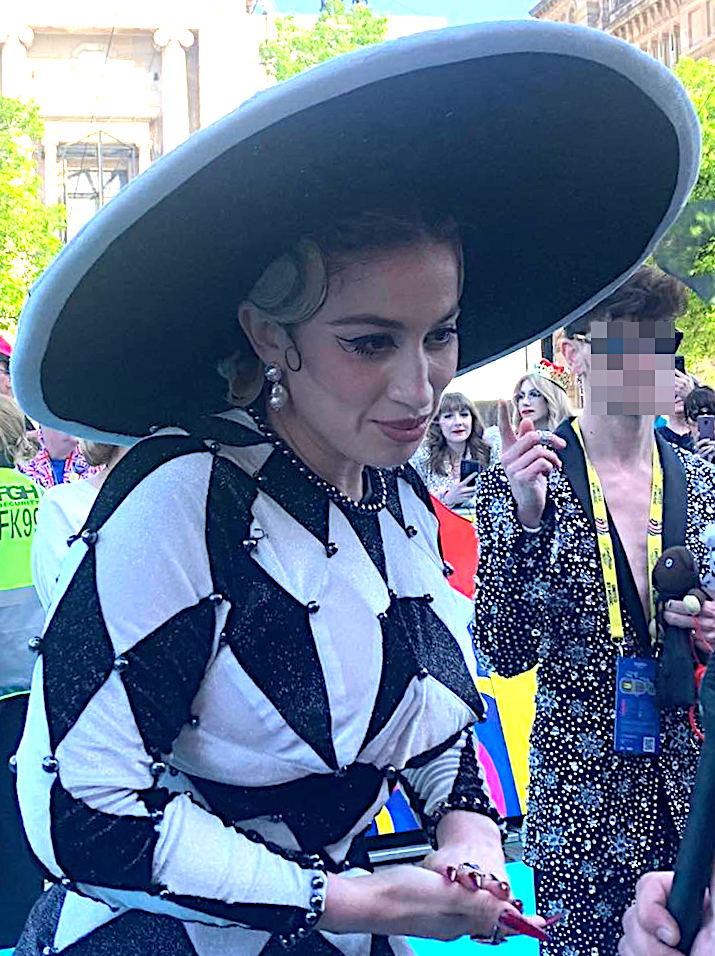
- La Zarra in 2023

Background information
- Born: Fatima-Zahra Hafdi; 25 August 1987 (age 39); Montreal, Quebec, Canada
- Genres: Chanson; urban
- Occupation: Singer • Songwriter • Producer
- Years active: 2016, 2020–present
- Labels: Polydor; Indifference Prod; Kiki Productions Inc
- Website: www.la-zarra.ca

Fatima-Zahra Hafdi (Arabic: فاطمة الزهراء حافظي; born 25 August 1987), known professionally as La Zarra (French pronunciation: [la zaʁa]), is a Canadian singer based in France. She represented France in the Eurovision Song Contest 2023 in Liverpool with the song "Évidemment", finishing in 16th place.

== Biography ==
Hafdi was born in Montreal, Canada, to parents from Morocco. During her childhood, she lived between Montreal and Longueuil, where her family finally settled. She rose to prominence in 2016, when she released her debut single "Printemps blanc", in collaboration with French rapper Niro.

In 2021, her fame increased with the single "Tu t'en iras", which was regularly broadcast on radio and television. The single was certified diamond by the Syndicat National de l'Édition Phonographique (SNEP). In the same year, La Zarra was nominated for the NRJ Music Awards, the leading French music awards, as Francophone revelation of the year, boosted in part by the success of her debut album Traîtrise.

On 12 January 2023, she was chosen by France Télévisions to represent France in the Eurovision Song Contest 2023, becoming the second Canadian singer to represent the country after Natasha St-Pier in 2001. She placed sixteenth out of twenty-six countries in the Grand Final, with 104 points.

In 2024, she performed Diane Tell's "Si j'étais un homme" at the ceremony inducting Tell into the Canadian Songwriters Hall of Fame.

In 2025, over 70 past Eurovision participants, including La Zarra, signed an open letter to the European Broadcasting Union (EBU) demanding that Israel be banned from the contest.

== Discography ==
=== Studio albums ===
List of studio albums with album details
Title	Details	Peak chart positions
Title	Details	FRA
Traîtrise	Released: 3 December 2021; Label: Polydor, Indifference Prod; Formats: Digital download, streaming	82
Der Himmel	Released: 27 March 2026; Label: Kiki Productions; Formats: Digital download, streaming	—
"—" denotes a recording that did not chart or was not released in that territory.

=== Singles ===
==== As lead artist ====
List of singles as lead artist, with selected chart positions, showing year released and album name
Title	Year	Peak chart positions						Certifications	Album or EP
Title	Year	FRA	FIN	IRE	LTU	SWE	UK	Certifications	Album or EP
"À l'ammoniaque/Mon dieu"	2020	—	—	—	—	—	—		Non-album singles
"Printemps blanc"	2021	—	—	—	—	—	—		Non-album singles
"Tirer un trait"	2021	—	—	—	—	—	—		Non-album singles
"Tu t'en iras"	2021	75	—	—	—	—	—	SNEP: Diamond	Traîtrise
"TFTF"	2021	—	—	—	—	—	—		Traîtrise
"Santa Baby"	2021	—	—	—	—	—	—		Non-album singles
"Sans moi"	2022	—	—	—	—	—	—		Non-album singles
"Évidemment"	2023	82	23	95	7	84	94		Non-album singles
"Diva"	2025	—	—	—	—	—	—		Non-album singles
"Fuck You"	2025	—	—	—	—	—	—		Der Himmel
"Johny"	2026	—	—	—	—	—	—		Der Himmel
"Quand je t'aime"	2026	—	—	—	—	—	—		Non-album single
"—" denotes a recording that did not chart or was not released in that territory.

==== As featured artist ====
List of singles as featured artist, with album name
Title	Year	Peak chart positions		Certifications	Album
Title	Year	FRA	BEL (Wa) Tip	Certifications	Album
"Printemps blanc" (Niro featuring La Zarra)	2016	109	30	SNEP: Diamond	Les autres
"Les amants de la colline" (Slimane featuring La Zarra)	2022	—	—		Chroniques d'un Cupidon
"—" denotes a recording that did not chart or was not released in that territory.

== Awards and nominations ==
Year	Award	Category	Work	Result	Ref.
2021	23rd NRJ Music Awards	Francophone Female Artist of the Year	Herself	Nominated	
2022	44th Félix Awards	Revelation of the Year	Herself	Nominated	
2022	33rd SOCAN Awards	Revelation of the Year	Herself	Won	
2023	34th SOCAN Awards	International Song Award	Herself	Won	
2023	3rd Eurovision Awards	Style Icon	Herself	Won	

Awards and achievements
Preceded by Alvan & Ahez with "Fulenn"	France in the Eurovision Song Contest; 2023	Succeeded by Slimane with "Mon amour"
