= Ahez =

French vocal group

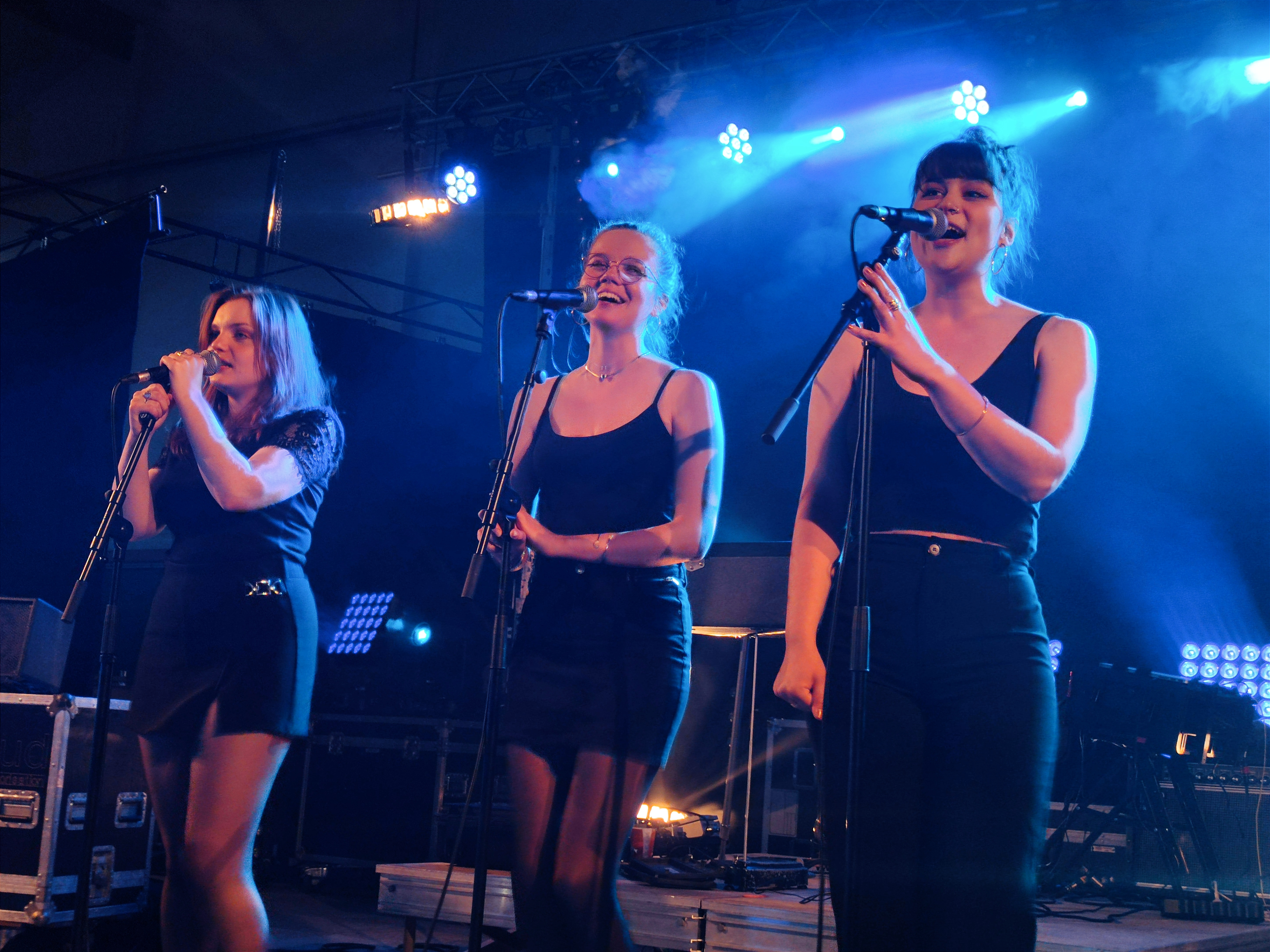
- The three singers with the band Eben.

Background information
- Origin: Carhaix, Brittany, France
- Genres: Kan ha diskan; Celtic fusion
- Years active: 2018–present
- Members: Marine Lavigne; Sterenn Diridollou; Sterenn Le Guillou

Ahez is a French vocal group from Carhaix, Brittany, consisting of Marine Lavigne, Sterenn Diridollou and Sterenn Le Guillou. The trio represented France in the Eurovision Song Contest 2022 together with Alvan with the song "Fulenn".

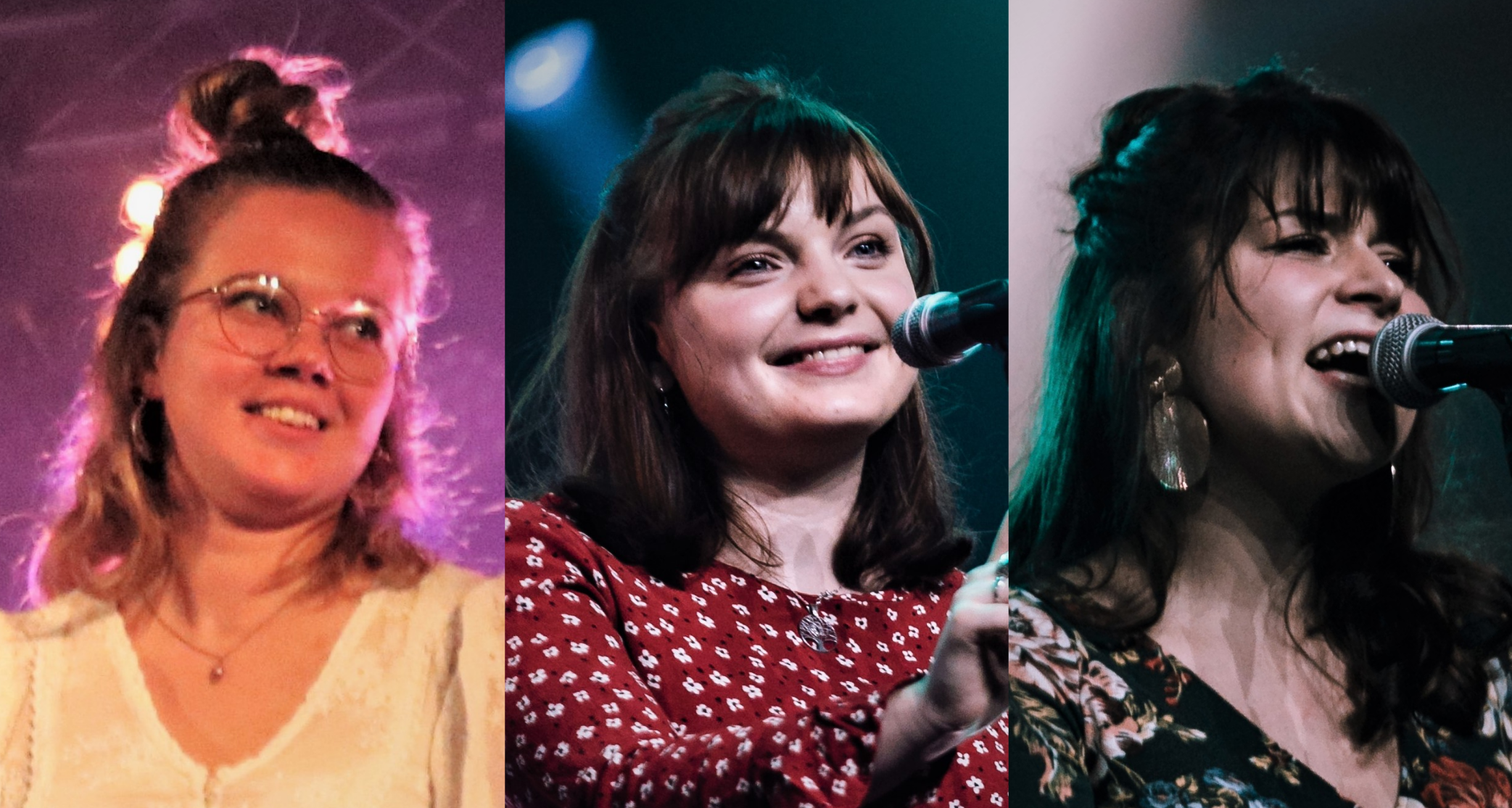
Left to right: Diridollou, Lavigne and Le Guillou

== History ==
Diridollou, Lavigne and Le Guillou met during their studies at Diwan secondary school in Carhaix, Brittany, where they practised the traditional singing style kan ha diskan. The name "Ahez" comes from Ker Ahez, a popular etymology for the Breton name of Carhaix (Karaez), and Ahes, a Breton mythological figure. The group started performing at fest-noz festivals in 2018, and took part in the 2018 edition of the Inter-Celtic Festival of Lorient with the band Eben.

In the summer of 2021, they met singer and producer Alvan in a bar in Rennes. Together, they participated in Eurovision France, c'est vous qui décidez ! 2022 ("Eurovision France, you decide ! 2022"), the French national selection for the Eurovision Song Contest 2022, with the song "Fulenn". They went on to win the competition, winning both the jury vote and televote. "Fulenn" was the first Eurovision entry to be sung in Breton since 1996. They placed 24th in the Eurovision final, scoring a total of 17 points.

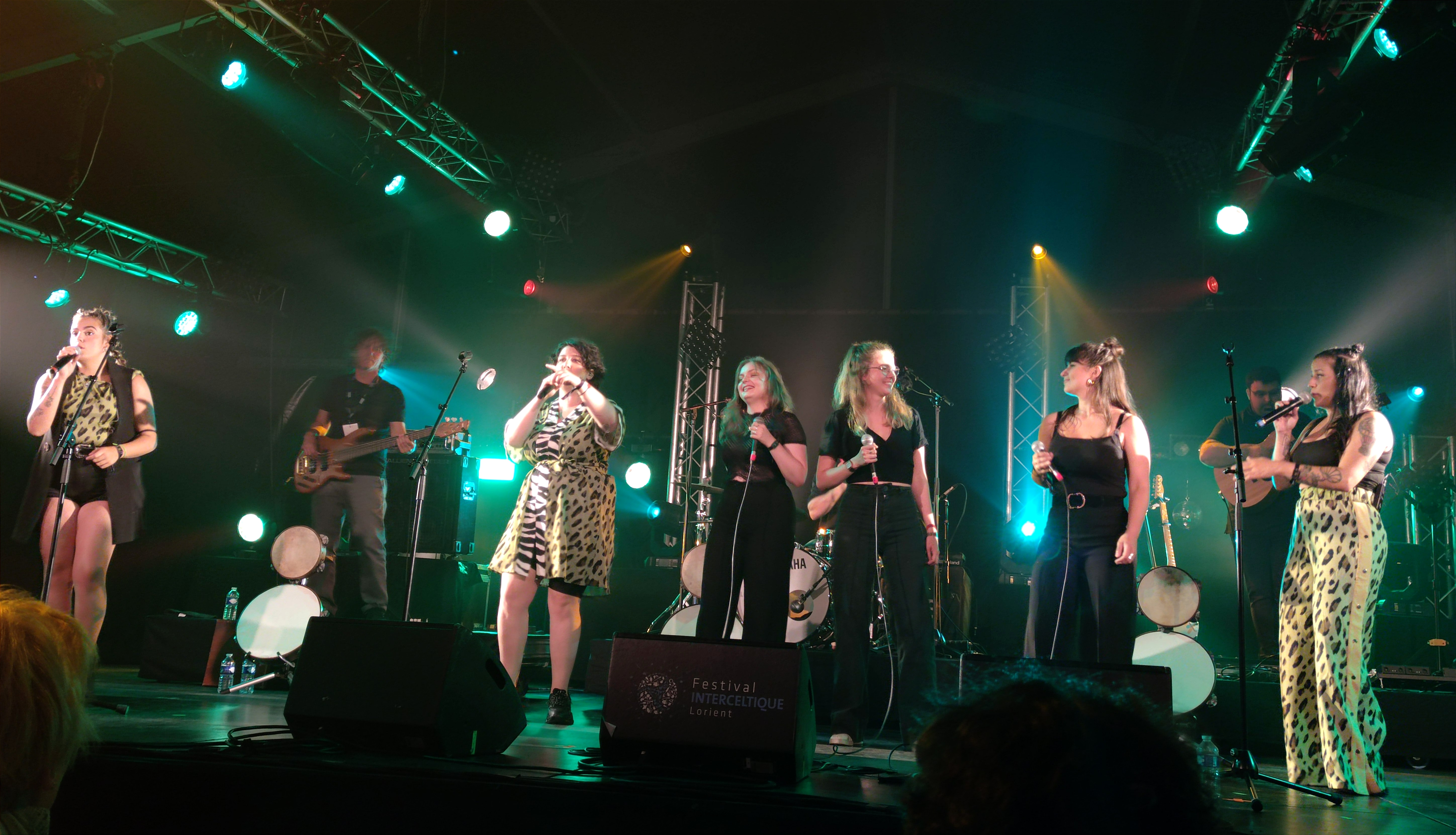
Algaire and Ahez at the Festival Interceltique de Lorient.

At the end of 2022, the group collaborated with the traditional Asturian group Algaire on the song in Asturian "Llume", and wrote a verse in the Breton language. A clip was released in January 2023. In August the two groups sing together at the Festival Interceltique de Lorient 2023.

== Discography ==
=== Singles ===
Title	Year	Peak chart positions		Album
Title	Year	LIT	SWE Heat.	Album
"Fulenn" (with Alvan)	2022	22	18	Magma
"Llume" (with Algaire)	2023			

Awards and achievements
Preceded by Barbara Pravi with "Voilà"	France in the Eurovision Song Contest (with Alvan); 2022	Succeeded by La Zarra with "Évidemment"
