= France in the Eurovision Song Contest 2022 =

- Eurovision Song Contest 2022
- Participating broadcaster: France Télévisions
- Country: France
- Selection process: Eurovision France, c'est vous qui décidez !
- Selection date: 5 March 2022

Competing entry
- Song: "Fulenn"
- Artist: Alvan and Ahez
- Songwriters: Marine Lavigne; Alvan Morvan Rosius

Placement
- Final result: 24th, 17 points

Participation chronology

France was represented at the Eurovision Song Contest 2022 with the song "Fulenn" performed by Alvan and Ahez. The French broadcaster France Télévisions organised the national final Eurovision France, c'est vous qui décidez ! in order to select the French entry for the 2022 contest. Twelve songs competed in the national final on 5 March 2022, where the winner was selected over two rounds of voting.

== Background ==
Prior to the 2022 contest, France has participated in the Eurovision Song Contest sixty-three times since its debut as one of seven countries to take part in the inaugural contest. France first won the contest in 1958 with "Dors, mon amour" performed by André Claveau. In the 1960s, they won three times, with "Tom Pillibi" performed by Jacqueline Boyer in 1960, "Un premier amour" performed by Isabelle Aubret in 1962 and "Un jour, un enfant" performed by Frida Boccara, who won in 1969 in a four-way tie with the Netherlands, Spain and the United Kingdom. France's fifth victory came in 1977, when Marie Myriam won with the song "L'oiseau et l'enfant". France has also finished second five times, with Paule Desjardins in 1957, Catherine Ferry in 1976, Joëlle Ursull in 1990, Amina in 1991 (who lost out to Sweden's Carola in a tie-break), and Barbara Pravi in 2021. In the 21st century, France has had less success, only making the top ten five times, with Natasha St-Pier finishing fourth in 2001, Sandrine François finishing fifth in 2002, Patricia Kaas finishing eighth in 2009, Amir finishing sixth in 2016, and Pravi finishing second in 2021 with 499 points.

The French national broadcaster, France Télévisions, broadcasts the event within the country and delegates the selection of the nation's entry to the television channel France 2. The French broadcaster has used both national finals and internal selection to choose the national entry in the past. The 2018 and 2019 French entries were selected via the national final Destination Eurovision, while in 2021, the new format Eurovision France, c'est vous qui décidez ! was used as the national selection.

== Before Eurovision ==
=== Eurovision France, c'est vous qui décidez ! ===
Eurovision France, c'est vous qui décidez ! ("Eurovision France, it's you who decide!") was the national final organised by France 2 to select France's entry for the Eurovision Song Contest 2022. The competition took place on 5 March 2022 at the France Télévisions studios in Saint-Denis, hosted by Stéphane Bern and Laurence Boccolini. The show was broadcast on France 2, TV5Monde and TV5 Québec Canada on a time delay as well as online via France Télévisions and TV5Monde's official websites france.tv and europe.tv5monde.com, respectively. The national final was watched by 1.47 million viewers in France with a market share of 8.8%.

==== Format ====
The format of the national final consists of a live final on 5 March 2022 where the winner was selected over two rounds of voting. Twelve entries competed in the first round, from which five was selected exclusively by public televoting to advance to the second round, the superfinal. A ten-member Francophone and international jury panel then selected a wildcard entry from the remaining seven entries to proceed to the superfinal. In the superfinal, the winner was determined by the combination of public televoting (50%) and the ten-member jury panel (50%). The public and the juries each had a total of 420 points to award, with each jury member awarding 2, 4, 6, 8, 10 and 12 points to their top six entries. Viewers were able to vote via telephone and SMS voting which also accepted international votes, with the public vote awarding 20, 40, 60, 80, 100 and 120 points to their top six songs. The jury panel consisted of:

- Jenifer (jury president) – singer and actress
- Gjon's Tears – singer-songwriter, represented Switzerland in 2021
- Nicoletta – singer
- Cyril Féraud – television presenter
- Yseult – singer-songwriter and model
- Agustín Galiana – Spanish singer and comedian
- Élodie Gossuin – television presenter, co-host of the Junior Eurovision Song Contest 2021
- André Manoukian – jazz singer and former judge on Nouvelle Star
- Joyce Jonathan – singer-songwriter
- Sundy Jules – YouTube personality

==== Competing entries ====
France 2 opened a submission period on 21 June 2021 in order for interested artists and songwriters to submit their proposals through an online submission form up until the deadline on 24 October 2021. Songs were required to contain at least 70% French language or French regional language lyrics with a free language allowance for the remaining lyrics. At the closing of the deadline, the French broadcaster received 3,000 submissions. Auditions which featured entries shortlisted from the received submissions took place starting on 6 January 2022 at the Apollo Theatre in Paris, and the twelve entries selected to compete in the national final were announced on 16 February 2022.

==== Final ====
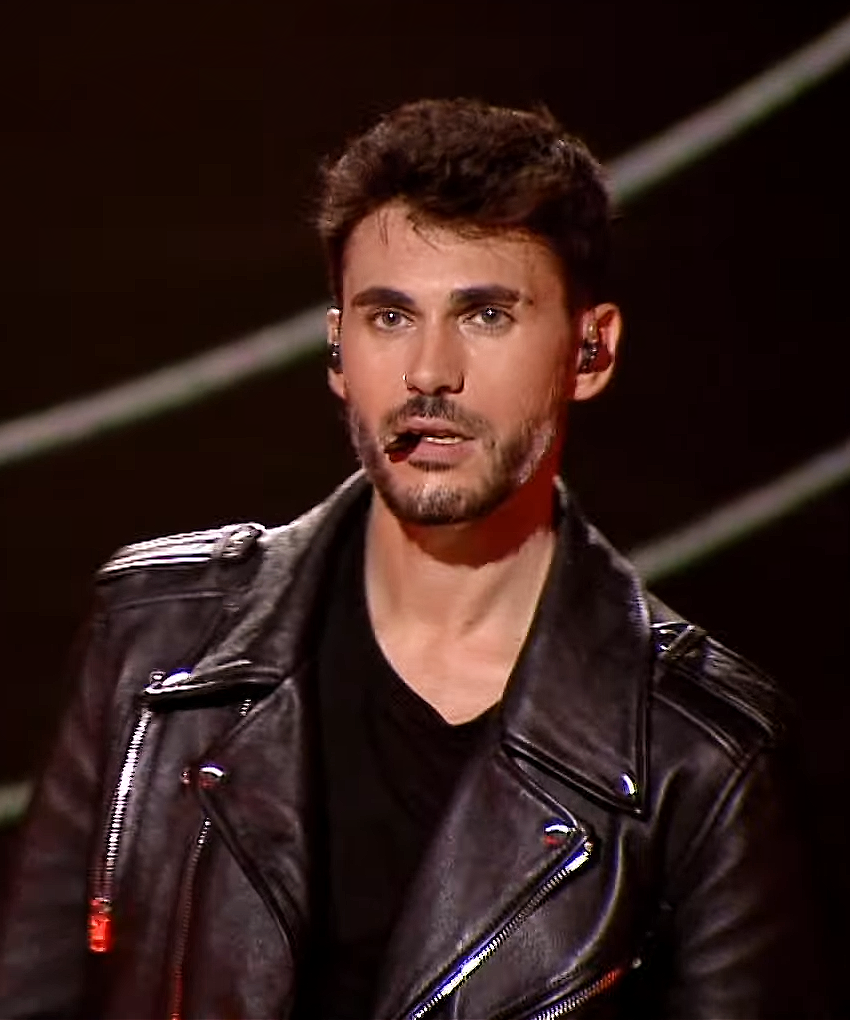
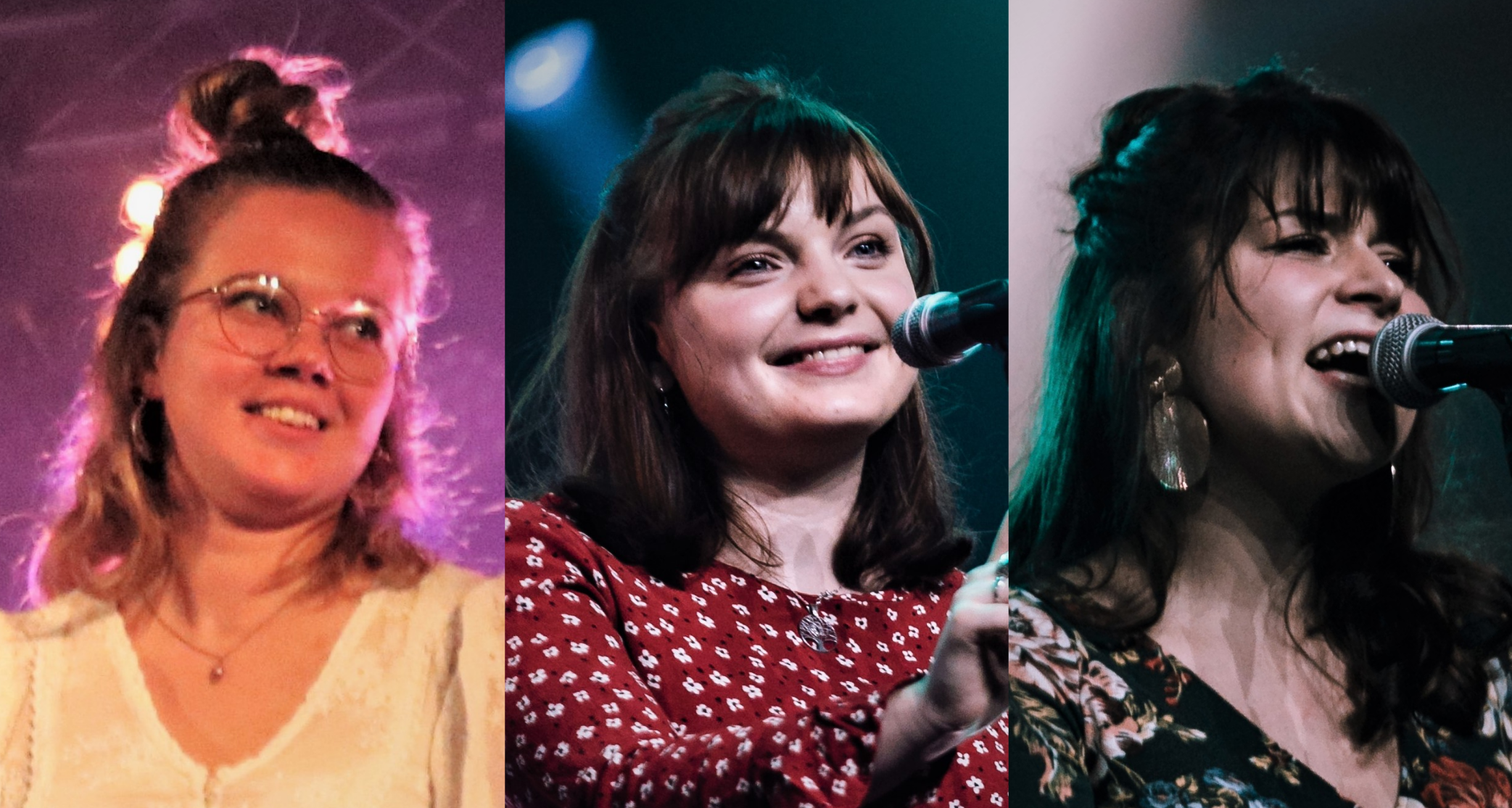
Alvan (left) and Sterenn Diridollou, Marine Lavigne and Sterenn Le Guillou of Ahez

The final took place on 5 March 2022. Twelve entries competed and the winner was selected over two rounds of voting. In the first round, the top five entries as determined exclusively by public televoting advanced to the second round, the superfinal. "Ma famille" performed by Cyprien Zeni was awarded the wildcard by a Francophone and international ten-member jury panel from the remaining seven entries to proceed to the superfinal. Immediately after the artists concluded their performances, a number was shown which denoted the amount of jury members who liked the song, however the results were symbolic and did not affect the voting. In the superfinal, the winner, "Fulenn" performed by Alvan and Ahez, was determined by the combination of public televoting and the ten-member jury. In addition to performing their contest entry, the twelve artists performed the song "Imagine" by John Lennon in support of the Ukrainian people affected by the Russian invasion of the country, preceded by a message from Ukrainian Eurovision Song Contest 2016 winner Jamala. Barbara Pravi, who represented France in the 2021 Contest, performed her song "Voilà" as the interval act of the show.

Final – 5 March 2022
R/O	Artist	Song	Songwriter(s)	Likes	Result
1	Soa	"Seule"	LudySoa; NathanSoa	8	Advanced
2	Joan	"Madame"	Joan; Alex Finkin	7	—N/a
3	Saam	"Il est où ?"	Saam; Ness; Charles Boccara	6	—N/a
4	Elia	"Téléphone"	Elia; Anibeatz	8	—N/a
5	Marius	"Les chansons d'amour"	Marius Niollet; Igit; Jonathan Cagne	8	Advanced
6	Hélène in Paris	"Paris mon amour"	Hélène Benhamou; Virginie Lesdemia; David Lefèvre	6	—N/a
7	Joanna	"Navigateure"	Joanna Fouquet; Sutus; Gaspard Murphy	7	—N/a
8	Alvan and Ahez	"Fulenn"	Marine Lavigne; Alvan Morvan Rosius	9	Advanced
9	Julia	"Chut"	Julia Fiquet; Alban Lico; Fabien Mettay; Anton Wick	5	—N/a
10	Cyprien Zeni	"Ma famille"	Cyprien Zeni; Stéphane Petrequi; Nicolas Lassus	7	Wildcard
11	Pauline Chagne	"Nuit Pauline"	Pauline Chagne; Antonin Tardy	9	Advanced
12	Elliott	"La tempête"	Elliott Schmitt; François Welgryn; Aliose; Gaspard Murphy	6	Advanced

Superfinal – 5 March 2022
Artist	Song	Jury	Televote	Points	Place
Alvan and Ahez	"Fulenn"	102	120	222	1
Cyprien Zeni	"Ma famille"	74	20	94	5
Elliott	"La tempête"	32	60	92	6
Marius	"Les chansons d'amour"	80	40	120	4
Pauline Chagne	"Nuit Pauline"	72	100	172	2
Soa	"Seule"	60	80	140	3

Detailed jury votes
Song	Jenifer	G. Tears	Yseult	A. Manoukian	A. Galiana	J. Jonathan	C. Féraud	E. Gossuin	Nicoletta	S. Jules	Points
"Seule"	6	2	6	4	10	10	6	6	2	8	60
"Les chansons d'amour"	10	8	4	10	8	12	4	4	8	12	80
"Fulenn"	12	6	10	12	12	8	12	12	12	6	102
"Ma famille"	8	4	12	6	6	4	10	10	10	4	74
"Nuit Pauline"	2	12	8	8	4	6	8	8	6	10	72
"La tempête"	4	10	2	2	2	2	2	2	4	2	32

== At Eurovision ==
According to Eurovision rules, all nations with the exceptions of the host country and the "Big Five" (France, Germany, Italy, Spain and the United Kingdom) are required to qualify from one of two semi-finals in order to compete in the final; the top ten countries from each semi-final progress to the final. As a member of the "Big Five", France automatically qualified to compete in the final on 14 May 2022. France was set to perform in the first half of the final. In addition to its participation in the final, France was also required to broadcast and vote in one of the two semi-finals. This was decided via a draw held during the semi-final allocation draw on 25 January 2022, when it was announced that France would be voting in the first semi-final.

=== Voting ===
==== Points awarded to France ====
Points awarded to France (Final)
Score	Televote	Jury
12 points		
10 points		
8 points		
7 points		Armenia
6 points		
5 points		
4 points		
3 points		
2 points	Moldova; Serbia	
1 point	Croatia; Greece; Finland; Romania	Azerbaijan; Georgia

==== Points awarded by France ====
Points awarded by France (Semi-final 1)
Score	Televote	Jury
12 points	Armenia	Greece
10 points	Ukraine	Ukraine
8 points	Portugal	Netherlands
7 points	Moldova	Armenia
6 points	Lithuania	Portugal
5 points	Albania	Switzerland
4 points	Netherlands	Iceland
3 points	Iceland	Norway
2 points	Norway	Lithuania
1 point	Greece	Austria

Points awarded by France (Final)
Score	Televote	Jury
12 points	Ukraine	United Kingdom
10 points	Moldova	Ukraine
8 points	Serbia	Poland
7 points	Spain	Armenia
6 points	Portugal	Belgium
5 points	Armenia	Spain
4 points	Poland	Netherlands
3 points	Italy	Greece
2 points	United Kingdom	Czech Republic
1 point	Romania	Portugal

==== Detailed voting results ====
The following members comprised the French jury:

- Fabienne Moszer - Director of external relations of Accor Hotels Arena
- Jean-Philippe Lemonnier – Producer, Art director
- Maëva Raharisoa – Head of TV promotion at Mercury Records
- Mireille Dumas - Journalist, TV producer, presenter
- Moë Bennani - TV producer

Detailed voting results from France (Semi-final 1)
R/O	Country	Jury							Televote	
R/O	Country	Juror 1	Juror 2	Juror 3	Juror 4	Juror 5	Rank	Points	Rank	Points
01	Albania	12	17	17	17	17	17		6	5
02	Latvia	13	9	12	9	15	14		12	
03	Lithuania	16	8	6	12	6	9	2	5	6
04	Switzerland	5	3	11	5	3	6	5	17	
05	Slovenia	17	16	13	15	16	16		13	
06	Ukraine	9	2	1	2	10	2	10	2	10
07	Bulgaria	14	12	14	11	13	15		16	
08	Netherlands	2	11	3	8	2	3	8	7	4
09	Moldova	11	15	16	4	12	13		4	7
10	Portugal	8	4	10	1	5	5	6	3	8
11	Croatia	7	14	15	14	4	11		15	
12	Denmark	15	7	8	13	9	12		14	
13	Austria	10	13	4	10	11	10	1	11	
14	Iceland	6	6	2	7	14	7	4	8	3
15	Greece	3	1	7	6	1	1	12	10	1
16	Norway	4	10	5	16	8	8	3	9	2
17	Armenia	1	5	9	3	7	4	7	1	12

Detailed voting results from France (Final)
R/O	Country	Jury							Televote	
R/O	Country	Juror 1	Juror 2	Juror 3	Juror 4	Juror 5	Rank	Points	Rank	Points
01	Czech Republic	11	14	10	10	4	9	2	22	
02	Romania	22	17	24	20	22	23		10	1
03	Portugal	10	5	14	7	17	10	1	5	6
04	Finland	23	15	22	14	10	18		17	
05	Switzerland	17	12	16	12	14	16		24	
06	France									
07	Norway	8	18	17	13	9	14		15	
08	Armenia	4	7	6	3	7	4	7	6	5
09	Italy	20	10	19	17	18	19		8	3
10	Spain	3	4	11	15	15	6	5	4	7
11	Netherlands	6	19	9	4	8	7	4	14	
12	Ukraine	5	2	2	1	1	2	10	1	12
13	Germany	21	20	13	18	16	21		20	
14	Lithuania	19	16	15	16	13	20		12	
15	Azerbaijan	24	22	23	22	21	24		23	
16	Belgium	9	6	7	5	3	5	6	16	
17	Greece	7	21	5	6	12	8	3	21	
18	Iceland	18	8	21	9	5	12		19	
19	Moldova	12	23	20	21	23	22		2	10
20	Sweden	15	13	4	11	11	11		11	
21	Australia	16	11	8	23	19	15		18	
22	United Kingdom	2	3	1	2	2	1	12	9	2
23	Poland	1	1	12	8	6	3	8	7	4
24	Serbia	13	24	3	24	24	13		3	8
25	Estonia	14	9	18	19	20	17		13	
