= Finalement =

2024 French film by Claude Lalouch

- French theatrical release poster
- Directed by: Claude Lelouch
- Written by: Claude Lelouch; Pierre Leroux; Grégoire Lacroix; Valérie Perrin
- Starring: Kad Merad; Elsa Zylberstein; Michel Boujenah; Sandrine Bonnaire; Barbara Pravi; Françoise Gillard
- Cinematography: Maxine Heraud
- Edited by: Stéphane Mazalaigue
- Music by: Ibrahim Maalouf
- Production companies: Les Films 13; France 2 Cinéma; Laurent Dassault Rond-Point
- Distributed by: Metropolitan Filmexport
- Release dates: 2 September 2024 (Venice); 13 November 2024 (France)
- Running time: 129 minutes
- Country: France
- Language: French

Finalement (transl. Finally) is a 2024 French comedy drama film directed by Claude Lelouch. It premiered at the 81st Venice International Film Festival on 2 September 2024 and received a theatrical release in France on 13 November 2024.

== Premise ==
A lawyer, having lost his ability to tell lies, embarks on a road trip across France.

== Cast ==
- Kad Merad as Lino Massaro
- Elsa Zylberstein as Léa, Lino's wife
- Michel Boujenah as Michel
- Sandrine Bonnaire as Sandrine
- Barbara Pravi as Barbara, Lino's daughter
- Françoise Gillard as Manon
- Marianne Denicourt
- François Morel
- Raphaël Mezrahi
- Clémentine Célarié
- Lionel Abelanski
- Dominique Pinon
- Julie Ferrier
- Françoise Fabian as Françoise, Lino's mother
- Ibrahim Maalouf
- Victor Meutelet
- François Bureloup
- Gilles Lemaire
- Jean Dujardin
- Marie-Hélène Lentini as Madame Barbier
- Thomas Levet

== Production ==
Regarding the film, director Claude Lelouch stated, "Finalement is certainly a film about France, but also about the French, about family, about freedom, about solitude, about appearances, about music, about cinema." He stated that the character of Lino was inspired by "brilliant attorneys" such as Robert Badinter and Éric Dupond-Moretti.

Filming took place in Beaune and Saône-et-Loire in mid-2023. Filming also took place at the Stéphane Rolland fashion show at the Palais Garnier on 4 July 2023.

=== Music ===
Finalement (Bande originale du film)

Soundtrack album by Ibrahim Maalouf
- Released: 5 July 2024
- Genre: Jazz; orchestral
- Length: 67:41
- Label: Mister Ibé

Finalement (Bande originale du film)
No.	Title	Writer(s)	Performer(s)	Length
1.	"Thème de Lino"	Ibrahim Maalouf	Ibrahim Maalouf	4:50
2.	"Le roman de Marianne"	Ibrahim Maalouf	François Boulanger; Ibrahim Maalouf; Orchestre de la Garde Républicaine	3:23
3.	"Finalement (Par Kad Merad)"	Claude Lelouch; Didier Barbelivien; Laure Barbelivien	Didier Barbelivien; François Boulanger; Ibrahim Maalouf; Kad Merad; Orchestre de la Garde Républicaine	4:20
4.	"Le rêve de Lino"	Ibrahim Maalouf	Ibrahim Maalouf	2:02
5.	"Mi-temps"	Ibrahim Maalouf	Ibrahim Maalouf	0:53
6.	"La folie des sentiments (Par Barbara Pravi)"	Claude Lelouch; Didier Barbelivien; Laure Barbelivien	Barbara Pravi; Didier Barbelivien; François Boulanger; Ibrahim Maalouf; Orchestre de la Garde Républicaine	3:06
7.	"Thème de Lino en si bémol"	Ibrahim Maalouf	François Boulanger; Ibrahim Maalouf; Orchestre de la Garde Républicaine	5:08
8.	"Thème de Manon"	Ibrahim Maalouf	François Boulanger; Ibrahim Maalouf; Orchestre de la Garde Républicaine	3:28
9.	"La solitude d'une trompette"	Ibrahim Maalouf	François Boulanger; Ibrahim Maalouf; Orchestre de la Garde Républicaine	3:55
10.	"L'aventure sera toujours l'aventure (Par Barbara Pravi)"	Didier Barbelivien	Barbara Pravi; Didier Barbelivien; François Boulanger; Ibrahim Maalouf; Orchestre de la Garde Républicaine	2:46
11.	"Ça ne finira jamais"	Ibrahim Maalouf	François Boulanger; Ibrahim Maalouf; Orchestre de la Garde Républicaine	3:55
12.	"Finalement (Par Kad Merad et Barbara Pravi)"	Claude Lelouch; Didier Barbelivien; Laure Barbelivien	Barbara Pravi; Didier Barbelivien; François Boulanger; Ibrahim Maalouf; Kad Merad; Orchestre de la Garde Républicaine	4:20
13.	"Mélange de genres"	Didier Barbelivien; Ibrahim Maalouf	Didier Barbelivien; François Boulanger; Ibrahim Maalouf; Orchestre de la Garde Républicaine	7:03
14.	"Un piano et une trompette (Par Kad Merad)"	Didier Barbelivien; Ibrahim Maalouf	François Boulanger; Ibrahim Maalouf; Kad Merad; Orchestre de la Garde Républicaine	5:28
15.	"À toute allure"	Ibrahim Maalouf	Ibrahim Maalouf	4:57
16.	"Deuxième mi-temps"	Ibrahim Maalouf	Ibrahim Maalouf	1:34
17.	"Un piano et une trompette - Orchestral"	Ibrahim Maalouf	François Boulanger; Ibrahim Maalouf; Orchestre de la Garde Républicaine	5:27
18.	"When the Saints Go Marching In (Gospel)"	Traditional	Ibrahim Maalouf	1:06
Total length:				67:41

== Release ==
The film premiered at the 81st Venice International Film Festival on 2 September 2024.

== Reception ==
Boyd van Hoeij of Screen Daily wrote, "The sheer filmmaking pleasure and mastery of Lelouch behind the camera is especially evident in the first hour or so, with [Stéphane] Mazalaigue's editing deserving a special mention for how it keeps all of the different narrative layers laid out so clearly. But the plot's necessity to build to some kind of logical finale with increasingly higher stakes causes an initially smooth-running train to increasingly splutter."

Guy Lodge of Variety called the film "cluttered, often baffling" and wrote, "[Claude Lelouch] falls some way short of his glory days in this muddled, sentimental tale of a lawyer grappling with mortality and truth, but his devotees will find much to chew on."

Jan Lumholdt of Cineuropa called the film "a mixture of 'greatest hits' put in a bag of old tricks, shaken and stirred".

Alberto Crespi of La Repubblica gave the film four out of five stars, writing, "...[T]his new film, despite some slowness in the finale, is a delight. And above all it is a surprising film."

Movieplayer.it gave the film three out of five stars, calling it a "half-successful film" and writing, "...Lelouch's film manages to demonstrate the lability of human existence; a performance recited without scripts, but improvising, just like a jazz concert. Between constant leaps between reality and imagination, the film ultimately borders on an unsustainable paroxysm, which disorients and slows down the process of identification of a confused and not always happy audience."
