= The Starlings (duo) =

Belgian music duo

- Origin: Antwerp, Belgium
- Genres: Pop
- Years active: 2018–present
- Labels: Universal Music Group
- Members: Tom Dice; Kato Callebaut

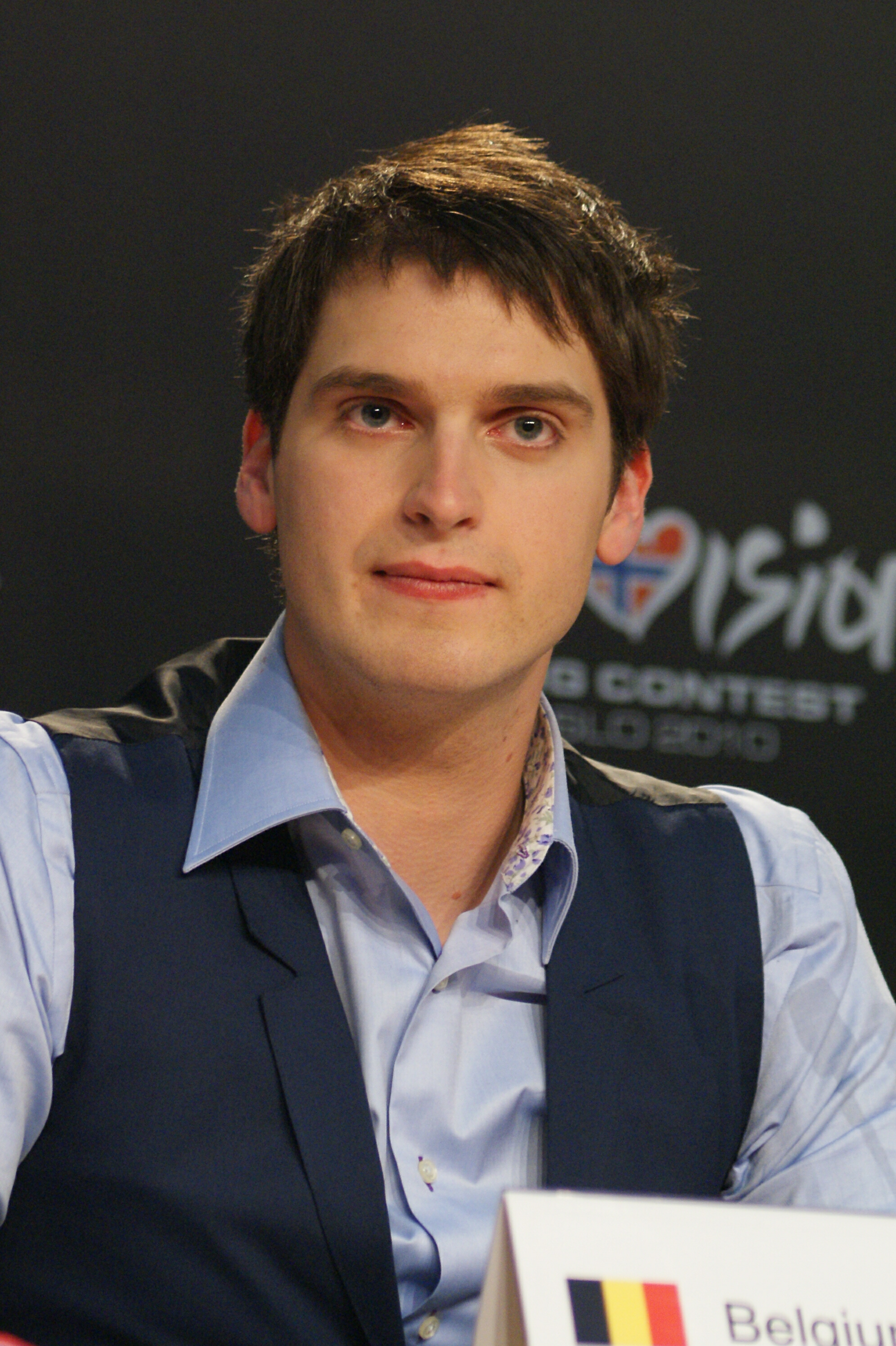
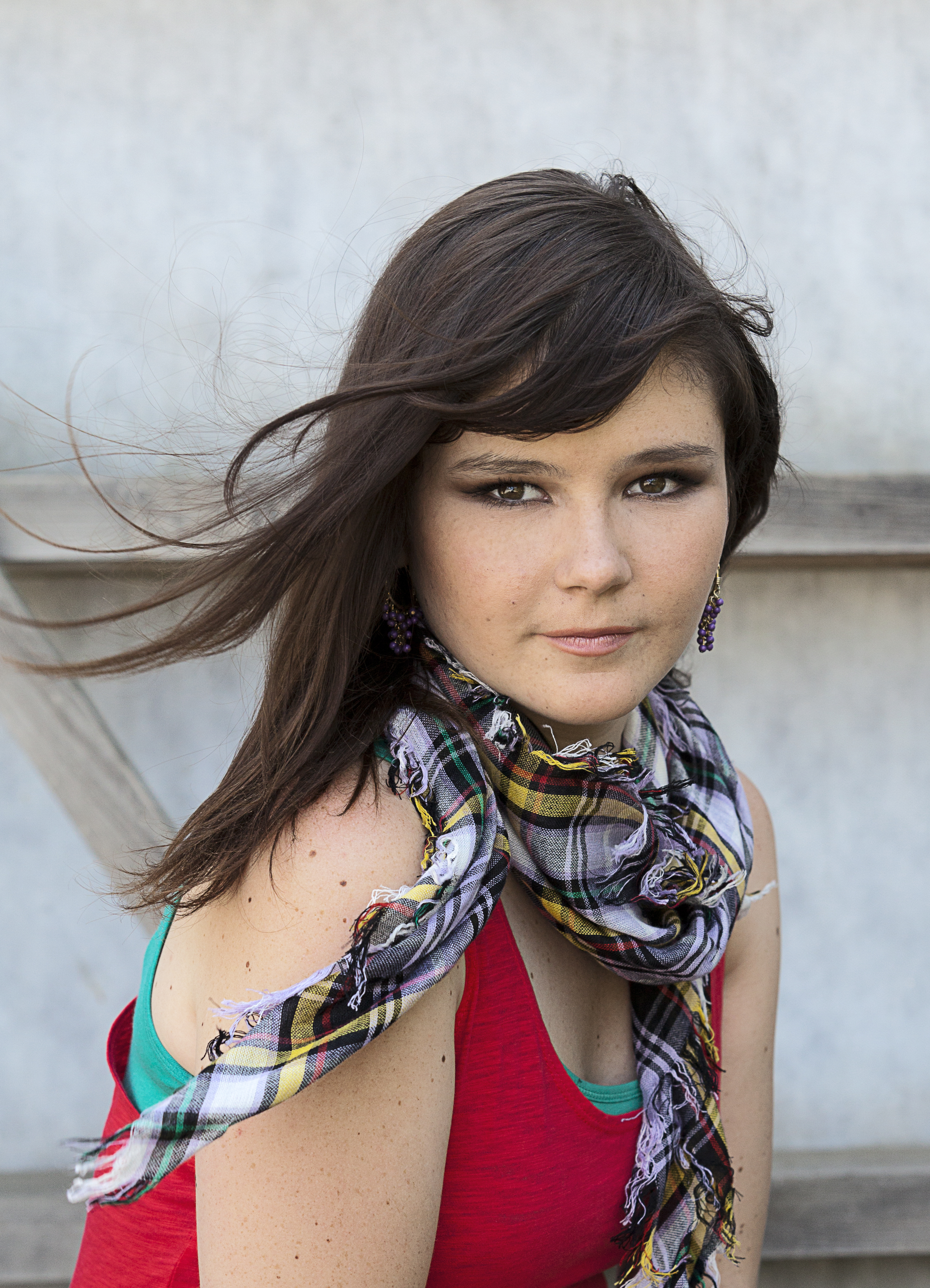
Tom Dice and Kato Callebaut

The Starlings are a Belgian musical duo founded in 2018, consisting of Tom Dice and Kato Callebaut. The group released their first single "Mine" in 2019. In 2020, the couple participated in the sixth season of Liefde voor muziek. In May 2020, they released their debut album Don't Look Back.

== Musical history ==
The two members of the group are well-known artists in Flanders. Dice previously represented Belgium at the Eurovision Song Contest 2010 with the song Me and My Guitar, while Callebaut participated in the fourth edition of the Flemish talent show Idool, finishing second. They met in 2013 when they recorded the single "Breaking Up Slow" together, and officially founded The Starlings in 2018.

In 2020, the duo took part in the Flemish TV show Liefde voor muziek, where they received praise for their reinterpretation of the song "Liefdeskapitein" by K3. In the same year they released their debut album Don't Look Back, which reached number 2 in the Flemish chart, selling 10,000 copies and obtaining a gold record. Their second album, Seaside, reached number 5 in the Flemish charts in 2022.

In November 2022, they were announced as one of seven participants in Eurosong 2023, the Belgian national selection for the Eurovision Song Contest 2023. They chose to perform in the final with the song "Rollercoaster". They came in second place with 277 points (94 points from the juries and 183 points from the televoting). After the show, Dice complained about the juries for disrespecting them.

== Discography ==
=== Studio albums ===
- Don't Look Back (2020)
- Seaside (2022)

=== Singles ===
- "Mine" (2019)
- "Bury a Friend" (2019)
- "Never Alone" (2019)
- "On My Way" (2019)
- "My Town" (2020)
- "Die Happy" (2020)
- "Heal" (2020)
- "Happiness" featuring Ides Moon and Milo Meskens (2020)
- "Magic" (2021)
- "Just Come Home" (2022)
- "Jericho" (2022)
- "Rome" (2022)
- "Gold" (2022)
- "Get to You" (2022)
- "Rollercoaster" (2023)
