= Pierre Leroux (author) =

Canadian novelist, journalist and screenwriter

Pierre Leroux (born 1958 in Montreal, Quebec) is a Canadian novelist, journalist and screenwriter.

== Bibliography ==
- 1996 : Le Rire des femmes, ISBN 2-921775-25-5
- 2004 : Cher éditeur (éditions Albin Michel)
- 2010 : Portrait de l'artiste en caméléon in « A Disposition for a Tale of an Investigation about an Ordinary Man » (Dutch Art Institute)

== Selective filmography ==
- 2000 : One 4 all by Claude Lelouch
- 2002 : And Now… Ladies and Gentlemen by Claude Lelouch
- 2021 : Love is Better Than Life by Claude Lelouch
- 2024 : Finalement by Claude Lelouch
