= Chérine =

Belgian singer (born 1995)

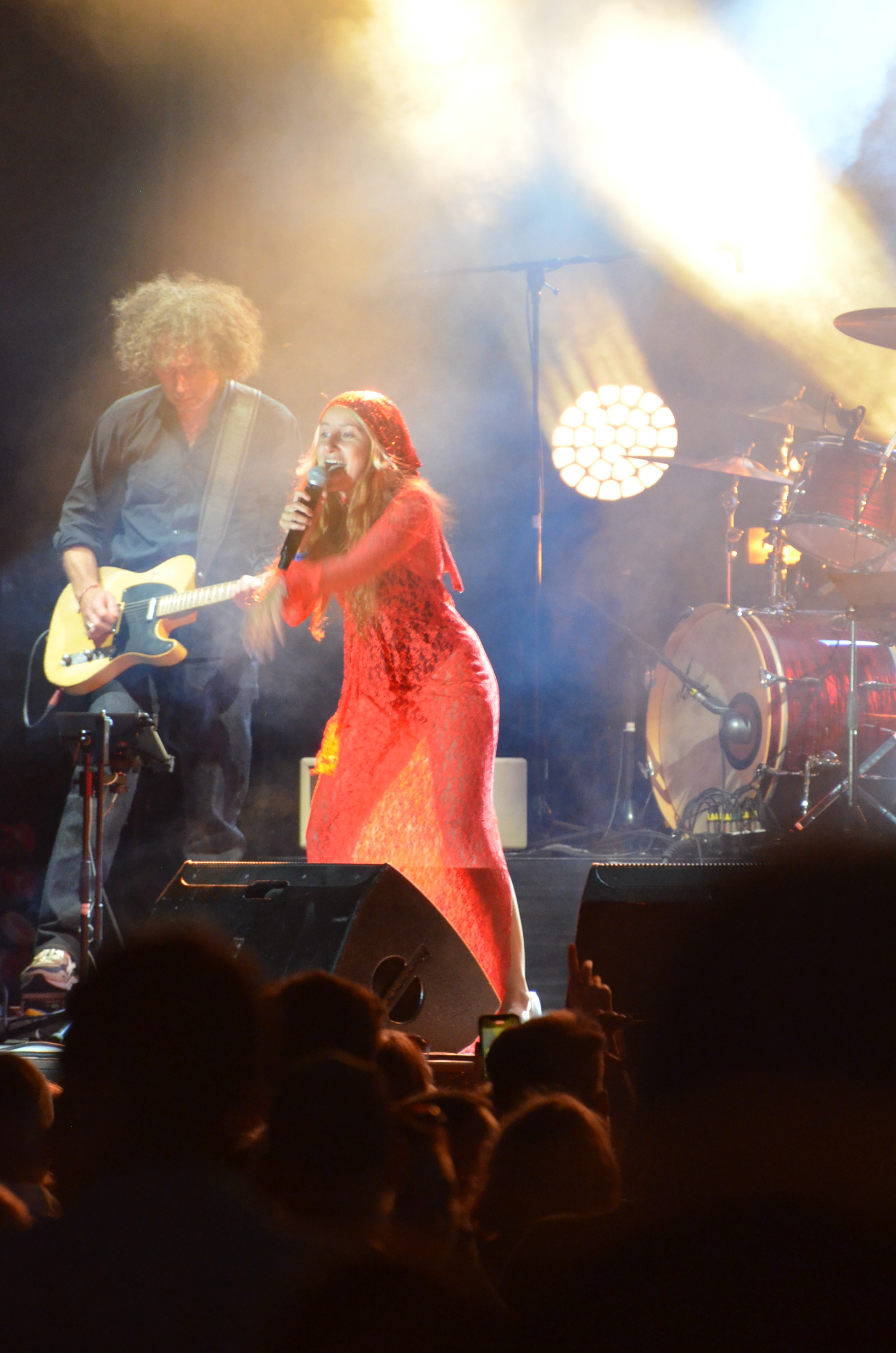
- Chérine (2024)

Background information
- Born: Chérine Mroue; 5 October 1995 (age 30); Edegem, Belgium
- Genres: French pop
- Occupations: Singer; songwriter
- Years active: 2017–present
- Label: Sony Music
- Website: cherine.be

Chérine Mroue (born 5 October 1995), known mononymously as Chérine, is a Belgian singer and songwriter.

== Early life ==
Mroue was born on 5 October 1995 in Edegem, Antwerp to a Belgian mother and a Lebanese father. When she was three years old, her father abandoned the family and returned to Lebanon. He died in 2022. Mroue was raised bilingually and is fluent in Dutch, French and English. At a young age, she was diagnosed with attention deficit hyperactivity disorder (ADHD).

== Career ==
In 2017, Mroue was a participant in the fifth season of The Voice van Vlaanderen, the Flemish version of The Voice franchise. She advanced to the live shows of the competition, but was eliminated before the final. In 2019, she auditioned for the eighth season of the French version of The Voice, but none of the judges turned around. In 2022, she auditioned again with the song "Drivers License" by Olivia Rodrigo. This time, all four judges turned around. She was eliminated in the Cross Battles round. Later that year, Mroue was a finalist in the Belgian singing competition Rising Star organised by the radio station MNM.

The Voice performances and results
Season		Round	Song	Original artist	Result
Flanders	5th (2017)	Blind Auditions	"Unsteady"	X Ambassadors	Joined team Alex Callier
Flanders	5th (2017)	The Battles	"Sorry"	Justin Bieber	Advanced
Flanders	5th (2017)	Live Shows	"Easy Come Easy Go"	Alice on the Roof	Advanced
Flanders	5th (2017)	Live Shows	"Lovefool"	The Cardigans	Eliminated
France	8th (2019)	Blind Auditions	"Speed"	Zazie	Eliminated
France	11th (2022)	Blind Auditions	"Drivers License"	Olivia Rodrigo	Joined team Amel Bent
France	11th (2022)	The Battles	"The Reason"	Hoobastank	Advanced
France	11th (2022)	Cross Battles	"Break My Heart"	Dua Lipa	Eliminated

In November 2022, Mroue was announced as one of seven participants in Eurosong 2023, the Belgian national selection for the Eurovision Song Contest 2023. Her entry "Ça m'ennuie pas" (transl. "It Doesn't Bore Me") finished in fourth place with 268 points in the final on 14 January 2023. The song was co-written with William Rousseau and François Welgryn and is about her ADHD, which, according to Mroue, makes her get bored easily.

== Discography ==
=== Singles ===
Title	Year	Peak chart positions	Album
Title	Year	BEL (FL)	Album
"Ça m'ennuie pas"	2023	25	Non-album singles
"Mon étoile"	2023	—	Non-album singles
"L'âge que je n'ai pas"	2023	—	Non-album singles
"HYPER"	2023	—	Non-album singles
