= On n'enferme pas les oiseaux =

Studio album by Barbara Pravi
- Released: 27 August 2021
- Recorded: June/July 2021
- Studio: Paris
- Genre: French pop; chanson
- Length: 37:00
- Language: French
- Label: Capitol Music France
- Producer: Barbara Pravi; Elodie Filleul; Jérémie Arcache

Barbara Pravi chronology
Les prières (2021)	On n'enferme pas les oiseaux (2021)	Les prières: Racines (2021)

Singles from On n'enferme pas les oiseaux
- 1. "Voilà" Released: 6 November 2020; 2. "Le jour se lève" Released: 23 June 2021; 3. "L'homme et l'oiseau" Released: 8 July 2021; 4. "Saute" Released: 27 August 2021

On n'enferme pas les oiseaux (transl. "We Don't Lock Up the Birds") is the debut studio album by French singer-songwriter Barbara Pravi. It was released on 27 August 2021 by Capitol Music France. Following the release of three extended plays and her representation in the Eurovision Song Contest 2021 with the song "Voilà", Pravi began working on a full-length album as her next work. The record's title comes from a lyric found in the song "L'homme et l'oiseau", which she stated is "because nothing is more majestic than the spreading of one's own wings". On n'enferme pas les oiseaux is a French pop and chanson album that explores themes of love, feminism and self-affirmation.

== Background and release ==
After releasing singles and an extended play with Jules Jaconelli on Capitol Music France in 2017, Pravi switched direction to French chanson music, which was 'more to her own taste'.

In 2021, Pravi's song "Voilà", composed alongside Igit and Lilie Poe, was chosen to represent France in the Eurovision Song Contest 2021 in Rotterdam. She finished in second place, scoring 499 points, thereby achieving France's best Eurovision result since 1991.

Following the contest, Pravi continued to work with Elodie Filleu and Jérémie Arcache on her debut full-length album, continuing to write with Igit and Poe, who co-wrote "Voilà", as well as Vincha and Arcache. Two further music videos were released after "Voilà", to create a triptych of videos before the album's release; "Le jour se lève" and "L'homme et l'oiseau". The album was released on 27 August 2021 on CD and digital download, and 8 October 2021 on vinyl.

== Critical reception ==
Professional ratings
Review scores
Source	Rating
Le Soir	3/4 stars
The Yorkshire Times	4/5 stars
Gigwise	9/10 stars

The album was met with critical acclaim upon release. Jeremy Williams-Chalmers of The Yorkshire Times highlighted its distinct sound, concluding that the record "is a stunning collection that showcases an artist comfortable in her own skin and ready to explore many musical terrains." Martin Leitch in a Gigwise vinyl review of the album praised Pravi's songwriting and lyricism, adding that "On n'enferme pas les oiseaux boasts the compulsive immediacy of all the best pop, whilst managing in the same breath to command a certain distinguished subtlety that sets Pravi out as an artist with a clear creative vision."

== Track listing ==
Credits adapted from the album's liner notes.

Standard edition
No.	Title	Writer(s)	Length
1.	"Voilà"	Barbara Pravi; Igit; Lili Poe	2:57
2.	"Le jour se lève"	Pravi; Vincha	3:01
3.	"Interlude"	Jérémie Arcache	1:27
4.	"L'homme et l'oiseau"	Pravi; Vincha	3:36
5.	"Saute"	Pravi; Vincha; Arcache	3:34
6.	"Je l'aime, je l'aime, je l'aime"	Pravi; Igit	3:21
7.	"La vague"	Pravi; Vincha; Arcache	3:06
8.	"La femme"	Pravi; Vincha	3:06
9.	"Mes maladroits"	Pravi; Igit; Arcache	3:43
10.	"La ritournelle (de la vieille qui oublie)"	Pravi; Igit; Vincha	4:38
11.	"Prière pour rester belle"	Pravi; Poe	4:45
Total length:			37:00

== Charts ==
Weekly chart performance for "On n'enferme pas les oiseaux"
Chart (2021)	Peak position
Belgian Albums (Ultratop Flanders)	52
Belgian Albums (Ultratop Wallonia)	8
Dutch Albums (Album Top 100)	35
French Albums (SNEP)	6
Swiss Albums (Schweizer Hitparade)	32

== Certifications ==
Certifications for "On n'enferme pas les oiseaux"
Region	Certification	Certified units/sales
France (SNEP)	Gold	50,000^{‡}
^{‡} Sales+streaming figures based on certification alone.
