= Emma Kok =

Dutch singer (born 2008)

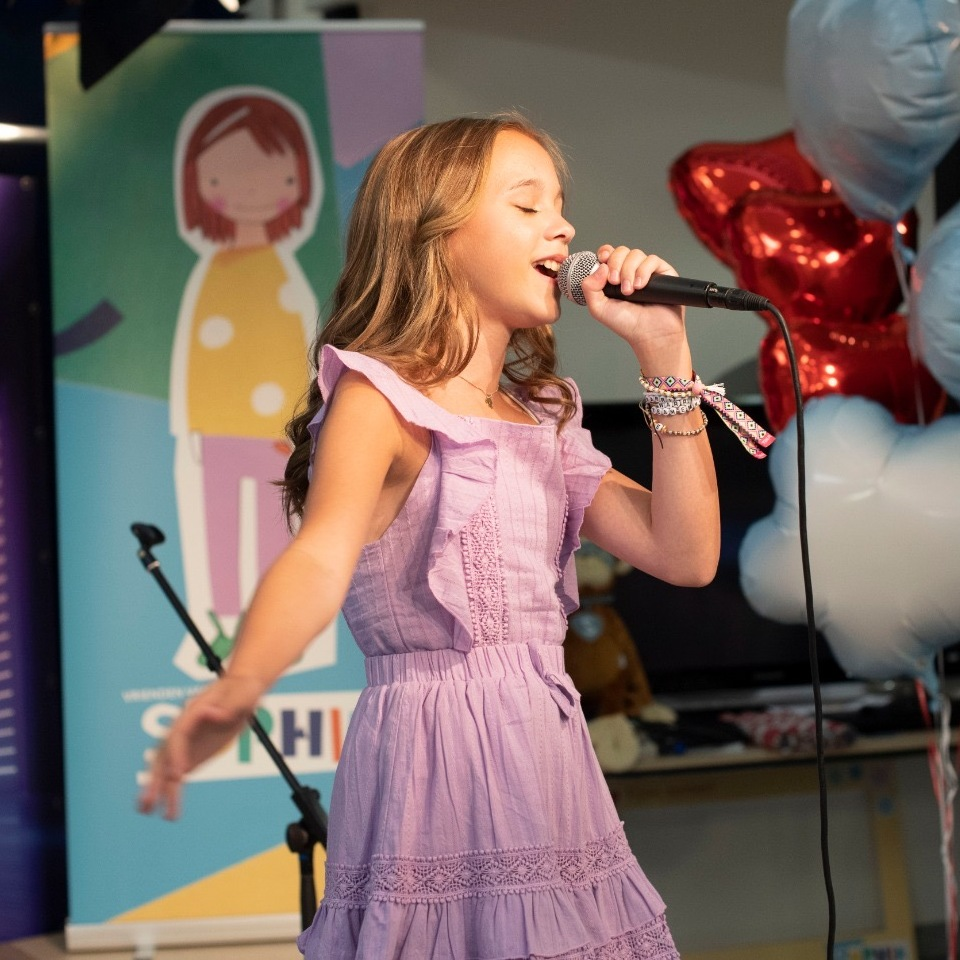
- Kok in 2022

Background information
- Born: 12 March 2008 (age 18); Maastricht, Netherlands
- Origin: Kerkrade, Netherlands
- Genre: Pop
- Occupations: Singer; songwriter
- Instrument: Vocals
- Years active: 2021–present
- Website: emmakok.com

Emma Kok (born 12 March 2008) is a Dutch singer. She rose to prominence in 2021 after winning the tenth season of The Voice Kids. In 2023, her performance of "Voilà" with André Rieu and the Johann Strauss Orchestra went viral, amassing more than 115 million views on YouTube.

== Early life ==
Kok was born in Maastricht and grew up in Kerkrade. Her parents, Vico and Nathalie Kok, are both musicians who met at a concert hall. She has two siblings: a brother named Enzo and a sister named Sophie. Enzo is a violinist and Sophie is a classical singer.

She has gastroparesis and has been dependent on a feeding tube since the age of nine months. She stated that she had been bullied in school because of her illness and consequential smaller stature.

== Career ==
=== 2021–2022: The Voice Kids ===
In June 2021, Kok won the tenth season of The Voice Kids under the coaching of rapper Ali B. In August of that year, she sang at a benefit concert for the victims of the 2021 European floods in Limburg.

On 11 March 2022, Kok released her first single, "Laat Mij Een Vlinder Zijn" (Let Me Be A Butterfly).

=== 2023–present: Ministars, "Voilà", André Rieu collaborations ===
In February 2023, Kok won the inaugural season of Ministars with her rendition of "Voilà" by Barbara Pravi. Dutch violinist and conductor André Rieu, also from Maastricht, was reportedly so impressed with Kok's performance that he invited her to perform "Voilà" at his annual concert series at the Vrijthof in July 2023. This performance soon went viral, amassing 2.6 million views in five days. She went on to release three covers with Rieu in 2023: "Voilà", "White Christmas", and "All I Want for Christmas Is You". She also participated in Rieu's Christmas concerts at the MECC Maastricht in December 2023. On Christmas, she was a guest on Die Helene Fischer Show, where she sang "Voilà" with Helene Fischer.

Kok joined André Rieu on his world tour beginning in January 2024. On 24 April 2024, she was a presenter at the Musical Awards Gala in Leusden. The following month, on Liberation Day, she sang at the annual 5 Mei-Concert on the Amstel in Amsterdam. The concert was attended by King Willem-Alexander and Queen Máxima. In October 2024, Kok was confirmed to be joining André Rieu on his forthcoming tour in 2025.

== Other work ==
In 2023, Kok founded Gastrostars, a foundation to help patients with gastroparesis.

In October 2025 she released her autobiography under the title Emma - Never Lose Hope.

== Discography ==
=== Albums ===
| Title | Year | Note |
|---|---|---|
| "Live in Concertgebouw" | 2026 | Live recording of her concert in Het Concertgebouw, Amsterdam |

=== Singles ===
| Title | Year | Album |
|---|---|---|
| "Laat Mij Een Vlinder Zijn" | 2022 | Non-album single |
| "Strijder" | 2023 | Non-album single |
| "Voilà" (with André Rieu and the Johann Strauss Orchestra) | 2023 | Non-album single |
| "White Christmas" (with André Rieu and the Johann Strauss Orchestra) | 2023 | Non-album single |
| "All I Want for Christmas Is You" (with André Rieu and the Johann Strauss Orchestra) | 2023 | Non-album single |
| "Voilà" (with Helene Fischer) | 2023 | Non-album single |
| "Dancing On The Stars" (with André Rieu and the Johann Strauss Orchestra) | 2024 | Non-album single |
| "Jade" | 2025 | Non-album single |
| "Laissez-Moi" | 2026 | Non-album single |
