= Barbara Pravi =

French singer (born 1993)

- Barbara Pravi at the 2026 Cannes Film Festival

Background information
- Born: Barbara Piévic; 10 April 1993 (age 33); Paris, France
- Origin: Montmartre, Paris, France
- Genres: Chanson; French pop
- Occupations: Singer; songwriter; actress
- Instrument: Vocals
- Years active: 2014–present
- Labels: Capitol Music France; Virgin; UMG
- Partner: Antoine Molkhou (2021–2024)

Barbara Piévic (born 10 April 1993), known professionally as Barbara Pravi, is a French singer, songwriter, and actress. She represented France in the Eurovision Song Contest 2021 with the song "Voilà", securing second place, the best result for France since 1991. Her debut album On n'enferme pas les oiseaux was released on 27 August 2021.

As a songwriter, Pravi has written songs for a number of artists, including Yannick Noah, Julie Zenatti, Chimène Badi, Kylie Minogue and Jaden Smith. She has additionally composed for Valentina and Lissandro, winners of the Junior Eurovision Song Contest, and starred in Claude Lelouch's film Finalement (2024).

== Early life ==
Barbara Piévic (Serbian: Барбара Пјевић, Barbara Pjević) was born in Paris on 10 April 1993 to Emmanuelle and Marc Piévic. Her family primarily consists of artists and musicians. Pravi's father is of Serbian and Moroccan Jewish descent, while her mother is of Polish Jewish and Iranian origin. She also has a younger sister, Clémence Piévic, who is a psychologist. Clémence and Barbara also regularly donate and spread awareness to charities.

Pravi grew up in Asnières-sur-Seine, before moving to the Montmartre neighbourhood of Paris. She has notably also lived in Strasbourg–Saint-Denis and Burgundy.

== Career ==
=== 2014–2018: Early career ===
Pravi began her music career in 2014, after meeting French musician Jules Jaconelli. With Jaconelli, she began composing songs. The following year, she released an original song titled "Amour Impoli", which led to her signing a contract with Capitol Music France. She adopted the stage name Barbara Pravi from the Serbian word pravi (Serbian Cyrillic: прави, lit. 'real', 'authentic', in the masculine), as a homage to her Serbian grandfather. Pravi has cited her musical influences as Barbara, Jacques Brel, Georges Brassens, Françoise Hardy, and Aragon. Upon beginning her professional recording career, Pravi performed on the soundtrack of the French version of the Swiss film Heidi with the song "On m'appelle Heidi" and afterwards was cast as Solange Duhamel in the musical show Un été 44 in November 2016, performing songs written by Jean-Jacques Goldman, Charles Aznavour and Maxime Le Forestier.

In 2017, Pravi released her first official single "Pas grandir". The single was later included on her self-titled debut extended play, which was released the following year. Also in 2017, Pravi starred in the television film La Sainte famille, as the role of Marion, which was later broadcast on France 2 in December 2019. From 2017 until 2018, Pravi performed on the 55 Tour, supporting French singer Florent Pagny. At the end of 2018, Pravi decided to alter her musical style by adopting a more traditional French chanson style, rather than the pop style that had dominated her early releases.

Along with writing and composing her own songs, Pravi has written for several other artists including Yannick Noah, Julie Zenatti, Chimène Badi, Jaden Smith, Louane and Florent Pagny.

=== 2019-2021: Reviens pour l'hiver, Eurovision, Junior Eurovision ===
In the year 2019 she wrote the song "Bim Bam toi" with Igit, with which Carla Lazzari represented France at the Junior Eurovision Song Contest 2019 in Gliwice and finally took 5th place; the sixth in jury vote and the third in the public vote. "Bim Bam Toi", reposted millions of times on TikTok, which won France their first TikTok golden disc in history. The song was later used in the video game Fortnite.

In February 2020, she released her sophomore EP Reviens pour l'hiver, which consists of 5 tracks. On 8 March of the same year, she released "Chair".

In the year 2020, she wrote the song "J’imagine" with Igit, with which Valentina Tronel represented France at the Junior Eurovision Song Contest 2020 in Warsaw and won the competition. The song gave France its first Junior Eurovision Song Contest victory.

In December 2020, Pravi was announced to compete in the French national final for the Eurovision Song Contest 2021. On 31 January 2021 she won the competition, gaining the right to represent France at the contest in Rotterdam and finally took 2nd place; but only reached third place in the televoting. Ultimately, Måneskin won the contest by a margin of 25 points, representing Italy. "Voilà" achieved France's best placement at the contest since 1991 as well as the highest points ever for a French entry in the competition (499).

=== 2021–2023: On n'enferme pas les oiseaux, Francophonie Games, publishing and acting debut ===
In July 2021, Pravi announced her first international tour for her debut studio album, On n'enferme pas les oiseaux, which came out on 27 August 2021.

Pravi performed "Voilà" as an interval act at the Junior Eurovision Song Contest 2021, which took place on 19 December in Paris. Pravi also performed the song "L'homme et l'oiseau"at the 37th edition of the Victoires de la Musique, where she went on to win the Female Revelation of the Year award.

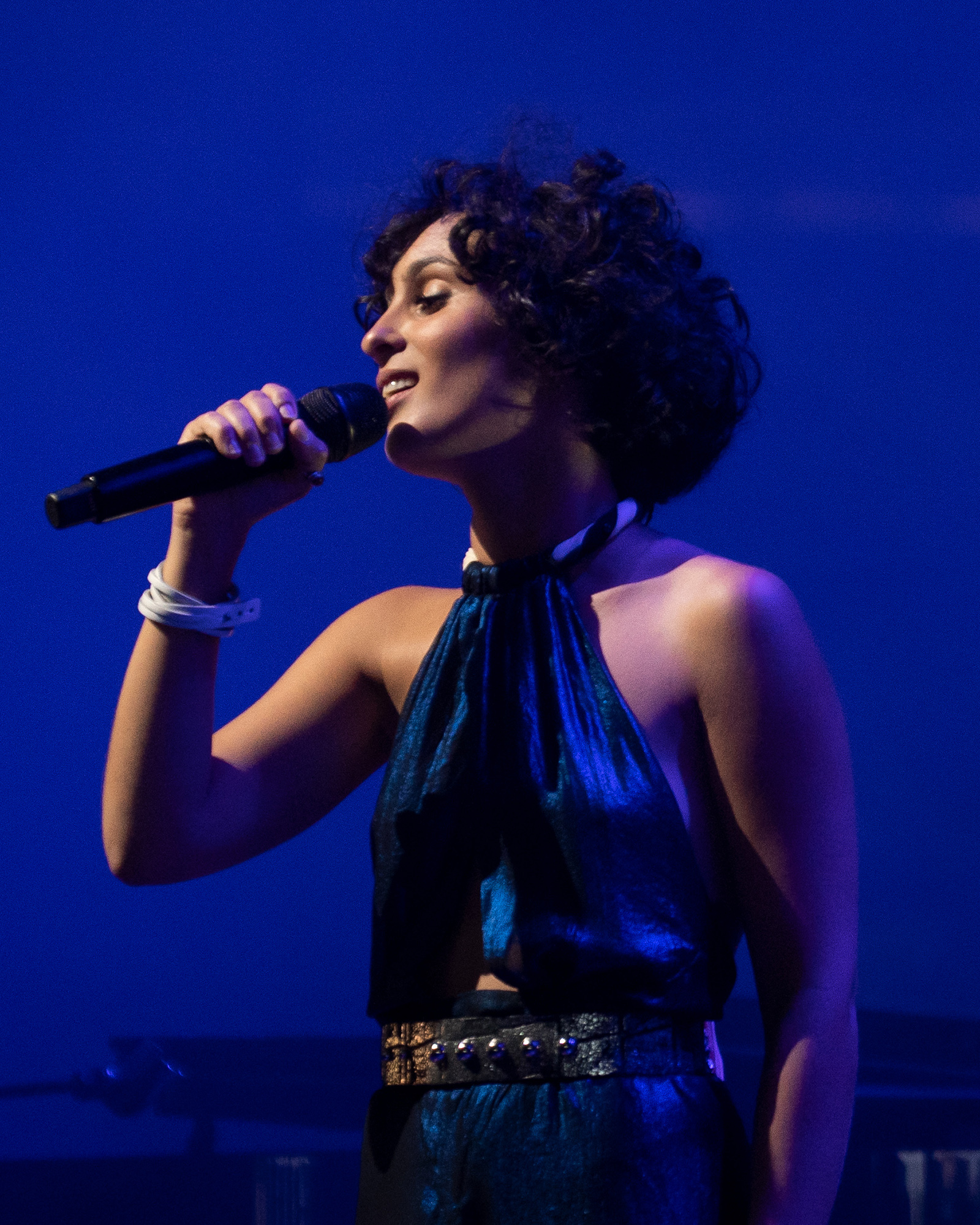
Pravi performing at a concert in July 2022.

In 2022, Pravi continued releasing songs, including "Prière pour soi" for International Women's Day, and "365", which is dedicated to her fans. Pravi also wrote the song "Oh maman!" with Frédéric Château, with which Lissandro Formica represented France at the Junior Eurovision Song Contest 2022 in Yerevan and ultimately won, bringing France its second Junior Eurovision win.

On 21 December, Pravi was announced as Florence in the TV film Adieu vinyle, set to be shown on France 2 on 18 September 2023, after being premiered at the Angoulême Festival on 26 August 2023.

Pravi announced on 6 January 2023 that she had signed to Virgin Records France after eight years at Capitol Music France. She revealed two days later that she was in the process of writing and recording her second studio album.

On 13 January 2023, Pravi was announced as a temporary host on the BBC Sounds podcast show Music Life. The first episode she hosted included November Ultra, Pi Ja Ma, Yaël Naïm and Melissa Lauveux as guests, and the second episode described Pravi's tour playlist, "Sur la route" (English: On the road). This appearance followed her French radio debut on RTL2's Foudre with Waxx, during which she co-hosted several episodes with Waxx.

In late February 2023, Pravi announced her first book, Lève-toi, alongside a single of the same name. A collaboration with Editions Julliard, author Huriya Asmahan (who wrote the preface) and Aref Al-Haidari, Lève-toi was written in French and Arabic. The song was released on 8 March, while the book was released the following day. In late May, Pravi was announced to star in Finalement, a film directed by Claude Lelouch.

On 28 July, Pravi was announced as the opening act of the 9th edition of the Francophonie Games. which took place in Kinshasa, the capital of the Democratic Republic of the Congo, the same night. She sang the song "Lève toi" at the ceremony.

On 27 August, Pravi announced a collaboration with Salvador Sobral for his new song "Les eaux qui me gardent" which was released on 29 August.

=== 2024-present: La Pieva and continued acting career ===
On 19 January 2024 she released her new single "Bravo" talking about self-confidence.

On 8 March, Pravi released "Marianne" with Persian singer Golfshifteh Farahani. Soon later, she was announced as part of the cast for the France Televisions TV-series " Rebelle : les aventures de la jeune George Sand" (in French) which has also been trademarked as "GEORGE: Untamed Spirit" (in English).

On 6 June, Pravi announced her sophomore (second) album "La Pieva" (named after her family name, Piévic) and the albums eponymous song that would be released on 7 June. She later announced the twelve song tracklist, which includes previously released singles.

On 23 July, Pravi (alongside Claude Lelouch and Kad Merad) announced that their upcoming movie Finalement, set to release on 13 November, has been nominated for the 81st Mostra de Venice Fiction Movie competition, being one of three French movies to be selected. Pravi plays the character Barbara as well as singing the entire soundtrack for the movie. On 23 August, the soundtrack for Finalement was released on all streaming platforms, with the soundtrack directed by Ibrahim Maalouf and Didier Barbelivien.

In October 2024, she commenced the first leg of the La Pieva tour, named after her sophomore album of the same name. On 23 October, it was announced that she would be on the French talent show Star Academy. Since October 2024, she has been a regular guest on Vivement dimanche to promote Claude Lelouch's Finalement, which has now been dubbed in English and Italian.

== Personal life ==
In her adolescence, Pravi endured three abortions in "terrible conditions". Pravi's husband at the time, who remains anonymous, was abusive towards her; they are now divorced. In summer 2024, she announced that she had recently ended a three-year relationship with a man named Antoine.

=== Health ===
Pravi has been open about her experiences undergoing abortions in her youth. After her third abortion, she was diagnosed with hyperfertility. Pravi has also experienced abuse from former partners.

In 2022, she was also diagnosed with depression.

=== Literature and law ===
Pravi has a deep connection with Persian literature, as her maternal grandfather is of Iranian descent. As a survivor of domestic violence, Pravi is active in the fight to end violence against women. She has frequently contributed to music initiatives intended to promote causes involved with women's rights. Pravi was also invited to perform "Notes pour trop tard" and speak at Emlyon Business School through TEDx to speak about her career and how she found self-confidence.

== Philanthropy ==
In 2018, Pravi participated (as part of 39 Femmes; a project group which was formed of 39 French female musicians) in the song "Debout les femmes", which raised money for charitable causes. The song was later used in the Amazon Prime movie Flashback.

She is also the marraine (godmother) of the charity La Collective Arles.

In October 2024, she participated in the Belgian charity show CAP48Heures, singing her latest song "Qui j'étais" as well as co-hosting their 48-hour live stream. Ultimately, it was announced that over 6 million euros had been raised.

== Discography ==
=== Studio albums ===
Title	Details	Peak chart positions				
Title	Details	FRA	BEL (FL)	BEL (WA)	NLD	SWI
On n'enferme pas les oiseaux	Released: 27 August 2021; Label: Capitol Music France; Format: Digital download, CD, LP, streaming	6	52	8	35	32
La pieva	Released: 6 September 2024; Label: Virgin France, Universal Music Group; Format: Digital, CD, LP, streaming	26	—	64	76	—
"—" denotes an album that did not chart or was not released in that territory.

=== Extended plays ===
Title	Details
Barbara Pravi	Released: 15 June 2018; Label: Capitol Music France; Format: Digital download, CD, streaming
Reviens pour l'hiver	Released: 7 February 2020; Label: Capitol Music France; Format: Digital download, CD, streaming
Les prières	Released: 8 March 2021; Label: Capitol Music France; Format: Digital download, LP, streaming
Les prières - racines	Released: 26 November 2021; Label: Capitol Music France; Format: Digital download, LP, streaming
Les prières - guérir	Released: 6 January 2023; Label: Virgin Records (Universal Music Division); Format: Digital download, LP, Streaming

=== Singles ===
Title	Year	Peak chart positions										Album or EP
Title	Year	FRA	BEL (FL)	BEL (WA)	GER	IRE	NLD	NOR	SWE	SWI	UK	Album or EP
"On m'appelle Heidi"	2016	—	—	—	—	—	—	—	—	—	—	Heidi
"Pas grandir"	2017	—	—	—	—	—	—	—	—	—	—	Barbara Pravi
"You Are the Reason" (French Duet Version) (with Calum Scott)	2018	—	—	—	—	—	—	—	—	—	—	Barbara Pravi
"Le Malamour"	2019	—	—	—	—	—	—	—	—	—	—	Non-album single
"Reviens pour l'hiver"	2020	—	—	—	—	—	—	—	—	—	—	Reviens pour l'hiver
"Chair"	2020	—	—	—	—	—	—	—	—	—	—	Non-album single
"Voilà"	2020	24	36	34	62	40	3	19	18	24	62	On n'enferme pas les oiseaux
"Le jour se lève"	2021	—	—	—	—	—	—	—	—	—	—	On n'enferme pas les oiseaux
"L'homme et l'oiseau"	2021	—	—	—	—	—	—	—	—	—	—	On n'enferme pas les oiseaux
"Saute"	2021	—	—	—	—	—	—	—	—	—	—	On n'enferme pas les oiseaux
"Priére pour soi"	2022	—	—	—	—	—	—	—	—	—	—	Non-album singles
"365"	2022	—	—	—	—	—	—	—	—	—	—	Non-album singles
"Lève-toi"	2023	—	—	—	—	—	—	—	—	—	—	Non-album singles
"Bravo"	2024	—	—	—	—	—	—	—	—	—	—	La pieva
"Marianne"	2024	—	—	—	—	—	—	—	—	—	—	Non-album single
"La pieva (Chez moi)"	2024	—	—	—	—	—	—	—	—	—	—	La pieva
"Exister"	2024	—	—	—	—	—	—	—	—	—	—	La pieva
"Qui j'étais"	2024	—	—	—	—	—	—	—	—	—	—	La pieva
"L'exil et l'asile"	2025	—	—	—	—	—	—	—	—	—	—	Non-album singles
"Des éclats dans les nuages"	2025	—	—	—	—	—	—	—	—	—	—	Non-album singles
"Où es-tu?"	2025	—	—	—	—	—	—	—	—	—	—	Non-album singles
"Prière pour reconstruire"	2026	—	—	—	—	—	—	—	—	—	—	Non-album singles
"—" denotes a recording that did not chart or was not released in that territory.

=== Soundtracks ===
Year	Album name	Songs Featured
2015	Heidi	"On m'appelle Heidi"
2016	Un Été 44	"Ma chambre", "Les Rochambelles", "Juste", "L'amour est tombé", "Lili sans sommeil", "Whisky vodka", "Paris au ciel d'été", "Seulement connu du Dieu", "Ne m'oublie pas", "Passer le nuit"
2021	Flashback	"Debout les femmes"
2023	Adieu Vinyle	"Adieu Vinyle"
2024	Finalement	"La folie de sentiments", "L'aventure sera toujour l'aventure", "Finalement" (with Kad Merad)
2025	On ira	"Voyage Voyage", TBA
2025	Peau d'homme	TBA

=== Featurings ===
Year	Song title	Other featured artists
2018	You Are The Reason	Calum Scott
2018	Debout les femmes	39 femmes (a group with 39 french artists)
2019	À Vide	Molitor
2020	Le temps de revenir à la vie	Terrenoire
2020	La fin du monde	Terrenoire
2021	Mi Amor	Quentin Mosimann, Antoine Delvig
2022	Les nouveaux rêves	Florent Pagny
2023	Les eaux qui me gardent	Salvador Sobral
2024	Homme	Coline Rio, Camille, Clou, Emily Loizeau, La Chica, Laura Cahen, Nach, Poppy Fusee, Raphaële Lannadére

=== Songs used in games ===
Year	Song	Game	Artist(s)
2021	Bim Bam Toi	Fortnite	Carla Lazzari
2021	Voilà	Let's Sing 2021 (French exclusive)	Barbara Pravi

=== Songwriting credits ===
- Excluding songs with Pravi as the main vocalist

Song title	Artist
Partons	Anaïs Delva
Sois	Anaïs Delva
L'un près de l'autre	Noee
Le bien le mal	Aöme
Ton nom déjà	Vaimalama
Loin d'ici	Angelina Nava
Ma voie	Angelina Nava
Maman me dit	Angelina Nava
C'est si beau ici	Angelina Nava
On oublie le reste	Jenifer, Kylie Minogue
Si je le dis	Chimène Badi, Antoine Delis
Bim Bam Toi	Carla Lazarri
Ce qui m'aime	Chimène Badi
Baraka	Yannick Noah
Pervers narcissique	Black M
J'imagine	Valentina Tronel
La fin du monde	Terrenoire
Pain	Jaden Smith
Faites-nous confiance	Valentina Tronel
On verra plus tard	Carla Lazzari
Aujourd'hui j'arrête	Carla Lazzari
Roller Coaster	Carla Lazzari
Pas folle	Carla Lazzari
Quand elle rentera	Florent Pagny
Les nouveaux rêves	Florent Pagny
Oh Maman!	Lissandro Formica
Alors chut	Carla Lazzari
Bim Bam Toi	Kidz Bop
Voilà (cover version)	Emma Kok, André Rieu
Voilà (cover version)	Emilio Piano
Éte beau	Ali
Tha S'Agapo	George Perris
Dear Parents	Tali Golergant

== Filmography ==
=== As an actress/notable roles as self ===
Year	Title	Role	Notes
2015	Heidi	Heidi (singing voice)	Singing voice only
2016	Un été 44	Solange Duhamel	Musical role
2017	La Sainte Famille	Marion	TV movie
2021	Barbara Pravi, voilà qui je suis	Self	TV special
2021	Révélations	Self	Amazon Music Documentary
2023	Adieu Vinyle	Florence	TV movie
2024	Finalement	Barbara	Cinema role
2024	On fait quoi maintenant?	Self	Weekly web series leading up to the release of La Pieva
2024	Chez moi, Sur la route	Self	Weekly web series
2025	On Ira	To be announced	Soundtrack, actress
2025	La rebelle : Les aventures de la jeune George Sand	Marie Dorval	4x52 TV series (Francophone title)
Unknown	Finalement, ça ne finira jamais	Barbara	Cinema role, sequel to Finalement

=== Other roles ===
Pravi got involved in the making of the film Finalement in 2021 as an actress but also behind the scenes. She worked as multiple roles for this movie.

Her other roles in TV shows, movies, podcasts and music videos are available on her IMDb page.

== Bibliography ==
Year	Book name	Genre
2023	Lève toi (with Huriya Asmahan)	Poetry
2023	Pour tout l'art du monde (with Saphia Wespheal)	Autobiography
2025	Rue de la gaîté (main author: Axel Auliert)	Novel - credited as co-editor
2025 (rumored release date)	TBA	TBA

== Radio and podcasts ==
Year	Show Title	Role	Category
2022-?	Music Life	Host	Radio, BBC Sounds
2024	Les vagues	Temporary co-host	Podcast
2024	Le playlist	Host (unsure if permanent)	Radio Show
2024	La bibliothèque	Guest Host	Radio Show and Podcast
2024	Dans la jardin	Guest (with Élodie Filleul)	Podcast

== Awards and nominations ==
=== Non-Eurovision related awards ===
Award	Year	Nominated work	Category	Result	Ref.
Grands Prix Sacem	2021	"Voilà"	Rolf Marbot Award	Won	
W9 D'or Award	2021	"Voilà"	Female Revelation of the Year	Won	
Victoires de la Musique	2022	Herself	Female Revelation of the Year	Won	
Prix Inter'val d'automne	2022	Herself	2022 Favourite	1st	

=== Eurovision related awards and success ===
Year	Name Of Award/Competition	Nominated work	Artist	Category (if any)	Result	Songwriters
2018	Eurovision France 2018	L'un près de l'autre	Noee	No category	Semi final: 5th	Barbara Pravi, Jules Jaconelli, Tomislav Matosin, Mélanie Di Petrantonio
2019	Junior Eurovision 2019	Bim Bam Toi	Carla Lazzari	No category	5th place	Barbara Pravi, Antoine Barrau
2020	TikTok Viral Song	Bim Bam Toi	Carla Lazzari	No category	Won	Barbara Pravi, Antoine Barrau
2020	Junior Eurovision 2020	J'imagine	Valentina Tronel	No category	Won	Barbara Pravi, Antoine Barrau
2021	Eurovision France, c'est vous qui décidez!	Voilà	Self	No category	Won	Barbara Pravi, Antoine Barrau, Lili Poe
2021	Marcel Bezençon Awards	Voilà	Self	Artistic Award	Won	Barbara Pravi, Antoine Barrau, Lili Poe
2021	Marcel Bezençon Awards	Voilà	Self	Press Award	Won	Barbara Pravi, Antoine Barrau, Lili Poe
2021	Eurovision 2021	Voilà	Self	No category	Second Place	Barbara Pravi, Antoine Barrau, Lili Poe
2022	Junior Eurovision 2022	Oh Maman!	Lissandro Formica	No category	Won	Barbara Pravi, Frederic Château

- She has stated that she has been asked to compete in Eurovision prior to Voilà but the song and year is unknown.

Preceded by Tom Leeb with "Mon alliée (The Best in Me)"	France in the Eurovision Song Contest; 2021	Succeeded by Alvan and Ahez with "Fulenn"
