= Fulenn =

2022 song by Alvan & Ahez

Single by Alvan and Ahez

from the album Magma
- Language: Breton
- English title: Spark / Pretty Girl
- Released: 18 February 2022
- Genre: Celtic electronica
- Length: 2:46
- Label: 10 Cordes; Swap
- Songwriters: Alvan, Ahez, Alexandra Redde-Amiel

Music video
- "Fulenn" on YouTube

Eurovision Song Contest 2022 entry
- Country: France
- Artists: Alvan and Ahez
- Language: Breton

Finals performance
- Final result: 24th
- Final points: 17

Entry chronology
- ◄ "Voilà" (2021)
- "Évidemment" (2023) ►

"Fulenn" (Breton: [ˈfyːlɛn]; transl. "Spark") is a song by French musician Alvan and the vocal group Ahez. It represented France in the Eurovision Song Contest 2022 in Turin, Italy, after winning Eurovision France, c'est vous qui décidez !, the French national final. It is the second time that France has selected a song sung in Breton, a Celtic language spoken in the region of Brittany, to represent the country at Eurovision, the first having occurred in 1996.

== Release ==
"Fulenn" was released on 16 February 2022, along with the other 11 competing songs in Eurovision France, c'est vous qui décidez !.

== Eurovision Song Contest ==
=== Eurovision France, c'est vous qui décidez ! ===
France 2 opened a submission period on 21 June 2021 in order for interested artists and songwriters to submit their proposals through an online submission form up until the deadline on 24 October 2021. Songs were required to contain at least 70% French language or French regional language lyrics with a free language allowance for the remaining lyrics. At the closing of the deadline, the French broadcaster received 3,000 submissions. Auditions which featured entries shortlisted from the received submissions took place starting on 6 January 2022 at the Apollo Theatre in Paris, and the twelve entries selected to compete in the national final were announced on 16 February 2022.

The final took place on 5 March 2022. Twelve entries would compete and the winner will be selected over two rounds of voting. In the first round, the top five entries as determined exclusively by public televoting would advance to the second round, the superfinal. An additional entry would be awarded the wildcard by a Francophone and international ten-member jury panel from the remaining seven entries to proceed to the superfinal. In the superfinal, the winner would be determined by the combination of public televoting and the ten-member jury. Immediately after the artists concluded their performances, a number was shown which denoted the number of jury members who liked the song, however, the results were symbolic and did not affect the voting.

"Fulenn" advanced being one of the top five in the first round. In the second round, "Fulenn" won with 222 points, from the juries and televotes combined, and become the French entry for the Eurovision Song Contest 2022.

=== At Eurovision ===
According to Eurovision rules, all nations with the exceptions of the host country and the "Big Five" (France, Germany, Italy, Spain and the United Kingdom) are required to qualify from one of two semi-finals in order to compete in the final; the top ten countries from each semi-final progress to the final. As a member of the "Big Five", France automatically qualifies to compete in the final on 14 May 2022. In addition to its participation in the final, France is also required to broadcast and vote in one of the two semi-finals. This was decided via a draw held during the semi-final allocation draw on 25 January 2022, when it was announced that France will be voting in the first semi-final.

== Charts ==
Chart performance for "Fulenn"
Chart (2022)	Peak position
Lithuania (AGATA)	22
Sweden Heatseeker (Sverigetopplistan)	18
