= Évidemment (La Zarra song) =

2023 song by La Zarra

Single by La Zarra
- Language: French
- Released: 19 February 2023
- Genre: Chanson; disco-house
- Length: 3:01
- Label: Universal
- Songwriters: Fatima Zahra Hafdi; Ahmed Saghir; Yannick Rastogi; Zacharie Raymond
- Producers: Banx & Ranx; Benny Adam

La Zarra singles chronology
"Sans moi" (2022)	"Évidemment" (2023)	"Évidemment (Duet Version)" (2023)

Music video
- "Évidemment" on YouTube

Eurovision Song Contest 2023 entry
- Country: France
- Artist: La Zarra
- Language: French
- Composers: Fatima Zahra Hafdi; Ahmed Saghir; Yannick Rastogi; Zacharie Raymond
- Lyricists: Fatima Zahra Hafdi; Ahmed Saghir

Finals performance
- Final result: 16th
- Final points: 104

Entry chronology
- ◄ "Fulenn" (2022)
- "Mon amour" (2024) ►

Official performance video
- "Évidemment" (Grand Final) on YouTube

"Évidemment" (French pronunciation: [evidamɑ̃]; transl. "Evidently") is a song by Canadian singer La Zarra, released on 19 February 2023. The song represented France in the Eurovision Song Contest 2023 after La Zarra was internally selected by France Télévisions, the French broadcaster for the Eurovision Song Contest.

== Eurovision Song Contest ==
=== Internal selection ===
On 13 January 2023, France Télévisions officially announced that the broadcaster had internally selected La Zarra to represent France in the Eurovision Song Contest 2023, with the song officially released on 19 February 2023. According to La Zarra, the song she had created was made specifically for the Eurovision Song Contest.

On 16 February, La Zarra officially announced that the title of her song for the contest was "Évidemment".

=== At Eurovision ===
According to Eurovision rules, all nations with the exceptions of the host country and the "Big Five" (France, Germany, Italy, Spain and the United Kingdom) are required to qualify from one of two semi-finals in order to compete in the final; the top ten countries from each semi-final progress to the final. As a member of the "Big Five", France automatically qualified to compete in the final on 13 May 2023. In addition to its participation in the final, France was also required to broadcast and vote in one of the two semi-finals. This was decided via a draw held during the semi-final allocation draw on 31 January 2023, when it was announced that France would be voting in the first semi-final.

== Duet version ==
"Évidemment (Duet Version)"

Single by La Zarra feat. Katerina Stikoudi
- Language: French; Greek
- Released: 23 June 2023
- Genre: Chanson; disco-house
- Length: 3:00
- Label: Universal
- Songwriters: Fatima Zahra Hafdi; Ahmed Saghir; Yannick Rastogi; Zacharie Raymond; Antonis Pappas
- Producer: Benny Adam

La Zarra singles chronology
"Évidemment" (2023)	"Évidemment (Duet Version)" (2023)	"Diva" (2025)

Katerina Stikoudi singles chronology
"Rockstar" (2023)	"Évidemment (Duet Version)" (2023)	"Have Yourself a Merry Little Christmas" (2023)

On 23 June 2023, a bilingual French-Greek duet version featuring Greek singer Katerina Stikoudi was released.

== Charts ==
Chart performance for "Évidemment"
Chart (2023)	Peak position
Canada Digital Song Sales (Billboard)	25
Finland (Suomen virallinen lista)	23
France (SNEP)	82
Germany Downloads (GfK Entertainment)	26
Greece International (IFPI)	10
Iceland (Tónlistinn)	13
Ireland (IRMA)	95
Lithuania (AGATA)	7
Netherlands (Single Tip)	14
Poland (Polish Streaming Top 100)	44
Portugal (AFP)	197
Quebec (ADISQ)	1
Sweden (Sverigetopplistan)	84
Switzerland (Schweizer Hitparade)	79
UK Singles (Official Charts)	94
