= Voilà (Barbara Pravi song) =

2021 song by Barbara Pravi

Single by Barbara Pravi

from the album On n'enferme pas les oiseaux
- Language: French
- English title: "There It Is"
- Written: September 2020
- Released: 6 November 2020
- Studio: Paris, France
- Genre: Chanson
- Length: 2:56
- Label: Capitol Music France; Universal Music Group
- Composers: Barbara Pravi; Antoine "Igit" Barrau
- Lyricists: Barbara Pravi; Lili Poe
- Producers: Barbara Pravi; Elodie Filleul; Jérémie Arcache

Barbara Pravi singles chronology
"La fin du monde" (2020)	"Voilà" (2020)	"Le jour se lève" (2021)

Music video
- "Voilà" on YouTube

Eurovision Song Contest 2021 entry
- Country: France
- Artist: Barbara Pravi
- Language: French
- Composers: Barbara Pravi; Antoine "Igit" Barrau
- Lyricists: Barbara Pravi; Lili Poe

Finals performance
- Final result: 2nd
- Final points: 499

Entry chronology
- ◄ "Mon alliée (The Best in Me)" (2020)
- "Fulenn" (2022) ►

"Voilà" is a song by French singer Barbara Pravi, who co-wrote the song with Igit and Lili Poe. It was released for digital download and to streaming platforms on 6 November 2020. The song represented France in the Eurovision Song Contest 2021 in Rotterdam, the Netherlands, placing second, after winning the pre-selection competition Eurovision France, c'est vous qui décidez! The single was certified Platinum (Global) in August 2021 and Gold (France) in April 2022. The song tells a personal story of Pravi's about self-acceptance.

== Eurovision Song Contest ==
The song represented France in the Eurovision Song Contest 2021, after it was chosen through Eurovision France, c'est vous qui décidez! She advanced from the first round. She went on to compete in the final, winning the jury and televote, amassing enough points to win the competition. As France is a member of the "Big Five", the song automatically advanced to the final, which was held on 22 May 2021 at the Rotterdam Ahoy in Rotterdam, Netherlands. In the final, the song placed second with 499 points, France's best result in the contest since 1991.

== Personnel ==
Credits adapted from Tidal.

- Barbara Pravi – producer, composer, lyricist, associated performer, vocals
- Elodie Filleul – producer
- Jérémie Arcache – producer
- Igit – composer
- Lili Poe – composer

== Charts ==
Chart performance for "Voilà"
Chart (2021)	Peak position
Austria (Ö3 Austria Top 40)	66
Belgium (Ultratop 50 Flanders)	26
Belgium (Ultratop 50 Wallonia)	34
Finland (Suomen virallinen lista)	10
France (SNEP)	24
Germany (GfK)	62
Global 200 (Billboard)	148
Greece (IFPI)	13
Hungary (Single Top 40)	35
Iceland (Tónlistinn)	19
Ireland (IRMA)	40
Lithuania (AGATA)	4
Netherlands (Single Top 100)	3
Norway (VG-lista)	19
Portugal (AFP)	50
Spain (PROMUSICAE)	60
Sweden (Sverigetopplistan)	18
Switzerland (Schweizer Hitparade)	24
UK Singles (Official Charts)	62

== Certifications ==
Certifications for "Voilà"
Region	Certification	Certified units/sales
France (SNEP)	Diamond	333,333^{‡}
Spain (Promusicae)	Gold	30,000^{‡}
^{‡} Sales+streaming figures based on certification alone.

== Release history ==
Release history for "Voilà"
Region	Date	Format	Label	Ref.
Various	6 November 2020	Digital download, streaming	Capitol Music France	

== Covers ==
Dutch singer Emma Kok won the inaugural season of Ministars with her cover of the song. Dutch violinist and conductor André Rieu was reportedly so impressed with Kok's performance that he invited her to perform "Voilà" at his annual concert series at the Vrijthof in July 2023. This performance soon went viral, and has amassed 122 million views as of November 2026. On Sep. 25 2025, Gina Levantal participated in an open mic session for the Youtube channel "Le Baladeur Open Mic" with a rendition.
