= Hooverphonic discography =

- Studio albums: 12
- Extended plays: 1
- Live albums: 3
- Compilation albums: 3
- Singles: 25

The discography of the Belgian band Hooverphonic includes twelve studio albums, three live albums, one EP, three compilation albums and many singles.

== Albums ==
=== Studio albums ===
Title	Details	Peak chart positions					Certifications
Title	Details	BEL (FL)	BEL (WA)	NLD	FRA	SWI	Certifications
A New Stereophonic Sound Spectacular (credited as Hoover)	Released: 29 July 1996; Label: Columbia; Format: Digital download, CD	17	32	—	—	—	
Blue Wonder Power Milk	Released: 11 August 1998; Label: Epic; Format: Digital download, CD	7	32	—	—	—	
The Magnificent Tree	Released: 26 September 2000; Label: Epic; Format: Digital download, CD	2	3	—	124	—	BEL: 2× Platinum
Hooverphonic Presents Jackie Cane	Released: 28 October 2002; Label: Columbia; Format: Digital download, CD	1	2	87	113	—	BEL: Platinum
No More Sweet Music/More Sweet Music	Released: 14 November 2005; Label: Sony Music; Format: Digital download, CD	2	6	—	—	99	BEL: Gold
The President of the LSD Golf Club	Released: 2007; Label: PIAS; Format: Digital download, CD	4	8	—	—	99	BEL: Gold
The Night Before	Released: 29 November 2010; Label: Sony Music; Format: Digital download, CD	2	9	34	—	—	BEL: Platinum
Reflection	Released: 15 November 2013; Label: Sony Music; Format: Digital download, CD	1	6	51	—	—	BEL: Platinum
In Wonderland	Released: 11 March 2016; Label: Sony Music; Format: Digital download, CD, streaming	1	2	26	—	—	BEL: Gold
Looking for Stars	Released: 16 November 2018; Label: Universal Music; Format: Digital download, CD, streaming	4	20	74	—	—	BEL: Gold
Hidden Stories	Released: 7 May 2021; Label: Universal Music; Format: Digital download, CD, streaming	1	2	26	—	—	
Fake Is the New Dope	Released: 24 March 2024; Label: Sony Music; Format: Digital download, CD, streaming	4	17	—	—	—	
"—" denotes a recording that did not chart or was not released in that territory.

=== Live albums ===
Title	Details	Peak chart positions		
Title	Details	BEL (FL)	BEL (WA)	SWI
Sit Down and Listen to Hooverphonic	Released: 16 December 2003; Label: Columbia Records; Format: Digital download, CD, DVD	4	12	93
Hooverphonic with Orchestra Live	Released: 26 October 2012; Label: Columbia Records; Format: Digital download, CD, DVD	1	11	—
The Magnificent Tree: Live with Strings	Released: 26 September 2025; Label: Columbia Records; Format: Digital download, CD	9	32	—
"—" denotes a recording that did not chart or was not released in that territory.

=== Compilation albums ===
Title	Details	Peak chart positions		
Title	Details	BEL	BEL (WA)	NLD
Singles '96–'06	Released: 21 November 2006; Label: Sony BMG; Format: Digital download, CD	8	22	—
Hooverphonic with Orchestra	Released: 23 March 2012; Label: Columbia Records; Format: Digital download, CD	1	5	69
The Best of Hooverphonic	Released: 21 October 2016; Label: Sony Music; Format: Digital download, CD	3	6	—
"—" denotes a recording that did not chart or was not released in that territory.

== Extended plays ==
Title	Details
Battersea	Released: 1998; Label: Epic; Format: Digital download

== Singles ==
=== As lead artist ===
Title	Year	Peak chart positions							Album
Title	Year	BEL (FL)	BEL (WA)	NLD	FRA	ITA	SWE Heat.	UK	Album
"2Wicky"	1996	—	—	—	—	—	—	90	A New Stereophonic Sound Spectacular
"Wardrope"	1996	—	—	—	—	—	—	—	A New Stereophonic Sound Spectacular
"Inhaler"	1996	—	—	—	—	—	—	—	A New Stereophonic Sound Spectacular
"Barabas"	1996	—	—	—	—	—	—	—	A New Stereophonic Sound Spectacular
"Club Montepulciano"	1998	—	—	—	—	—	—	—	Blue Wonder Power Milk
"Eden"	1998	62	12	—	—	—	—	—	Blue Wonder Power Milk
"This Strange Effect"	1998	—	—	—	—	—	—	—	Blue Wonder Power Milk
"Lung" (remix)	1998	—	—	—	—	—	—	—	Blue Wonder Power Milk
"Mad About You"	2000	23	35	83	39	8	—	104	The Magnificent Tree
"Vinegar & Salt"	2000	56	53	—	—	—	—	—	The Magnificent Tree
"Out of Sight (Best Friends)"	2001	61	60	—	—	32	—	—	The Magnificent Tree
"Jackie Cane"	2001	53	58	100	—	—	—	—	The Magnificent Tree
"The World Is Mine"	2002	48	54	—	—	45	—	—	Hooverphonic Presents Jackie Cane
"Sometimes"	2002	36	52	69	—	—	—	—	Hooverphonic Presents Jackie Cane
"One"	2003	61	67	—	—	—	—	—	Hooverphonic Presents Jackie Cane
"The Last Thing I Need Is You"	2003	52	62	—	—	—	—	—	Sit Down and Listen to Hooverphonic
"Wake Up"	2005	52	56	—	—	—	—	—	No More Sweet Music
"You Hurt Me"	2006	44	54	—	—	—	—	—	No More Sweet Music
"Dirty Lenses" (remix)	2006	61	56	—	—	—	—	—	No More Sweet Music
"We All Float"	2006	—	—	—	—	—	—	—	No More Sweet Music
"Expedition Impossible"	2007	30	54	—	—	—	—	—	The President of the LSD Golf Club
"Gentle Storm"	2007	54	67	—	—	—	—	—	The President of the LSD Golf Club
"Circles"	2008	73	—	—	—	—	—	—	The President of the LSD Golf Club
"50 Watt"	2008	—	—	—	—	—	—		The President of the LSD Golf Club
"The Night Before"	2010	3	5	97	—	—	—	—	The Night Before
"Anger Never Dies"	2011	5	22	—	—	15	—	—	The Night Before
"One Two Three"	2011	48	56	—	—	26	—	—	The Night Before
"Heartbroken"	2011	55	65	—	—	—	—	—	The Night Before
"Happiness"	2012	40	54	—	—	—	—	—	Hooverphonic with Orchestra
"Unfinished Sympathy"	2012	27	58	—	—	—	—	—	Hooverphonic with Orchestra
"Renaissance Affair" (2012)	2012	58	69	—	—	—	—	—	Hooverphonic with Orchestra
"George's Café"	2012	80	—	—	—	—	—	—	Hooverphonic with Orchestra
"Amalfi"	2013	4	5	—	—	—	—	—	Reflection
"Ether"	2014	54	52	—	—	—	—	—	Reflection
"Boomerang"	2014	56	70	—	—	—	—	—	Reflection
"ABC of Apology"	2014	—	—	—	—	—	—	—	Reflection
"Gravity"	2014	54	77	—	—	—	—	—	Reflection
"Badaboum" (featuring Émilie Satt and Litlo Tinz)	2015	3	7	—	—	—	—	—	In Wonderland
"I Like the Way I Dance"	2016	23	36	—	—	—	—	—	In Wonderland
"Hiding in a Song"	2016	35	67	—	—	—	—	—	In Wonderland
"You"	2016	26	55	—	—	—	—	—	In Wonderland
"Romantic"	2018	14	19	—	—	—	—	—	Looking for Stars
"Uptight"	2018	17	21	—	—	—	—	—	Looking for Stars
"Looking for Stars"	2019	35	62	—	—	—	—	—	Looking for Stars
"Horrible Person"	2019	52	79	—	—	—	—	—	Looking for Stars
"Release Me"	2020	21	61	—	—	—	—	—	Non-album singles
"Summer Sun"	2020	39	51	—	—	—	—	—	Non-album singles
"Mad About You" (2020)	2020	50	73	—	—	—	—	—	Non-album singles
"The Wrong Place"	2021	1	27	89	—	—	1	— (Note: "The Wrong Place" did not enter the UK Singles Chart, but peaked at number 77 on the UK Singles Downloads Chart.)	Hidden Stories
"Thinking About You"	2021	44	—	—	—	—	—	—	Hidden Stories
"Lift Me Up"	2021	44	—	—	—	—	—	—	Hidden Stories
"Belgium in the Rain"	2022	—	—	—	—	—	—	—	Hidden Stories
"Mysterious"	2022	—	—	—	—	—	—	—	Non-album single
"—" denotes a recording that did not chart or was not released in that territory.

=== As featured artist ===
Year	Title	Peak chart positions	Album
Year	Title	BEL	Album
2009	"Mijn leven" (Andy Sierens a.k.a. Vijvenveertig featuring Hooverphonic)	1	Ne stap verder

== Miscellaneous contributions ==
=== Tributes ===
Year	Title	Original artist	Album
1998	"Shake the Disease"	Depeche Mode	For the Masses: An Album of Depeche Mode Songs
2008	"In Bloom"	Nirvana	Rendez Vous — 25 Unieke Covers Uit 25 Jaar Studio Brussel

=== Soundtracks ===
Year	Title	Film
1996	"2 Wicky" (as Hoover)	Stealing Beauty
1997	"2 Wicky"	I Know What You Did Last Summer
1998	"Eden"	I Still Know What You Did Last Summer
1998	"2 Wicky"	Permanent Midnight
1999	"Shades	Shades (film)
2002	"Inhaler"	CSI: Crime Scene Investigation
