= Reflection (Hooverphonic album) =

Studio album by Hooverphonic
- Released: November 15, 2013
- Genre: Pop rock
- Length: 40:58
- Label: Columbia; Sony
- Producer: Alex Callier

Hooverphonic chronology
Hooverphonic with Orchestra Live (2012)	Reflection (2013)	In Wonderland (2016)

Singles from Reflection
- 1. "Amalfi" Released: 2013; 2. "Ether" Released: 2014; 3. "Boomerang" Released: 2014; 4. "ABC of Apology" Released: 2014; 5. "Gravity" Released: 2014

Reflection is the eighth studio album by Belgian band Hooverphonic. It was released on 15 November 2013 via Columbia Records/Sony Music. Recording sessions took place at private homes in Gentbrugge, Rachecourt-Suzémont, Boom, Hasselt & Hoeselt. It spawned five singles: "Amalfi", "Ether", "Boomerang", "ABC of Apology" and "Gravity".

The album peaked at number-one on the Ultratop 200 Albums in the Flanders region, at number six in Wallonia, and was certified Platinum by Belgian Entertainment Association on 24 January 2014.

== Track listing ==
Reflection track listing
No.	Title	Writer(s)	Length
1.	"Amalfi"	Alex Callier; Luca Chiaravalli	3:17
2.	"ABC of Apology"	Callier	3:01
3.	"Ether"	Callier	2:51
4.	"Radio Silence"	Callier; Chiaravalli; Lara Pagin	3:06
5.	"Bad Weather"	Callier	2:22
6.	"Boomerang"	Callier; Raymond Geerts	2:12
7.	"Devil Kind of Girl"	Callier	2:42
8.	"Single Malt"	Callier; Geerts	2:29
9.	"Plasticine"	Callier	3:06
10.	"Gravity"	Callier; Laura Groeseneken	3:06
11.	"Wait for a While"	Callier; Chiaravalli	2:43
12.	"Roadblock"	Callier; Noémie Wolfs	2:30
13.	"Copper (Cu)"	Callier; Wolfs	2:48
14.	"Erased"	Callier	2:07
15.	"Clouds"	Callier	2:42
Total length:			40:58

== Personnel ==
- Noémie Wolfs – lead vocals
- Raymond Geerts – guitar (tracks: 2, 3, 6–10, 12, 13, 15), electric guitar (track 4), acoustic guitar (track 11)
- Alex Callier – bass guitar (tracks: 1–4, 6, 8–13, 15), glockenspiel (track 9), toy harmonium (track 11), percussion and additional synth (track 12), mellotron (track 13), engineering, producer
- Yassin Joris – backing vocals (tracks: 1, 2, 4, 5, 7–13, 15)
- Tom Tritsmans – backing vocals (tracks: 1, 2, 4, 5, 7–13, 15)
- Joey Brocken – backing vocals (tracks: 1, 2, 4, 5, 7–13, 15)
- Gianluigi Fazio – vocoded vocals (track 11)
- Luca Chiaravalli – acoustic guitar (tracks: 1, 4), electric guitar (tracks: 4, 11), additional keyboards (track 11)
- Marco Trentacoste – electric guitar (track 1)
- Remko Kühne – piano (tracks: 1, 3–5, 7, 10, 11, 14, 15), mellotron (tracks: 2, 4, 8–10), Farfisa electric organ (tracks: 4, 12), clavinet (track 4), Hammond electric organ (track 6), electric piano (track 9)
- Peter Claes – piano (track 6), percussion (track 8), engineering
- Lennart Dauphin – electric upright bass (track 7)
- Arnout Hellofs – drums (tracks: 1–4, 6–13, 15), tambourine (track 15)
- Door Raeymaeckers – percussion (tracks: 1, 2, 6, 8, 15)
- Ronald Prent – mixing
- Greg Calbi – mastering

== Charts ==
=== Weekly charts ===
Chart (2013)	Peak position
Belgian Albums (Ultratop Flanders)	1
Belgian Albums (Ultratop Wallonia)	6
Dutch Albums (Album Top 100)	51

=== Year-end charts ===
Chart (2013)	Position
Belgian Albums (Ultratop Flanders)	34
Belgian Albums (Ultratop Wallonia)	60

Chart (2014)	Position
Belgian Albums (Ultratop Flanders)	23
Belgian Albums (Ultratop Wallonia)	23

== Certifications ==
Region	Certification	Certified units/sales
Belgium (BRMA)	Platinum	30,000^{*}
^{*} Sales figures based on certification alone.

== See also ==
- List of number-one albums of 2013 (Belgium)
