= Belgium in the Eurovision Song Contest 2020 =

- Eurovision Song Contest 2020
- Participating broadcaster: Vlaamse Radio- en Televisieomroeporganisatie (VRT)
- Country: Belgium
- Selection process: Internal selection
- Announcement date: Artist: 1 October 2019; Song: 17 February 2020

Competing entry
- Song: "Release Me"
- Artist: Hooverphonic
- Songwriters: Alex Callier; Luca Chiaravalli

Placement
- Final result: Contest cancelled

Participation chronology

Belgium was set to be represented at the Eurovision Song Contest 2020 with the song "Release Me", written by Alex Callier and Luca Chiaravalli, and performed by the band Hooverphonic. The Belgian participating broadcaster, Flemish Vlaamse Radio- en Televisieomroeporganisatie (VRT), internally selected its entry for the contest. The band was announced on 1 October 2019, and the song, "Release Me", was presented to the public on 17 February 2020.

Belgium was drawn to compete in the first semi-final of the Eurovision Song Contest which would have taken place on 12 May 2020. However, the contest was cancelled due to the COVID-19 pandemic.

== Background ==
Prior to the 2020 contest, Belgium had participated in the Eurovision Song Contest sixty-one times since its debut as one of seven countries to take part in 1956. Since then, the country has won the contest on one occasion in 1986 with the song "J'aime la vie" performed by Sandra Kim. Following the introduction of semi-finals for 2004, Belgium had been featured in only six finals. In 2019, "Wake Up" by Eliot placed thirteenth in the first semi-final and failing to advance to the final.

The Belgian participation in the contest alternates between two broadcasters: Flemish Vlaamse Radio- en Televisieomroeporganisatie (VRT) and Walloon Radio-télévision belge de la Communauté française (RTBF) at the time, with both broadcasters sharing the broadcasting rights. Both broadcasters –and their predecessors– have selected the Belgian entry using national finals and internal selections in the past. In 2018 and 2019, both VRT and RTBF internally selected the Belgian entry. On 24 May 2019, VRT confirmed its participation in the 2020 contest and continued the internal selection procedure.

== Before Eurovision ==
=== Internal selection ===
VRT internally selected its entry for the Eurovision Song Contest 2020. On 7 September 2019, the broadcaster's general music coordinator Gerrit Kerremans revealed that the artist would be selected by an A&R Team (Arts and Repertoire) consisting of music experts and that several acts were being considered. On 1 October 2019, the broadcaster announced that the band Hooverphonic would represent Belgium in Rotterdam. The song the band would perform at the contest, "Release Me", was presented to the public on 17 February 2020 during the radio MNM programme De Grote Peter Van de Veire Ochtendshow. The song was written by member of Hooverphonic, Alex Callier, along with Luca Chiaravalli. The music video for the song, directed by Matthias Lebeer, was released on the same day of the presentation.

== At Eurovision ==
According to Eurovision rules, all nations with the exceptions of the host country and the "Big Five" (France, Germany, Italy, Spain and the United Kingdom) are required to qualify from one of two semi-finals in order to compete for the final; the top ten countries from each semi-final progress to the final. The European Broadcasting Union (EBU) split up the competing countries into six different pots based on voting patterns from previous contests, with countries with favourable voting histories put into the same pot. On 28 January 2020, a special allocation draw was held which placed each country into one of the two semi-finals, as well as which half of the show they would perform in. Belgium was placed into the first semi-final, to be held on 12 May 2020, and was scheduled to perform in the second half of the show. However, due to the COVID-19 pandemic, the contest was cancelled.

Prior to the Eurovision Song Celebration YouTube broadcast in place of the semi-finals, it was revealed that Belgium was set to perform in position 9, before the entry from Russia and after the entry from Malta.
