= Sennek =

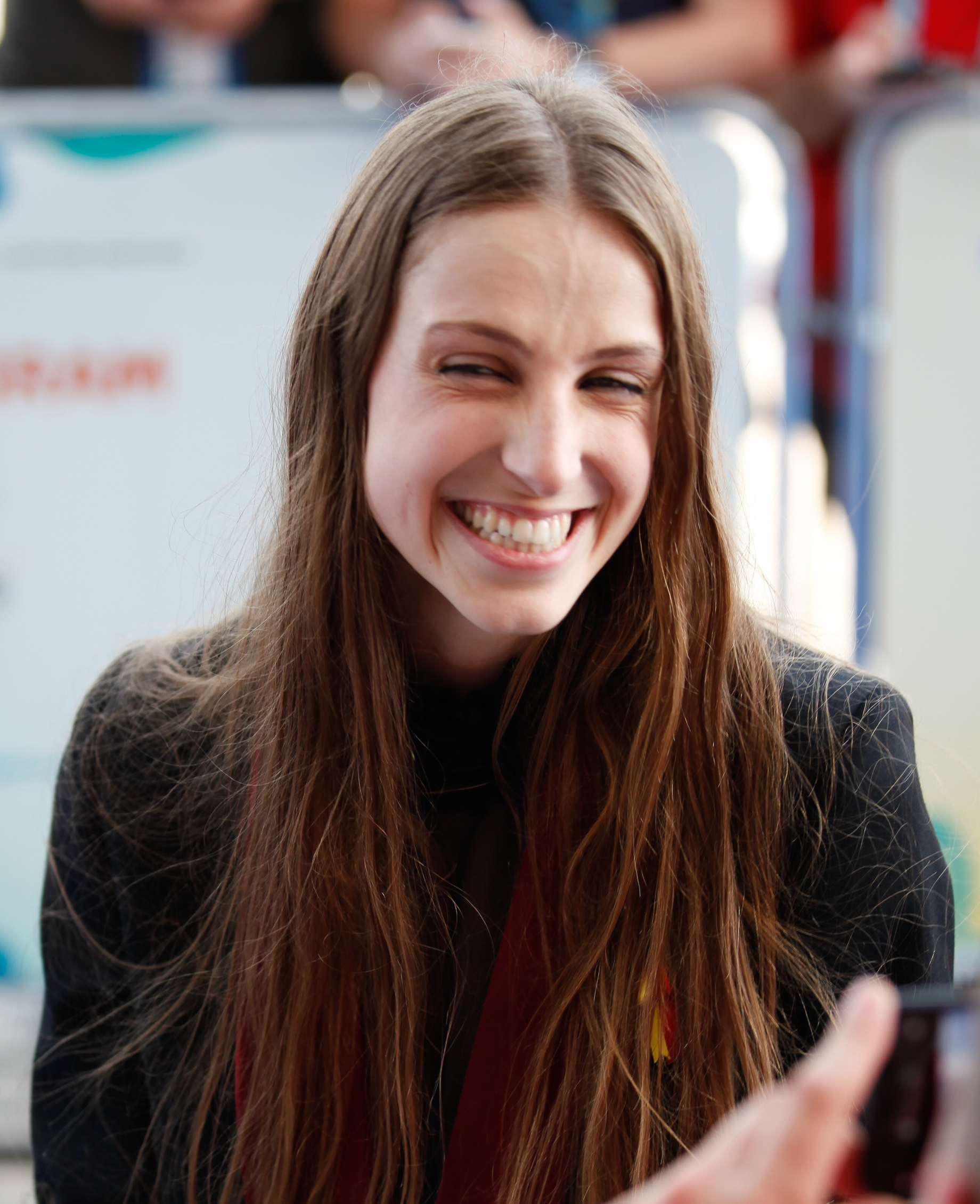
- Groeseneken in 2018

Background information
- Also known as: Sennek, Lola
- Born: Laura Groeseneken; 30 April 1990 (age 36); Leuven, Belgium
- Genres: Soul, electronica; pop; Rock
- Occupations: Singer; songwriter
- Instruments: Vocals; piano
- Years active: 2014–present

Laura Groeseneken (born 30 April 1990), also known as Sennek, is a Belgian singer and songwriter. She represented Belgium in the Eurovision Song Contest 2018 with the song "A Matter of Time", but did not make it to the final.

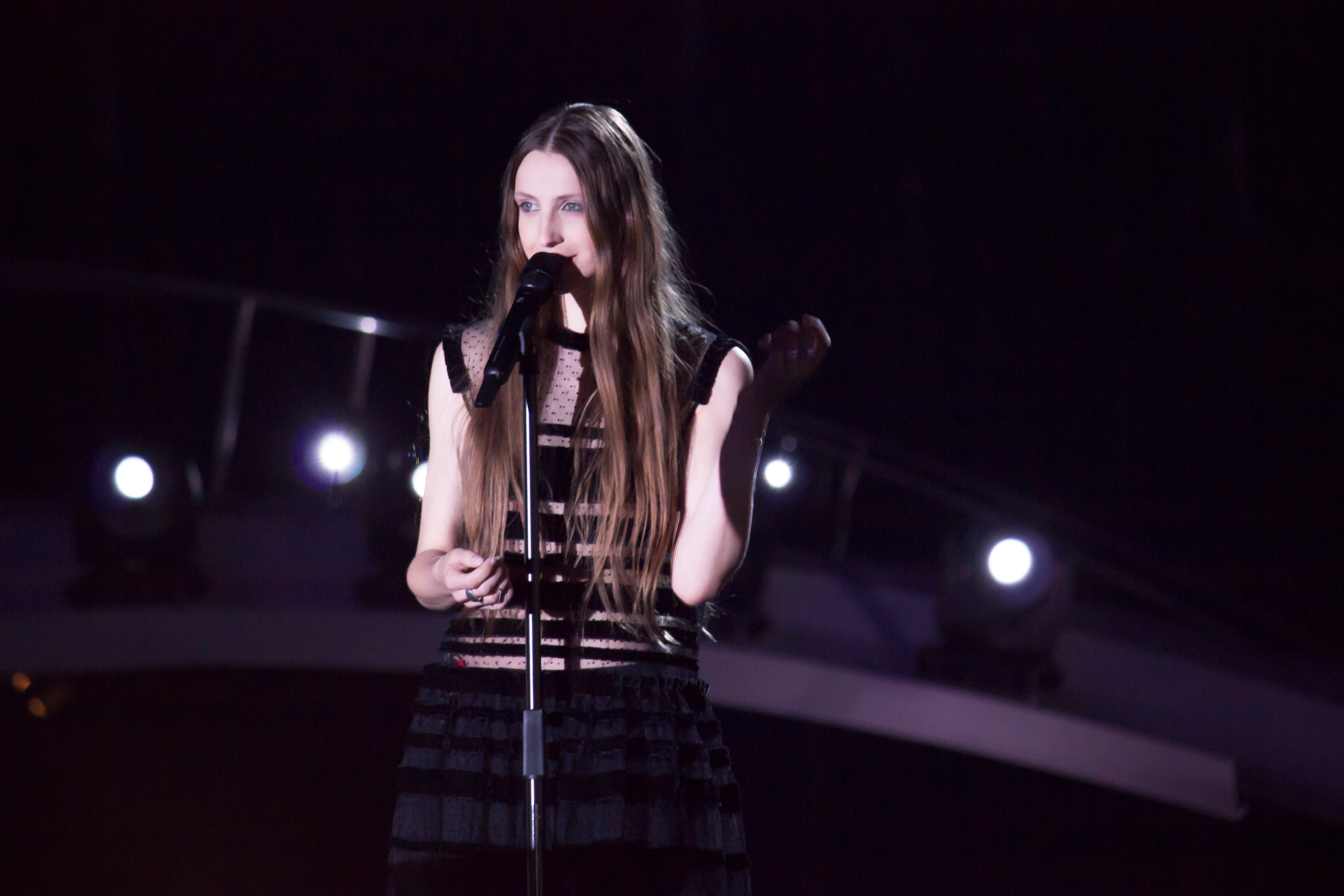
Sennek performing at the Eurovision Song Contest 2018

Groeseneken has performed as the keyboardist for Belgian musician Ozark Henry, performing with him at Rock Werchter. She worked as a visual merchandiser for IKEA, while also working as a vocal coach in her hometown. Groeseneken has written music for the Belgian pop-rock band Hooverphonic with Alex Callier.

== Singles ==
Title	Year	Peak chart positions		Certifications	Album
Title	Year	BEL (FL)	BEL (WA) Tip	Certifications	Album
"A Matter of Time"	2018	9	16		TBA
"Endlessly"	2019	—	—		TBA
"Overtones"	2021	—	—		TBA
"Kaleidoscope" (Live)	2021	—	—		TBA
"Butterfly" (Live)	2021	—	—		TBA
"Rise Like a Phoenix"	2023	—	—		Eurovision Unplugged EP
"Gelukkig zijn"	2023	—	—		Eurovision Unplugged EP
"Just a Little Bit (Ooh Aah)"	2023	—	—		Eurovision Unplugged EP
"Ding a Dong"	2023	—	—		Eurovision Unplugged EP
"—" denotes a single that did not chart or was not released.

== Extended plays ==
- Eurovision Unplugged (2023)

Preceded by Blanche with "City Lights"	Belgium in the Eurovision Song Contest; 2018	Succeeded by Eliot with Wake Up
