= The President of the LSD Golf Club =

Studio album by Hooverphonic
- Released: 2007
- Recorded: 2007
- Genre: Trip hop; electronic; dream pop; rock; psychedelic
- Length: 41:18
- Label: Play It Again Sam
- Producer: Alex Callier

Hooverphonic chronology
Singles '96–'06 (2006)	The President of the LSD Golf Club (2007)	The Night Before (2010)

Professional ratings
Review scores
Source	Rating
AllMusic	4.5/5 stars
HUMO	3/4 stars

The President of the LSD Golf Club is the sixth studio album by the Belgian band Hooverphonic. The title was originally intended for The Magnificent Tree, but was not allowed by Sony, Hooverphonic's label at the time.

The album has quite a different feel from previous Hooverphonic albums. The album was recorded with live musicians and made use of the mellotron, an electronic keyboard popularised by The Beatles' "Strawberry Fields Forever". The sound of the album harks back to the psychedelic era of music but retains a sense of modernity. Songs such as "Expedition Impossible" also have more of a traditional rock sound, compared to the sound of earlier Hooverphonic work.

Critics were divided on the album, some claiming it grounded Hooverphonic after the mystery of The Magnificent Tree, while others claimed that it was the most "daring and experimental Hooverphonic album" yet.

In some countries (like France, Italy, Sweden and Spain), and on iTunes, the album received a special edition release which included "The Perfect Dose".

== Singles ==
The first single from the album was "Expedition Impossible" with the B-sides "Pink Flamingo Dream" and "August". It was released in September 2007 in the Netherlands and Belgium and January 2008 worldwide. It was also the first Hooverphonic single to get an international release on iTunes. In 2012, the song was re-recorded with vocals by Noémie Wolfs for inclusion on the orchestral album With Orchestra. It is also the only song from The President of the LSD Golf Club to feature on The Best of Hooverphonic compilation in 2016.

The second single was announced in late October 2007 as "Gentle Storm". The B-side to the single, "The Perfect Dose", was also released on iTunes as a download single and on the special edition of the album in select countries.

The third single "Circles" was released in February 2008. The song was remixed for the single release and included the b-side "Cry", a cover of a song by Godley & Creme, released in 1985.

The song "50 Watt" was released as a radio-only single in Belgium in early 2008 along with a cover of Nirvana's "In Bloom".

Charts

Year	Title	BE
2007	"Expedition Impossible"	30
2007	"Gentle Storm"	—
2008	"Circles"	—
2008	"50 Watt"	—

== Track listing ==
All songs written by Alex Callier

1. "Stranger" – 4:37
2. "50 Watt" – 4:47
3. "Expedition Impossible" – 4:07
4. "Circles" – 4:17
5. "Gentle Storm" – 3:01
6. "The Eclipse Song" – 3:01
7. "Billie" – 3:37
8. "Black Marble Tiles" – 5:33
9. "Strictly Out of Phase" – 3:21
10. "Bohemian Laughter" – 5:02
11. "The Perfect Dose" (Special Edition only) – 2:59

B-sides and covers:

1. "Pink Flamingo Dream" – 5:40
2. "August" – 3:20
3. "The Perfect Dose" – 2:57
4. "Cry" – 3:36
5. "In Bloom" – 3:29

== Chart performance ==
=== Weekly charts ===
Chart (2007–08)	Peak position
Belgian Albums (Ultratop Flanders)	4
Belgian Albums (Ultratop Wallonia)	8
Swiss Albums (Schweizer Hitparade)	99

=== Year-end charts ===
Chart (2007)	Position
Belgian Albums (Ultratop Flanders)	62
Chart (2008)	Position
Belgian Albums (Ultratop Flanders)	82

== Personnel ==
- Geike Arnaert – vocals
- Alex Callier – bass, vocals
- Raymond Geerts – guitars
- Steven Van Havere – drums, percussion
- Remko Kühne – upright piano, farfisa, harpsichord, Hohner pianet, rhodes
- Cédric Murrath – mellotron, treated piano, moog, backing vocals

== Certifications ==
Region	Certification	Certified units/sales
Belgium (BRMA)	Gold	15,000^{*}
^{*} Sales figures based on certification alone.
