= No More Sweet Music =

Studio album by Hooverphonic
- Released: 14 November 2005
- Genres: Trip hop; electronic; dream pop
- Length: 40:57; 42:05 (remixes)
- Label: Sony
- Producer: Alex Callier

Hooverphonic chronology
Sit Down and Listen to Hooverphonic (2003)	No More Sweet Music (2005)	Singles '96–'06 (2006)

No More Sweet Music is a double album by the Belgian band Hooverphonic. It is the group's fifth studio album, and was released in 2005. The first disc is titled More Sweet Music and contains 11 songs performed in the familiar Hooverphonic style, whilst the second disc contains the very same 11 songs in their remixed versions by Hooverphonic's main composer and programmer Alex Callier, and is titled NO More Sweet Music, a title indicative of the nature of the remixed versions, which also underlines the notable difference in style between the two discs. The singles released from this album are "You Hurt Me", "Wake Up", "Dirty Lenses" and "We All Float".

The title track "No More Sweet Music" contains samples from the Henry Mancini penned "Lujon" from the album "Mr. Lucky Goes Latin".

A 2 disc Dual Disc version was also released later in 2005. The DVD sides contain all tracks in Dolby Surround 5.1 as well as (not indicated on the disc's cover) DTS 5.1, plus two documentaries ("making of" and interviews with Hooverphonic members) and the music videos of "Wake Up", and "You Hurt Me" (both original and remix versions).

Callier composed 40 tracks for No More Sweet Music. The 11 selected were not necessarily the best but were selected because they worked well together.

Some of the remaining tracks were used in their 2007 album, The President of the LSD Golf Club.

== Track listing ==
Disc 1

1. "You Love Me to Death" (Arnaert, Callier)
2. "We All Float" (Callier)
3. "Music Box" (Arnaert, Callier)
4. "You Hurt Me" (Callier)
5. "No More Sweet Music" (Arnaert, Callier, Henry Mancini)
6. "Tomorrow" (Callier, Eumir Deodato)
7. "Dirty Lenses" (Callier, Felix Howard)
8. "Heartbeat" (Callier)
9. "Wake Up" (Callier)
10. "My Child" (Callier)
11. "Ginger" (Callier)

Disc 2 contains each track on Disc 1 in the same order remixed by Alex Callier.

== Dual disc edition ==
CD sides contain the same as the normal CD version.

DVD side:

Disc 1

- 5.1 Surround version of all tracks on disc 1 (Dolby Digital and DTS)
- Making of documentary
- Interviews with Hooverphonic

Disc 2

- 5.1 Surround version of all tracks on disc 2 (Dolby Digital and DTS)
- Video clips for "Wake Up" (original and remix)
- Video clips for "You Hurt Me" (original and remix)

== Personnel ==
- Geike Arnaert – lead vocals
- Raymond Geerts – guitar
- Alex Callier – programming, bass, backing vocals
- Mario Goossens – drums & percussion
- David Poltrock – keyboards & piano
- Dan Lacksman – additional analogue synth programming
- Vlad Weverbergen – clarinet
- Ferenc Pal – cimbalon
- Xu Wen Gao – erhu
- Kristoffel de Laat – upright bass
- Pascal Moreau – french horn
- Jean-Pierre Dassonville – french horn
- Etienne Maillé – french horn
- David Lefevre – french horn
- Cédric Murrath – violin
- Yumica Lecluyze – violin
- Marc Pijpops – viola
- Hans Vandaele – cello
- Daan Stuyven – vocal on "Ginger"

== Charts ==
=== Weekly charts ===
Chart (2005–2006)	Peak position
Belgian Albums (Ultratop Flanders)	2
Belgian Albums (Ultratop Wallonia)	6
Swiss Albums (Schweizer Hitparade)	99

=== Year-end charts ===
Chart (2005)	Position
Belgian Albums (Ultratop Flanders)	17
Belgian Albums (Ultratop Wallonia)	53

== Singles ==
Of the four songs released as singles, "You Hurt Me" charted at #44.

Year	Title	BE
2005	"Wake Up"	—
2005	"You Hurt Me"	44
2005	"We All Float"	—
2006	"Dirty Lenses"	—

== Certifications ==
Region	Certification	Certified units/sales
Belgium (BRMA)	Gold	25,000^{*}
^{*} Sales figures based on certification alone.
