= Battersea (disambiguation) =

Battersea is a district of the city of London. It may also refer to:

- Battersea (UK Parliament constituency)
- Battersea (London County Council constituency)
- Metropolitan Borough of Battersea, a civil parish and borough of the County of London
- Battersea Power Station, a decommissioned power generation station in London
- Battersea, Ontario, Canada, a community
- Battersea (Prairieville, Alabama), a plantation house on the National Register of Historic Places
- Battersea (Petersburg, Virginia), a historic house
- Battersea (EP), by the Belgian band Hooverphonic
- Battersea Dogs & Cats Home, a rescue center for dogs and cats
