= Expedition Impossible =

Expedition Impossible may refer to:

- "Expedition Impossible" (song), a song by the Belgian group Hooverphonic
- Expedition Impossible (TV series), a 2011 American reality television series
