= Lujon =

1961 song by Henry Mancini

Song
- Released: 1961
- Genre: Easy listening
- Length: 3:17:00
- Label: RCA Victor
- Songwriter: Henry Mancini

"Lujon" (also known as "Slow Hot Wind") is a composition by Henry Mancini.

== Background ==
Its name comes from the lujon percussion instrument heard on the recording.

== Henry Mancini recording ==
It appeared on his 1961 album Mr. Lucky Goes Latin, but was an original piece of music that had nothing to do with the Mr. Lucky television program. It was included in the soundtracks for the films The Big Lebowski, Sexy Beast, W.E., and Two Lovers. Mancini would later record a jazz/swing version of "Slow Hot Wind" and include it on his 1975 album Symphonic Soul. The song reached No. 38 on the Adult Contemporary chart in 1976.

== Other versions ==
- With lyrics by Norman Gimbel, titled as "Slow Hot Wind" (or "A Slow Hot Wind"), the song was recorded by Johnny Hartman (1964 album The Voice That Is!), Sarah Vaughan (1965 album Sarah Vaughan Sings the Mancini Songbook), Sérgio Mendes & Brazil '66 (1966 album Herb Alpert Presents), Roseanna Vitro (1991 album Reaching for the Moon), Julee Cruise (2002 album The Art of Being a Girl), and others.
- The song was remixed as "Ocean Beach" by Black Mighty Orchestra on the compilation album Chilled 1991–2008.
- "Lujon" is featured in the 1996 album Sacrebleu by Dimitri from Paris, Track 19, renamed "Epilogue".
- Belgian trip hop band Hooverphonic recorded a version of the song overlaid with vocals, "No More Sweet Music". from the 2005 eponymous album.
- "Lujon" was recorded by Les Deux Love Orchestra and appears on the album King Kong (2008), featuring members of Mancini's original orchestra.
- "Lujon" is sampled in South Korean girl group Red Velvet's song "Orchestra" on their 2026 EP Velvet Summer.
- "Lujon" is sampled in the song Tourbillon de l'ombre by Jace Ellery and appears in many TikTok videos
