= Marco Trentacoste =

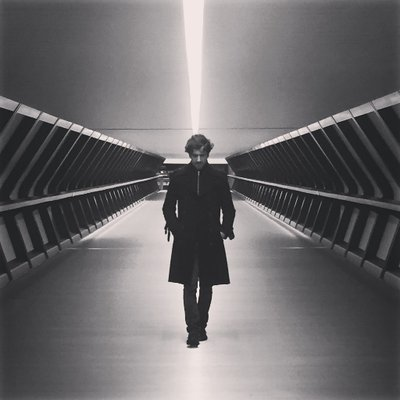
- Marco Trentacoste in 2016

Background information
- Born: 4 August 1976 (age 49); Milan, Lombardy, Italy
- Genres: Alternative rock, industrial, electronic
- Occupations: Musician; Producer; Mixer
- Instruments: Guitar, keyboards
- Years active: 1993–present
- Labels: Edel Records, Sony Music
- Website: marcotrentacoste.com

Marco Trentacoste is a London-based music producer, guitarist and mixer engineer who has been active since 1993.

== Career ==
Trentacoste grew up in Milan.

In 1993, Trentacoste founded the band, V.M.18, and released their eponymous album in 1996. Following V.M.18's split in 1997, Trentacoste played with The Paolo Martella Band (1997–1999) and Delta V (1998–2001). During this period, Trentacoste also remixed songs for various artists including Bluvertigo, Soerba (under the name 'Clockwork') and Pino Scotto.

From 2001 to 2008, Trentacoste was a member of Deasonika and also produced four of their albums ('L'Uomo Del Secolo' (2001), 'Piccoli Dettagli Al Buio' (2004), 'Deasonika' (2006), 'Tredicipose' (2008)). Deasonika participated in the 56th Sanremo Festival in 2006 with the song,'Non Dimentico Piu'.

From 2006, Trentacoste started working with Le Vibrazioni and produced their gold album, 'Officine Meccaniche' (2006). Trentacoste went on to produce and mix Le Vibrazioni's album and DVD of live performances, 'En Vivo' (2007) – which included the successful single 'Insolita' (featured in the movie, 'Colpo D'Occhio' starring Riccardo Scamarcio) – and also produced and mixed Le Vibrazioni's fourth album, 'Le Strade Del Tempo' (2010).

Between 2008 and 2012, Trentacoste produced, mixed and played with a number of artists in Italy including Lacuna Coil (as mixer of the live DVD, 'Visual Karma'), Giusy Ferreri (as producer and mixer-engineer for the album,'Il Mio Universo') and Eros Ramazzotti (as sound engineer for the multi platinum album, 'Noi').

Since 2013, Trentacoste has focussed predominantly on international projects such as music for the 'Lawless' movie trailer and The Dyneema Project and working with Hooverphonic (as guitarist on the single, 'Amalfi') and Dope Stars Inc. (as remixer and producer of the song, 'Along With You').

In 2016, Trentacoste worked with KMFDM mixing the anthology album 'Rocks: Milestones Reloaded' and remixing two of their songs, 'Amnesia' and 'A Drug Against War'.

In 2017, Trentacoste started working with the Chinese rock artist, Xie Tian Xiao (谢天笑), producing and mixing the album 'That's Not Me' (那不是我). For this work, Trentacoste was nominated for a 'Golden Melody Award' for 'Best Vocal Recording Album'.

In 2018, Xie Tian Xiao (谢天笑) won the Golden Melody Award for 'Best Chinese Rock Artist 2018' with the album 'That's not me' (那不是我) produced, recorded and mixed by Trentacoste.

In 2020, Marco Trentacoste released his first solo instrumental album, "Consequence".

== Other ==
In 2003, Trentacoste produced and mixed an album for Marco Cocci's band, Malfunk.

Between 2004 and 2007, Trentacoste was a member of the Rezophonic project.

Deasonika's 2006 album features Jaz Coleman, singer of Killing Joke.

In 2015, Trentacoste and DJ Aladyn worked on a personal side project called The Spooky Scientists and released a cover of the Joy Division song "Insight".

Trentacoste plays guitars and synth on most albums.

== Discography ==
Marco Trentacoste

- Consequence (2020)

Xie Tian Xiao (谢天笑)

- Na Bu Shi Wo (那不是我) (Modern Sky) (2017)

KMFDM

- Rocks - Milestones Reloaded (EarMusic) (2016)

Lacuna Coil

- Visual Karma (Body, Mind and Soul) (DVD Live) – (Century Media) (2008)

Le Vibrazioni

- Officine meccaniche (album)|Officine meccaniche – (Sony Music) (2006)
- En vivo (Le Vibrazioni)|En vivo – (Sony Music) (2008)
- Le strade del tempo – (Sony Music) (2010)
- Come far nascere un fiore "The best of Le Vibrazioni" – (Sony Music) (2011)

Deasonika

- L'uomo del secolo – (Edel Italia) (2001)
- Piccoli dettagli al buio – (Edel Italia) (2004)
- Deasonika – (Edel Italia) (2006)
- Tredicipose – (Edel Italia) (2008)

Giusy Ferreri

- Il mio universo (Rca – Sony Music) (2011)
- Hits (Giusy Ferreri) (Rca – Sony Music) (2011)

Eros Ramazzotti

- Noi (Universal Music) (2012)

Rezophonic

- 'Rezophonic' – (Sugarmusic) (2006)

Delta V

- Marta ha fatto un sogno (Clockwork Remix) – (Sony Music) (2000)
- Monaco '74 – (Bmg/Ricordi) (2001)
- Le cose cambiano (Delta V)|Le cose cambiano – (Bmg/Ricordi)

Paolo Martella

- Dove mi hai portato? – (Epic Sony Music) (1997)
- Più simile a me – (Epic Sony Music) (1999)

Bluvertigo

- Altre forme di vita (Clockwork Remix) – (Sony Music) (1998)

Soerba

- I am Happy (Clockwork Remix) – (Polygram) (1998)
