= The Night Before =

The Night Before may refer to:

== Film ==
- The Night Before (1988 film), a 1988 film starring Keanu Reeves and Lori Loughlin
- The Night Before (2015 film), a 2015 film starring Joseph Gordon-Levitt and Seth Rogen

== Music ==
- The Night Before (Hooverphonic album), a 2010 album by Hooverphonic
- The Night Before (James album), a 2010 mini-album by the British band James
- "The Night Before" (song), a 1965 song by The Beatles
