= Blue Wonder Power Milk =

Studio album by Hooverphonic
- Released: 11 May 1998
- Studio: Midas (Lokeren); Galaxy (Mol); Battery (New York, New York)
- Genre: Dream pop; indie pop; trip hop
- Length: 46:17
- Label: Columbia
- Producer: Hooverphonic; Mark Plati

Hooverphonic chronology
A New Stereophonic Sound Spectacular (1996)	Blue Wonder Power Milk (1998)	The Magnificent Tree (2000)

Singles from Blue Wonder Power Milk
- 1. "Club Montepulciano" Released: 1998; 2. "This Strange Effect" Released: 1998; 3. "Eden" Released: 1999; 4. "Lung" Released: 1999

Professional ratings
Review scores
Source	Rating
AllMusic	4.5/5 stars
Pitchfork	7.1/10

Blue Wonder Power Milk is the second studio album by the Belgian band Hooverphonic, released on 11 May 1998 by Columbia Records. It is the band's first album with lead singer Geike Arnaert.

"Club Montepulciano", "This Strange Effect", "Eden", and "Lung" were released as singles from Blue Wonder Power Milk, with "Eden" peaking at number 12 on the Walloon Ultratop singles chart. The album was released in the United States on 11 August 1998 by Epic Records.

The photograph on the cover of the album is of the interior of the Atomium in Brussels.

== Composition ==
MacKenzie Wilson of AllMusic characterised Blue Wonder Power Milk as an album of dream pop, indie pop, and trip hop music. Wilson wrote that the songs on the album are "intricately woven with string arrangements and pulsating dance club beats for a drowsy feel."

== Track listing ==
All tracks are written by Alex Callier, except where noted

No.	Title	Writer(s)	Length
1.	"Battersea"		3:50
2.	"One Way Ride"		3:22
3.	"Dictionary"		3:32
4.	"Club Montepulciano"		3:40
5.	"Eden"		3:33
6.	"Lung"		2:44
7.	"Electro Shock Faders"		3:06
8.	"Out of Tune"	Frank Duchêne	3:26
9.	"This Strange Effect"	Ray Davies	3:55
10.	"Renaissance Affair"		3:24
11.	"Tuna"	Callier; Kyoko Baertsoen	3:47
12.	"Magenta"		4:50
13.	"Blue Wonder Power Milk" (CD edition hidden track)	Callier; Raymond Geerts	3:08
Total length:			46:17

== Personnel ==
Credits are adapted from the album's liner notes.

Hooverphonic

- Geike Arnaert – vocals
- Alex Callier – guitars, string arrangements, programming, keyboards, vocals
- Frank Duchêne – keyboards, engineering, backing vocals
- Raymond Geerts – guitars

Additional musicians

- Herb Besson – trombone (tracks 2, 9)
- Eric Bosteels – drums and various percussion (tracks 1–6, 8, 9, 11, 12)
- Michael Davis – trombone (tracks 2, 9)
- Ryoji Hata – vocals (track 12)
- The Hooverphonic String Orchestra (Cristina Constantinescu, Claire Delplanque, Grietje François, Véronique Gilis, Tine Janssens, Jan Buysschaert, Herwig Coryn, Joost Cuypen, Henk De Bruycker, Patrick De Neef, Otto Derolez, Maurits Goossens, Karel Ingelaere, Bart Lemmens, Sofia Pevenage, Peter Van der Weerd, Gunther Van Rompaey, and Marc Tooten) – strings (tracks 1, 4, 5, 7, 9–12)
- Ronny Mosuse – bass (tracks 4, 10)
- Mark Plati – programming (tracks 2, 5, 8, 9, 12), rhythm programming (tracks 1, 10), acoustic guitar (tracks 4, 11), bass (tracks 6, 8), vocals (track 12)
- Dave Richards – upright bass (tracks 2, 3, 9)
- Mark Steylaerts – orchestra leader
- Alex Van Aeken – horns (tracks 5, 7, 10)
- Joris Van den Hauwe – conducting, oboe (tracks 2, 5)
- Rik Vercruysse – horns (tracks 5, 7, 10)

Production

- Jérôme Blondel – assistance
- Tony De Block – assistance
- Dante DeSole – assistance
- Jed Hackett – assistance
- Filip Heurckmans – assistance
- Hooverphonic – production, recording
- Bob Ludwig – mastering
- Mark Plati – production, mixing, recording
- Jean-Marie Quentin – assistance
- Tim Roggeman – assistance

Design

- Wim Allegaert – photography
- Power & Glory – corporate design

== Charts ==
Chart (1998–1999)	Peak position
Belgian Albums (Ultratop Flanders)	7
Belgian Albums (Ultratop Wallonia)	32
