= Mad About You (Hooverphonic song) =

2000 song by Hooverphonic

Single by Hooverphonic

from the album The Magnificent Tree
- B-side: "Visions"
- Released: 2000
- Recorded: 1999
- Studio: ACP (Sint-Niklaas, Belgium); Midas (Lokeren, Belgium); SynSound (Brussels, Belgium)
- Genre: Dream pop; ambient; trip hop
- Length: 3:44
- Label: Columbia
- Songwriter: Alex Callier
- Producers: Alex Callier; Roland Herrington

Hooverphonic singles chronology
"Lung" (1998)	"Mad About You" (2000)	"Vinegar & Salt" (2000)
"Summer Sun" (2020)	"Mad About You" (2020)	"The Wrong Place" (2021)

Audio sample
- Hooverphonic - "Mad About You": file; help

Music videos
- "Mad About You" on YouTube
- "Mad About You" (version 2) on YouTube

"Mad About You" is a song by the Belgian band Hooverphonic, released as the lead single from their third studio album, The Magnificent Tree (2000). "Mad About You" is often considered the band's masterpiece and its biggest worldwide success.

The song features a sweeping string arrangement that typifies the trip hop genre. It is also similar in style to a Bond-style film theme, with its dramatic orchestration and lyrics. The song is about a forbidden love, an idea also conveyed in the video, with the lyrics of "Can someone tell me if it's wrong to be so mad about you?".

In an interview with MNM, Alex Callier revealed that the inspiration for the song came from his encounters with Cathy Dennis, who he had first met at a songwriting camp in 1998 where they had had a disagreement over fishy wine, and he also recalled a wild car ride with her through London, occasionally driving in the wrong lane. Anecdotes that ended up being referenced in the lyrics of "Mad About You".

== Music video ==
The original video written and directed by Philippe André portraits a woman played by the band's singer (Geike Arnaert ) who sings about her love for a strange plant creature living in her apartment while the police are trying to break down the door with the help of Alex Callier and Raymond Geerts

It was filmed over 2 days in London and has been selected at the Festival international du film fantastique de Gérardmer / Fantastic Arts.

== Usage in the media ==
"Mad About You" was used in the soundtrack for the films Driven (2001), New Best Friend (2002), A Lot Like Love (2005) and Ma première fois (2012).

It was used in the episode "Sanctuary" of the CBS series Cold Case (season 3, episode 15).

The song is also played in the Netflix show The Umbrella Academy (season 1, episode 8).

The song is also used in the Netflix limited series The Innocent (Episode 6)

It was used in an episode of the NBC series Las Vegas ("Games People Play": season 2, episode 6)

== Covers ==
Cantonese pop singer Joey Yung covered the song in Cantonese on her 2002 album Something About You.

== Influences ==
In its Hooverphonic with Orchestra Live version, the song features the same opening as the "Daydream" hit from another Belgian band Wallace Collection, and both songs feature themes from Swan Lake's final scene.

This was an idea from Cédric Murrath, who is both the violinist from Wallace Collection's reformation and the conductor of the Hooverphonic with Orchestra Live.

== Charts ==
Chart performance for "Mad About You"
Chart (2000–2001)	Peak position
Australia (ARIA)	146
Belgium (Ultratop 50 Flanders)	23
Belgium (Ultratop 50 Wallonia)	35
France (SNEP)	39
Italy (FIMI)	8
Netherlands (Single Top 100)	83
UK Singles (OCC)	104
