= Hooverphonic Presents Jackie Cane =

Studio album by Hooverphonic
- Released: October 28, 2002
- Genre: Trip hop; electronic; dream pop; pop
- Length: 46:05
- Label: Columbia
- Producer: Ali Staton

Hooverphonic chronology
The Magnificent Tree (2000)	Hooverphonic Presents Jackie Cane (2002)	Sit Down and Listen to Hooverphonic (2003)

Professional ratings
Review scores
Source	Rating
Allmusic	link

Hooverphonic Presents Jackie Cane is the fourth album by the Belgian band Hooverphonic. It is a concept album, telling the story of fictional singer Jackie Cane. The singles released from this album are "The World Is Mine", "Sometimes" and "One".

The story revolves around the fictitious character Jackie Cane who leaves her identical twin sister in order to become a professional singer. Driven to the brink of insanity by the pressures of fame, Jackie quits show business and returns home to attempt reconciliation with her sister. But, still bitter from years of being put last, her sister kills both of them with a poisoned Last Supper.

Jackie Cane retains the dreamy elements of Hooverphonic's previous works, most notably on songs "Nirvana Blue" and "Human Interest" (which contains references to "Echoes" by Pink Floyd), but tracks like "The World Is Mine" (the first single) and "Day After Day" have a clear Broadway influence and quality to them. The album went platinum in Belgium and won the group ZAMU's Best Pop/Rock Band and Best Album awards in 2002.

The song "Sometimes" samples the song "Young Man Cried" by The Walker Brothers. "Jackie's Delirium" contains a vocal sample of Zero-G's "Deepest India".

Also in 2003, their song "The World Is Mine" was used as the theme of the Sky One TV show Mile High.

As of November 2002 the album has sold 100,000 units worldwide.

== Track listing ==
1. "Sometimes" (Alex Callier, Scott Engel, John Franz) – 3:59
2. "One" (Callier) – 3:21
3. "Human Interest" (Callier) – 3:49
4. "Nirvana Blue" (Callier) – 4:04
5. "The World is Mine" (Geike Arnaert, Callier, Raymond Geerts) – 3:54
6. "Jackie's Delirium" (Callier) – 4:09
7. "Sad Song" (Callier) – 3:32
8. "Day After Day" (Callier) – 2:34
9. "Shampoo" (Callier) – 4:10
10. "Others Delight" (Arnaert, Callier) – 3:19
11. "Opium" (Callier, Geerts) – 3:46
12. "The Last Supper" (Callier) – 2:46
13. "The Kiss" (Callier) – 2:41

=== Special edition CD 2 ===
1. "2 Wicky" (DJ Pulse Remix) (4:08)
2. "Inhaler" (Mr. Pink Remix) (5:46)
3. "This Strange Effect" (Thievery Corporation Remix) (4:48)
4. "Eden" (Cobble Stone Garden Mix) (5:01)
5. "Vinegar & Salt" (Llorca's Half Truth Remix) (5:10)
6. "Out Of Sight" (Al Stone Mix) (3:45)
7. "Shades" (Original Soundtrack "Shades") (4:55)

== Singles ==
Year	Title	BE	NL
2002	"Sometimes"	36	69
2002	"The World is Mine"	48	-
2002	"One"	-	-

== Personnel ==
- Geike Arnaert – vocals
- Raymond Geerts – guitars
- Alex Callier – bass, programming

Additional musicians

- Simon Clarke – baritone sax, flute
- Tim Sanders – tenor sax
- Roddy Lorimer – trumpet, flügelhorn
- Paul Spong – trumpet, flügelhorn
- Annie Whitehead – trombone
- Dave Stewart – bass trombone
- the London Session Orchestra conducted by Matt Dunkley, led by Gavin Wright
- Scala & Kolacny Brothers

== Certifications ==
Region	Certification	Certified units/sales
Belgium (BRMA)	Platinum	50,000^{*}
^{*} Sales figures based on certification alone.
