= Liesje Sadonius =

Belgian singer (born 1974)

- Born: 6 August 1974 (age 52); Lokeren, Belgium
- Genres: Trip hop; downtempo
- Occupations: Singer, songwriter
- Years active: 1995–1998; 2007–2010
- Label: Columbia
- Formerly of: Hooverphonic

Liesje Sadonius (born 6 August 1974) is a Flemish singer-songwriter and a spiritual life coach. She is mostly known for her work as the lead singer of the Belgian trip hop band Hooverphonic.

== Hooverphonic ==
Sadonius became the lead singer of Hooverphonic (then Hoover) in 1995. The band recorded their debut album A New Stereophonic Sound Spectacular in 1996 and gained international recognition through featuring of the Hooverphonic's track "2Wicky" on the soundtrack of Bernardo Bertolucci's 1996 film Stealing Beauty. Shortly after the album release Sadonius left on amicable terms.

== After Hooverphonic: Suzanina ==
After leaving Hooverphonic, Sadonius launched her solo career as "Suzanina" and worked with various bands in Belgium and Europe under the nickname of Suzanina, collaborating with Airlock, Frank Duchêne, Ronny Mosuse, K's Choice's Gert Bettens, and Rik Rosseels. Her debut album was titled "Heavenly Juice" (2007, 2010).

Due to certain childhood experiences, she developed an interest in holistic healing and spirituality, which led her to set up a spiritual life coaching business.

== Discography ==
=== Albums with Hooverphonic ===
- A New Stereophonic Sound Spectacular (1996)

=== Albums with Suite 406 ===
- Deep & Closer (2009)

=== EPs (solo) ===
- Heavenly Juice (Demo) (2007)
- Heavenly Juice (2010)

=== Singles with Hooverphonic ===
- Inhaler (1996)
- 2Wicky (1996)
- Wardrope (1996)
- Barabas (1996)
