= List of number-one albums of 2013 (Belgium) =

The Belgian Albums Chart, divided into the two main regions Flanders and Wallonia, ranks the best-performing albums in Belgium, as compiled by Ultratop.

== Flanders ==
Issue date	Album	Artist	Reference
5 January	The Broken Circle Breakdown	Soundtrack	
12 January	The Broken Circle Breakdown	Soundtrack	
19 January	The Broken Circle Breakdown	Soundtrack	
26 January	The Broken Circle Breakdown	Soundtrack	
2 February	The Broken Circle Breakdown	Soundtrack	
9 February	The Broken Circle Breakdown	Soundtrack	
16 February	Wonderful, Glorious	Eels	
23 February	Push the Sky Away	Nick Cave and the Bad Seeds	
2 March	Push the Sky Away	Nick Cave and the Bad Seeds	
9 March	Rouge ardent	Axelle Red	
16 March	The Next Day	David Bowie	
23 March	The Next Day	David Bowie	
30 March	The Next Day	David Bowie	
6 April	The Next Day	David Bowie	
13 April	The Next Day	David Bowie	
20 April	To Be Loved	Michael Bublé	
27 April	Le franc Belge	Daan	
4 May	Le franc Belge	Daan	
11 May	Le franc Belge	Daan	
18 May	Stay Gold	Ozark Henry	
25 May	Random Access Memories	Daft Punk	
1 June	Random Access Memories	Daft Punk	
8 June	Random Access Memories	Daft Punk	
15 June	...Like Clockwork	Queens of the Stone Age	
22 June	Random Access Memories	Daft Punk	
29 June	Undercover	Milk Inc.	
6 July	Undercover	Milk Inc.	
13 July	The Weight of Your Love	Editors	
20 July	The Weight of Your Love	Editors	
27 July	The Weight of Your Love	Editors	
3 August	The Weight of Your Love	Editors	
10 August	Christoff & vrienden 2	Christoff	
17 August	Christoff & vrienden 2	Christoff	
24 August	Christoff & vrienden 2	Christoff	
31 August	Racine carrée	Stromae	
7 September	Racine carrée	Stromae	
14 September	Racine carrée	Stromae	
21 September	AM	Arctic Monkeys	
28 September	AM	Arctic Monkeys	
5 October	Racine carrée	Stromae	
12 October	Aventine	Agnes Obel	
19 October	Racine carrée	Stromae	
26 October	Lightning Bolt	Pearl Jam	
2 November	Racine carrée	Stromae	
9 November	Reflektor	Arcade Fire	
16 November	The Marshall Mathers LP 2	Eminem	
23 November	Reflection	Hooverphonic	
30 November	Clouseau	Clouseau	
7 December	Midnight Memories	One Direction	
14 December	Racine carrée	Stromae	
21 December	Racine carrée	Stromae	
28 December	Racine carrée	Stromae	

== Wallonia ==
Issue date	Album	Artist	Reference
5 January	Sans attendre	Céline Dion	
12 January	Sans attendre	Céline Dion	
19 January	Millésimes	Pascal Obispo	
26 January	Millésimes	Pascal Obispo	
2 February	Millésimes	Pascal Obispo	
9 February	Millésimes	Pascal Obispo	
16 February	Millésimes	Pascal Obispo	
23 February	Black City Parade	Indochine	
2 March	Black City Parade	Indochine	
9 March	Black City Parade	Indochine	
16 March	The Next Day	David Bowie	
23 March	La boîte à musique des Enfoirés	Les Enfoirés	
30 March	La boîte à musique des Enfoirés	Les Enfoirés	
6 April	Delta Machine	Depeche Mode	
13 April	To Win The World	Puggy	
20 April	To Win The World	Puggy	
27 April	Le Secret	Lara Fabian	
4 May	Quelques mots d'amour	Frank Michael	
11 May	Quelques mots d'amour	Frank Michael	
18 May	Quelques mots d'amour	Frank Michael	
25 May	Random Access Memories	Daft Punk	
1 June	Random Access Memories	Daft Punk	
8 June	Random Access Memories	Daft Punk	
15 June	Ma déclaration	Jenifer	
22 June	Je veux du bonheur	Christophe Maé	
29 June	Je veux du bonheur	Christophe Maé	
6 July	Je veux du bonheur	Christophe Maé	
13 July	Je veux du bonheur	Christophe Maé	
20 July	Je veux du bonheur	Christophe Maé	
27 July	Je veux du bonheur	Christophe Maé	
3 August	Je veux du bonheur	Christophe Maé	
10 August	Je veux du bonheur	Christophe Maé	
17 August	Je veux du bonheur	Christophe Maé	
24 August	Subliminal	Maître Gims	
31 August	Racine carrée	Stromae	
7 September	Racine carrée	Stromae	
14 September	Racine carrée	Stromae	
21 September	Racine carrée	Stromae	
28 September	Racine carrée	Stromae	
5 October	Racine carrée	Stromae	
12 October	Racine carrée	Stromae	
19 October	Racine carrée	Stromae	
26 October	Racine carrée	Stromae	
2 November	Racine carrée	Stromae	
9 November	Racine carrée	Stromae	
16 November	Vieillir avec toi	Florent Pagny	
23 November	Racine carrée	Stromae	
30 November	Racine carrée	Stromae	
7 December	Racine carrée	Stromae	
14 December	Racine carrée	Stromae	
21 December	Racine carrée	Stromae	
28 December	Racine carrée	Stromae	
