= The Night Before (Hooverphonic album) =

Studio album by Hooverphonic
- Released: 29 November 2010
- Recorded: 2010
- Studio: ICP Studio, Brussels; Marfy Stent Studio, Gallarate; Pink Flamingo, Sint-Niklaas
- Length: 38:06
- Label: Columbia
- Producer: Alex Callier

Hooverphonic chronology
The President of the LSD Golf Club (2007)	The Night Before (2010)	Hooverphonic with Orchestra (2012)

The Night Before is the seventh studio album of Belgian band Hooverphonic, and the first album with female singer Noémie Wolfs. The album went platinum in Belgium, shortly after the release. The two main singles "The Night Before" and "Anger Never Dies" entered the top five of the Flemish singles chart.

== Track listing ==
All songs written by Alex Callier, except where noted.

1. "Anger Never Dies" – 3:30
2. "The Night Before" (Callier, Raymond Geerts) – 2:48
3. "Heartbroken" (Callier, Luca Chiaravalli) – 2:47
4. "Norwegian Stars" – 3:09
5. "More" – 2:36
6. "One Two Three" (Callier, Geerts) – 3:00
7. "George's Café" – 3:49
8. "Identical Twin" (Callier, Cathy Dennis) – 2:38
9. "Encoded Love" – 3:28
10. "How Can You Sleep" (Callier, Geerts) – 3:50
11. "Sunday Afternoon" – 3:25
12. "Danger Zone" – 3:06

== Chart performance ==
=== Weekly charts ===
Chart (2010–2011)	Peak position
Belgian Albums (Ultratop Flanders)	2
Belgian Albums (Ultratop Wallonia)	9
Italian Albums (FIMI)	68
Dutch Albums (Album Top 100)	34

=== Year-end charts ===
Chart (2010)	Position
Belgian Albums (Ultratop Flanders)	65
Chart (2011)	Position
Belgian Albums (Ultratop Flanders)	3
Belgian Albums (Ultratop Wallonia)	18

== Certifications ==
Region	Certification	Certified units/sales
Belgium (BRMA)	Platinum	30,000^{*}
^{*} Sales figures based on certification alone.
