= Singles '96–'06 =

Greatest hits album by Hooverphonic
- Released: 21 November 2006
- Genre: Trip hop; electronic; dream pop
- Label: Sony BMG

Hooverphonic chronology
No More Sweet Music (2005)	Singles '96–'06 (2006)	The President of the LSD Golf Club (2007)

Singles '96–'06 is an anthology of the Belgian band Hooverphonic's singles. It compiles single versions of tracks from all of the band's previous albums. Two-disc editions include a DVD collecting all the corresponding music videos and a complete concert.

== Track listing ==
Disc 1 – CD

1. "Inhaler"
2. "Wardrope"
3. "2Wicky"
4. "Barabas"
5. "Club Montepulciano"
6. "Eden"
7. "This Strange Effect"
8. "Jackie Cane"
9. "Mad About You"
10. "Out of Sight" (Al Stone Mix)
11. "Vinegar & Salt"
12. "Sometimes"
13. "The World Is Mine"
14. "One"
15. "The Last Thing I Need Is You"
16. "Wake Up"
17. "You Hurt Me"
18. "We All Float"
19. "Dirty Lenses" (Remixed by Alex Callier)
20. "Lung" (Happy Go Disco Remix)

Disc 2 – DVD

1. "Inhaler"
2. "2Wicky"
3. "Club Montepulciano"
4. "Eden"
5. "This Strange Effect"
6. "Jackie Cane"
7. "Mad About You"
8. "Out of Sight"
9. "Vinegar & Salt"
10. "Sometimes"
11. "The World Is Mine"
12. "One"
13. "The Last Thing I Need Is You"
14. "Wake Up"
15. "You Hurt Me"
16. "Dirty Lenses"
17. + 90 minutes concert “Live @ the AB”

== Charts ==
=== Weekly charts ===
Chart (2006)	Peak position
Belgian Albums (Ultratop Flanders)	8
Belgian Albums (Ultratop Wallonia)	22

=== Year-end charts ===
Chart (2006)	Position
Belgian Albums (Ultratop Flanders)	86
Chart (2007)	Position
Belgian Albums (Ultratop Flanders)	67

== Certifications ==
Region	Certification
Belgium (BRMA)	Platinum
