= Lujon (musical instrument) =

Musical instrument in the percussion family

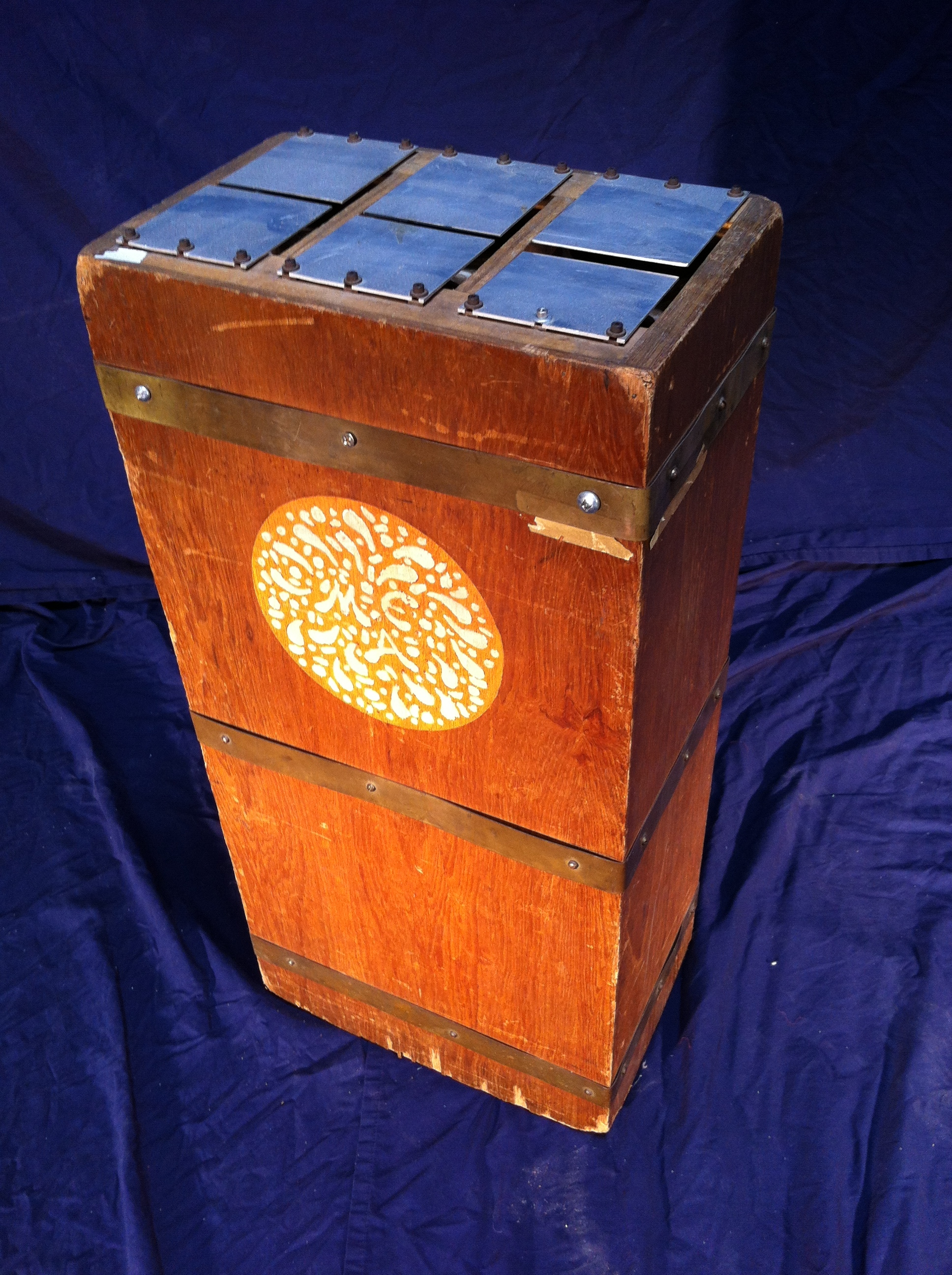
- Lujon with pitches A♭2, B♭2, D3, F3, G3, and A3

Percussion instrument
- Other names: Loo-jon; Metal log drum
- Classification: Percussion (Metallophone)
- Hornbostel–Sachs classification: 111.222 (Directly struck idiophone)
- Inventor: William Loughborough
- Developed: Middle 20th century
- Volume: Low

Playing range
- Varies depending on configuration

The lujon (/ˈluːdʒɒn/ LOO-jon) is a bass metallophone consisting of individually-pitched metal plates that are attached to the resonance chambers of a partitioned wooden box.

== History ==
The lujon was invented by William Loughborough. At his Sausalito, California studio, Loughborough created a variety of new percussion instruments, including the boobam and lujon, after working with Harry Partch in the mid-1950s.

The lujon is played with soft mallets and produces a sound that is dominated by its fundamental frequency. The instrument is also known as a loo-jon or metal log drum. In a 2009 Web post, Loughborough provided the following historical background: "Henry Mancini's drummer, Shelly Manne had several drums I made and one of them was the Lujon (a pun on 'John Lewis' who bought the first one). Mancini was very impressed with the instrument and wrote ['Lujon'] using its scale as the theme."

On 7 April 2010, Loughborough died of a heart attack in Madrid, Spain, at the age of 84.

== Composers ==
Composers who have written for lujon include Jerry Goldsmith, Gerald Fried, Dave Grusin, Clare Fischer, Colin Matthews and John Williams. Henry Mancini used it in his score for Hatari!, and also featured the instrument in a composition called "Lujon." Shelly Manne used the instrument for the theme music of the 1960s television series Daktari. A sample of Mancini's "Lujon" was used in the Black Mighty Orchestra's "Ocean Beach" remix (2001).
