= Eliot Vassamillet =

Belgian singer (born 2000)

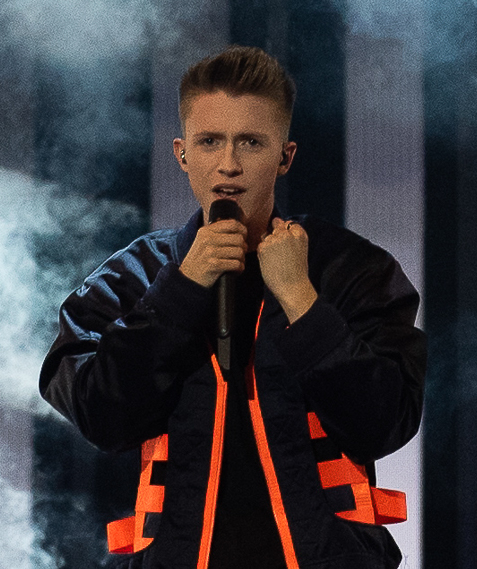

Background information
- Born: Eliot Vassamillet; 29 December 2000 (age 25); Mons, Belgium
- Origin: Belgium
- Occupation: Singer
- Years active: 2018-present

Eliot Vassamillet (born 29 December 2000) is a Belgian singer. He represented Belgium in the Eurovision Song Contest 2019 with the song "Wake Up". Prior to Eurovision, he competed in the seventh season of The Voice Belgique in 2018.

== Career ==
=== The Voice Belgique ===
Vassamillet participated in the seventh season of The Voice Belgique in 2018. In the auditions he performed High Hopes. Vassamillet chose to be part of Slimane's team.

In the duels, Vassamillet was paired against Paak Kormongkolkul and they sang Mad World. Vassamillet won the duel and went through to the live shows where he performed Alter Ego. He failed to advance to the finals and left the show at this stage.

=== Eurovision Song Contest 2019 ===
On 14 January 2019, Télépro published an article claiming that Vassamillet had been selected to represent Belgium in the Eurovision Song Contest 2019. The following day, RTBF officially confirmed this information, also announcing that his entry would be co-written by Pierre Demoulin, the lead singer of Belgian rock group Roscoe.

On 28 February 2019 it was officially confirmed that Vassamillet would compete with the song"Wake Up".

At the contest he was drawn to perform in the first semi-final where he placed 13th with 70 points. As he did not place in the top ten, he did not progress to the Grand Final of the competition.

== Discography ==
=== Albums ===
Title	Details
Mixtape n°1	Released: 11 February 2022; Formats: Digital download, streaming

=== Extended plays ===
Title	Details
Where Everything Begins	Released: 27 July 2022; Formats: Digital download, streaming

=== Singles ===
Title	Year	Peak chart positions		Album or EP
Title	Year	BEL (FL)	BEL (WA)	Album or EP
"Wake Up"	2019	35	27	Non-album singles
"Find A Way"	2021	—	—	Non-album singles
"Sad (run)"	2022	—	—	Non-album singles
"Late At Night"	2022	—	—	Non-album singles
"Chosen"	2022	—	—	Non-album singles
"—" denotes a recording that did not chart or was not released.

Preceded by Sennek with "A Matter of Time"	Belgium in the Eurovision Song Contest; 2019	Succeeded by Hooverphonic with "Release Me"
