= A Matter of Time (Sennek song) =

2018 song by Sennek

Single by Sennek
- Released: 5 March 2018
- Genre: Pop; Downtempo
- Length: 3:00
- Label: VRT Muziek
- Songwriter(s): Laura Groeseneken; Alex Callier; Maxime Tribèche
- Producer(s): Maxime Tribèche

Sennek singles chronology
"A Matter of Time" (2018)	"Endlessly" (2019)

Music video
- "A Matter of Time" on YouTube

Eurovision Song Contest 2018 entry
- Country: Belgium
- Artist(s): Sennek
- Language: English
- Composer(s): Laura Groeseneken; Alex Callier; Maxime Tribèche
- Lyricist(s): Laura Groeseneken; Alex Callier; Maxime Tribèche

Finals performance
- Semi-final result: 12th
- Semi-final points: 91

Entry chronology
- ◄ "City Lights" (2017)
- "Wake Up" (2019) ►

"A Matter of Time" is a song recorded by Belgian singer-songwriter Sennek, best known for representing Belgium in the Eurovision Song Contest 2018. Sennek co-wrote the track with Alex Callier and Maxime Tribèche. The song was officially released on 5 March 2018, one day before its scheduled release, as it was already leaked on YouTube.

== Eurovision Song Contest ==
On 28 September 2017, Flemish broadcaster VRT announced Laura Groeseneken as the Belgian entrant at the Eurovision Song Contest 2018 during the talk show Van Gils & gasten, aired on Één. It was later announced that Groeseneken will perform under her stage name Sennek.

The song was initially scheduled to be released on 6 March 2018 but was eventually released one day earlier after it was leaked on YouTube.

Sennek's "A Matter of Time" competed in the first semi-final, held on 8 May 2018 in Lisbon, Portugal, but did not qualify for the Grand Final.

== Track listing ==
Digital download
No.	Title	Length
1.	"A Matter of Time"	3:00

== Charts ==
=== Weekly charts ===
Chart (2018)	Peak position
Belgium (Ultratop 50 Flanders)	9
Belgium (Ultratip Bubbling Under Wallonia)	16

=== Year-end charts ===
Chart (2018)	Position
Belgium (Ultratop Flanders)	91
