= The Wrong Place =

2021 song by Hooverphonic

Single by Hooverphonic

from the album Hidden Stories
- Released: 4 March 2021
- Length: 2:56
- Label: Universal Music
- Songwriters: Alex Callier; Charlotte Forêt
- Producer: Alex Callier

Hooverphonic singles chronology
"Mad About You" (2020)	"The Wrong Place" (2021)	"Thinking About You" (2021)

Music video
- "The Wrong Place" on YouTube

Eurovision Song Contest 2021 entry
- Country: Belgium
- Artist: Hooverphonic
- Language: English
- Composers: Alex Callier; Charlotte Forêt
- Lyricists: Alex Callier; Charlotte Forêt

Finals performance
- Semi-final result: 9th
- Semi-final points: 117
- Final result: 19th
- Final points: 74

Entry chronology
- ◄ "Release Me" (2020)
- "Miss You" (2022) ►

"The Wrong Place" is a song by Belgian band Hooverphonic. The song represented Belgium in the Eurovision Song Contest 2021 in Rotterdam, the Netherlands, after being internally selected by the national broadcasters Vlaamse Radio- en Televisieomroeporganisatie (VRT) and Radio Télévision Belge de la Communauté Française (RTBF).

== Eurovision Song Contest ==
=== Internal selection ===
On 20 March 2020, VRT and RTBF announced Belgian band Hooverphonic as the country's representative for the Eurovision Song Contest 2021.

=== At Eurovision ===
The 65th edition of the Eurovision Song Contest took place in Rotterdam, the Netherlands and consisted of two semi-finals on 18 May and 20 May 2021, and the grand final on 22 May 2021. According to the Eurovision rules, all participating countries, except the host nation and the "Big Five", consisting of France, Germany, Italy, Spain and the United Kingdom, are required to qualify from one of two semi-finals to compete for the final, although the top 10 countries from the respective semi-final progress to the grand final. On 17 November 2020, it was announced that Belgium would be performing in the second half of the first semi-final of the contest. Hooverphonic performed in the eleventh slot in the semi-final, and qualified for the grand final in 9th place, receiving 117 points. The song finished in 19th place in the final, receiving 74 points.

== Charts ==
=== Weekly charts ===
Weekly chart performance for "The Wrong Place"
Chart (2021)	Peak position
Belgium (Ultratop 50 Flanders)	1
Belgium (Ultratop 50 Wallonia)	27
Greece International (IFPI)	94
Lithuania (AGATA)	15
Netherlands (Single Top 100)	89
Sweden Heatseeker (Sverigetopplistan)	1
UK Singles Downloads (OCC)	77

=== Year-end charts ===
Year-end chart performance for "The Wrong Place"
Chart (2021)	Position
Belgium (Ultratop Flanders)	73

== Certifications ==
Certifications and sales for "The Wrong Place"
Region	Certification	Certified units/sales
Belgium (BRMA)	Gold	20,000^{‡}
^{‡} Sales+streaming figures based on certification alone.
