= A New Stereophonic Sound Spectacular =

- First issue, credited to Hoover

Studio album by Hooverphonic
- Released: 29 July 1996
- Studio: ACP (Sint-Niklaas); Galaxy (Mol)
- Genre: Trip hop; ambient pop
- Length: 47:05
- Label: Columbia
- Producer: Hooverphonic

Hooverphonic chronology
A New Stereophonic Sound Spectacular (1996)	Blue Wonder Power Milk (1998)

Singles from A New Stereophonic Sound Spectacular
- 1. "Wardrope" Released: 1996; 2. "2Wicky" Released: 1996; 3. "Inhaler" Released: 1996; 4. "Barabas" Released: 1997

Professional ratings
Review scores
Source	Rating
AllMusic	3/5 stars
Pitchfork	8.1/10
USA Today	3/4 stars

A New Stereophonic Sound Spectacular is the debut studio album by the Belgian band Hooverphonic. The album was released by Columbia Records on 29 July 1996, initially credited to the band's original name, Hoover. It is Hooverphonic's only album with lead singer Liesje Sadonius.

A New Stereophonic Sound Spectacular produced the singles "Wardrope", "2Wicky", "Inhaler", and "Barabas". On 15 April 1997, the album was released in the United States by Epic Records. By June 1998, it had sold over 140,000 copies worldwide.

In 2011, a deluxe edition of A New Stereophonic Sound Spectacular was released as a box set including the original album on both CD and LP, two bonus CDs containing remixes and rarities from the era, artwork prints, and a book of essays by the members of Hooverphonic about the album.

== Composition ==
The song "2Wicky" samples Isaac Hayes' 1969 rendition of "Walk On By", as well as "Le Voile d'Orphée" by Pierre Henry.

"Plus Profond" was reworked for A New Stereophonic Sound Spectacular from its original version, which contained a sample that could not be cleared. This version would later be performed live by Hooverphonic on their New Stereophonic Spectacular tour in 2006, and it was eventually released on the 2011 deluxe edition of A New Stereophonic Sound Spectacular.

== Track listing ==
No.	Title	Writer(s)	Length
1.	"Inhaler"	Alex Callier; Raymond Geerts	5:11
2.	"2Wicky"	Callier; Geerts; Burt Bacharach; Hal David; Pierre Henry	4:44
3.	"Wardrope"	Callier; Geerts	4:31
4.	"Plus Profond"	Callier	4:24
5.	"Barabas"	Callier	3:50
6.	"Cinderella"	Callier; Geerts; Frank Duchêne; Liesje Sadonius	3:52
7.	"Nr 9"	Callier	3:38
8.	"Sarangi"	Callier	4:16
9.	"Someone"	Callier; Geerts; Duchêne; Sadonius	4:11
10.	"Revolver"	Callier	3:54
11.	"Innervoice"	Callier; Geerts	4:34
Total length:			47:05

Deluxe edition disc two (Remixes)
No.	Title	Writer(s)	Length
1.	"2Wicky" (DJ Pulse remix)	Callier; Geerts; Bacharach; David; Henry	6:24
2.	"2Wicky" (DJ Pulse dub)	Callier; Geerts; Bacharach; David; Henry	6:24
3.	"2Wicky" (Not So Extended Hoovering mix)	Callier; Geerts; Bacharach; David; Henry	3:41
4.	"2Wicky" (Steve Hillier version)	Callier; Geerts; Bacharach; David; Henry	6:43
5.	"Inhaler" (Drum 'n' Orch remix; by Hoover)	Callier; Geerts	4:27
6.	"Inhaler" (Mr Pink remix; by Hector Zazou)	Callier; Geerts	5:47
7.	"Inhaler" (Mr Brown remix; by Hector Zazou)	Callier; Geerts	6:48
8.	"Inhaler (CJ's Multicolored Rhythm Injection)" (radio edit)	Callier; Geerts	3:37
9.	"Inhaler (CJ's Multicolored Rhythm Injection)"	Callier; Geerts	6:09
10.	"Wardrope" (Jungle remix)	Callier; Geerts	5:50
Total length:			55:50

Deluxe edition disc three (Rarities)
No.	Title	Writer(s)	Length
1.	"Plus Profond" (original recording)	Callier	3:58
2.	"Inhaler" (original demo; featuring Esther Lybeert)	Callier; Geerts	5:09
3.	"Cinderella" (original demo; featuring Esther Lybeert)	Callier; Geerts; Duchêne; Sadonius	3:24
4.	"Nr 9" (original demo; featuring Esther Lybeert)	Callier	3:49
5.	"Revolver" (original demo; featuring Esther Lybeert)	Callier	3:24
6.	"Instrumental"	Callier	5:16
7.	"Inhaler" (Studio Brussel Basta session, 16 January 1997)	Callier; Geerts	3:46
8.	"Someone" (Studio Brussel Basta session, 16 January 1997)	Callier; Geerts; Duchêne; Sadonius	3:12
Total length:			31:58

Sample credits

- "2Wicky" contains samples of "Walk On By", written by Burt Bacharach and Hal David and performed by Isaac Hayes; and "Le Voile d'Orphée", written and performed by Pierre Henry.
- "Plus Profond" (original recording) contains samples of "007 and Counting", performed by John Barry.

== Personnel ==
Credits are adapted from the album's liner notes.

Hooverphonic

- Liesje Sadonius – vocals
- Raymond Geerts – guitars, breaths
- Frank Duchêne – engineering, keyboards
- Alex Callier – programming, keyboards

Additional musicians

- Eric Bosteels – drums on "Inhaler", "Nr 9", "Sarangi", "Revolver" and "Innervoice"
- Stefan Bracoval – flute on "Wardrope"
- Sven Muller – bass on "Cinderella"
- Charlotte Van de Perre – Spanish parlando vocals on "Cinderella"
- Ursi Vanderherten – French parlando vocals on "Plus Profond"

Production

- Benjamin Bertozzi – mixing (assistant) on "Plus Profond"
- Ian Cooper – mastering
- Jake Davies – mixing (assistant), analogue tape phasing
- Kees de Visser – mastering on "Wardrope", "Barabas" and "Sarangi"
- Roland Herrington – mixing
- Hooverphonic – production, engineering, mixing on "Plus Profond"

Design

- Power & Glory – cover design

== Charts ==
Chart (1996)	Peak position
Belgian Albums (Ultratop Flanders)	17
Belgian Albums (Ultratop Wallonia)	32
