= Release Me (Hooverphonic song) =

2020 song by Hooverphonic

Single by Hooverphonic
- Released: 17 February 2020
- Length: 3:05
- Label: Universal Music
- Songwriters: Alex Callier; Luca Chiaravalli
- Producer: Alex Callier

Hooverphonic singles chronology
"Horrible Person" (2019)	"Release Me" (2020)	"Summer Sun" (2020)

Music video
- "Release Me" on YouTube

Eurovision Song Contest 2020 entry
- Country: Belgium
- Artist: Hooverphonic
- Composers: Alex Callier; Luca Chiaravalli
- Lyricist: Alex Callier

Finals performance
- Semi-final result: Contest cancelled

Entry chronology
- ◄ "Wake Up" (2019)
- "The Wrong Place" (2021) ►

"Release Me" is a song by the Belgian band Hooverphonic. It would have represented Belgium in the Eurovision Song Contest 2020. The song was released as a digital download on 17 February 2020.

== Eurovision Song Contest ==
The song would have represented Belgium in the Eurovision Song Contest 2020, after Hooverphonic was internally selected by the national broadcaster VRT. On 28 January 2020, a special allocation draw was held which placed each country into one of the two semi-finals, as well as which half of the show they would perform in. Belgium was placed into the first semi-final, to be held on 12 May 2020, and was scheduled to perform in the second half of the show.

== Charts ==
Chart (2020)	Peak position
Belgium (Ultratop 50 Flanders)	21
Belgium (Ultratip Bubbling Under Wallonia)	24

== Release history ==
Region	Date	Format	Label	Ref.
Various	17 February 2020	Digital download, streaming	Universal Music Belgium	
