= Télépro =

French language magazine

Télépro is a Belgian French language weekly TV listings magazine jointly owned by Roularta and Bayard Presse, as a Société Anonyme under the corporate name "Belgomedia".
