= Expedition Impossible (song) =

Single by Hooverphonic

from the album The President of the LSD Golf Club
- B-side: "Pink Flamingo Dream"
- Released: September 24, 2007 (Belgium/Holland); January 2008 (World)
- Length: 4:08
- Songwriter: Alex Callier

Hooverphonic singles chronology
"We All Float" (2006)	"Expedition Impossible" (2007)	"Gentle Storm" (2007)

"Expedition Impossible" is a song performed by Belgian group Hooverphonic. The song was the lead single from the group's sixth studio album The President of the LSD Golf Club (2008). The song is more similar to traditional rock music than previous Hooverphonic songs.

== Music video ==
The music video for "Expedition Impossible" was filmed in Moscow, Russia in 2006. It features the band (Alex, Geike and Raymond) walking through the streets and subways of Moscow, intercut with footage of the band playing at B-2 in Moscow.

The video is entirely black and white.

== Song information ==
Expedition Impossible was premiered at B-2 is Moscow. Alex told audience members that there were cameras in the room and footage would be taken so if audience members were lucky they might "feature in (Hooverphonic's) new video". Some of the footage appeared in the music video.

== Chart performance ==
Chart (2007)	Peak position
Belgian Charts	30
