= Rezophonic =

Rezophonic is a musical project organized by Mario Riso, who is also co-founder of Rock TV in Italy. The money gained will be devolved to the African Medical and Research Foundation (AMREF).

== Members ==
=== Voices ===
- Olly (The Fire-Shandon)
- Cristina Scabbia (Lacuna Coil)
- Vittoria Hyde
- Pau (Negrita)
- Giuliano Sangiorgi (Negramaro)
- Mono (FFD)
- Diego Mancino
- DJ Ringo (Virgin Radio)
- Gianluca Perotti (Extrema)
- Emo and Nitto (Linea 77)
- Mana (Folder)
- L'Aura
- Lella (Settevite)
- Madaski
- Micky (No Relax)
- Francesco Sarcina (Le Vibrazioni)
- David Moretti (Karma)
- Pino Scotto (Fire Trails)
- Max Zanotti (Deasonika)
- Marco Cocci (Malfunk)
- Morena (Macbeth)
- Eva Poles (Prozac+)
- Andrea Ferro (Lacuna Coil/Roskos/Virgin Radio/Andead)

=== Bass Guitarists ===
- William Nicastro
- Jan Galliani (Settevite)
- Patrick Djivas (P.F.M.)
- Marco Castellani (Le Vibrazioni/Octopus)
- Sem (Guilty Method)
- Saturnino (Jovanotti)
- Roberta Sammarelli (Verdena)
- Silvio Franco
- Ivan "Liva" Lodini (Movida)
- Paletta (Punkreas)
- Giuseppe Fiori

=== Guitarists ===
- Fabio Mittino
- Tommy Massara (Extrema)
- Marco Trentacoste (Deasonika)
- Omar Pedrini
- Maus (Lacuna Coil)
- Pier Gonella
- Cesare Petricich (Negrita)
- Stefano Brandori
- Max Brigante
- Michele Albè (Piks)
- Fausto Cogliati
- Stef Burns
- Nikki
- Joxemi (Ska-P)
- J.L. Battaglioni (Movida)
- Giovanni Frigo (Movida)
- Livio Magnini (Bluvertigo)
- Noyse (Punkreas)
- Pietro Quilichini

=== Others ===
- Roy Paci
- Andy (Bluvertigo)
- Tullio De Piscopo (Batteria/Percussioni)
- Mario Riso
- Roberto Broggi (Guilty Method)
- Andy Trix Tripodi
- Davide Tomat
- Morgan (Bluvertigo)

=== Deejays ===
- DJ Jad (Articolo 31)
- DJ Aladyn (Mennscratch)

== Track list ==
1. Can You Hear Me? 3:16
2. Riso's Beat 2:58
3. L'Uomo Di Plastica [Intro] 2:05
4. L'Uomo Di Plastica 3:58
5. I Miei Pensieri 4:17
6. I'M Junk 2:30
7. Alien 3:36
8. Qualcuno Da Stringere 3:54
9. Non Ho Più Niente Da Dire 3:45
10. Spasimo 4:45
11. Blank In Blue 4:25
12. Spaces And Sleeping Stone 4:39
13. Puro Incanto 4:49
14. Can You Hear Me? (Remix) 5:19
15. Il Riso Di Tullio 2:45
