= The Magnificent Tree =

Studio album by Hooverphonic
- Released: 26 September 2000
- Genre: Dream pop; trip hop
- Length: 42:04
- Label: Epic
- Producer: Alex Callier; Roland Herrington

Hooverphonic chronology
Blue Wonder Power Milk (1998)	The Magnificent Tree (2000)	Hooverphonic Presents Jackie Cane (2002)

Singles from The Magnificent Tree
- 1. "Mad About You" Released: 2000; 2. "Vinegar & Salt" Released: 2000; 3. "Out of Sight" Released: 2000 (remix); 4. "Jackie Cane" Released: 2000

The Magnificent Tree is the third studio album by the Belgian band Hooverphonic, released on 26 September 2000. The cover features the band in front of a tree in the town of Kieldrecht, Belgium.

Four singles were released from the album: "Mad About You", "Vinegar & Salt", "Out of Sight" and "Jackie Cane". The "Vinegar & Salt" and "Out of Sight" singles contain "Green" and "Sunday Morning", respectively, tracks composed for The Magnificent Tree that did not make it onto the final release. By November 2002, the album had sold 265,000 copies worldwide, including 85,000 copies in Belgium alone.

The U.S. release includes the track "Renaissance Affair" as a bonus track, which also originates from their previous album Blue Wonder Power Milk.

== Background ==
The album cost 8,000,000 Bef ($170,000) to record, one of the most expensive Belgian albums ever, partly because the first three weeks of recording were thrown away, as the group were apparently heading in the wrong direction. The record company hoped to sell 500,000 copies, much more than the 150,000 of the previous two albums (the band just received a gold album for 25,000 copies of "Blue Wonder Power Milk" in Belgium).

== Composition ==
"The Magnificent Tree" contains a sample of "Guinnevere" (misspelled as Guinevere) by Crosby, Stills and Nash. "Waves" is remarkably similar to "Changes", a 1966 psychedelic pop song by The Association. "Vinegar & Salt" contains a sample of "Je Me Repose."

== Critical reception ==
Professional ratings
Aggregate scores
Source	Rating
Metacritic	57/100
Review scores
Source	Rating
AllMusic	3.5/5 stars
NME	6/10
Q	3/5 stars

The Magnificent Tree holds a score of 57 out of 100 on the review aggregator website Metacritic based on reviews from four critics, indicating "mixed or average reviews". MTV.com felt that, with the album, "Hooverphonic's sound has become increasingly hip and cosmopolitan, slowly processing out everything that made it so alluring in the first place", noting that "the nagging sense of something menacing behind these songs has practically disappeared." Conversely, according to AllMusic, "Classic embryonic vocalic beauty from Geike Arnaert still carries the translucence of the band's signature ethereality" and "songs such as 'Out of Sight' and 'Mad About You' are thoroughly dramatic and make for an illustrious listen".

== Track listing ==
No.	Title	Writer(s)	Length
1.	"Autoharp"	Alex Callier	4:21
2.	"Mad About You"	Callier	3:43
3.	"Waves"	Callier	4:01
4.	"Jackie Cane"	Callier; Cathy Dennis	4:20
5.	"The Magnificent Tree"	Callier; Geike Arnaert; Raymond Geerts; David Crosby	3:55
6.	"Vinegar & Salt"	Callier	3:20
7.	"Frosted Flake Wood"	Callier	3:17
8.	"Everytime We Live Together We Die a Bit More"	Callier	3:35
9.	"Out of Sight"	Callier	3:55
10.	"Pink Fluffy Dinosaurs"	Arnaert; Callier	3:50
11.	"L'Odeur animale"	Callier	3:47

French edition bonus tracks
No.	Title	Writer(s)	Length
12.	"Out of Sight" (Al Stone mix)	Callier	3:51
13.	"Mad About You" (FK vocal mix)	Callier	8:48

US edition bonus tracks
No.	Title	Writer(s)	Length
12.	"Renaissance Affair"	Callier	3:25

Belgian limited edition bonus disc
No.	Title	Writer(s)	Length
1.	"Visions"		11:04
2.	"Mad About You" (Llorca's Radio Shot)	Callier	4:24
3.	"Mad About You" (video)	Callier	3:53

== Personnel ==
Hooverphonic

- Geike Arnaert – vocals
- Raymond Geerts – guitars
- Alex Callier – keyboards, bass, programming, string arranged on Vinegar & Salt, production

Guests

- Michiel Dutré - cello on Frosted Flake Wood
- Youseff Yansy - theremin on Jackie Cane & theremin and trumpet on L'Odeur Animale
- Luis Jardim - percussion
- Eric Bosteels - additional drums
- Phil Chill - drum programming on Autoharp & Mad About You
- Gota Yashiki - additional drum programming on Pink Fluffy Dinosaurs & cymbal and percussion on Out of Sight
- Dan Lacksman - Fairlight programming and analog FX
- Matt Dunkley - strings on Mad About You & Out of Sight
- Gavyn Wright - 1st violin
- Perry Montague-Mason - 2nd violin
- Chris Tombling, Simon Fisher, Rebecca Hirsh, Jackie Shave, Eddy Roberts, Vaughan Armon, Dermot Crehan, Ben Cruft, Cathy Thompson, Pat Kiernan, Boguslav Kostecki, Mark Berrow - violin
- Peter Lale - 1st viola
- Bruce White, Bruce White, Bob Smissen, Katie Wilkinson - viola
- Tony Pleeth - 1st cello (misspelled as celli)
- Dave Daniels, Justin Pearson, Paul Kegg - cello
- Mary Scully, Paul Morgan - basses
- Children choir on Jackie Cane - Sarah and Catherine Butterfield, Elliot, Lewis and Chelsea Carpenter, Caitlin May Harris, Paris Starr

== Charts ==
=== Weekly charts ===
Chart (2000–03)	Peak position
Belgian Albums (Ultratop Flanders)	2
Belgian Albums (Ultratop Wallonia)	3
French Albums (SNEP)	124
Italian Albums (FIMI)	25

=== Year-end charts ===
Chart (2000)	Position
Belgian Albums (Ultratop Flanders)	17
Belgian Albums (Ultratop Wallonia)	35
Chart (2001)	Position
Belgian Albums (Ultratop Flanders)	14
Belgian Albums (Ultratop Wallonia)	65
Chart (2002)	Position
Belgian Albums (Ultratop Flanders)	93
Chart (2003)	Position
Belgian Albums (Ultratop Flanders)	36

== Certifications ==
Region	Certification	Certified units/sales
Belgium (BRMA)	2× Platinum	100,000^{*}
^{*} Sales figures based on certification alone.
