= Sit Down and Listen to Hooverphonic =

Live album by Hooverphonic
- Released: 16 December 2003
- Genre: Trip hop; electronic; dream pop

Hooverphonic chronology
Hooverphonic Presents Jackie Cane (2002)	Sit Down and Listen to Hooverphonic (2003)	No More Sweet Music (2005)

Sit Down and Listen to Hooverphonic, also known as Sit Down and Listen To, is an album by Belgian band Hooverphonic. It was recorded live with an orchestra, but without any audience and was released in 2003. The only single released from this album is "The Last Thing I Need Is You".

== Track listing ==
1. "Antarctica" – 4:50
2. "One" – 3:23
3. "Inhaler" – 5:57
4. "Jackie Cane" – 5:11
5. "My Autumn's Done Come" – 4:21
6. "2 Wicky" – 4:43
7. "Frosted Flake Wood" – 2:58
8. "Eden" – 3:40
9. "Vinegar & Salt" – 3:47
10. "Sad Song" – 3:24
11. "Someone" – 5:54
12. "The World Is Mine" – 2:33
13. "Sometimes" – 4:00
14. "The Last Thing I Need Is You" – 3:16

== Charts ==
=== Weekly charts ===
Chart (2003–04)	Peak position
Belgian Albums (Ultratop Flanders)	4
Belgian Albums (Ultratop Wallonia)	12
Swiss Albums (Schweizer Hitparade)	93

=== Year-end charts ===
Chart (2003)	Position
Belgian Albums (Ultratop Flanders)	31
Chart (2004)	Position
Belgian Albums (Ultratop Flanders)	90

== Certifications ==
Region	Certification	Certified units/sales
Belgium (BRMA)	Gold	25,000^{*}
^{*} Sales figures based on certification alone.
