= Noémie Wolfs =

Belgian singer (born 1988)

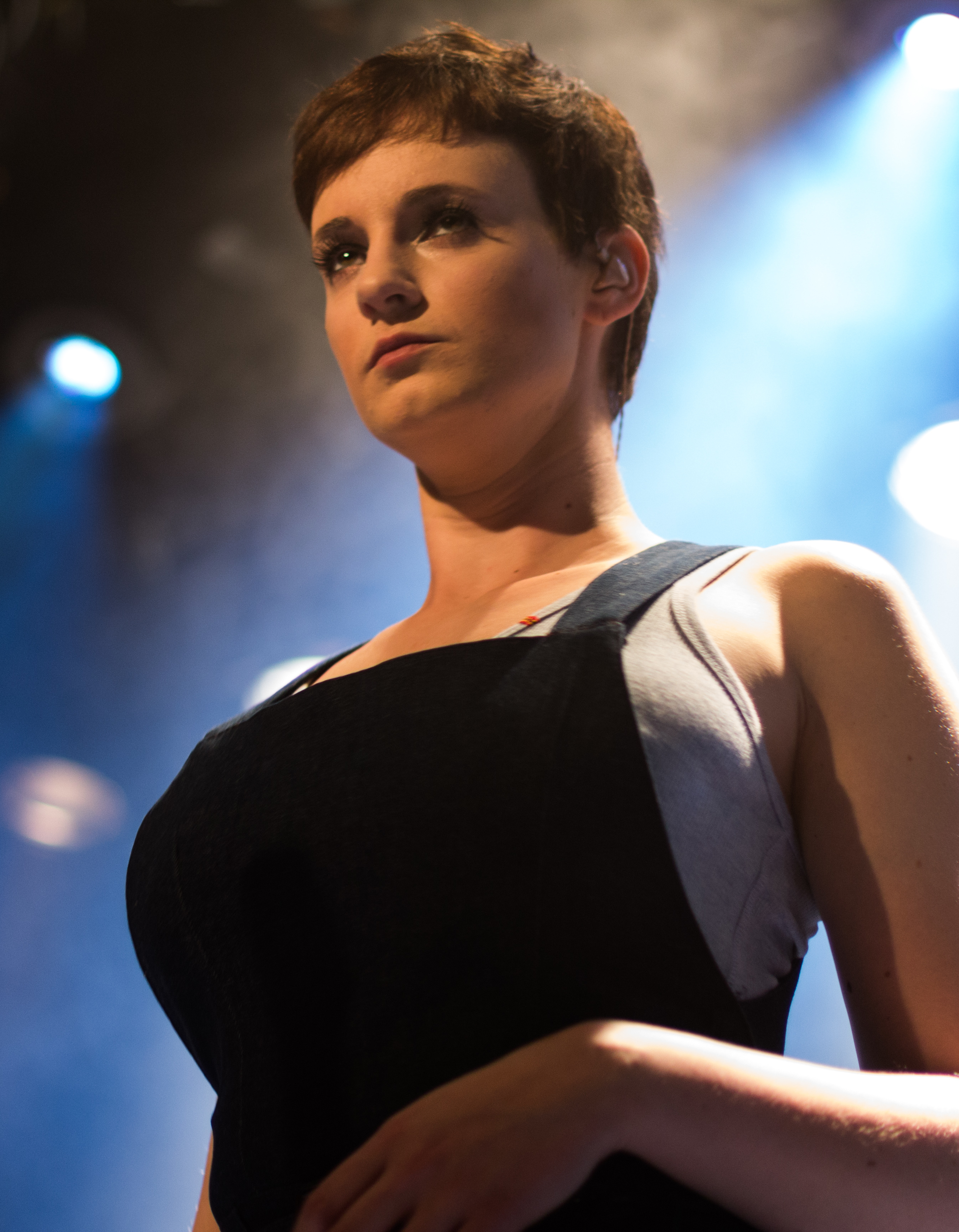
- Wolfs in 2014
- Born: 20 October 1988 (age 37)
- Education: University of Ghent
- Occupations: Singer, songwriter
- Years active: 2010–present
- Known for: Vocalist of Hooverphonic

Noémie Maria Alexis Ghislaine Wolfs (born 20 October 1988) is a Belgian singer from Scherpenheuvel-Zichem, a former member of Hooverphonic.

== Life and career ==
In her youth, Wolfs mainly listened to the records of her father, like those of Fleetwood Mac and Bob Dylan. She studied graphic design at the University of Ghent.

At the age of 22 she was selected from about a thousand candidates to replace Geike Arnaert as the singer of the group Hooverphonic in 2010. In 2011 she received the Radio 2 Summerhit 2011 for Best Singer.

In March 2015, Wolfs left Hooverphonic and signed a record deal with Universal the following autumn. On 3 March 2016, Wolfs presented her first solo single "Burning".

Wolfs is in a relationship with Simon Casier, bassist of Balthazar.

== Discography ==
=== Albums with Hooverphonic ===
- 2010: The Night Before
- 2010: Hooverphonic with Orchestra
- 2012: Hooverphonic with Orchestra Live
- 2013: Reflection

=== Solo albums ===
- 2016: Hunt You
- 2020: Lonely Boy's Paradise
- 2023: Wild at Heart

=== Singles with Hooverphonic ===
- 2010: "The Night Before"
- 2011: "Anger Never Dies"
- 2011: "One Two Three"
- 2011: "Heartbroken"
- 2012: "Happiness"
- 2012: "Unfinished Sympathy"
- 2012: "Renaissance Affair" (Version 2012)
- 2012: "George's Café" (Version 2012)
- 2013: "Harmless Shapes"
- 2013: "Amalfi"
- 2014: "Ether"
- 2014: "Boomerang"
- 2014: "Gravity"

=== Solo singles ===
- 2016: "Burning"
- 2016: "Lost In Love"
- 2016: "Hunt You"
- 2017: "Trying to Pretend"
- 2018: "Let Me Down"
- 2019: "On the Run"
- 2020: "Wake Me Up / Notorious"
- 2020: "Love Song"
- 2021: "Lonely Boy's Paradise"
- 2023: "Lonely Heart"
- 2023: "A Little Bit"
- 2023: "Moonlight"
