= Geike Arnaert =

Belgian singer

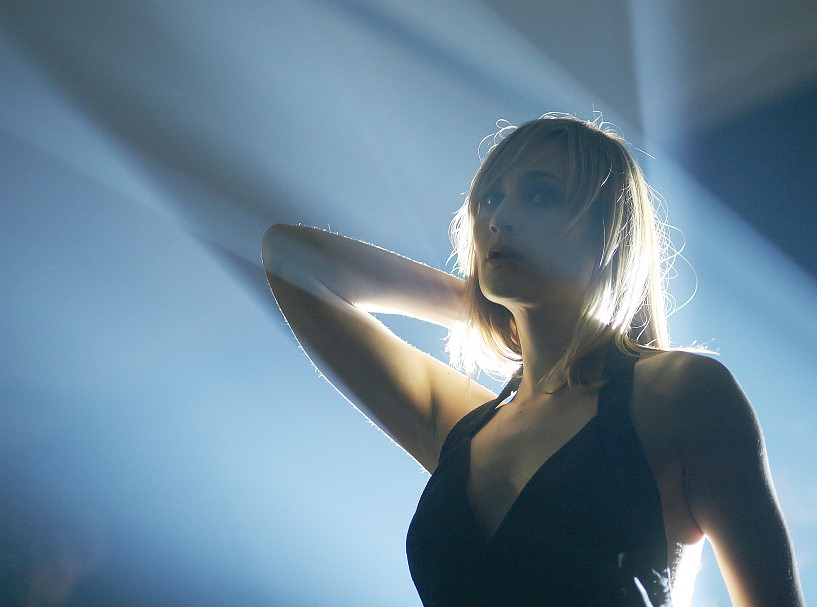
- Arnaert performing with Hooverphonic at Rewind Breendonk 2008

Background information
- Born: 13 September 1979 (age 47)
- Origin: Poperinge, Belgium
- Genre: Pop
- Occupation: Singer
- Years active: 1997–present
- Member of: Hooverphonic
- Website: www.geike.be

Geike Arnaert (Dutch pronunciation: [ˈɣɛikə ˈʔɑrnaːrt]; born 13 September 1979) is a Belgian singer, best known for being the lead vocalist of the band Hooverphonic from 1997 until 2008 and again since 2020. Geike was born in Poperinge and grew up in Westouter, a town that is close to the French border. From a young age she was captivated by music and therefore she decided to audition for the Belgian band Hooverphonic, the group of guitarist Raymond Geerts and Alex Callier.

Although Hooverphonic had been performing since the mid-90s, it wasn't until 2000 before they scored a hit in the Flemish Ultratop 50. With "Mad About You" the group spent 14 weeks in the charts, peaking at number 23. The Magnificent Tree, the album which contained "Mad About You", became an even bigger success in Belgium.

== Hooverphonic ==
According to Alex Callier, when Hooverphonic was looking for a new lead singer, he asked Arnaert, "It is almost the school break, in September you’ll be 18 years old, do you want to be our singer?". She immediately said: "Yes, that’s OK!"

After more than 10 years in the band, on 10 October 2008, Arnaert announced she would leave Hooverphonic by the end of the year to pursue her solo career. Arnaert's last concert with Hooverphonic was on 13 December of that year, in Tele-Club, Yekaterinburg, Russia. The reason to leave, as she stated in the press, was "simple and without (band) troubles. I wish other musical and artistic projects and I want to concentrate on my own music career". Three years later, however, in a comeback interview for her new solo album, she commented on her departure: "There were several reasons. As I grew older and wiser, I developed my own character and my own artistic ideas. I tried to bring that out but there were the others (Alex Callier and Raymond Geerts) who were not open to it. The roles were fixed, and mine was singing and staying silent and beautiful. I own ideas, and ten years seems long enough to go into the trip of someone else. Moreover, it was confrontational to note that men with whom I had to work and that I saw as a kind of brothers, saw me as something else. Even outside the band, I remember Mushroom of Massive Attack insisted that I contacted him. But when it turned out that I had a boyfriend, it was suddenly no longer needed. Let me also say that the humor on the tour bus was not always sophisticated and sometimes just disrespectful. Men do not understand that you are a woman sometimes feeling lonely or targeted".

In February 2016, 7 years after her last performance with the band, Arnaert performed "Mad About You" together with Hooverphonic, for a special event of Radio2 in Belgium. According to Callier, that was a "once-off" cooperation.

In November 2020, Hooverphonic announced that Arnaert would return to the band, also parting company with former lead vocalist Luka Cruysberghs. As a result, she represented Belgium, along with the rest of the band, in the Eurovision Song Contest 2021.

== Outside Hooverphonic ==
In 2010 Arnaert was brought together with Spinvis to work on the soundtrack of Breath (original title: Adem), a Belgian film about young people who suffer from mucoviscidosis. Having written more material than needed for the film, they released a record, calling themselves Dorleac for the project.

In 2011 Arnaert released her first solo album, For The Beauty of Confusion.

Arnaert recorded the historical French song "Le temps des cerises" with the legendary singer-songwriter and entertainer Bobbejaan Schoepen for his 2008 album Bobbejaan, his first album in 35 years. A music video for the song was also released.

Arnaert has also sung as a guest vocalist for various artists such as Ozark Henry, Flip Kowlier and Tom Helsen. She contributed vocals to "Mijn Leven" ("My Life"), the final single by Belgian rapper Vijvenveertig (Andy Sierens). The song was recorded two weeks before Sierens died of cancer.

In 2017 she had a Belgian number 1 hit with "Zoutelande", together with Dutch band Blof. In the Netherlands the song was a Top 3 hit.

In 2025, Arnaert provided a musical narration of the story of The Princess and the Pea for Efteling's Fairy Tale Forest attraction.

She has two sisters: Anne Arnaert and Kaat Arnaert, who has been a featured singer with the Belgian bands Sutrastore and Tommigun.

== Discography ==
=== as Geike ===
==== Albums ====
| Year | Album | Peak positions |
| Year | Album | BEL (FL) |
|---|---|---|
| 2011 | For The Beauty of Confusion | 6 |
| 2019 | Lost in Time | 3 |

=== Singles ===
| Year | Single | Peak positions | Album |
| Year | Single | BEL (FL) | Album |
|---|---|---|---|
| 2011 | "Rope Dancer" | Tip: 16 | For The Beauty of Confusion |
| 2011 | "Unlock" | Tip: 48 | For The Beauty of Confusion |
| 2011 | "Blinded" | Tip: 82 | For The Beauty of Confusion |
| 2019 | "Off Shore" | Tip: 6 | Lost in Time |
| 2019 | "Middle of the Night" | Tip: 27 | Lost in Time |
| 2019 | "All Over" | Tip: 28 | Lost in Time |
| 2019 | "Black Land Shore" | Tip: 19 | Lost in Time |
| 2021 | "We understand each other" | Tip: 41 | Love for music |

=== Featured appearances ===
| Year | Single | Peak positions | |
| Year | Single | BEL (Fl) | NLD Single Top 100 |
|---|---|---|---|
| 2008 | "Home" (Tom Helsen) | 1 | – |
| 2017 | "Zoutelande" (BLØF) | 1 | 3 |

=== with Spinvis (as Dorléac) ===
==== Studio albums ====
- 2010 — Dorléac

==== Singles ====
- 2010 — "Tommy and the Whale"

=== Featured discography ===
- "Zoutelande" — BLØF & Geike Arneart (2017)
- "Le temps des cerises" — Bobbejaan Schoepen & Geike Arnaert (2008)
- "Home" — Tom Helsen feat. Geike Arnaert (2008)
- "Bjistje In Min Uoft" — Flip Kowlier feat. Geike Arnaert (2004)
- "The Wild Rose" — Sioen & Geike Arnaert (live duet)
- "Close watch" — Live Duet with Daan
- "Mijn Leven" — Vijvenveertig feat. Geike Arnaert (2009)
- "Strange Lit Star" — Ozark Henry feat. Geike Arnaert (2002)

| Preceded by Eliot Vassamillet with "Wake Up" | Belgium in the Eurovision Song Contest (as part of Hooverphonic); 2021 | Succeeded by Jérémie Makiese with "Miss You" |
