= Hooverphonic =

Belgian band

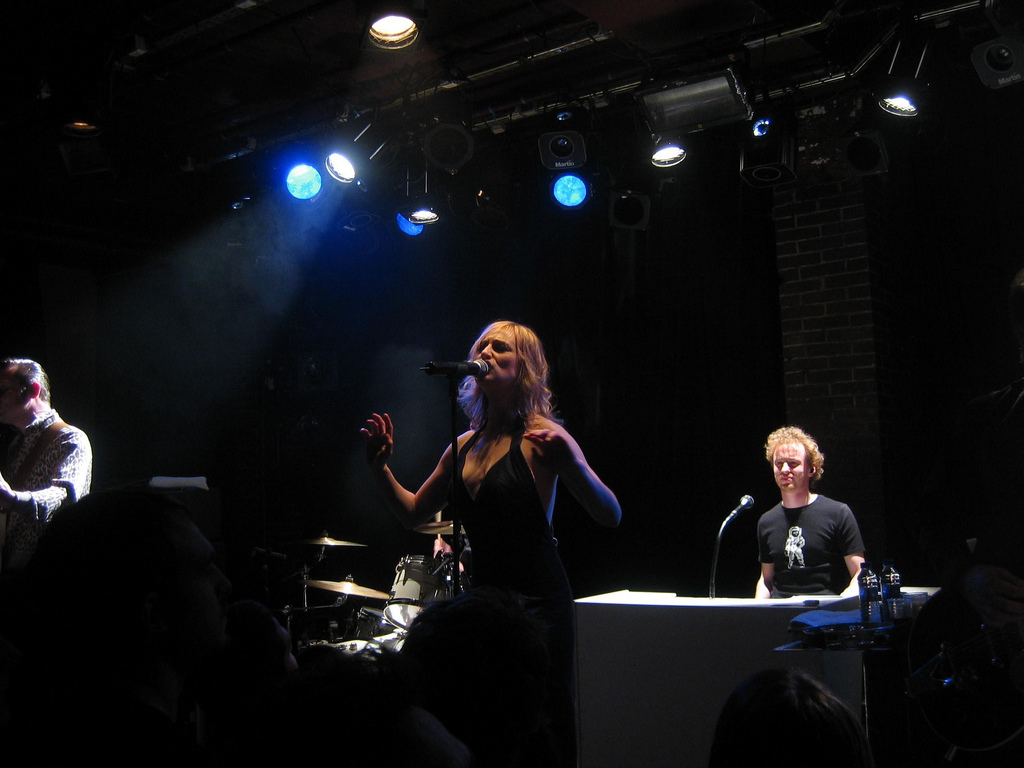
- Hooverphonic in 2008

Background information
- Also known as: Hoover (1995–1997)
- Origin: Sint-Niklaas, Belgium
- Genres: Trip hop; electronica; indie pop; alternative rock; dream pop
- Years active: 1995–present
- Labels: PIAS; Epic
- Members: Alex Callier; Noémie Wolfs
- Past members: Geike Arnaert; Raymond Geerts; Esther Lybeert; Frank Duchêne; Liesje Sadonius; Kyoko Bartsoen; Luka Cruysberghs
- Website: hooverphonic.com
- Logo

Hooverphonic is a Belgian electronic band that was formed in October 1995. Though originally categorized as a trip hop group, they quickly expanded their sound to the point where it could no longer be described as a belonging to a single genre, but rather as encompassing alternative, electronica, electropop, rock, and a mixture of others. The band was originally named Hoover, but was later renamed Hooverphonic to avoid confusion with bands already using the Hoover name.

Since their formation, Hooverphonic's lineup has consisted of bassist Alex Callier, guitarist Raymond Geerts, and various lead singers. Prominent ones included Liesje Sadonius (1996–1997), Geike Arnaert (1997–2008; 2020–2025), Noémie Wolfs (2010–2015, 2026-present), and Luka Cruysberghs (2018–2020).

The band were set to represent Belgium at the Eurovision Song Contest 2020 in Rotterdam with their song "Release Me". However, on March 18, 2020, the event was cancelled due to the COVID-19 pandemic. They instead represented Belgium in the Eurovision Song Contest 2021 with the song "The Wrong Place".

== History ==
=== A New Stereophonic Sound Spectacular ===
The original members of the group were vocalist Esther Lybeert, keyboardist Frank Duchêne, bassist Alex Callier, and guitarist Raymond Geerts. Lybeert recorded several demos with the group; however, she backed out of the band on the day they were to sign their contract with Sony Music. The band then brought in Liesje Sadonius to record the album. Sadonius left Hooverphonic on amicable terms shortly after the release of A New Stereophonic Sound Spectacular. Kyoko Baertsoen, singer for fellow Belgian trip hop band Lunascape, filled in for Sadonius for three months of a European tour in 1997 before Geike Arnaert was made the permanent singer later that year.

The band achieved international recognition through the inclusion of the Stereophonic track "2Wicky" on the soundtrack to Bernardo Bertolucci's 1996 film Stealing Beauty. "2Wicky" also appeared on the soundtracks of I Know What You Did Last Summer and Heights. The track's main riff is sampled from Isaac Hayes' recording of the 1960s hit "Walk On By".

Additional session musicians for Stereophonic include Eric Bosteels, a session drummer with Hooverphonic from 1997 to 1998 (replaced by Mario Goossens until 2005) and David Poltrock, a keyboard player with the group on and off from 1998 until 2005. In 1998, Hooverphonic also contributed to the Depeche Mode tribute album For the Masses with their cover of "Shake the Disease".

=== Blue Wonder Power Milk ===
After an extensive European tour with artists such as Massive Attack, Morcheeba, and Apollo 440, and a tour opening for Fiona Apple in the United States in 1997, the band released Blue Wonder Power Milk in 1998 with 18-year-old Arnaert on vocals. A marked departure from their debut, the album is driven less by breakbeats and samples, and more by organic string elements and traditional song structures.

The single "Club Montepulciano" was a hit in native Belgium and a minor college hit in the U.S., while "Renaissance Affair" was featured in the North American commercial campaign for the new Volkswagen Vapor Beetle. "This Strange Effect" and "Eden" were both featured in American cell phone commercials: "This Strange Effect" for the Motorola SLVR, and in 2006, "Eden" for the Cingular 8525. "Eden" was also used in the 1998 slasher film I Still Know What You Did Last Summer. At the time of their release, both songs were also featured in two separate third-season episodes of La Femme Nikita. Shortly afterwards, Sarah Brightman recorded a cover of "Eden" on her 1998 album Eden. Yoko Kanno samples the opening track "Battersea" in "Cyberbird", on the Ghost in the Shell: Stand Alone Complex O.S.T. 2.

At this point, Frank Duchêne decided to quit the band: "Having made two successful albums for Sony Music with his band Hooverphonic, and after extensive touring as support for Fiona Apple, Moloko & Massive Attack, he was unhappy with the project and near the end of 1998, decided to leave."

=== Early 2000s: The Magnificent Tree ===
The band followed up Blue Wonder Power Milk with 2000's The Magnificent Tree, which expands on the sound of Milk with a warmer, more approachable sound. Highlights from the album are the string-laden "Out of Sight", "Mad About You", and the title track.

The same year, Hooverphonic was asked to write a song specifically for the opening ceremony of the 2000 European Football Championship, which took place in Brussels, Belgium. The result was a 12-minute-long track called "Visions". Hooverphonic's performance at the opening ceremony was heard or seen by more than 1 billion people.

On the heels of Tree's success, the band became the first Belgian outfit to headline the Belgian Rock Werchter musical festival in 2001.

=== 2002: Hooverphonic Presents Jackie Cane ===
2002 saw the group shifting gears again, this time releasing the concept album Hooverphonic Presents Jackie Cane. The album tells the story of the fictional title character, a celebrity and singer catapulted into stardom at the expense of her relationship with her twin sister. Driven to the brink of insanity by the pressures of fame, Jackie quits show business and returns home to attempt reconciliation, where her sister kills them both with a poisoned last supper.

Jackie Cane retains the dreamy elements of Hooverphonic's previous works, most notably on songs "Nirvana Blue" and "Human Interest" (which contains references to "Echoes" by Pink Floyd), but tracks like "The World Is Mine" (the first single) and "Day After Day" have a clear Broadway influence and quality to them. The album went platinum in Belgium and won the group ZAMU’s Best Pop/Rock Band and Best Album awards in 2002.

=== 2003: Sit Down and Listen to Hooverphonic ===
In 2003, the band released an album performed live in a studio with an orchestra entitled Sit Down and Listen to Hooverphonic, featuring a selection of songs from the band’s body of work, as well as the new songs "Antarctica" and "The Last Thing I Need Is You", and a cover of Lee Hazlewood's "My Autumn’s Done Come". The band launched into an extended European tour in September 2003, performing in over 100 concert halls.

=== 2005: No More Sweet Music ===
The band's fifth studio album, a double CD entitled No More Sweet Music/More Sweet Music, was released in December 2005. Both CDs include the same 11 tracks, however, they are all different versions.

=== 2006: Singles '96–'06 ===
In 2006 the band left Sony/BMG, complaining of lack of label support for No More Sweet Music. A greatest hits album (Singles '96–'06) was released to end the relationship with Sony/BMG. The band went on to work without a label.

=== 2007–2008: The President of the LSD Golf Club ===
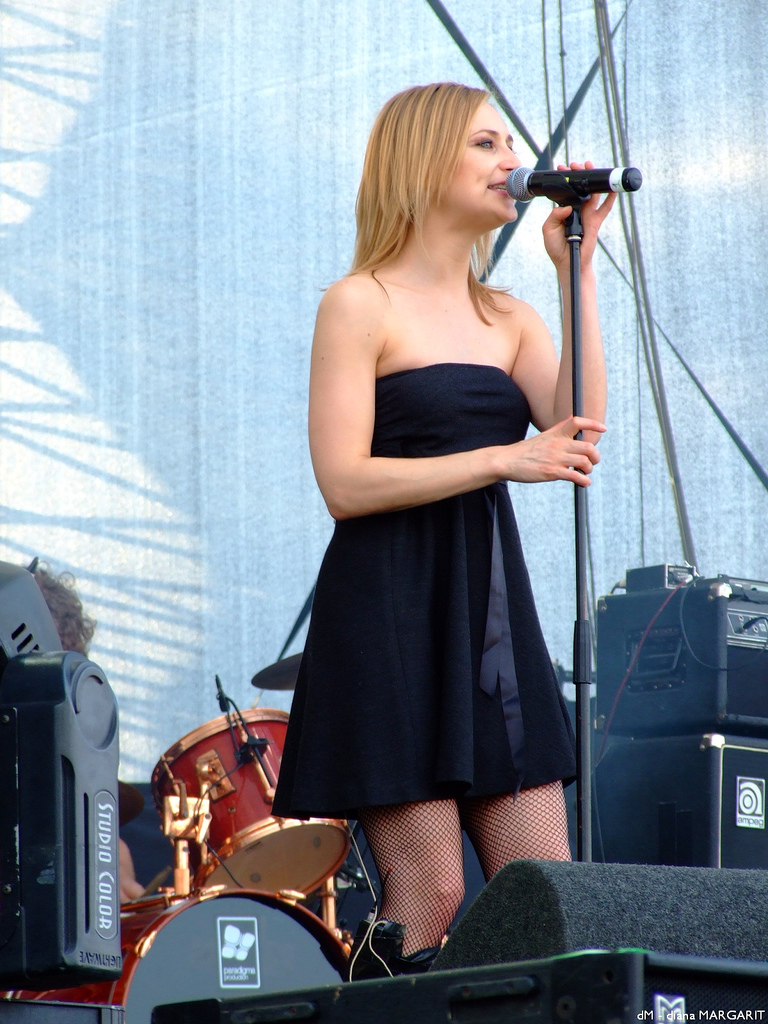
Geike Arnaert with Hooverphonic performing in Romania, 2007

In an interview for the Spanish TV program Nosolomusica, Alex Callier gave some hints of a new, more psychedelic orientation for the band's forthcoming music. During a show in Moscow (October 2007), the band revealed the first single of the new album, "Expedition Impossible".

The President of the LSD Golf Club was released in October 2007 in Belgium and the Netherlands. The album was released in the rest of Europe in March 2008. Following the release, Geike Arnaert announced on 10 October 2008 she would be leaving the band to pursue a solo career and had been working on solo material for a few months. The last concert Hooverphonic did with Geike was on 13 December 2008 in Tele-Club, Ekaterinburg, Russia. It was filmed by the local MTV station and was shown on Russian TV in 2009.

=== 2010s: The Night Before, With Orchestra, Reflection and In Wonderland ===
On 4 November 2010, the new lead singer Noémie Wolfs was announced on De Laatste Show at the VRT, the Flemish public broadcasting organization.

On 29 October 2010, Hooverphonic announced a new single on their website. The videoclip showcased fourteen possible singers but only Wolfs proved to be the real successor to Geike Arnaert. The single "The Night Before" introduced the new singer and was followed on 26 November by the release of the full-length album The Night Before. The album went platinum in Belgium soon after its release.

On 9 November 2011 they announced the re-release of their first album, A New Stereophonic Sound Spectacular.

Three more albums were released in the following years featuring Wolfs as main vocalist: the orchestral album With Orchestra and the live album With Orchestra Live in 2012, and the studio album Reflection in 2013. With Orchestra Live features orchestral renditions of songs spanning the Hooverphonic entire career performed live at the Koningin Elisabethzaal in Antwerp. The performance was also released on DVD. In 2016, all the songs from the concert were uploaded on the band's official YouTube channel in high definition. With more than 100 million views, the "Mad About You" performance is the most watched video of Hooverphonic.

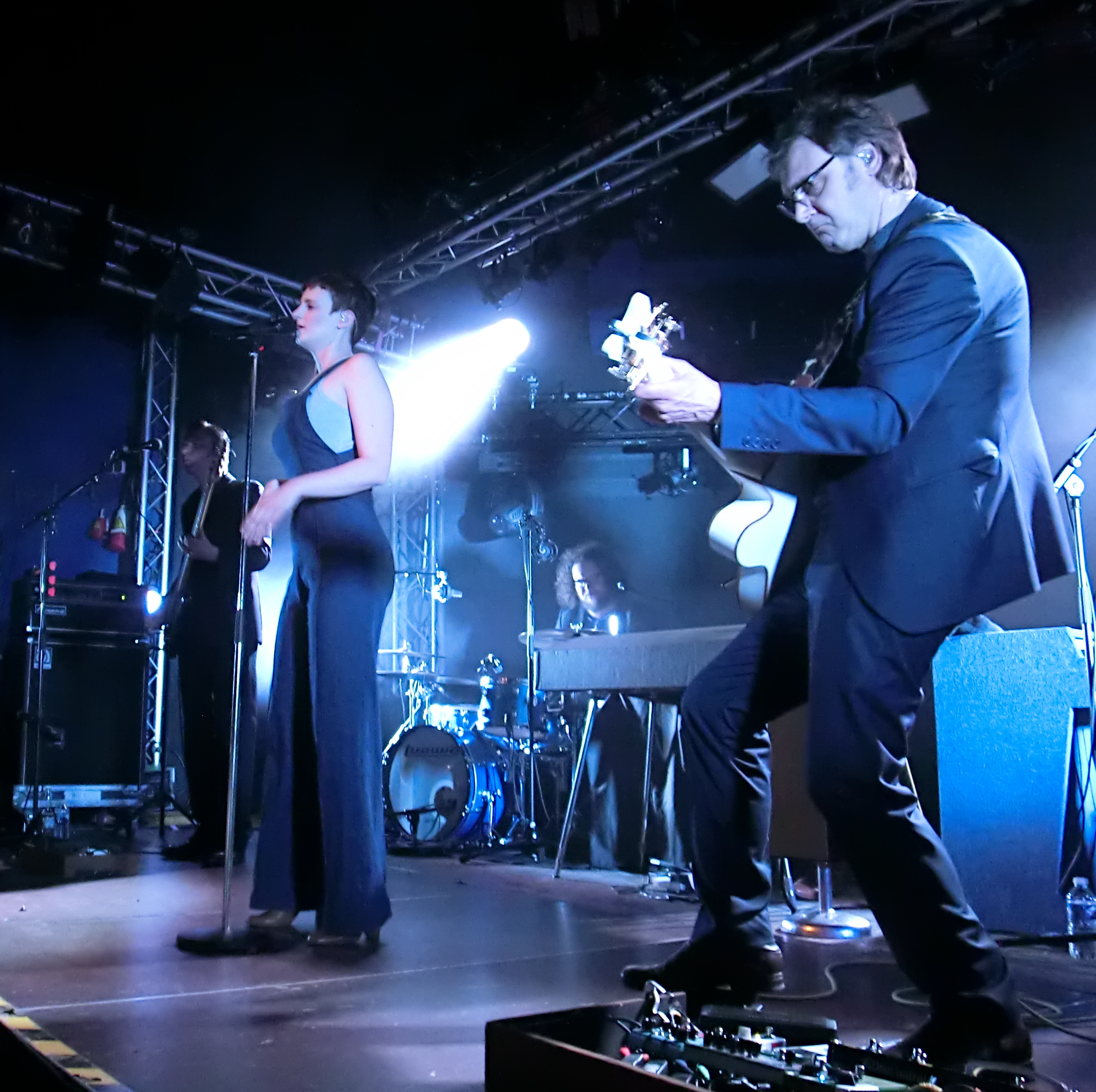
Hooverphonic with singer Noémie Wolfs in 2014

On 26 March 2015, Hooverphonic announced that Wolfs would be leaving the band "in mutual agreement". The band's ninth studio album, In Wonderland (2016), featured vocals from Janie Price, Emilie Satt, Litlo Tinz, Christa Jérôme, Tjeerd Bomhof and Felix Howard. Anton Marin, of the design agency Power & Glory, who had been the band's official house illustrator and designer since their debut, released a special comic strip based on the lyrics of Hooverphonic's hit single Badaboum.

=== 2020s: Looking For Stars, Eurovision Song Contest and Geike Arnaert’s return ===
In April 2018, Hooverphonic introduced their new singer Luka Cruysberghs. Cruysberghs provided vocals for the band's tenth studio album Looking For Stars, anticipated by the single "Romantic".

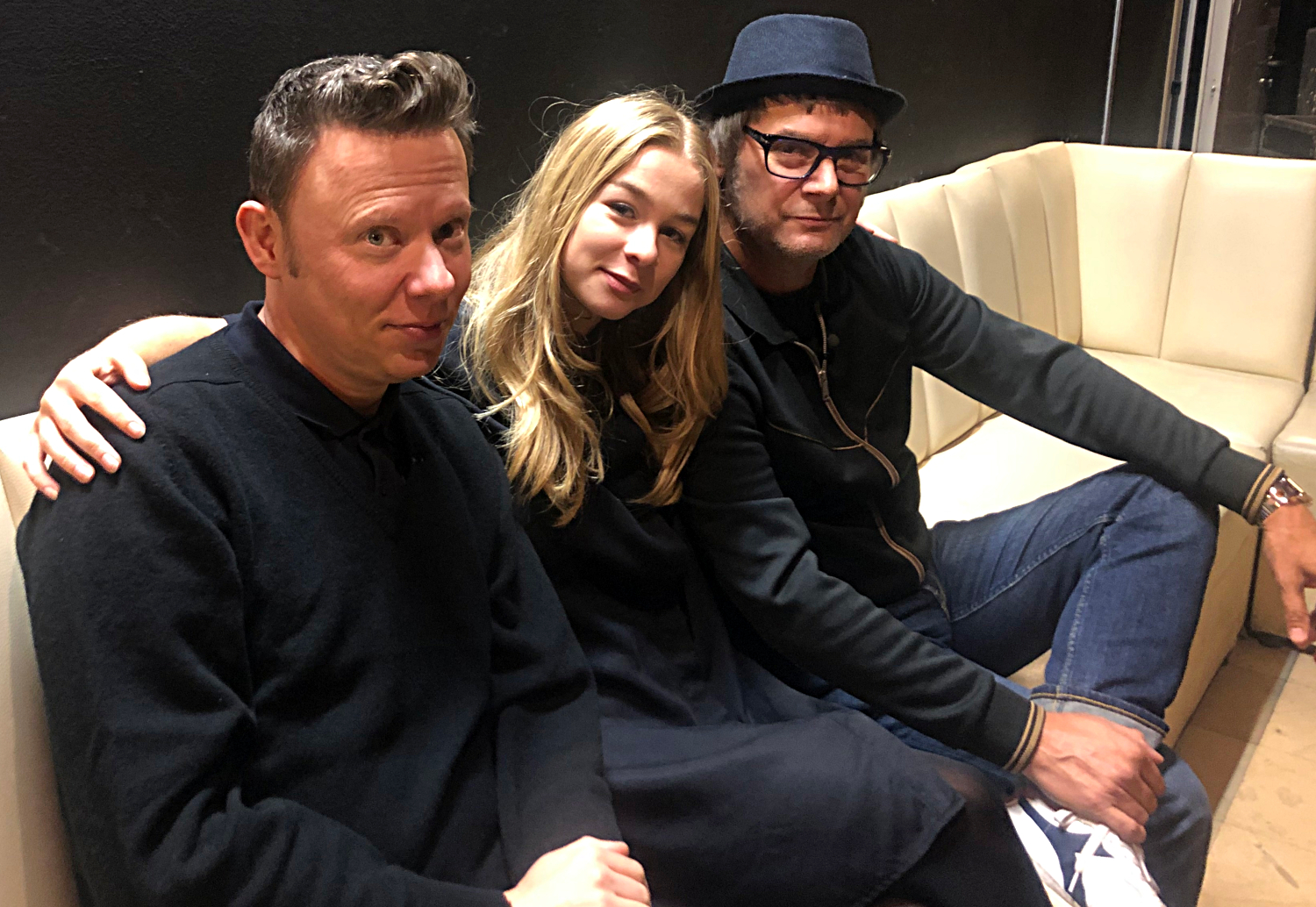
The band in 2019, from left: Alex Callier, Luka Cruysberghs, Raymond Geerts

Hooverphonic were supposed to represent Belgium at the Eurovision Song Contest 2020 in Rotterdam with their song "Release Me". The event was cancelled because of the COVID-19 pandemic. Hooverphonic was the only Eurovision entrant for 2020 who refused to take part in the "Love Shine a Light" performance, where entrants each contributed sections of the song, although a photograph of Cruysberghs was included with the other participants making a hand heart at the end.

On 9 November 2020, Cruysberghs was fired from the band to make way for the return of Geike Arnaert. Also on the same day, they released a new version of "Mad About You" for the song's 20th anniversary.

They participated at the Eurovision Song Contest 2021 with the song "The Wrong Place". They finished the contest in 19th place with 74 points.

In May 2021, the band released their eleventh studio album overall and sixth to feature Arnaert as vocalist, Hidden Stories. The album featured the singles The Wrong Place, Thinking About You, Lift Me Up and Belgium In The Rain. Like The Wrong Place, the album went to #1 in the charts.

Brussels Airlines, Belgium's flag carrier, commissioned the band to write and record a song using the airline's standard safety instructions as lyrics and then film a music video of it, to be shown to passengers before takeoff on long-haul flights. The video's surreal take on the instructions is complemented by visual allusions to the work of Belgian artist René Magritte. In August 2022 the band debuted the song and video in a short set at one of the gates at Brussels Airport, along with two of their own songs. "I really thought it would be impossible", Callier said. "But at the same time, I love that kind of challenge and we went for it." The video will be shown through the end of 2025.

On 21 March 2024, Hooverphonic released the album Fake Is The New Dope, preceded by the singles Don't Think (2023), Por Favor (2023), Then I Found You (2023), the title track (2024) and The Best Day Of Our Life (2024). Belgian newspaper De Standaard headlined: Hooverphonic surprises with introspective new album. It went to #4 in the album charts. The album was listed on entertainment website Culture Fix as one of their best albums of 2024, highlighting the album "skilfully blends enigmatic pop hooks with trippier experimental sound."

== Band members ==
Current members

- Alex Callier — bass guitar, keyboards, programming (1995–present)
- Noémie Wolfs — lead vocals (2010–2015; 2026–present)

Former members

- Geike Arnaert — lead vocals (1997–2008; 2020–2026)
- Raymond Geerts — lead guitar (1995–2026)
- Esther Lybeert — lead vocals (1995–1996)
- Frank Duchêne — keyboards (1995–1998)
- Liesje Sadonius — lead vocals (1996–1997)
- Kyoko Baertsoen — lead vocals (1997)
- Luka Cruysberghs — lead vocals (2018–2020)

== Discography ==
- A New Stereophonic Sound Spectacular (1996)
- Blue Wonder Power Milk (1998)
- The Magnificent Tree (2000)
- Hooverphonic Presents Jackie Cane (2002)
- No More Sweet Music/More Sweet Music (2005)
- The President of the LSD Golf Club (2007)
- The Night Before (2010)
- Reflection (2013)
- In Wonderland (2016)
- Looking for Stars (2018)
- Hidden Stories (2021)
- Fake Is the New Dope (2024)

== Use of music in television and movies ==
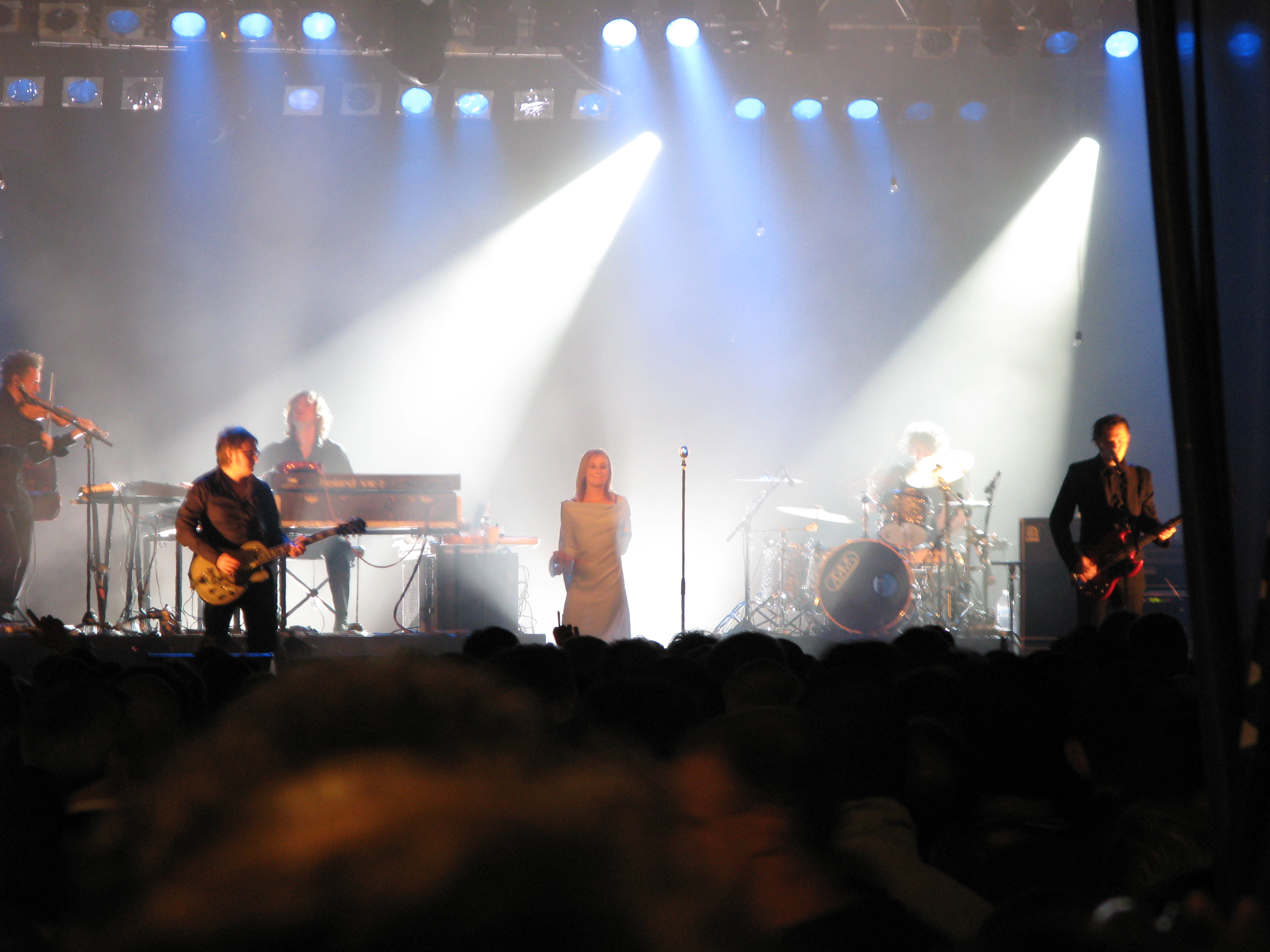
Fête Iris in Brussels' Grand Place, 2007

Hooverphonic's music has also appeared in a number of commercials and other TV series:

- "2Wicky" has appeared in numerous movies, including I Know What You Did Last Summer, Permanent Midnight, The Interview, Bernardo Bertolucci's Stealing Beauty, as well as an episode of Entourage. "2Wicky" and "Inhaler" were also featured on episodes of CSI: Crime Scene Investigation and are also on the series soundtrack.
- "Eden" is included on the soundtrack of the film I Still Know What You Did Last Summer and in episode 10 of season three of the series La Femme Nikita.
- "Renaissance Affair" and "This Strange Effect" were used in the Belgian movie Shades, as was "Shades" (the theme composed for the film). Alex Callier worked as the composer for the movie. "Renaissance Affair" was also used in the US in a Volkswagen New Beetle TV ad circa 2000. "This Strange Effect" was also used in the 20th episode of La Femme Nikita.
- "Battersea" was used in the 1999 pilot of the NBC TV series Third Watch and in the end of the show's last episode ("Goodbye to Camelot"), in 2005.
- "Mad About You" was used in the CBS TV series Cold Case, in the third-season episode "Sanctuary". The song was also featured in the film A Lot Like Love during the New Year's Eve sequence, in the 2002 film New Best Friend, and in Driven. Netflix also used this song in The Umbrella Academy season 1, episode 8 titled "I Heard a Rumor". The song was also used as a lip sync song on season 2 of Drag Race Belgique.
- "The World is Mine" was featured as the theme song of the UK television series Mile High (2003–2005), which follows the lives of an airline crew at the fictional UK airline "Fresh!".

Preceded by Eliot Vassamillet with "Wake Up"	Belgium in the Eurovision Song Contest; 2020 (cancelled)	Succeeded by Themselves with "The Wrong Place"
Preceded by Themselves with "Release Me"	Belgium in the Eurovision Song Contest; 2021	Succeeded by Jérémie Makiese with "Miss You"
