= Wake Up (Eliot song) =

2019 song by Eliot Vassamillet

Single by Eliot Vassamillet
- Released: 2019
- Length: 2:59
- Label: Sony Music
- Songwriters: Pierre Dumoulin; Eliot Vassamillet
- Producer: Pierre Dumoulin

Eurovision Song Contest 2019 entry
- Country: Belgium
- Artist: Eliot Vassamillet
- Language: English
- Composers: Pierre Dumoulin; Eliot Vassamillet
- Lyricists: Pierre Dumoulin; Eliot Vassamillet

Finals performance
- Semi-final result: 13th
- Semi-final points: 70

Entry chronology
- ◄ "A Matter of Time" (2018)
- "Release Me" (2020) ►

"Wake Up" is a song by Belgian singer Eliot Vassamillet. The song represented Belgium in the Eurovision Song Contest 2019 in Tel Aviv, where it was performed during the first semi-final but did not qualify for the final. The song was released on 28 February 2019.

== Eurovision Song Contest ==
The song was selected to represent Belgium in the Eurovision Song Contest 2019 after Eliot Vassamillet was internally selected by the Belgian broadcaster. On 28 January 2019, a special allocation draw was held which placed each country into one of the two semi-finals, as well as which half of the show they would perform in. Belgium was placed into the first semi-final, to be held on 14 May 2019, and was scheduled to perform in the second half of the show. Once all the competing songs for the 2019 contest had been released, the running order for the semi-finals was decided by the show's producers rather than through another draw, so that similar songs were not placed next to each other. Belgium performed in position 10. However, the song failed to qualify for the grand final.

== Charts ==
Chart (2019)	Peak position
Belgium (Ultratop 50 Flanders)	35
Belgium (Ultratop 50 Wallonia)	27
Lithuania (AGATA)	77
