= Alex Callier =

Belgian musician (born 1972)

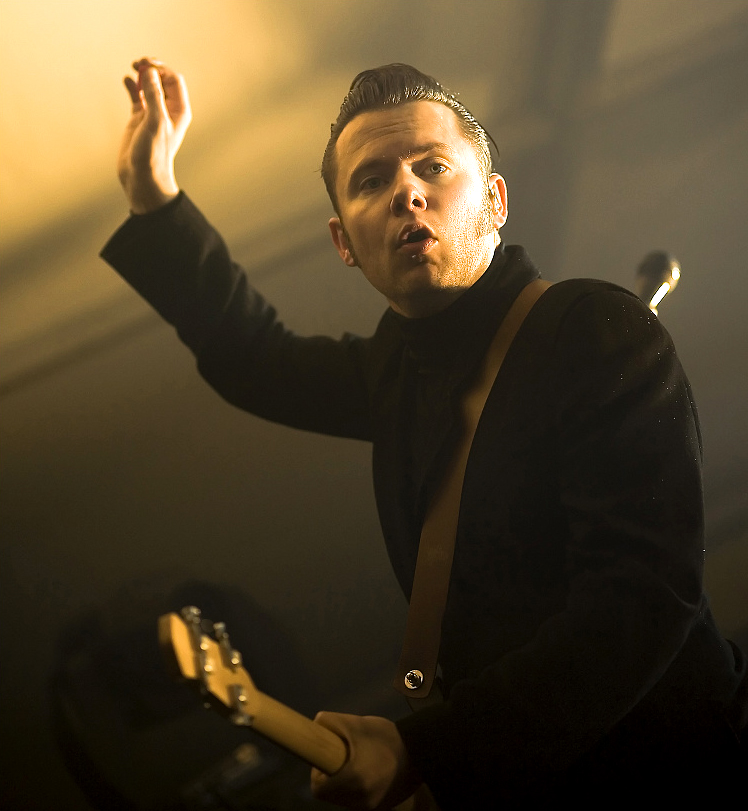
- Callier in 2008
- Born: December 6, 1972 (age 53); Sint-Niklaas, Belgium
- Education: RITCS
- Notable work: Hooverphonic
- Style: Trip hop, electronica, indie pop, dream pop

Alex Callier (born 6 December 1972, in Sint-Niklaas, Belgium) is a Belgian musician and songwriter who is a member of the Belgian band Hooverphonic.

== Biography ==
Callier studied image, sound and editing at RITCS between 1990 and 1993. After his studies he worked as a sound engineer for the public Flemish broadcaster VRT. In 1995 he co-founded Hoover (later Hooverphonic), where he is active as a musician, as well as a composer and producer. In 1999 he wrote the music for the Belgian film Shades. In 2000 he received the ZAMU Award for Best Belgian producer.

In 2009, he launched his solo project Hairglow. In 2018, he co-wrote a Matter of Time, the song Sennek used to enter the Eurovision Song Contest.

== ACTA treaty ==
Alex Callier was in favour of the now rejected ACTA treaty. He defended this proposal to restrict the internet, among other things, in the European Parliament.

| Preceded by Eliot Vassamillet with "Wake Up" | Belgium in the Eurovision Song Contest (as part of Hooverphonic); 2020 (cancelled); 2021 | Succeeded by Jérémie Makiese |
