= Loïc Nottet discography =

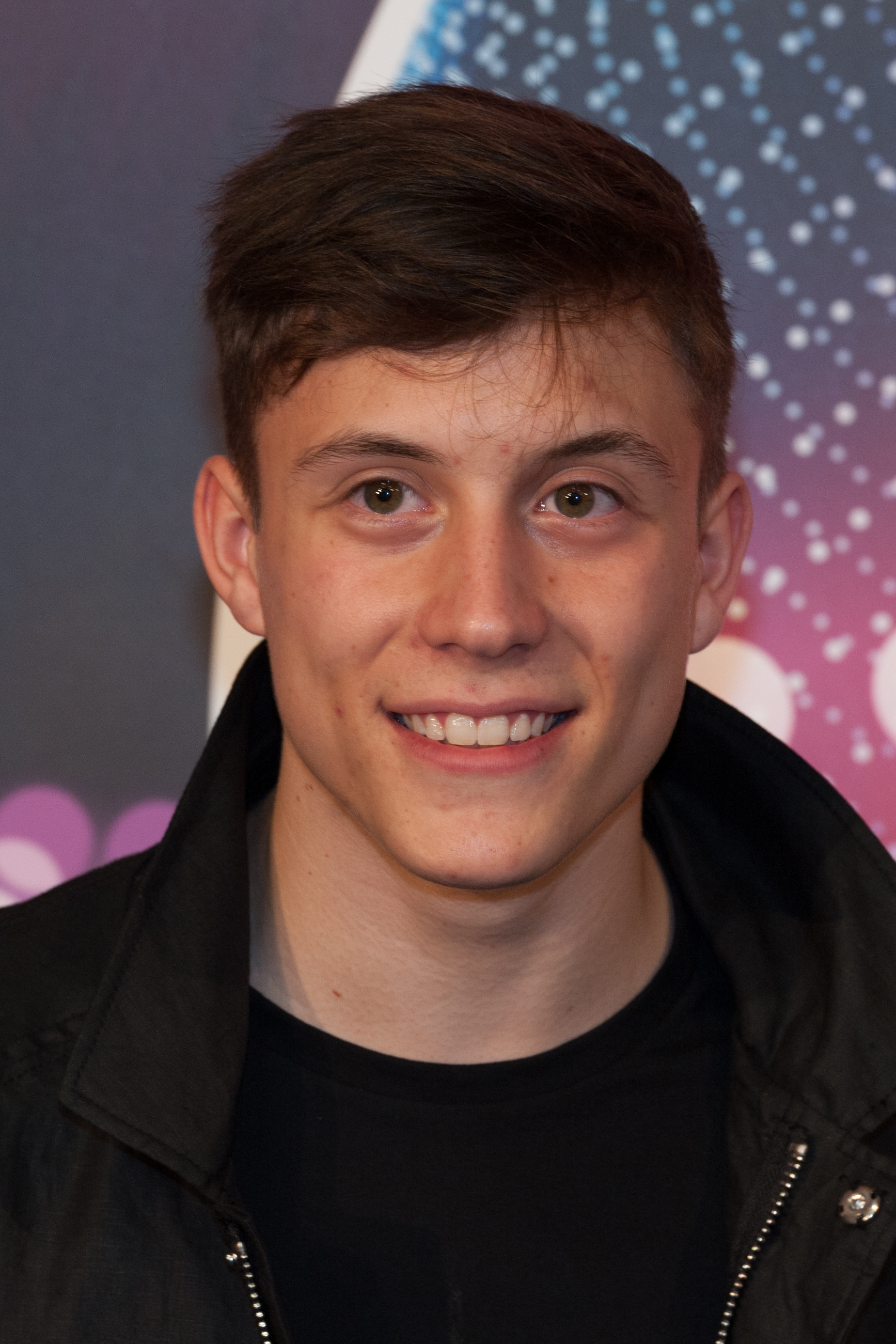
- Studio albums: 3
- EPs: 1
- Singles: 15

This is the discography of Belgian singer, songwriter and dancer Loïc Nottet.

== Studio albums ==
List of studio albums, with selected details, chart positions, sales figures and certifications
| Title | Details | Peak chart positions | | | | | Sales | Certifications |
| Title | Details | BEL (FL) | BEL (WA) | FRA | SWI | SWI (ROM) | Sales | Certifications |
|---|---|---|---|---|---|---|---|---|
| Selfocracy | Released: 31 March 2017; Label: Sony Music; Format: CD, LP, digital download, streaming | 3 | 1 | 6 | 20 | 5 | FRA: 25,000 | BEA: Platinum; SNEP: Gold |
| Sillygomania | Released: 29 May 2020; Label: Sony Music; Format: CD, digital download, streaming | 9 | 1 | 31 | 50 | — | | |
| Addictocrate | Released: 26 May 2023; Label: Sony Music; Format: CD, digital download, streaming | 107 | 1 | 33 | — | — | | |
"—" denotes a recording that did not chart or was not released in that territory.

== Extended plays ==
List of extended plays, with selected details
| Title | Details |
|---|---|
| Candy | Released: 31 October 2019; Label: Sony; Format: Digital download |

== Singles ==
List of singles as lead artist, with selected chart positions and certifications, showing year released and album name
| Title | Year | Peak chart positions | | | | | | | | | | Certifications | Album |
| Title | Year | BEL (FL) | BEL (WA) | AUS | AUT | FRA | GER | NLD | SWE | SWI | UK | Certifications | Album |
|---|---|---|---|---|---|---|---|---|---|---|---|---|---|
| "Rhythm Inside" | 2015 | 1 | 1 | 61 | 2 | 85 | 21 | 26 | 12 | 34 | 69 | BEA: Platinum | Non-album single |
| "Million Eyes" | 2016 | 23 | 2 | — | — | 5 | — | — | — | 43 | — | BEA: Gold; SNEP: Diamond | Selfocracy |
| "Mud Blood" | 2017 | — (Note: "Mud Blood" did not reach the region's Ultratop 50 chart, but charted at number one on the Ultratip Bubbling Under ranking.) | 17 | — | — | — | — | — | — | — | — | | Selfocracy |
| "Doctor" | 2017 | — | — (Note: "Doctor" did not reach the region's Ultratop 50 chart, but charted at number 12 on the Ultratip Bubbling Under ranking.) | — | — | — | — | — | — | — | — | | Sillygomania |
| "Go to Sleep" | 2017 | — (Note: "Go to Sleep" did not reach the region's Ultratop 50 chart, but was registered on the Ultratip Bubbling Under ranking.) | — (Note: "Go to Sleep" did not reach the region's Ultratop 50 chart, but charted at number 13 on the Ultratip Bubbling Under ranking.) | — | — | — | — | — | — | — | — | | Non-album single |
| "On Fire" | 2018 | — (Note: "On Fire" did not reach the region's Ultratop 50 chart, but charted at number eight on the Ultratip Bubbling Under ranking.) | 10 | — | — | — | — | — | — | — | — | | Sillygomania |
| "29" | 2019 | — (Note: "29" did not reach the region's Ultratop 50 chart, but charted at number 35 on the Ultratip Bubbling Under ranking.) | 42 | — | — | — | — | — | — | — | — | | Sillygomania |
| "Heartbreaker" | 2020 | 14 | 5 | — | — | — | — | — | — | — | — | BEA: Gold | Sillygomania |
| "Mr/Mme" | 2020 | — | — (Note: "Mr/Mme" did not reach the region's Ultratop 50 chart, but charted at number seven on the Ultratip Bubbling Under ranking.) | — | — | — | — | — | — | — | — | | Sillygomania |
| "TWYM" | 2020 | — (Note: "TWYM" did not reach the region's Ultratop 50 chart, but charted at number 17 on the Ultratip Bubbling Under ranking.) | 8 | — | — | — | — | — | — | — | — | | Sillygomania |
| "Strangers" (with Laura Tesoro featuring Alex Germys) | 2020 | 13 | 4 | — | — | — | — | — | — | — | — | BEA: Gold | Non-album singles |
| "Start It from the End" (with BJ Scott and Woodie Smalls) | 2021 | — | — | — | — | — | — | — | — | — | — | | Non-album singles |
| "Mélodrame" | 2022 | — | 33 | — | — | — | — | — | — | — | — | | Addictocrate |
| "Danser" | 2023 | — | 3 | — | — | — | — | — | — | — | — | | Addictocrate |
| "Addictocrate" | 2023 | — | — | — | — | — | — | — | — | — | — | | Addictocrate |
| "Beaux rêves" (featuring Prinzly) | 2023 | — | 18 | — | — | — | — | — | — | — | — | | Non-album singles |
| "On s'écrira" (with Nuit Incolore) | 2024 | — | 49 | — | — | — | — | — | — | — | — | | Non-album singles |
| "Crash" | 2026 | — | 33 | — | — | — | — | — | — | — | — | | Non-album singles |
"—" denotes a recording that did not chart or was not released in that territory.

=== Promotional singles ===
List of songs, showing year released and album name
| Title | Year | Album |
|---|---|---|
| "Je t'haine" | 2023 | Addictocrate |

== Other charted songs ==
List of songs, with selected chart positions, showing year released and album name
| Title | Year | Peak chart positions | | Album |
| Title | Year | BEL (FL) | BEL (WA) | Album |
|---|---|---|---|---|
| "Hungry Heart" | 2017 | — (Note: "Hungry Heart" did not reach the Ultratop 50 chart, but charted at number 24 on the Ultratip Bubbling Under ranking.) | 47 | Selfocracy |
| "Candy" | 2019 | — | — (Note: "Candy" did not reach the region's Ultratop 50 chart, but charted at number nine on the Ultratip Bubbling Under ranking.) | Candy |
"—" denotes a recording that did not chart or was not released in that territory.

== Songwriting credits ==
- Louane – "No" (2017)
