= On Fire (Loïc Nottet song) =

Single by Loïc Nottet

from the album Sillygomania
- Released: 30 November 2018
- Genre: Electropop
- Length: 3:47
- Label: Sony
- Songwriters: Nottet; Sacha Skarbek
- Producer: Skydancers

Loïc Nottet singles chronology
"Go to Sleep" (2017)	"On Fire" (2018)	"29" (2019)

"On Fire" is a song recorded by Belgian singer Loïc Nottet, and released for digital download on 30 November 2018 by Sony Music Entertainment as the second single from his second studio album Sillygomania. It was written by Nottet along with Sacha Skarbek, while production was handled by Skydancers. Musically, "On Fire" is a midtempo, urban-inspired electropop song similar to Nottet's past work. Its lyrics are directed at the criticism the singer had received during his career, and discuss topics such as worthlessness, perseverance and rebirth. Four personalities are reflected on the track, as Nottet wanted to personify the moods he was in while composing the song.

Upon its release, "On Fire" received praise from one music critic for Nottet's vocal delivery and the lyrical content, while others likened the single to the singer's debut studio album Selfocracy (2017) and to the music of Sia. An accompanying music video for "On Fire" was uploaded onto Nottet's YouTube channel on 7 December 2018 and was directed by Skarbek. Featuring a message of courage and strength, it depicts Nottet encountering a faux dragon and eventually managing to tame it. For further promotion, the singer delivered multiple live performances of "On Fire" on several radio stations. It commercially experienced moderate success in Belgium's Wallonia and Flanders regions.

== Background and composition ==
"On Fire"
A 25-second sample of "On Fire", a midtempo and urban-inspired electropop song reminiscent of Nottet's past work.

After conducting his Selfocracy Tour (2017–2018) in support of his debut studio album Selfocracy (2017), Loïc Nottet took a nearly one-year hiatus in order to work on material for his second record. "On Fire", the first single from the project, was made available for digital download on 30 November 2018 by Sony Music Entertainment. It was written by Nottet along with Sacha Skarbek, while Skydancers handled the production. Laurent Wilthien, Matthieu Tosi and Jean Noël Wilthien played electric guitar and keyboards; the latter also provided percussion. Nottet and Skarbek had scheduled a songwriting session in London, where the singer arrived with already written sentences and text. Together, the two "rebuilt everything stone by stone".

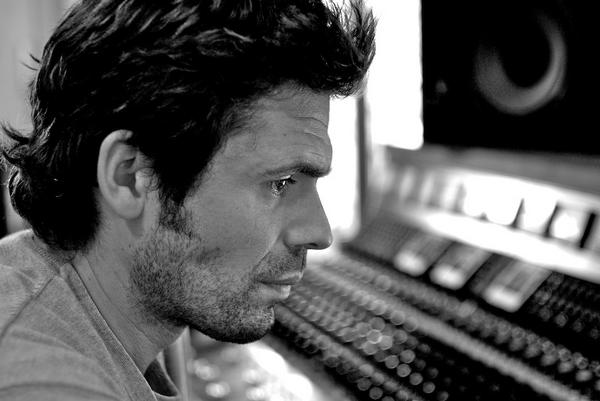
Sacha Skarbek (pictured) co-wrote "On Fire" with Nottet.

Lyrically, "On Fire" reflects four personalities, "the charmer, the child, the clown and the lonely melancholy", as Nottet wanted to personify the moods he was in while composing the song. During its first verse, Nottet discusses the emotions of a little boy "too different to belong, too lonely to be strong", while in the second one he switches to a little girl "from a broken family with a silent fantasy". The singer explores themes of worthlessness as he sings, "he said that falling down, it wouldn’t make a sound". Lyrics from the track's refrain include: "I'm burnin' I'm on fire/Here I am, inside the flames/I don't care anymore, don't need your oxygen/I'm burning in a new way/Here I am, taming the flames/Not afraid anymore/Strong like a warrior". Alongside rebirth, Nottet also discusses perseverance, eventually asserting that he will "get back up" and "light up like a flare". "On Fire" is directed at the criticism the singer had received throughout his career.

Nouma Foé, an editor of Chérie FM, interpreted the lyrics of "On Fire" differently: "[They] tell the story of a man abandoned by a woman, who decides to dive straight ahead in hell, and ends up losing himself because he lost the love of his life." Musically, the song follows the path of Nottet's past work, incorporating "electronic flourishes and adventurous instrumentation". Starting with a "peaceful" instrumental sequence, "On Fire" has been described as a midtempo, urban-inspired electropop song. In an interview, Nottet revealed that he wanted to create a pop recording that still differed from the material on Selfocracy.

== Reception ==
Jonathan Currinn of CelebMix praised Nottet's "near-perfect" and emotional vocal delivery in "On Fire", while also commending the lyrical content. PureMédias's Yohann Ruelle likened the urban influences in the song to those presented in "Doctor" (2017), while Julien Goncalves of the same publication noticed similarities between "On Fire" and the music of Australian singer Sia. Antranig Shokayan, writing for Wiwibloggs, likened the lyrical message of "On Fire" to the themes explored on Nottet's Selfocracy, particularly to "Million Eyes" (2016). Commercially, "On Fire" reached number ten in Wallonia and number eight on the Flemish Ultratip, an extension to the main Ultratop ranking. It was nominated in the Hit of the Year category at the 2020 D6bels Music Awards.

== Promotion ==
A shot from the music video's ending scene. It depicts Nottet putting his hand over the jaws of a faux dragon, taming him.

Nottet performed "On Fire" several times. He first appeared on Radio Contact on 6 December 2018 to sing the track, and the following day on MNM, Madmoizelle Music, and NRJ Belgium. Later that month, Nottet also performed "On Fire" on Virgin Radio. An accompanying music video directed by Skarbek was uploaded onto Nottet's YouTube channel on 7 December 2018, and was teased through a series of 87 images on his Instagram, forming a comic based on the clip's plot. It takes place in what was described by a reviewer as an "imaginary and rather strange world"; Nottet pointed out the use of several colors and handmade decoration to achieve this aesthetic. For the music video, the singer changed his hair color to blonde, saying: "I just wanted to change, [...] to have a new look for a new project in my personal career."

The visual starts with Nottet and fellow background dancers walking through a hallway filled with balloons, which leads to a room decorated with silver material. They perform choreography as four people wearing black suits enter the room, carrying a faux dragon which blows fire at them. Nottet and his dancers collapse to the ground, but after performing another set of choreography around the faux dragon, the singer reaches for it and puts his right hand over its jaws. Lola Maroni of Purebreak called the video "hyper artistic" and wrote that it moved away from the reality presented in Nottet's past work to focus more on the fictitious. In an interview, the singer labelled it a risky release due to the difference to his other videos, recalling that "it either works or it breaks." He elaborated on the clip's message:

"The clip [...] features a dragon that [each character has] to face. At the end of the video, I finally manage to tame it. For me, this dragon symbolizes the problems that I had to face in my life. The dragon causes fear, which makes it difficult to approach. This is often the case in real life with our problems. But we see at the end of the clip that I become friends with the dragon. It simply means that you have to face your problems. Go beyond the fear they cause. [It] represents a message of courage and strength."

== Credits and personnel ==
Credits adapted from Hung Medien and YouTube.

- Loïc Nottet – lead vocals, songwriter
- Max von Ameln – recording engineer
- Jukka Jahnukainen – recording engineer
- Ken Lewis – mixing engineer
- Randy Merrill – mastering engineer
- Sacha Skarbek – songwriter
- Skydancers – producer, recording engineer
- Matthieu Tosi – electric guitar, keyboards, programmer
- Jean Noël Wilthien – electric guitar, keyboards, programmer, percussion
- Laurent Wilthien – electric guitar, keyboards, programmer

== Charts ==
=== Weekly charts ===
Chart (2018–19)	Peak position
Belgium (Ultratip Bubbling Under Flanders)	8
Belgium (Ultratop 50 Wallonia)	10

=== Year-end charts ===
Chart (2019)	Position
Belgium (Ultratop Wallonia)	42

== Release history ==
Territory	Date	Format(s)	Label
Various	30 November 2018	Digital download	Sony
