= Doctor (Loïc Nottet song) =

Single by Loïc Nottet

from the album Sillygomania
- Released: 30 October 2017
- Genre: Dark pop Halloween music
- Length: 3:58
- Label: Sony
- Songwriters: Amy Morrey; Loïc Nottet
- Producers: Ozhora Miyagi; Twenty 9

Loïc Nottet singles chronology
"Mud Blood" (2017)	"Doctor" (2017)	"Go to Sleep" (2017)

"Doctor" is a song recorded by Belgian singer Loïc Nottet, released on 30 October 2017 by Sony Music Entertainment as the lead single from his second studio album Sillygomania. It was written by Amy Morrey and Nottet, while production was handled by Ozhora Miyagi and Twenty 9. Released to celebrate Halloween, "Doctor" has been described as a hip hop-influenced dark pop song featuring bass synthesizers and bells in its instrumentation. Lyrically, Nottet details on a toxic relationship that resulted in him committing criminal offences. The song—inspired by Nottet's love of horror films—also features the singer vocally portraying a character that descends into madness.

Selected music critics gave positive reviews of "Doctor" upon its release, praising its unicity, production and Nottet's vocal delivery. An accompanying music video was uploaded onto the singer's official YouTube channel simultaneously with the track's release. Directed by Leander Hanssen Jr, it features Nottet as an evil clown walking on the streets of a town at night alongside a woman; they commit several offences to fellow people. Reviewers generally praised the visual. It was also nominated for Best Video at the 2017 D6bels Music Awards. Promoted by live performances during Nottet's Selfocracy Tour (2017-2018), "Doctor" peaked at number 12 on Wallonia's Ultratip chart.

== Background and composition ==
"Doctor"
A 28-second sample of "Doctor", a hip hop-inspired dark pop song prominently including bass synthesizers and bells in its instrumentation.

"Doctor" was written by Amy Morrey and Loïc Nottet, while production was handled by Ozhora Miyagi and Twenty 9. It was digitally made available on 30 October 2017 by Sony Music Entertainment in various countries in celebration of Halloween. Musically, "Doctor" has been described as hip hop-influenced dark pop song, with its instrumentation prominently including bass synthesizers and bells which "add to the song's eerie mood". An editor of Virgin Radio noticed "urban" sounds in the production.

During the lyrics of "Doctor", Nottet details on a toxic relationship with a woman that resulted in him becoming a "body hunter". He blames her for the aforementioned, claiming that she brought out a "bloody beast". Seeking revenge, the singer also mentions "shooting at bodies" as his "way of being free" and feeling remorseless for his actions. According to Hallerman of Wiwibloggs, "even though this girl pushed him to his knees", he still desires a relationship with her. Throughout the track, Nottet also talks to his doctor, admitting that "[he] lost control last night when [he] was with her". Lyrics include: "I call you Mister Doctor cause I think I'm crazy/I've lost my mind, I don't know what's happening to me". Through Nottet's vocal delivery on "Doctor", he portrays a character descending into madness; during the song's final bridge, he "creepily chuckles to himself over his insanity in a perfectly timed accent". According to Nottet, the song was influenced by his love of horror films.

== Reception and live performances ==
"Doctor" was received with positive reviews from selected music critics. Jonathan Currinn of website CelebMix praised the song's unicity and Nottet's vocal delivery, and compared it to material featured on his debut studio album Selfocracy (2017). Yohann Ruelle of Pure Charts likened its "immersive" production to Rihanna's "Bitch Better Have My Money" (2015). Commercially, "Doctor" peaked at number 12 on Wallonia's Ultratip chart, an extension to the main Ultratop. It was promoted by live performances during Nottet's Selfocracy Tour which ran from 2017 to 2018.

== Music video ==
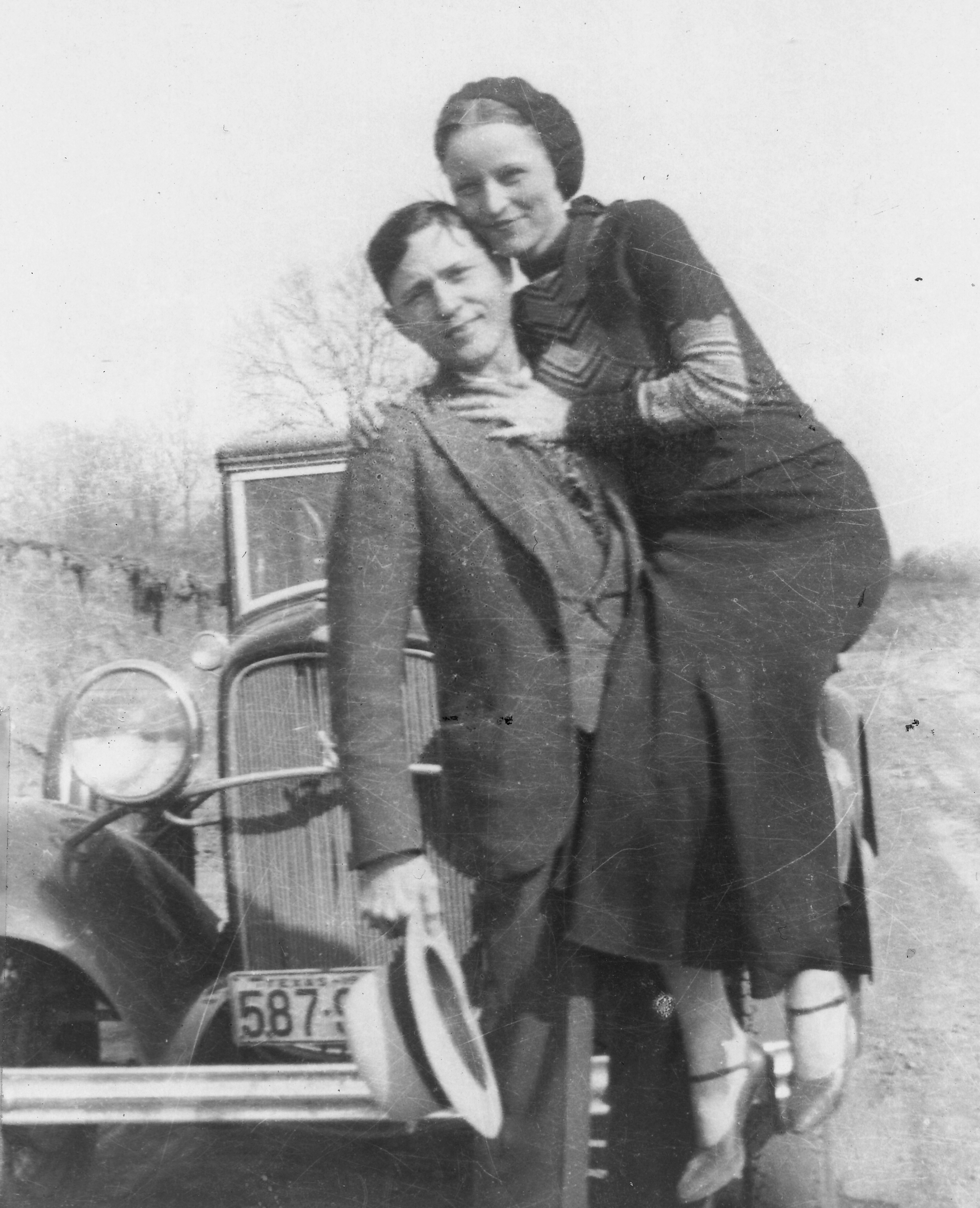
During the music video, Nottet portrays an evil clown and walks the streets of a town at night accompanied by a woman. A reviewer wrote they resembled American criminals Bonnie and Clyde (pictured).

An accompanying music video for "Doctor" was uploaded onto Nottet's official YouTube channel on 30 October 2017, preceded by several teasers posted on the singer's social media. It was directed by Leander Hanssen Jr, while production was handled by Jordy Weyers. During the music video, Nottet is seen walking the streets of a town at night, disguised as a "creepy", "schizophrenic" and "psychopathic" evil clown. Playing the character of "Doctor Nottet", he wears a red overall alongside a yellow sweater and is accompanied by a similarly dressed woman. According to Hallerman of Wiwibloggs, as the night progresses, Nottet's makeup becomes more smeared, reflecting his descent into madness and loss of control. Hallerman saw this as a metaphor for how a relationship is "haunting" him. During the music video, Nottet is taking away candy from children, frightening an old couple, playing pranks on people, tricycling, and showing a "split personality with who we presume is his love interest". Interspersed shots show footage of Nottet during an argument on a telephone.

Reviewers generally praised the music video upon its release. Wyzman Rajaona of Melty called it "the most beautiful trip that Nottet could offer us", while Wiwibloggs's Hallerman thought that it emphasized Nottet's acting qualities as compared to other videos that showed him dancing. Currinn of CelebMix wrote: "This is a whole new side of Nottet that we haven't seen before and we're not sure if we like it or not". An editor writing for Virgin Radio saw the clip as a continuation to "Mud Blood", where Nottet "face[d] his diabolical double". Ruelle of Pure Charts thought that the singer and his female company resembled American criminals Bonnie and Clyde. An editor of website Aficia noted elements of camp in the music video. At the 2017 D6bels Music Awards, "Doctor" received a nomination in the Best Video category.

== Charts ==
Chart (2017)	Peak position
Belgium (Ultratip Bubbling Under Wallonia)	12

== Release history ==
Region	Date	Format	Label
Various	30 October 2017	Digital download	Sony
