= 29 (Loïc Nottet song) =

Single by Loïc Nottet

from the album Sillygomania
- Released: 5 June 2019
- Length: 3:57
- Label: Sony
- Songwriter(s): Sacha Skarbek; Nottet
- Producer(s): Skarbek

Loïc Nottet singles chronology
"On Fire" (2018)	"29" (2019)	"Heartbreaker" (2020)

Music video
- "29" on YouTube

"29" is a song by Belgian singer Loïc Nottet, released for digital download on 5 June 2019 by Sony Music as the third single from his second studio album Sillygomania. It was written by Sacha Skarbek and Nottet, while the production was handled by the latter. A piano-driven ballad, the track builds to a "strong and explosive" chorus and features Nottet reaching high notes throughout. The autobiographical lyrics delve on the ending on a relationship and also approach themes of hopelessness, loneliness and struggle.

An accompanying music video for the track was uploaded to the singer's YouTube channel on 4 June 2019. Directed by Julien Hosmalin, the critically acclaimed clip depicts Nottet and his love interest, played by Fanny Sage, reaching for each other on top of a levitating Mercedes-Benz car. Commercially, the track charted in the Wallonia and Flanders regions of Belgium. It was also promoted by a live performance for MNM.

== Background and composition ==
"29" was written by Loïc Nottet and Sacha Skarbek, while production was handled by the latter. It was released for digital download by Sony Music on 5 June 2019 in various countries. A piano-driven ballad which sees Nottet reaching high notes throughout, the song starts "quiet" and builds to a "strong and explosive" chorus. Its lyrics delve on the ending point of a relationship at which both partners still have feelings for one another. Elvir Pelešević of EuroVisionary also noted that "29" was characterized by feelings of hopelessness, loneliness and struggle. Lyrics include: "Please can we just say / Pretty lies, pretty lies / Lie to each other again / One last time". During the refrain, Nottet sings: "Slowly let me down / Every word pulls me apart / Gently tell me how / To forgive me now / 'Cause all I need is on your lips / They're my enemy / They're my remedy / So slowly let me down / Give me a kiss just one last time". The track's lyrics derive from a "painful" experience of Nottet's, with the singer deeming it "the most personal song" he had ever created. He further elaborated on its autobiographical nature: "I wrote '29' the night of my breakup, the [...] night of October 29 when we kissed for the last time [...] We decided to break it off in a car parked on a parking lot".

== Music video ==
An accompanying music video for "29" was uploaded to Nottet's YouTube channel on 4 June 2019. It was directed by Julien Hosmalin and produced by LEFT productions. The filming process was completed in 16 hours, with Fanny Sage being hired to play the role of Nottet's love interest. The clip starts with Nottet sitting in the driving seat of a Mercedes-Benz car and Sage in the passenger seat of the car looking out the window at pouring rain. The car is subsequently levitating in mid-air against a blue backdrop, with the singer sitting on its bonnet and Sage on its boot. Over the course of the video, they both climb over to each other's side while the car steeply inclines. As they make an attempt to meet in the middle, Nottet loses his balance and eventually falls down. The final scene sees the singer inside the car as in the video's beginning, though he is alone, since Sage had previously left. Jonathan Currinn of CelebMix praised the music video's connection to the song, calling it a "brilliant metaphor regarding the end of a relationship and it's simply interesting to watch". Echoing Currinn's thoughts, Julien Goncalves of Pure Charts called it "melancholic".

== Charts ==
Chart (2019)	Peak position
Belgium (Ultratip Bubbling Under Flanders)	35
Belgium (Ultratop 50 Wallonia)	42

== Release history ==
Country	Date	Format(s)	Label	Ref.
Various	5 June 2019	Digital download; streaming	Sony	
