= Edward Bruce (music executive) =

British music producer (born 1997)

- Born: 26 July 1997 (age 27); Aberdeen, Scotland, United Kingdom
- Genres: British hip hop; grime; Electropop
- Occupations: A&R executive; Record executive; Record producer
- Years active: 2016–present
- Labels: TMG, Red Bull, Sony
- Website: vxxecb.com

Edward Bruce (born 26 July 1997) is a British music executive and producer. He is the founder and CEO of TUIGSE Music Group (TMG), an independent music label, and co-founder of public relations agency Blackspire Partners. Bruce has received Gold and Platinum certifications in France and Belgium for contributions to Loïc Nottet's album Selfocracy (2017).

== Early life and education ==
Bruce was born on 26 July 1997, in Aberdeen, United Kingdom. He attended Robert Gordon’s College. In 2015, he moved to Glasgow to pursue a degree in computing science at the University of Glasgow.

== Career ==
While studying, Bruce founded TMG, an independent music label to collaborate with British grime and hip-hop artists. Bruce has collaborated with brands like the BBC and Boiler Room and engaged in writing sessions with Red Bull Music and Sony/RCA Records UK. Notably, he invested in British rapper Giggs' UK tour, managed grime producers for Red Bull Music's "Beat Roots" mixtape, and influenced Scottish rapper Shogun's career such as his role in the BBC TV series "The Rap Game UK" and collaborating with Dizzee Rascal.

He has received several awards, including the Silver IMPALA certification for his contribution to Shogun's Katana EP and both Platinum and Gold certification awards in Belgium for his involvement in Loïc Nottet's "Selfocracy" album, released under Sony/Jive Epic. He has also received Gold certification for album sales in France.

In 2021, Bruce and Lewis Webster co-founded Blackspire Partners, a PR/marketing agency.

== Discography ==
- Vulcan - Shogun
- Loic Nottet's Selfocracy
- Red Bull Music - Beat Roots
- The Rap Game UK (BBC TV Series) - DJ Target
- Dizzee Rascal
