= Mud Blood =

Single by Loïc Nottet

from the album Selfocracy
- Released: 17 March 2017
- Genre: Electropop
- Length: 3:04
- Label: Jive Epic; Sony
- Songwriters: Amy Morrey; Loïc Nottet
- Producer: Alexandre Germys

Loïc Nottet singles chronology
"Million Eyes" (2016)	"Mud Blood" (2017)	"Doctor" (2017)

"Mud Blood" is a song recorded by Belgian singer Loïc Nottet, released on 17 March 2017 by Jive Epic. Written by Amy Morrey and Nottet and produced by Alexandre Germys, the track acts as the second single for Nottet's debut studio album Selfocracy (2017). Musically, it has been described as a 1980s and rock-inspired electropop song featuring synthesizers in its instrumentation. The lyrics discuss on the presence of demons inside people.

Music critics were positive towards "Mud Blood", praising its construction and catchiness; selected reviewers viewed it as the best track from Selfocracy. An accompanying music video for the song was directed by Edouard Valette and uploaded onto Nottet's official YouTube channel on 21 July 2017. It portrays a fight between good and evil in which two versions of the singer fight against each other by performing choreography. The visual was received with universal acclaim from critics. For further promotion, Nottet performed "Mud Blood" on several radio and television shows, and included it on the setlist of his Selfocracy Tour (2017–2018). The track attained minor commercial success in Belgium.

== Background and composition ==
"Mud Blood"
A 25-second sample of "Mud Blood", 1980s and rock-inspired electropop song prominently featuring synthesizers in its instrumentation.

"Mud Blood" was written by Amy Morrey and Nottet during a 30-minute session in July 2016, while production was solely handled by Alexandre Germys. The latter was also credited for programming and for providing synthesizers. Mixing was handled by Lionel Capouillez, while F.A.M.E.'S. Project provided choir vocals. In an interview Nottet stated that the song's title, although not originally meant to, was a "small tribute" to the term 'Mudblood' used in British novelist J. K. Rowling's Harry Potter fantasy series. "Mud Blood" was released for digital download on 17 March 2017 by Jive Epic in various countries, acting as the second single for the singer's debut studio album Selfocracy (2017). Later also released for streaming by Sony Music Entertainment, it was the first song to be composed for the record.

"Mud Blood" has been described as a 1980s and rock-inspired electropop song that prominently features synthesizers in its refrain. Its "evocative" lyrics discuss on the presence of demons inside people. The track opens with the lyrics: "We got demons/Demons stuck inside our blood/Yeah we got drugs inside our heart/Yeah we eat the mud to be free". Nottet subsequently "scoffs at conformity" with the lines: "We're gonna lose, Mama/ because we choose, Mama/ To say that we're the best, but we look just like the rest", and later references "those who pursue superficial glories": "We want that crown, Mama/And we want it now, Mama/To be the selfish kings of a worthless empire."

== Reception ==
Music critics met "Mud Blood" with positive reviews. Owen Myers of The Fader found the song's chorus to be "instantly catchy", while Wyzman Rajaona of Melty praised the recording as "energetic" and noted its lyrics could be interpreted in multiple ways. Both William Lee Adams of Wiwibloggs and an editor of website Aficia highlighted "Mud Blood" as the best track on Selfocracy. Julien Goncalves of Pure Charts wrote that the song features "a feverish and explosive" production that emphasizes Nottet's vocal qualities. Commercially, "Mud Blood" experienced minor success. On the Wallonian Ultratop ranking, it reached number 17 in July 2017 and spent a total of 22 weeks in the chart. The song has further peaked at number one on the Flemish Ultratip chart, an extension to the main Ultratop.

== Promotion and music video ==
A shot from the music video. It portrays a fight between good and evil in form of a "dance-off" between two versions of Nottet separated by mirrors.

For promotion, Nottet performed "Mud Blood" on several occasions. He first appeared on Virgin Radio on 13 March 2017, followed by a performance for Madmoizelle Music at the end of the month. In April, he sang on Qmusic, MNM, and Één. During Vevo France's Dscvr series, Nottet performed "Mud Blood" on 7 June 2017; he also appeared on Qmusic's Q-Beach House event in July 2017, on RFM in November 2017, as well as on RTBF in January 2018. "Mud Blood" was also included on the setlist of the singer's Selfocracy Tour, which ran from 2017 to 2018. An accompanying music video for the track was uploaded onto Nottet's official YouTube channel on 21 July 2017, coinciding with the Belgian National Day. It was directed by Edouard Valette. During filming, Nottet got minorly injured when jumping into a mirror for a scene. He eventually shared a humorous tweet that read: "Comme quoi, briser la glace, ça fait mal!" (Like what, break the ice, it hurts!), alongside a picture of his arm covered with cuts.

During the visual, a fight between good and evil is presented in form of a "dance-off" between two versions of Nottet. They are separated by mirrors, whereas the first wears white and the second black clothing. The two versions of the singer battle by performing balletic pirouettes and interpretative dance in a minimalistic and "intriguing" setting featuring torches, until the white defeats and jumps into a mirror to break it. As the music video ends, the white version of Nottet is seen walking in a blank room with shards on its floor. Regarding the clip's concept, Nottet stated: "I wanted to explain the song through a fight between my two selves: the good and the evil. The evil wants the good to get dirty in order to escape his problems. Eventually the good prevails, meaning that you have to face your problems, not run away from them. Even though problems are hard to deal with, the most important thing is to never give up."

Critics met the video with universal acclaim. Myers of The Fader thought it was "dramatic" and positively noticed that Nottet "play[ed] with the idea of light and shade". He also likened the music video's ending to Lewis Carroll's novel Through the Looking-Glass (1871). CelebMix's Currinn praised the clip and called it "art", while Wyzman of Melty commended Nottet's choreography and charisma. Adams, writing for Wiwibloggs, noticed the music video's highly cinematic quality and likened it to music videos released by Australian singer Sia. "Mud Blood" was gathered over four million views since its release.

== Charts ==
=== Weekly charts ===
Chart (2017)	Peak position
Belgium (Ultratip Bubbling Under Flanders)	1
Belgium Airplay (Ultratop Flanders)	44
Belgium (Ultratop 50 Wallonia)	17

=== Year-end charts ===
Chart (2017)	Position
Belgium (Ultratop Wallonia)	54

== Release history ==
Region	Date	Format	Label
Various	17 March 2017	Digital download	Jive Epic
Various	N/A 2017	Streaming	Sony
