= Go to Sleep (disambiguation) =

"Go to Sleep" is a song by Radiohead.

Go to Sleep or Go 2 Sleep may also refer to:

- "Go to Sleep" (Lupe Fiasco song), 2012
- "Go to Sleep" (Loïc Nottet song), 2017
- "Go to Sleep", a song by a-ha, from the album Hunting High and Low: Deluxe Edition
- "Go to Sleep", a song by Barbra Streisand from the film On a Clear Day You Can See Forever
- "Go to Sleep", a song by Eminem, DMX, and Obie Trice from the Cradle 2 the Grave film soundtrack album
- "Go to Sleep", an episode of the American children’s television series Bear in the Big Blue House
- "Go 2 Sleep", a song by Ludacris from Word of Mouf
- "Go to Sleep", a song by Roxette from Crash! Boom! Bang!
- "Go to Sleep", a song by Sarah Harmer from All of Our Names
- "Go to Sleep", a song by Sukha, 2023
- "Go To Sleep", a song by Hanumankind
- Go to Sleep (wrestling), a professional wrestling attack

== See also ==
- "I Go to Sleep", a song by The Kinks, also covered by the Pretenders
- Go to Sleep Jeff!, a 2003 album by The Wiggles
- Go the Fuck to Sleep, a book by Adam Mansbach
