= Heartbreaker (Loïc Nottet song) =

Single by Loïc Nottet

from the album Sillygomania
- Released: 19 February 2020
- Length: 3:56
- Label: Sony Music
- Songwriter(s): Loïc Nottet; Amy Morrey
- Producer(s): Skydancers; Alex Germys

Loïc Nottet singles chronology
| "29" (2019) | "Heartbreaker" (2020) | "Mr/Mme" (2020) |

"Heartbreaker" is a song by Belgian singer Loïc Nottet. It was released on 19 February 2020 by Sony Music as the fourth single from his second studio album Sillygomania. The song was written by Nottet and Amy Morrey.

== Music video ==
A music video to accompany the release of "Heartbreaker" was first released onto YouTube on 2 March 2020. The video was directed by Hugo Jouxtel, produced by Julein Sultan-Fournier, and stars only Loïc Nottet.

The music video opens on Loïc driving a car, which stops as he gets out. The video then pans through multiple sets, including a science classroom, a bedroom, and a drive-in theater. The video appears to take place in 1 shot. Throughout the video, the main focus is Loïc dancing alone, while lip-syncing to the music.

== Track listing ==
Digital download
| No. | Title | Length |
|---|---|---|
| 1. | "Heartbreaker" | 3:56 |

Digital download
| No. | Title | Length |
|---|---|---|
| 1. | "Heartbreaker" (Panteros666 Remix) | 4:35 |

== Charts ==
=== Weekly charts ===
| Chart (2020) | Peak position |
|---|---|
| Belgium (Ultratop 50 Flanders) | 14 |
| Belgium (Ultratop 50 Wallonia) | 5 |

=== Year-end charts ===
| Chart (2020) | Position |
|---|---|
| Belgium (Ultratop Flanders) | 47 |
| Belgium (Ultratop Wallonia) | 32 |

== Certifications ==
| Region | Certification | Certified units/sales |
|---|---|---|
| Belgium (BRMA) | Gold | 10,000^{‡} |
^{‡} Sales+streaming figures based on certification alone.
