= Rhythm Inside (Loïc Nottet song) =

2015 song by Loïc Nottet

- Original cover for the single's digital release. It has since then been replaced with another photograph of Nottet.

Single by Loïc Nottet
- Released: 10 March 2015
- Genre: Pop; new wave; R&B; electro; soul; hip hop
- Length: 2:52
- Label: Sony
- Songwriters: Loïc Nottet; Beverly Jo Scott
- Producer: Luuk Cox

Loïc Nottet singles chronology
"Rhythm Inside" (2015)	"Million Eyes" (2016)

Audio sample
- "Rhythm Inside": file; help

Eurovision Song Contest 2015 entry
- Country: Belgium
- Artist: Loïc Nottet
- Language: English
- Composer: Luuk Cox
- Lyricists: Nottet; Beverly Jo Scott

Finals performance
- Semi-final result: 2nd
- Semi-final points: 149
- Final result: 4th
- Final points: 217

Entry chronology
- ◄ "Mother" (2014)
- "What's the Pressure" (2016) ►

"Rhythm Inside" is a song by Belgian singer Loïc Nottet. It was released as his debut single on 10 March 2015 for radio airplay, while Sony Music Entertainment distributed it digitally one day later. The track was written by Nottet alongside Beverly Jo Scott, while production was solely handled by Luuk Cox. Previously, Nottet had participated in his native singing competition The Voice Belgique in 2014—where he finished second and thus rose to prominence—and had chosen Scott's team. "Rhythm Inside" has been described as an alternative-inspired pop, new wave, R&B, electro, soul and hip hop song, with its minimalistic instrumentation consisting of finger clicks, percussion and synthesizer pads. "Rhythm Inside" lyrically discusses moral universalism.

The song represented Belgium in the Eurovision Song Contest 2015 after being internally selected by RTBF. It ultimately reached fourth place in a field of 27, scoring a total of 217 points. During Nottet's minimalistic and black and white-themed show, he was accompanied by four backing vocalists while the background LED screens displayed white 3D boxes moving to the song's rhythm. "Rhythm Inside" was well received by music critics, who praised Nottet's vocals, as well as the song's production and lyrics. Several reviewers compared it to the works of Lorde and Sia.

In order to promote and support "Rhythm Inside", Nottet performed it on several occasions. The song was also covered by various artists and included on the setlist for his Selfocracy Tour (2017–2018). Three accompanying music videos were released for the track in 2015, of which one is titled "Alice in Nightmareland" and features Justine Vercleven portraying the fictional character Alice. The other two visuals focus on "opposites and fighting conceptions" and science fiction, respectively. Commercially, "Rhythm Inside" reached the top 100 of several countries after the Eurovision Song Contest and peaked at number one in the Wallonian and Flemish regions of Belgium. It was certified Platinum by the Belgian Entertainment Association (BEA) for sales exceeding 20,000 units.

== Background and composition ==
Belgian singer Loïc Nottet became prominent after finishing second in his native singing competition The Voice Belgique in 2014, as part of Beverly Jo Scott's team. She would eventually help Nottet write his debut single, "Rhythm Inside", while production was solely handled by Luuk Cox. It was mastered by Stuart Hawkes at the Metropolis Studios in London, United Kingdom. After a snippet of the track surfaced online prior to its premiere, "Rhythm Inside" was released for radio airplay on 10 March 2015 and was first broadcast by Belgian radio station VivaCité. The song's digital availability followed one day later in various countries, conducted by Sony Music Entertainment.

"Rhythm Inside" has been described as an alternative-inspired pop, new wave, R&B, electro, soul and hip hop song. Its minimalistic instrumentation consists of finger clicks, percussion and synthesizer pads. While Shioban Palmer of The Daily Telegraph described the track as "punchy and funky", Moustique's Sébastien Ministru noticed a "tribal atmosphere". Lyrically, Nottet stated that the song deals with moral universalism. Music critics also identified other lyrical themes; according to Theo Vatmanidis of EuroVisionary, "Rhythm Inside" is about "getting attuned to a cosmic rhythm of love". A writer of RTVE concluded that the track "conveys[s] the mechanism of our hearts is invariable and that only our individual decisions mark what we will leave in this world". They further wrote: "Do not force yourself to please others, find your own rhythm and you will see that you do not walk alone". Daphne Dee of Wiwibloggs noted that the singer "philosophise[s] on good and evil". One line in the track is "We gonna ra-pa-pap, ra-pa-pap/We gonna ra-pa-pap tonight", which Nottet sings in a reggae-inspired accent to modulate the sound of a beating heart. Another editor of Wiwibloggs mentioned that the singer provided gospel vocals in the song.

== Critical reception and accolades ==
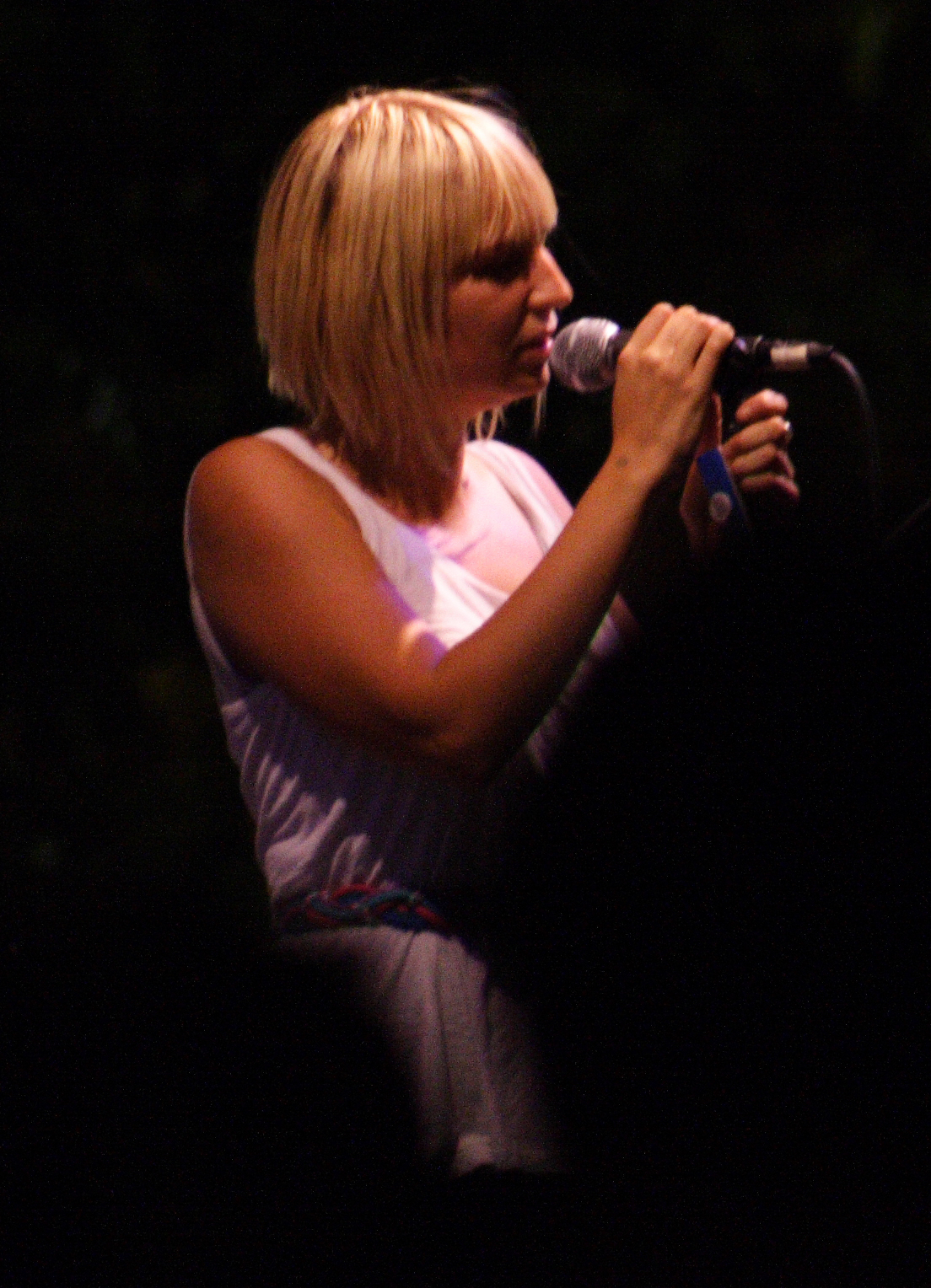
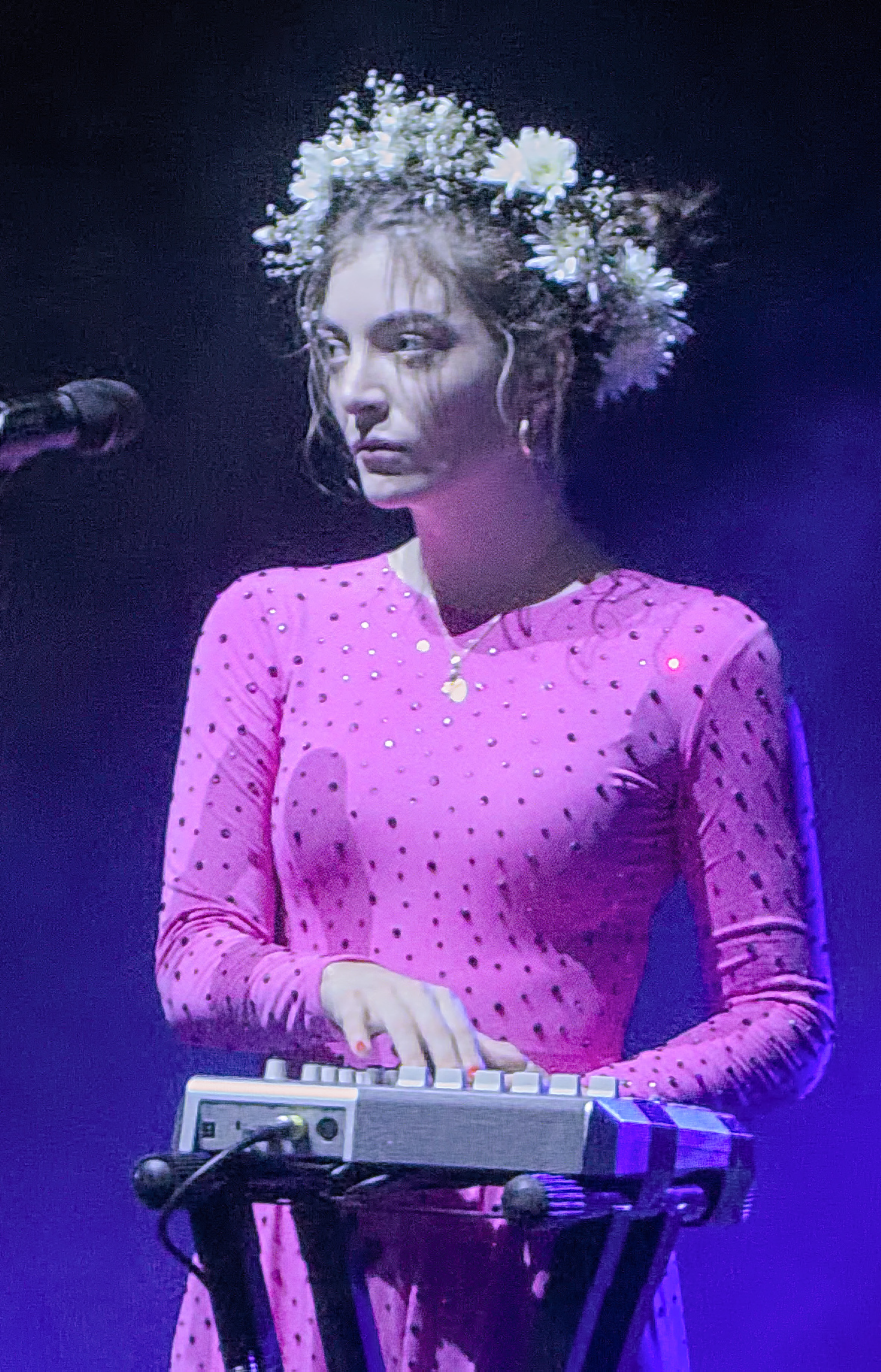
Various music critics found "Rhythm Inside" to be reminiscent of music released by singers Sia (pictured left) and Lorde (pictured right).

Music critics positively received "Rhythm Inside". In a Wiwibloggs review containing several reviews from individual critics, praise was outspoken towards the song's catchiness, as well as its contemporary and dark nature. Nottet's voice was commended alongside the track's complex lyrics and production. Overall, the reviewers on the website gave "Rhythm Inside" 8.31 out of 10 points. Benny Royston of Metro called the track "slick, smooth and almost hypnotic", while Moustique's Ministru praised its production and described Nottet's voice as "confusing, transgender and powerful". Echoing Ministru's thoughts, an editor of B.Z. noted that Nottet's English pronunciation during the song had a Wallonian accent. Multiple reviewers likened "Rhythm Inside" to material released by Sia and Lorde. The track would go on to win in the Hit of the Year category at the 2015 D6bels Music Awards, and it was also crowned as the best song in Belgium's history at the Eurovision Song Contest by website Songestival.be in 2018.

== Music videos ==
An accompanying music video for "Rhythm Inside" was uploaded onto Eurovision Song Contest's official YouTube channel on 10 March 2015, although it has been since deleted. The same day, the clip was first broadcast on Belgian television channel La Une. It was directed by Josh Brandão and Nicolai Kornum at the BlitzWerk studio in London, while Nottet carries credits for the clip's storyboard, outfits and choreography. It starts with shots of cogwheels and other mechanism, while Nottet is eventually presented sitting on a red chair wearing black clothing. Subsequently, shots of a topless man looking at his phone, a woman staring in a compact, a girl wearing a dress and holding a doll in her hands, as well as a boy playing video games are shown. Over the course of the next couple of seconds, several other people are introduced; some of them later stand next to the aforementioned persons in similar postures. Interspersed, water and red paint is ejected on Nottet, and eventually on the people. The clip ends with a "soaking wet" Nottet looking into the camera. Several shots in the music video are pulsating or blinking. According to Chris Haplin of Wiwibloggs, the clip "focuses on opposites and fighting conceptions, with shots including two young girls: one a beauty queen, the other playing with dinosaurs". Shioban Palmer of The Daily Telegraph likened the music video to the work of Jedward.

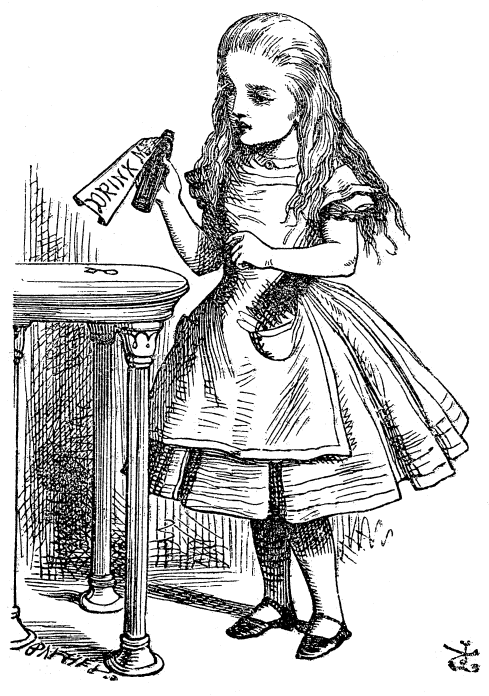
fictional character Alice (illustrated by John Tenniel) is portrayed by Justine Vercleven in "Alice in Nightmareland".

In May 2015, a "dance-based reinterpretation" of the song titled "Alice in Nightmareland" was released online. Nottet carries several credits, including the director, costume designer and choreographer. The music video commences with the sentence "Before being a singer, I was and am a dancer" being displayed onscreen, after which shots of "creepy" and "evil" nurses walking inside a hospital are shown. A surgeon subsequently appears, carrying a screaming woman (played by Justine Vercleven) wearing a yellow dress. He brings her into a room where she is ultimately left alone sitting on a chair; she runs to another room to perform choreography with the aforementioned nurses and surgeon, who also undress her in white. After all falling asleep, the woman awakens again and proceeds to leave the building. Running in a multicolored forest, she finds a clock on a tree and subsequently encounters a "shirtless, gyrating" Nottet. They perform choreography in the forest and in an abandoned building. Both are eventually found by the nurses and surgeon presented in the video's beginning and fight against them. The video ends with all standing in one line and staring at the camera. According to Halpin of Wiwibloggs, Vercleven plays the character of Alice. He likened the clip and choreography to Sia's music video for "Elastic Heart" (2013) and suggested it was a source of inspiration for Nottet.

A third and final music video for "Rhythm Inside" was uploaded onto Nottet's YouTube channel on 13 October 2015. The clip begins with several people—including Nottet—placed inside a container. A man subsequently opens one of its doors and leads the persons to a warehouse. In groups of two each, selected people are tied up, showered down, undressed and then led into another room. When coming for his turn, Nottet manages to run away through a hallway, and reaches another room similar to an amphitheatre. However, the singer falls down towards the video's end and is approached from behind by a creature whose face cannot be seen. Robyn Gallagher of Wiwibloggs opined that the music video took place in a "bleak, dystopian sci-fi world", while identifying The Hunger Games, as well as the music videos for Lorde's "Team" (2013) and Stromae's "Ta fête" (2014) as possible inspirations. She further concluded that "there are echoes of events in the real world, both past and present", and likened the creature introduced towards the visual's end to "the sort of creature that wouldn't be out of place on an episode of Doctor Who". An editor of NRJ suggested that the people at the beginning could have been brought together for human experimentation. Jonathan Hamard of Pure Charts described the clip's atmosphere as "subdued and disturbing".

== Live performances and other usage ==
For promotion, Nottet performed the song on several occasions. He first appeared on the radio stations Qmusic and Joe FM on 30 March 2015. In April 2015, the singer performed for MNM, while for The Voice Belgique on in May 2015. Other performances in 2015 include on NRJ in June, on Één in July, and on NRJ's C'Cauet programme in December. In 2017, Nottet sang "Rhythm Inside" for RFM in March, for Qmusic's Q-Beach House event in July, as well as for VivaCité's Viva for Life event in December. "Rhythm Inside" was also included on the setlist of the singer's Selfocracy Tour, which ran from 2017 to 2018. The track was covered by several artists, including singers Sennek, SuRie, and Lidia Isac, as well as the band Elaiza.

== At Eurovision ==
=== Internal selection ===
Belgian broadcaster RTBF confirmed its intentions to participate in the Eurovision Song Contest 2015 on 3 June 2014, however without mentioning the selection method for their entrant. Subsequently, the broadcaster announced on 3 November 2014 that they had internally selected Nottet to represent Belgium in the competition. On 10 March 2015, RTBF held a press conference at the Maison de Vienne in Brussels, where "Rhythm Inside" was unveiled as the Belgian entry for the contest. Label Sony Music Entertainment's Philippe Coppens stated during an interview: "Our first objective was to choose a song that definitely does not sound like a typical Eurovision Song Contest song. The world of Nottet is very far from the contest".

=== In Vienna ===
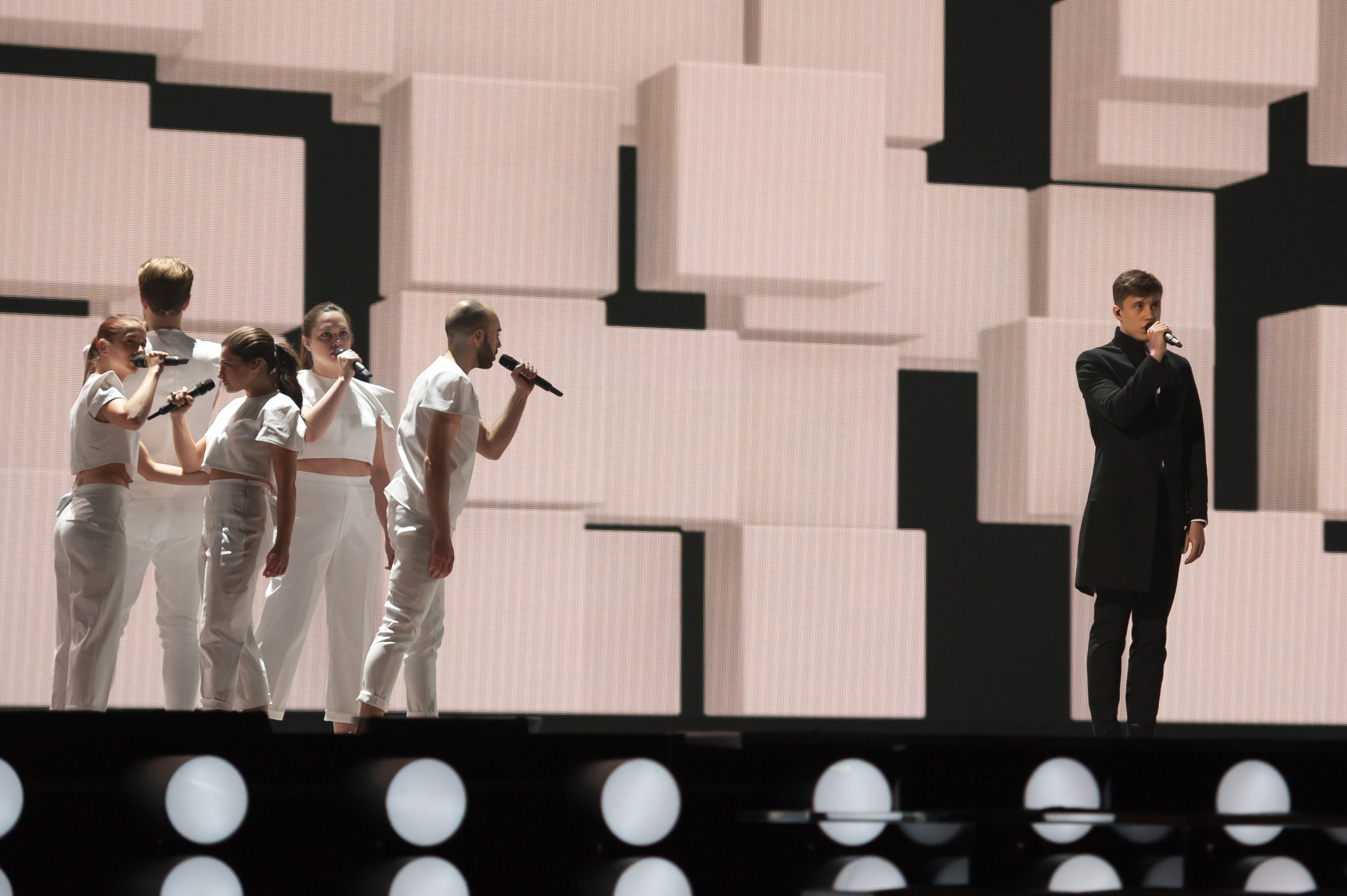
Nottet during a rehearsal for the Eurovision Song Contest 2015. During his minimalistic and black and white-themed performance, he is accompanied onstage by five background vocalists.

The Eurovision Song Contest 2015 took place at the Wiener Stadthalle in Vienna, Austria and consisted of two semi-finals on 19 and 21 May, and the final on 23 May 2015. According to Eurovision rules, each country, except the host country and the "Big 5" (France, Germany, Italy, Spain and the United Kingdom), is required to qualify from one of two semi-finals to compete for the final; the top ten countries from each semi-final progressed to the final. Nottet sang third in the first semi-final following Armenia and preceding the Netherlands, while he performed 13th in the Grand Final following Australia and preceding Austria. Nottet was one of the favorites to win the contest according to bookmakers.

For his performance, Nottet contributed in terms of choreography, outfits and visual effects. Described as minimalistic and black and white-themed, the singer's show sees him accompanied by five backing vocalists—Katie Bernstein, Michael Storrs, Susanna Marie Cork, Sarah Covey and Nicolas Dorian. They wear all-white costumes "to match the stage presentation", while Nottet sports a "futuristic" black suit. They occasionally perform choreography in the form of "jerky moves". Nottet is shown marching, while also performing pirouettes. At one point, he lies on the floor, with one vocalist putting her foot up on his chest to add "a surrealy and dangerous element to the performance". At the end of the show the backing vocalists fall to the floor and align horizontally, after which Nottet looks into camera in a close-up shot. During the performance, the background LED screen displays white 3D boxes moving to the song's rhythm. "Strobe" flash lighting and lighting in form of dots is also used, while black lines are projected on the stage.

Nottet's performance received generally positive reviews from critics. Paidraig Muldoon of Wiwibloggs thought the show had avant-garde elements, while The Fader's Michael Cragg drew attention that Nottet and his backing vocalists visually created a "human chess board". Nottet's performance was praised by the Prime Minister of Belgium Charles Michel, however an editor of The Guardian criticized the singer's facial expressions, stating he "mainly looks like he is suffering from indigestion".

==== Points awarded to Belgium ====
Below is a breakdown of points awarded to Belgium in the first semi-final and Grand Final of the contest. On the first occasion, the country finished in second place with a total of 149 points, including 12 from the Netherlands, France, Finland and Denmark, ten from Hungary, Spain and Estonia, as well as eight from Russia and Australia. In the Grand Final of the Eurovision Song Contest, Belgium finished in fourth position, gathering a total of 217 points, including 12 awarded by the Netherlands, Hungary and France, ten by Sweden and Russia, and eight by Germany and Belarus.

Points awarded to Belgium (Semi-Final 1)
12 points	10 points	8 points	7 points	6 points
Denmark; Finland; France; Netherlands	Estonia; Hungary; Spain	Australia; Russia	Romania; Serbia	Albania; Austria; Belarus; Greece; Macedonia
5 points	4 points	3 points	2 points	1 point
Georgia; Moldova				Armenia

Points awarded to Belgium (Final)
12 points	10 points	8 points	7 points	6 points
France; Hungary; Netherlands	Russia; Sweden	Belarus; Germany	Cyprus; Denmark; Estonia; Finland; Greece; Italy; Lithuania; Norway; Romania	Australia; Czech Republic; Georgia; Moldova; Spain
5 points	4 points	3 points	2 points	1 point
Austria; Poland; Portugal; San Marino	Armenia; Iceland; Israel; Latvia; Serbia	Slovenia; United Kingdom	Ireland; Switzerland	Albania; Macedonia

== Charts ==
=== Weekly charts ===
Chart (2015)	Peak position
Australia (ARIA)	61
Austria (Ö3 Austria Top 40)	2
Belgium (Ultratop 50 Flanders)	1
Belgium (Ultratop 50 Wallonia)	1
CIS Airplay (TopHit)	174
Finland (Suomen virallinen lista)	13
France (SNEP)	85
Germany (GfK)	21
Greece Digital Songs (Billboard)	10
Iceland (Tónlist)	12
Ireland (IRMA)	83
Netherlands (Single Top 100)	26
Scottish Singles Sales (Official Charts)	38
Sweden (Sverigetopplistan)	12
Switzerland (Schweizer Hitparade)	34
UK Singles (Official Charts)	69

=== Year-end charts ===
Chart (2015)	Position
Austria (Ö3 Austria)	143
Belgium (Ultratop Flanders)	14
Belgium (Ultratop Wallonia)	17

== Certifications ==
Region	Certification	Certified units/sales
Belgium (BRMA)	Platinum	20,000^{*}
^{*} Sales figures based on certification alone.

== Release history ==
Region	Date	Format	Label
Belgium	10 March 2015	Radio airplay	—N/a
Various	11 March 2015	Digital download	Sony
