= Million Eyes =

Single by Loïc Nottet

from the album Selfocracy
- Released: 27 October 2016
- Genre: Electropop
- Length: 4:14
- Label: Sony
- Songwriters: Amy Morrey; Loïc Nottet
- Producer: Luuk Cox

Loïc Nottet singles chronology
"Rhythm Inside" (2015)	"Million Eyes" (2016)	"Mud Blood" (2017)

"Million Eyes" is a song recorded by Belgian singer Loïc Nottet, released on 27 October 2016 by Sony Music Entertainment. Written by Amy Morrey and Nottet and produced by Luuk Cox, the track was chosen as the lead single of Nottet's debut studio album Selfocracy (2017). Musically, it has been described as an experimental-inspired dark electropop power ballad featuring piano in its instrumentation. The lyrics discuss Nottet being observed by a "million eyes", as well as on judgments and internal battles. Inspired by the 2008 film Changeling and the music of Sia, "Million Eyes" features androgynous vocals from Nottet. Reviewers likened the song to the work of Rihanna, The Weeknd and Alice on the Roof.

Music critics were generally positive towards "Million Eyes", praising its power, composition and structure, as well as Nottet's delivery. At the 2017 D6bels Music Awards, the song was nominated in the Hit of the Year category. An accompanying music video was uploaded onto the singer's official YouTube channel simultaneously with the single's release, and was directed by Zeb Daemen of Caviar Productions. Shot mostly in black and white, it portrays Nottet performing contemporary dance in a body of water. The visual was received with universal acclaim from critics. For further promotion, Nottet performed "Million Eyes" on several radio and television shows, and included it on the setlist of his Selfocracy Tour (2017–2018). The track attained commercial success in Wallonia and France. It was also certified Gold and Diamond by the Belgian Entertainment Association (BEA) and Syndicat National de l'Édition Phonographique (SNEP) for selling over 10,000 and 250,000 units, respectively.

== Background and composition ==
"Million Eyes"
A 24-second sample of "Million Eyes", an experimental-inspired dark electropop power ballad. Nottet's tone has been described as androgynous.

"Million Eyes" was written by Amy Morrey and Notett, while production was solely handled by Luuk Cox. Cox was further credited for programming, Ken Lewis for mixing and Michel "Chelle" Dierickx for recording. In an interview, Nottet stated that the song was personal to him and that he wrote it in around ten minutes during a "sad and nostalgic" night. He cites the "sad" film Changeling (2008), which he watched without sound, as an inspiration for the song's melody. "Million Eyes" was released for digital download on 27 October 2016 by Sony Music Entertainment in various countries. Originally, another song from Nottet's then-unreleased debut studio album Selfocracy (2017) had been chosen as the lead single for the record; instead, "Million Eyes" was picked "at the last minute", as Nottet felt it would appeal more to listeners.

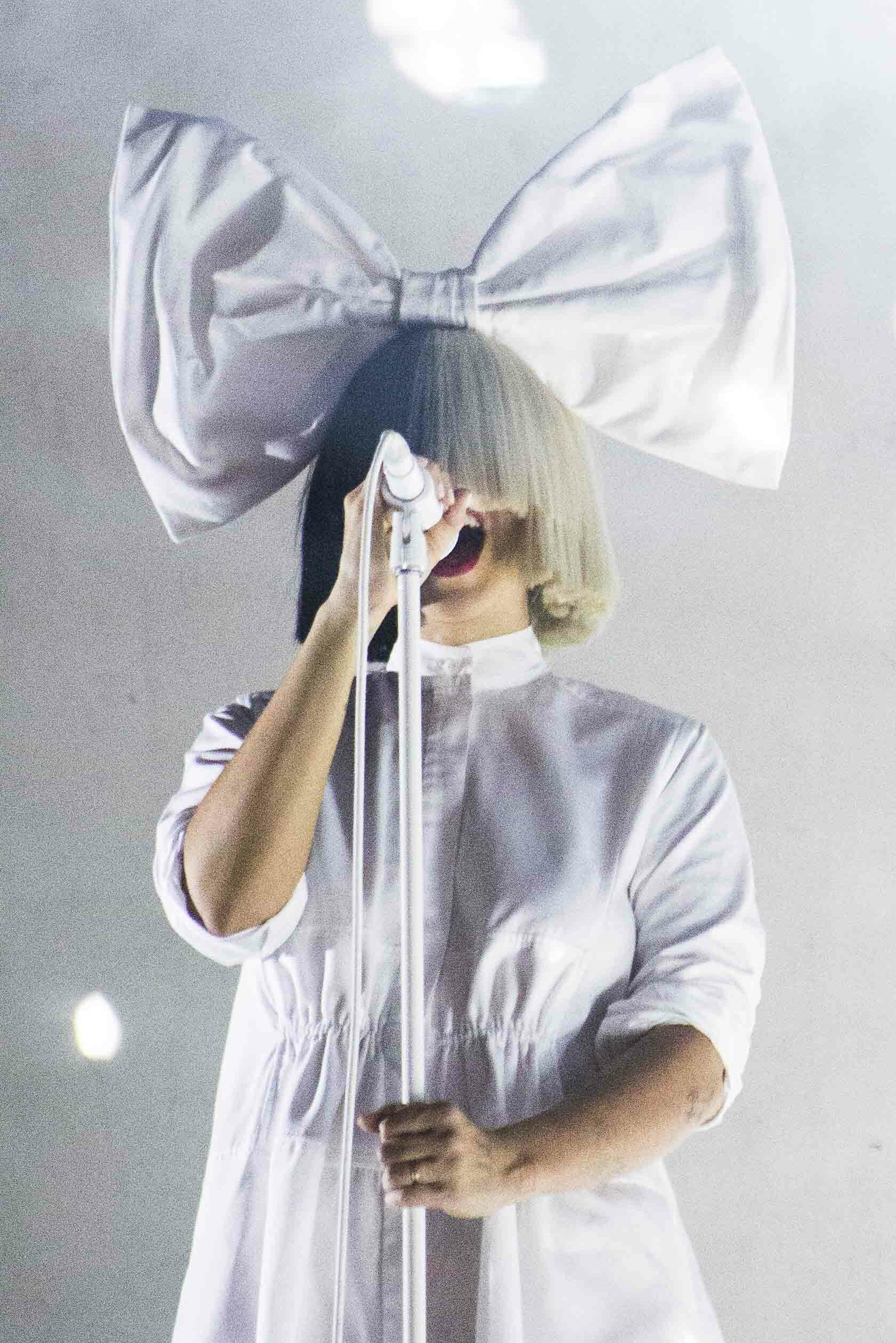
Music released by Australian singer Sia (pictured) inspired Nottet when composing "Million Eyes".

"Million Eyes" has been described as an experimental-inspired dark electropop power ballad. Its instrumentation features piano notes that are "wrapped in a hazy aura". Throughout the track's lyrics, Nottet speaks of 'million eyes' watching and "forcing him to put on a fake smile as a mask". Ruben Vanyper of TF1 wrote: "'Million Eyes' delves, with sensitivity and sincerity, on the impact that the judgments and the harshness of words have on some people", while Yohann Ruelle of Pure Charts thought the lyrics discussed internal battles.

During the song's refrain, Nottet sings: "'Cause with your million eyes you're watching me/You talk behind my back/You spy on me/So I scream and shout to make you leave/But you're still here, you keep judging me with your million eyes". Chris Halpin of Wiwibloggs noted fragility in one fellow line from the track: "Too different, I'm scared of judgement". Throughout "Million Eyes", Nottet reaches for high notes, and he changes the key he sings in an "overwrought" manner towards the end. Nottet himself explained that the song was inspired by the works of Australian singer Sia, while critics also noticed the influence of Barbadian performer Rihanna, American recording artist The Weeknd and Belgian singer Alice on the Roof.

== Reception ==
Upon its release, "Million Eyes" was met with generally positive reviews from music critics. Ruelle of Pure Charts classified Nottet's vocals as powerful, fragile and "wrapped in a hazy atmosphere", noting that they are especially showcased in the song's refrain. Manon Michel, writing for Les Inrockuptibles, commended the singer's voice for being "almost" androgynous. Moustique's Luc Lorfèvre praised the track's production and structure, and compared its lyrics to English rock band Placebo's "Too Many Friends" (2013). Both Jonathan Currinn of CelebMix and an editor of La Libre Belgique praised Nottet's delivery, and noted that "Million Eyes" contained elements from his debut single, "Rhythm Inside" (2015). The latter author further wrote that "Million Eyes" "uses its crystalline [nature] to take its listener towards dark but dreamlike horizons". In a more mixed review, Halpin of Wiwibloggs praised the song for being accessible to listeners, but criticized it as "cold", as well as commented on Nottet's emotionally exaggerated and thus "distracting" delivery. "Million Eyes" was named the best song of 2016 by Wiwibloggs, and was nominated in the Hit of the Year category at the 2017 D6bels Music Awards.

Commercially, the track experienced success on some record charts after its release. In native Belgium, it debuted peaked at number two in the Wallonia region, spending 25 weeks in the Ultratop ranking and 17 nonconsecutive weeks within the top ten. "Million Eyes" also reached number 43 in Flanders, and was certified Gold by the Belgian Entertainment Association (BEA) for over 10,000 copies sold. The song fared well in France, reaching number five in April 2017, with 3,421 copies sold in that week. It spent a total of 42 weeks in the ranking. For more than 230,000 units sold, "Million Eyes" was awarded Diamond by the Syndicat National de l'Édition Phonographique (SNEP). The track further entered and peaked at number 43 on the Swiss Hitparade, and reached number three in the country's Romandy region.

== Music video ==
A shot from the mostly black and white music video, showing Nottet performing contemporary dance in a body of water. A reviewer described the set as "an extremely graphic and minimalist black and white pop universe".

Preceded by a 16-second teaser, an accompanying music video for "Million Eyes" was uploaded onto Nottet's official YouTube channel on 27 October 2016, at around 18:00. It was shot by Zeb Daemen of Caviar Productions. During an interview, Nottet elaborated: "I love Tim Burton and I get a lot of musical inspiration from films like The Conjuring, The Lady in Black or Insidious [...]. [These movies show the] dark sides of humanity, but I try to ensure that my music remains accessible to everyone, as I do not want to make a horror film".

The music video was mostly shot in black and white. Michel of Les Inrockuptibles described its set as "an extremely graphic and minimalist black and white pop universe", while Nottet himself explained that: "I wanted it sober, black but classy and very simple because I [see] it as a bare exposure". During the visual, the singer performs contemporary dance in a body of water, wearing a black outfit that La Libre Belgique described as "deeply mysterious". Towards the end of the video, Nottet collapses; however he gets up again as the clip becomes color, representing him having found "a symbol".

Reviewers met the music video with universal acclaim. Currinn praised it, calling it "a pure performance piece that includes [...] Nottet prov[ing] himself as a vivid emotional performer, interpreting his own song and the meaning behind it". He further stated: "This song becomes so much more thanks to the visual; it blows us away and leaves us speechless everytime we watch it." An editor of website Aficia applauded the singer's emotional dancing, comparing it to that of American dancer Maddie Ziegler. Jade Olivier described the choreography as "flexibility, emotion, energy" and went on to liken it to Nottet's appearances on the sixth season of French television show Danse avec les stars.

== Live performances ==
For promotional purposes, Nottet performed "Million Eyes" on several occasions since 2016. He first appeared on Jonas & VanGeel on 5 November 2016, as well as on radio stations MNM, Radio 2, and NRJ later that month. The singer performed on the seventh season of Danse avec les stars on 16 December 2016, accompanied by Canadian and French dancers Nico Archambault and Fauve Hautot, respectively. He also sang "Million Eyes" on Madmoizelle Music, and Virgin Radio that same month. In January 2017, Nottet appeared on C à vous, on NRJ's C'Cauet programme, as well as on Chérie FM. A performance for RFM Music Live followed in March, as well as for Le Grand Studio RTL The Voice Belgique in April, and for RTL Nederland in May 2017. "Million Eyes" was also included on the setlist of the singer's Selfocracy Tour, which ran from 2017 to 2018. Nottet further sang the track at the D6Bels Music Awards on 26 January 2018.

== Credits and personnel ==
Credits adapted from the liner notes of Selfocracy.

- Loïc Nottet – lead vocals, songwriter
- Amy Morrey – songwriter
- Luuk Cox – producer, programming
- Michel "Chelle" Dierickx – recording
- Ken Lewis – mixing

== Charts ==
=== Weekly charts ===
Chart (2016–2017)	Peak position
Belgium (Ultratop 50 Flanders)	23
Belgium (Ultratop 50 Wallonia)	2
France (SNEP)	5
Switzerland (Schweizer Hitparade)	43
Switzerland (Media Control Romandy)	3

=== Year-end charts ===
Chart (2017)	Position
Belgium (Ultratop Wallonia)	25
France (SNEP)	41

== Certifications ==
Region	Certification	Certified units/sales
Belgium (BRMA)	Gold	10,000^{‡}
France (SNEP)	Diamond	233,333^{‡}
^{‡} Sales+streaming figures based on certification alone.

== Release history ==
Region	Date	Format	Label	Ref.
Various	27 October 2016	Digital download	Sony	
