= Go to Sleep (Loïc Nottet song) =

Single by Loïc Nottet
- Released: 22 December 2017
- Length: 3:17
- Label: Sony
- Songwriter: Nottet
- Producer: Nottet

Loïc Nottet singles chronology
"Doctor" (2017)	"Go to Sleep" (2017)	"On Fire" (2018)

"Go to Sleep" is a song by Belgian singer Loïc Nottet, released on 22 December 2017 for digital download by Sony Music Entertainment. Written and produced by Nottet, the song was released in celebration of Christmas. Musically it is a minimally produced piano ballad whose lyrics discuss love and friendship in difficult times. Music critics gave positive reviews of "Go to Sleep", praising the song's message and nature, as well as Nottet's vocal delivery.

An accompanying music video was uploaded onto Nottet's YouTube channel simultaneously with the single's release, and was directed by Sidney van Wichelen. It portrays the singer and a woman performing choreography in front of a Christmas tree and a bench placed in front of it. For further promotion, Nottet performed "Go to Sleep" during VivaCité's Viva for Life programme on 22 December 2017. Commercially, the song reached the Ultratip rankings in both the Flanders and Wallonia regions of Belgium.

== Background and composition ==
"Go to Sleep"
A 23-second sample of "Go to Sleep", a piano ballad discussing love and friendship in difficult times. His vocal delivery is set in piano.

"Go to Sleep" is the first single that Loïc Nottet wrote and produced by himself. It was digitally released on 22 December 2017 by Sony Music Entertainment, in celebration of Christmas. A minimally produced piano ballad, Nottet's vocal delivery is set in piano. According to Roy Knoops of ESCToday, "Go to Sleep" lyrically discusses "the power of love and friendship, even in difficult times". Lyrics include: "Don't you worry babe so go to sleep/And save your tears/I know the dreamer last within/Let's wish to fly/Just you and I/So close your eyes to stop your cries/Baby go to sleep".

== Reception ==
Music critics met "Go to Sleep" with favourable reviews upon its release. ESCToday's Roy Knoops called the song "gentle yet poignant", while noting that it "captures the true spirit of the Christmas season". Julien Goncalves of PureMédias labelled the song "heartbreaking", and Virgin Radio pointed out "sweetness, love and tenderness". Christophe Segard, writing for website Aficia, praised the "power and softness" of "Go to Sleep" and commended Nottet's vocal delivery. Jonathan Vautrey of Wiwibloggs likened the track to material released by Australian singer Sia, particularly "Snowflake" from her eight studio album Everyday Is Christmas (2017). He concluded: "If you’ve got some hyperactive kids in your family [..], then this could be the perfect song to help them get off to sleep, as well as for you to relax too at the end of a busy Christmas Day." Commercially, "Go to Sleep" attained minor success on record charts. In native Belgium, it reached number 13 on the Wallonian Ultratip chart, while being registered on the same ranking in the Flanders region.

== Music video and promotion ==
An accompanying music video for "Go to Sleep" was uploaded onto Nottet's official YouTube channel on 22 December 2017. It was directed by Sidney van Wichelen and produced by Vansiproduction and Vangarde; Maxime Desmet and Jens Burrez were hired as director of photography and artistic director, respectively. During the visual, Nottet and a woman—wearing a red-black suit and a red dress, respectively—perform choreography in front of a Christmas tree. Goncalves of Pure Charts assumed that the woman played the singer's girlfriend. They also occasionally sit on a bench placed in front of the tree. Interspersed shots during the music video show Nottet singing to the song sporting a black shirt. Reviewers gave mixed reviews of the clip. An editor of Virgin Radio wrote that it was "full of grace and elegance" and labelled the choreography as "full of poetry". Although also praising the choreography, Segard of Aficia criticized "the square format of the clip and its staging [as] too poor" in comparison to the maximalist production of Nottet's previous visual for "Doctor" (2017). To further promote "Go to Sleep", Nottet performed it on VivaCité's Viva for Life programme on 22 December 2017.

== Charts ==
Chart (2017)	Peak position
Belgium (Ultratip Flanders)	—N/a (Note: "Go to Sleep" was registered on the Ultratip Bubbling Under chart for four weeks, although its peak position was not revealed.)
Belgium (Ultratip Bubbling Under Wallonia)	13

== Release history ==
Region	Date	Format	Label
Various	22 December 2017	Digital download	Sony
