= Beverly Jo Scott =

American singer-songwriter (born 1959)

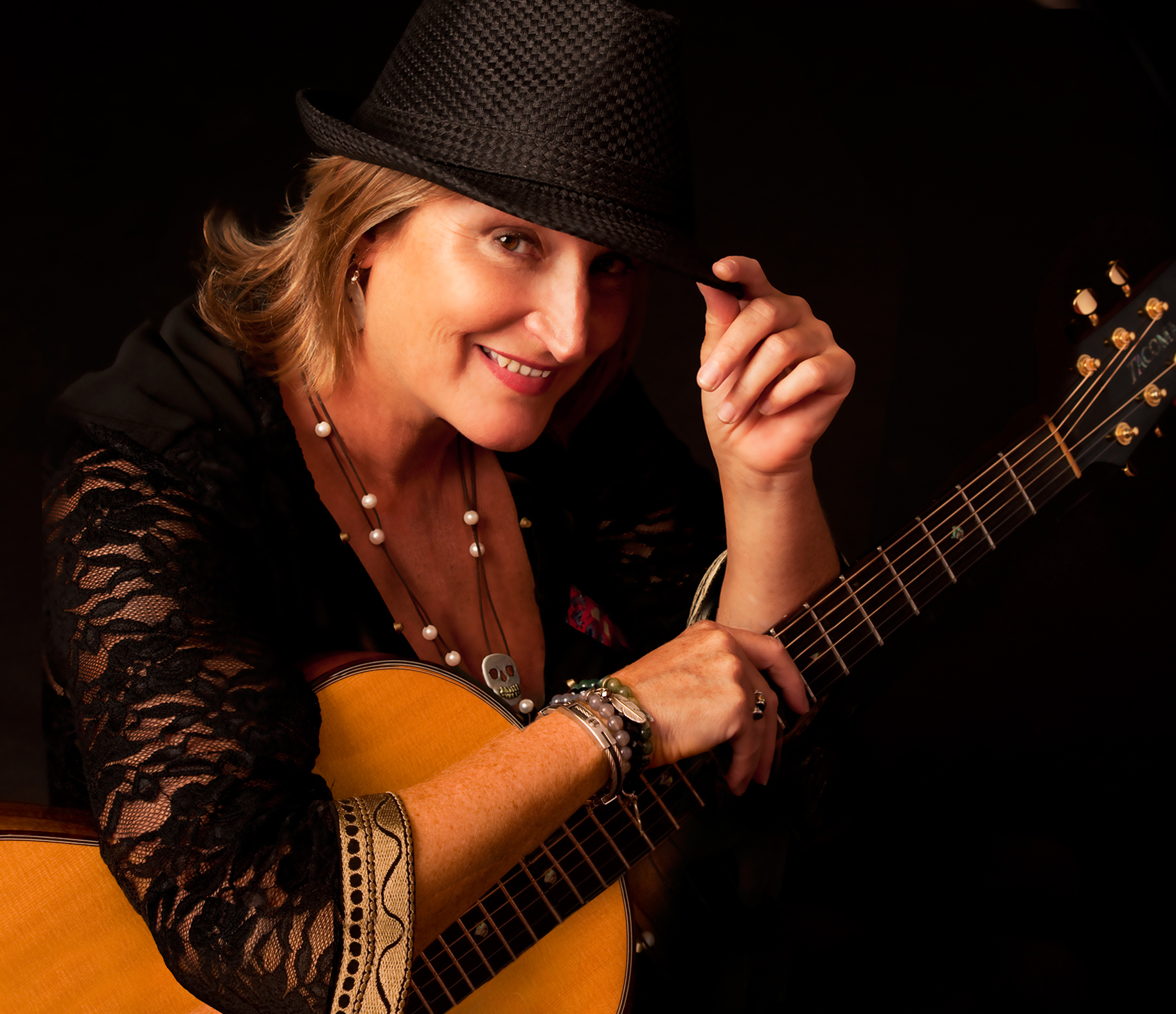

Background information
- Born: May 15, 1959 (age 67); Deer Park, Alabama, United States
- Genres: Rock, blues rock
- Occupations: Musician, songwriter
- Instruments: Vocals, guitar
- Years active: 1991–present
- Label: Dixiefrog
- Website: bjscott.com

Beverly Jo Scott (born May 15, 1959), also known as B. J. Scott, is an American-born singer-songwriter living in Brussels, Belgium.

== Biography ==
Born in Deer Park, Alabama, Beverly Jo Scott grew up nearby in Bay Minette, where, as a teen, she began singing.

She moved to New Orleans, Louisiana, then to California and, ultimately, in 1982, to Europe after a trip to Brussels, Belgium, resulted in her living there.

== Music career ==
In Europe, she has regularly performed in France and Germany at festivals and large music halls. In 2010, she performed Planet Janis, a touring tribute show to Janis Joplin. She also released Swamp Cabaret, a one-woman multimedia show focusing on the Gulf Coast.

In June 2011, after living 30 years abroad, Scott performed in her home state of Alabama at the Saenger Theatre in Mobile, as part of a Live at Space concert series.

In September 2011, Chickfest's featured artists included Scott, who Press-Register Entertainment described as building "a thriving career in Belgium over the last three decades, but maintains a legion of fans back home, thanks to the earthy passion of her music."

She co-wrote "Rhythm Inside" with Loïc Nottet, who represented Belgium with this song in the Eurovision Song Contest 2015.

== Radio and television work ==
Scott has been a coach on The Voice Belgique, the French-speaking Belgian version of the singing competition franchise The Voice, since its beginning in November 2011, except for seasons 8 and 12, making her the longest serving coach on the show's history. She coached the winners of seasons 5 (Laura Cartesiani), 9 (Jérémie Makiese), 10 (Alec Golard), and 11 (Emma Sorgato).

Scott also hosts BJ's Sunday Brunch, a radio show, on Sundays from 12 p.m. to 1 p.m., on Brussels-based French-speaking radio station Classic 21.

In 2023, Scott was a guest celebrity in the episode Les incontournables of the Belgian French-language reality television series Drag Race Belgique broadcast on the Tipik.

== Discography ==
- Honey and Hurricanes (1991)
- Mudcakes (1993)
- The Wailing Trail (1995)
- Amnesty for Eve (1999)
- Selective Passion (2000)
- Divine Rebel (2003)
- Cut and Run (2005)
- Dix Vagues (2008)
- Planet Janis (2010)
- Collection (2012)
- Swamp Cabaret (2014)
