= Selfocracy =

Studio album by Loïc Nottet
- Released: 31 March 2017
- Genre: Electropop
- Language: English
- Label: Sony
- Producer: Luuk Cox; Alexandre Germys; ICO; Nottet; Oddefellow; soFly and Nius

Loïc Nottet chronology
Selfocracy (2017)	Candy (2019)

Loïc Nottet studio album chronology
Selfocracy (2017)	Sillygomania (2020)

Singles from Selfocracy
- 1. "Million Eyes" Released: 27 October 2016; 2. "Mud Blood" Released: 17 March 2017

Selfocracy is the debut studio album by Belgian singer Loïc Nottet. It was released in digital and physical formats on 31 March 2017 by Sony Music Entertainment. Nottet rose to fame in 2014 when participating in The Voice Belgique and went on to finish fourth during the 2015 Eurovision Song Contest with "Rhythm Inside". For his debut album, Nottet wanted creative control and wrote some of the material by himself, while collaborating with writer Amy Morrey and producer Alexandre Germys on a majority of the songs. When composing music, Nottet would watch films without sound for inspiration, specifically Beauty and the Beast (1946), Changeling (2008), and Alice in Wonderland (2010). An electropop album influenced by genres including hip hop, experimental music and pop rock, Selfocracy features Nottet lyrically expressing his vision of modern society and addresses topics including toleration, harassment, stereotypes, narcissism, egocentrism and egoism. The singer himself described Selfocracy as a concept album and cited the mirror as a symbol for the entire record.

Music critics met the album with universal acclaim, praising the lyrics, the songs' construction, and Nottet's vocal delivery and maturity. Some indicated "Poision" as one of the best tracks on the album. Musically, reviewers noted the influence of several artists on the album, including Sia, Taylor Swift and Rihanna. Commercially, Selfocracy experienced success and reached number one in Wallonia, as well as the top ten in Flanders, France and Romandie. It was awarded Platinum by the Belgian Entertainment Association (BEA) in Belgium, as well as Gold by the Syndicat National de l'Édition Phonographique (SNEP) in France. For promotion, two singles preceded the album—"Million Eyes" (2016) and "Mud Blood" (2017)—which were successful in the aforementioned territories. Nottet also launched his Selfocracy Tour, which ran from 2017 to 2018 and visited the United Kingdom, Russia, Luxembourg, Switzerland, the Netherlands and Germany.

== Background and release ==
Belgian singer Loïc Nottet rose to fame after finishing second in singing competition The Voice Belgique in 2014. He then represented his country at the 2015 Eurovision Song Contest with his debut single "Rhythm Inside", and achieved fourth place. The singer also participated in and won the sixth season of French television dance contest Danse avec les stars in the same year. For Selfocracy, Nottet's debut studio album, he composed several songs by himself as he desired to have creative control over the record. He also collaborated with writer Amy Morrey and producer Alexandre Germys on a great majority of the album's material, which was recorded at the ICP and Synosound Studios in Brussels, Belgium, as well as at the Rooftop Studio in London, United Kingdom. When creating songs, Nottet would complete a basic instrumentation with his desired sounds, and then reach out to professional producers to "put the nail polish" in accordance to his vision. During an interview, the singer stated that this process took him a year and a half. The first song to be composed for Selfocracy was "Mud Blood". The album was originally planned to be called The Reign of Selfocracy, but its title was shortened "at the last minute". Nottet detailed:

"To find the title of the album, I put together all its songs and realized that they were mostly a call for tolerance. I wanted to summarize the current society—which I believe is rather egocentric, narcissistic and selfish—in a single word. So I started from the word 'democracy' and, as I did some Latin, I knew that 'cratia' means power. I then looked for a word in English that meant 'myself' and I got to "selfcracy". And then a friend of mine who is British told me that if I had been British, too, I would have added an 'o' because it sounds better. And that's why I chose Selfocracy."

Prior to its official premiere, excerpts of Selfocracy had been leaked online. In February 2017, an event was held at Éléphant Paname in Paris, France, where 30 people were given the chance to exclusively listen to unmastered mixes intended for the album. Selfocracy was ultimately released for digital download in various countries, as well as on CD in France on 31 March 2017, although 24 March 2017 was originally announced as its release date. A vinyl was also made available on 15 September 2017. All aforementioned releases were conducted by Sony Music Entertainment. Nottet originally envisioned the album's accompanying cover artwork to solely consist of symbols but—due to the disagreement of Sony Music Entertainment—it ended featuring a shot of him. Unveiled on 1 March 2017 through social media, the artwork portrays Nottet in a dark setting, lying on the ground in front of a mirror and looking off in the far distance.

== Music and lyrics ==
Selfocracy has been classified as an electropop album, with its instrumentation consisting of electronic beats, deep bass and percussion. Songs also occasionally feature choirs and rap vocals. Lyrically, Nottet expresses his vision of modern society and addresses topics such as toleration, harassment, stereotypes, narcissism, egocentrism and egoism. Nottet stated that "people are paying more and more attention to their appearance", and cited "the mirror"—also present on the album's cover artwork—as a significant symbol for Selfocracy. During an interview, he described it as a concept album. The singer also called it "cinematographic", attributing this to the way he composes songs. He notes watching movies without sound when coming up with melodies; the tracks "Million Eyes", "Selfocracy" and "Wolves" were inspired by Changeling (2008), Alice in Wonderland (2010) and Beauty and the Beast (1946), respectively. Nottet also stated that "I love my childhood, I do not want to grow up, so stories are very important in creation". Selfocracy is completely written in English, for which the singer penned lyrics in French and gave them to a British friend to translate.

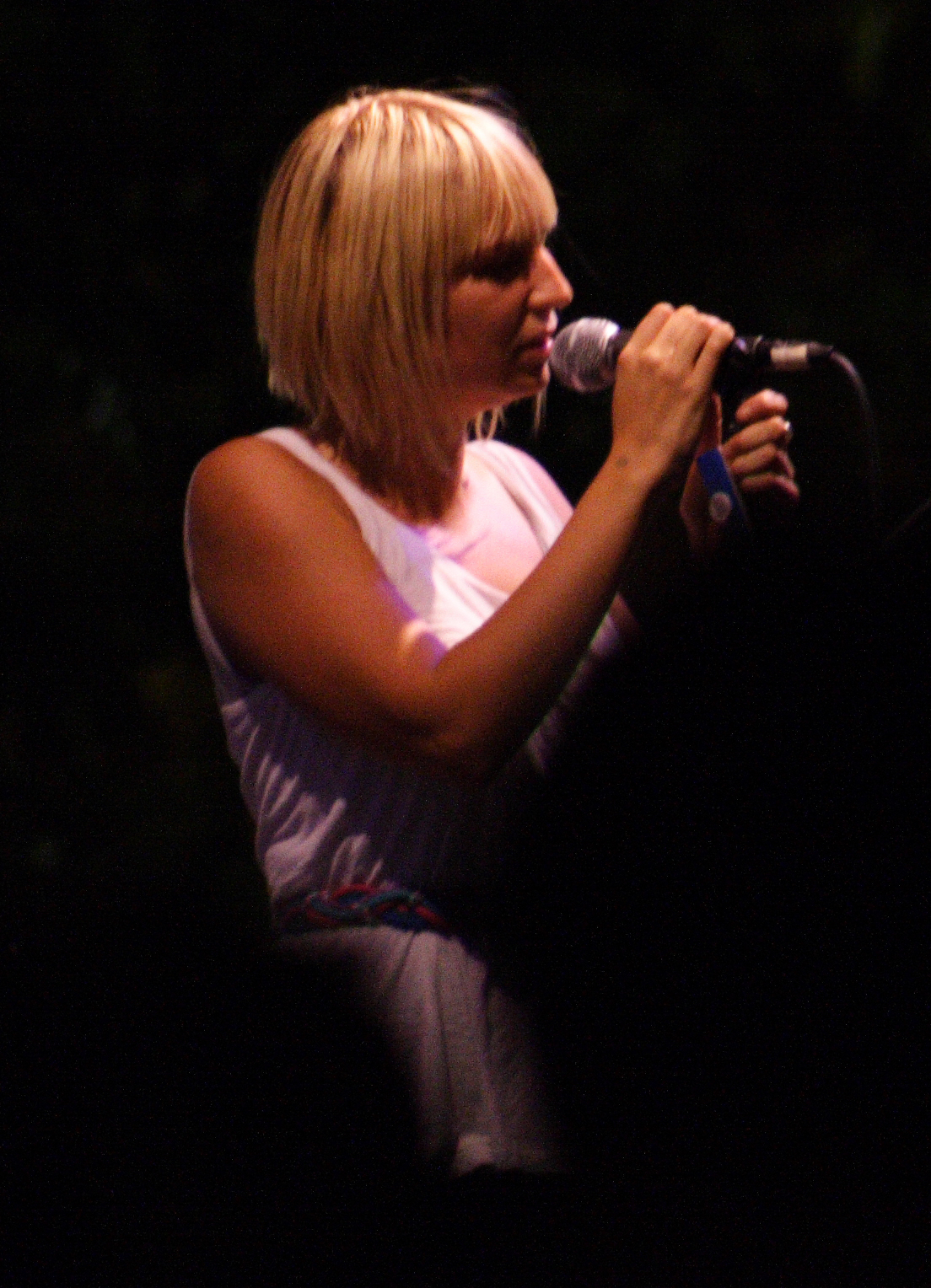
Music critics identified Australian singer Sia as an influence on the songs "Million Eyes" and "Mirror". Nottet himself also stated that she was one of his favorite acts during interviews.

The album opens with its title track, a "symphonic ballad", which features recording artist Blaise Landsbert-Noon talking about mirrors and reflections over "dark but stirring" music. He also tells myths of people who "would have died looking at themselves too long in a mirror", lyrically referencing the narcissist and egoist society surrounding him. The follow-up "Mud Blood" is a 1980s and rock-inspired electropop song that prominently features synthesizers in its refrain. Its "evocative" lyrics discuss on the presence of demons inside people. "Team8", the third song on Selfocracy, is a pop recording where Nottet advises the listener to become part of the 'team8'. Nottet also references social media and "the fact that humans are becoming more and more prisoners". An editor of Newsmonkey likened "Team8" to material released by Taylor Swift and One Direction. "Team8" is followed by the hip hop-inspired "Dirty" which commences as a lullaby and features a music box beat. It includes vocals from American rapper Lil Trip. Lucie Kosmala of Madmoizelle found the song to be "innocent" and "childlike", while an editor of Newsmonkey likened it to material released by Swift, Pink and Katy Perry. Julien Goncalves of Pure Charts associated the lyrics of "Dirty" with the bullying Nottet was exposed to during his childhood.

The fifth track on Selfocracy, "Million Eyes", has been described as an experimental-inspired dark electropop power ballad; its instrumentation features piano notes that are "wrapped in a hazy aura". Throughout the track's lyrics, Nottet speaks of 'million eyes' watching and "forcing him to put on a fake smile as a mask", with a reviewer considering the lyrics also discussed internal battles. Nottet himself explained that "Million Eyes" was inspired by the work of Sia, while critics also noticed the influence of Rihanna, The Weeknd and Alice on the Roof. "Whisperers" is a "progressive" ballad featuring a "whispering" sound. Lyrically, Notett speaks of death in a "mysterious, almost religious" atmosphere. Newsmonkey likened it to material released by Evanescence. Subsequently, the hip hop and electropop-inspired pop rock song "Poison" is introduced, featuring rapper Shogun. The track opens with an approximately one-minute long, avant garde-influenced instrumental section. Towards the track's end electric guitars are introduced, prompting a critic to compare their use to that of Imagine Dragons. Other inspirations for the song identified by a Newsmonkey editor are Rihanna and Lady Gaga. On "Poison", Nottet executes several "completely controlled" vocal trills, while lyrically detailing on criticism from individuals which causes his "conscience [to be] poisoned".

"Cure", the eighth song on Selfocracy, has been described as a piano-driven "love letter" to music, which Nottet himself considered a therapy. The track is followed by "Wolves" with British singer Raphaella, featuring them performing a combination of singing and howling. Its instrumentation contains "light" percussion. Critics labelled "Hungry Heart" a pop song and noticed the inclusion of several guitar riffs. In an interview, Nottet stated that the recording lyrically represents a love song between a human and its reflection. Recording artist Landsbert-Noon speaks for a second and last time on "Peculiar and Beautiful" over a "dramatic" background. He content-wise references Selfocracy's opening title track, and advises listeners to "reflect again on [their] excessive use of mirrors". Lyrics include: "Be you/Simply you/ That'll be enough/Believe me". Closing Selfocracy, the "dramatic" "Mirror" includes "subtle links" to other songs from the album. In the lyrics, Nottet encourages the listener to "break that glass" and not let reflections overrule them. Goncalves of Pure Charts compared the track to the work of Sia.

== Critical reception ==
Music critics had positive reviews for Selfocracy. Kosmala of Mademoizelle stated: "[The album] touches by its sincerity, and impresses with the vocal capacities of Nottet which manage to create a separate and captivating atmosphere." Steven Bellery, writing for RTL, also praised Nottet's "androgynous" voice, while referring to the album as a "dark, chimerical, lyrical universe". Alongside commending the singer's delivery, Lucie Valais of RTL2 identified "lyrical flights, poetry and powerful melodies". An editor for Virgin Radio praised the songs' production and Nottet's maturity, while picking "Poision" as the highlight from Selfocracy. Le Parisien's Éric Bureau thought that the "maturity" and "darkness" of the writing on the album was reminiscent to that of Marina Kaye, while Newsmonkey found that Nottet's love of horror films reflected on the album's material.

Christophe Segard of website Aficia gave Selfocracy four-and-a-half points out of five, and wrote: "Dark, intense, tortured, raw... [...] 12 titles perfectly produced, an authentic album [that shows] maturity [and] great darkness, but which does not cause addiction." In another article, Segard listed the album track "Poison" in his 2017 in 10 Tracks list. Giving the album ten out of ten points and picking "Mud Blood" as its best track, Antranig Shokayan of Wiwibloggs concluded: "It is difficult to find a weak link as each song stands on its own and they come together to form a perfect collection". Melty ranked the album at number three in their Best Pop Albums of the Year list, following Number 1 Angel by Charli XCX and Melodrama by Lorde. Jonathan Currinn of website CelebMix labelled Selfocracy as one of his favorite albums of 2017, and praised Nottet's vocal delivery as well as the contributions of the featuring artists. Currinn concluded: "Every single track on this album is complete and impressive. They're all uniquely catchy and show Nottet's versatility. [...] This is a faultless debut album".

== Promotion and commercial performance ==
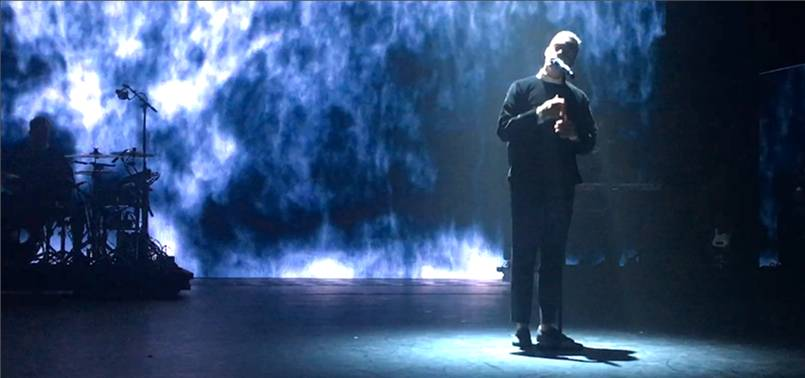
Nottet performing in Belgium in April 2017 during his Selfocracy Tour

Selfocracy was aided by two singles—"Million Eyes" and "Mud Blood"—released on 27 October 2016 and 17 March 2017, respectively. Alongside several live performances, both benefited from a music video. Commercially, "Million Eyes" peaked at number two in Wallonia and five in France, and was certified Gold by the Belgian Entertainment Association (BEA) and Diamond by the Syndicat National de l'Édition Phonographique (SNEP), respectively. "Mud Blood" achieved minor success in Wallonia. For further promotion, Nottet also launched his Selfocracy Tour, which ran for over one year from 22 April 2017 to 2 August 2018. The singer predominantly performed in France and Belgium, alongside venues in the United Kingdom, Russia, Luxembourg, Switzerland, the Netherlands and Germany.

The album experienced commercial success on its release. In Belgium, it debuted at number one in Wallonia and at number three in Flanders. In the first territory, it stayed on the Ultratop chart for 68 weeks, of which six were atop the ranking. Selfocracy ended 2017 as the best-selling record in Wallonia, and was certified Platinum by the BEA for over 30,000 units sold. In France, the album debuted at number six with 7,706 in first-week sales. It went on to spend 18 weeks in the country's SNEP chart, and managed to move over 25,000 copies by December 2017. It was later certified Gold. Selfocracy further charted at number 20 in Switzerland, and reached number five in the country's Romandie region.

== Track listing ==
Credits adapted from the liner notes of Selfocracy.

No.	Title	Writer(s)	Producer(s)	Length
1.	"Selfocracy"	Nottet	Nottet	3:06
2.	"Mud Blood"	Amy Morrey; Nottet	Alexandre Germys	3:04
3.	"Team8"	Morrey; Nottet	Luuk Cox	3:23
4.	"Dirty" (featuring Lil Trip)	Yannis Borrey; Morrey; Nottet	Oddefellow; soFly and Nius	3:40
5.	"Million Eyes"	Morrey; Nottet	Cox	4:13
6.	"Whisperers"	Morrey; Nottet	Germys	3:05
7.	"Poison" (featuring Shogun)	Morrey; Nottet; Shogun	Germys	6:39
8.	"Cure"	Morrey; Nottet	Germys	4:13
9.	"Wolves" (featuring Raphaella)	Morrey; Nottet	ICO	3:18
10.	"Hungry Heart"	Morrey; Nottet	Germys	3:12
11.	"Peculiar and Beautiful"	Nottet	Nottet	2:00
12.	"Mirror"	Morrey; Nottet	Germys	5:08

== Personnel ==
Credits adapted from the liner notes of Selfocracy.

- Atanas Babaleski – Pro Tools engineer
- Isabelle Baleanu-Perisson – executive producer
- Jean-François Berger – keyboards
- Vincent Blaviel – A&R
- Nick Built – backing vocals
- Lionel Capouillez – mixing
- Gauthier Carbonneaux – mixing
- Charlie RG – keyboards
- Eric Chevet – mastering
- Luuk Cox – synthesizers, bass
- Zeb Daemen – photography
- Michel "Chelle" Dierickx – recording
- Jean-Pierre Dréau – A&R
- Han van Eijk – backing vocals
- F.A.M.E.'S. Project – choir vocals
- Allan François – guitar
- Alexandre Germys – synthesizers
- Lo van Gorp – backing vocals
- Mélody Grillot – executive producer
- Alex "Cores" Hayes – recording
- Georgii Hristovski – sound engineer
- Dan Lacksman – mixing
- Blaise Landsbert-Noon – speaking voice
- Paul Edouard Laurendeau – recording
- Ken Lewis – mixing
- Lil Trip – featured artist, vocals
- Dan Lacksman – recording
- Loïc Nottet – vocals, synthesizers, additional programming
- Oddefellow – programming
- Jody Pijper – backing vocals
- Raphaella – featured artist, vocals
- Pim Roos – backing vocals
- Dian Senders – backing vocals
- Shogun – featured artist, vocals
- SoFly and Nius – programming
- Sébastien Wery – piano

== Charts ==
=== Weekly charts ===
Chart (2017)	Peak position
Belgian Albums (Ultratop Flanders)	3
Belgian Albums (Ultratop Wallonia)	1
French Albums (SNEP)	6
Swiss Albums (Schweizer Hitparade)	20
Swiss Romandie Albums (Schweizer Hitparade)	5

=== Year-end charts ===
Chart (2017)	Position
Belgian Albums (Ultratop Flanders)	70
Belgian Albums (Ultratop Wallonia)	1
French Albums (SNEP)	117
Chart (2018)	Position
Belgian Albums (Ultratop Wallonia)	192

== Certifications and sales ==
Region	Certification	Certified units/sales
Belgium (BRMA)	Platinum	30,000^{‡}
France (SNEP)	Gold	25,000
^{‡} Sales+streaming figures based on certification alone.

== Release history ==
Region	Date	Format	Label
Various	31 March 2017	Digital download	Sony
France	31 March 2017	CD	Sony
Various	15 September 2017	Vinyl	Sony
