= Sillygomania =

Studio album by Loïc Nottet
- Released: 29 May 2020
- Label: Sony Music
- Producer: Skydancers; Alex Germys; Sacha Skarbek; Ozhora Miyagi; Twenty 9

Loïc Nottet studio album chronology
Selfocracy (2017)	Sillygomania (2020)

Singles from Sillygomania
- 1. "Doctor" Released: 30 October 2017; 2. "On Fire" Released: 30 November 2018; 3. "29" Released: 5 June 2019; 4. "Heartbreaker" Released: 19 February 2020; 5. "Mr/Mme" Released: 17 April 2020; 6. "Twym" Released: 31 July 2020

Sillygomania is the second studio album by Belgian singer Loïc Nottet. It was released on 29 May 2020 by Sony Music. The album includes the singles "Doctor", "On Fire", "29", "Heartbreaker", "Mr/Mme" and "Twym".

== Background ==
In February 2020, Nottet announced his new album on his Instagram account, he said, "And here it is! I'm so happy to present to you all the cover of my new album: SILLYGOMANIA! I know that many of you have been waiting a long time for this and I really hope that this appetizer will live up to your expectations! Thank you for your patience and dedication to my team and I ! I can never thank you enough for the chance and the life you have given me!".

== Track listing ==
Sillygomania track listing
No.	Title	Writer(s)	Producer(s)	Length
1.	"Sillygomania"	Amy Morrey; Loïc Nottet; Leo Nocta		2:34
2.	"On Fire"	Nottet; Sacha Skarbek	Skydancers	3:47
3.	"Heartbreaker"	Nottet; Amy Morrey	Skydancers; Alex Germys	3:56
4.	"Rosa Maria"	Nottet; Sacha Skarbek	Skydancers; Alex Germys	3:44
5.	"Liar"	Alex Germys; Amy Morrey; Nottet	Skydancers; Alex Germys	3:30
6.	"29"	Nottet; Skarbek	Skarbek	3:57
7.	"The One"	Alex Germys; Amy Morrey; Nottet	Alex Germys	4:04
8.	"Doctor"	Nottet; Morrey	Ozhora Miyagi; Twenty 9	3:58
9.	"Gun"	Amy Morrey; Jeann. M; Nottet		4:23
10.	"Twym"	Nottet; Sacha Skarbek	Skydancers; Ken Lewis	3:27
11.	"Cry Out"	Amy Morrey; Dimitri Tikovoi; Nottet		4:04
12.	"Candy"	Alex Germys; Amy Morrey; Nottet	Alex Germys	3:43
13.	"Farewell"	Amy Morrey; Nottet; Leo Nocta		3:18
14.	"Mr/Mme"	Nottet; Leo Nocta	Leo Nocta	6:21

== Charts ==
=== Weekly charts ===
Weekly chart performance for Sillygomania
Chart (2020)	Peak position
Belgian Albums (Ultratop Flanders)	9
Belgian Albums (Ultratop Wallonia)	1
French Albums (SNEP)	31
Swiss Albums (Schweizer Hitparade)	50

=== Year-end charts ===
2020 year-end chart performance for Sillygomania
Chart (2020)	Position
Belgian Albums (Ultratop Wallonia)	24

2021 year-end chart performance for Sillygomania
Chart (2021)	Position
Belgian Albums (Ultratop Wallonia)	159

== Release history ==
Region	Date	Format	Label
Various	29 May 2020	Digital download; streaming	Sony Music
