= Shameboy =

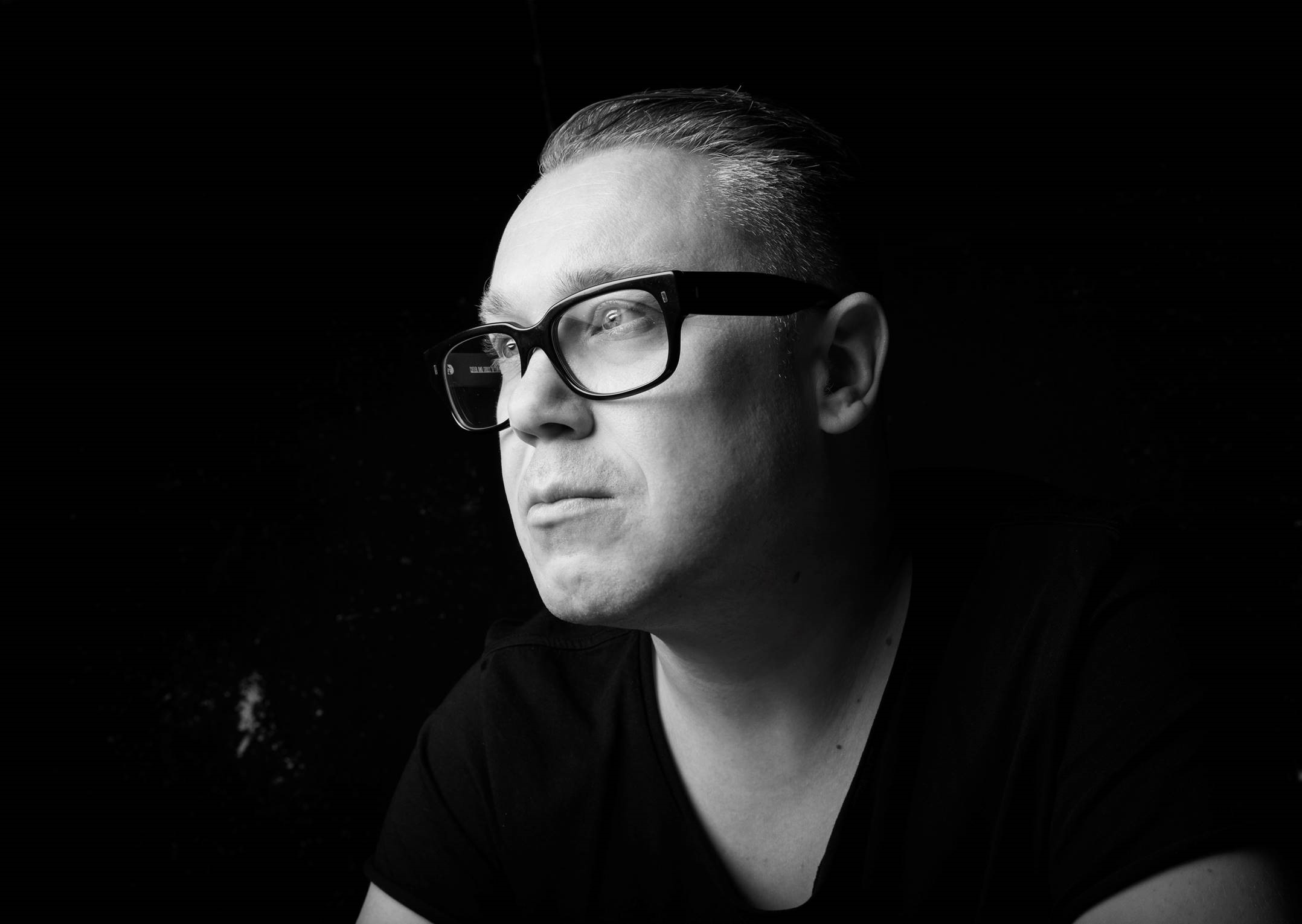
- Luuk Cox in 2016

Background information
- Born: Luuk Paul Cox; 3 August 1972 (age 53); Kerkrade, Limburg, Netherlands
- Genres: Electronic, pop
- Occupations: Record producer, musician, remixer
- Instruments: Drums, keyboards, percussion, guitar, piano

Shameboy is the one-man project of Luuk Cox (born 3 August 1972 in Kerkrade, Limburg), a Belgian, Dutch-born multi-instrumentalist music producer, musician and songwriter. His writing and production credits include Stromae, Loic Nottet, Racoon, Emma Bale, Arsenal, Cattle & Cane, Innerspace Orchestra, Girls in Hawaii, Molly, Maaike Ouboter, Eva De Roovere, Tim Vanhamel, Mickey, Roscoe, Ostyn, Team William, Marco Z and Compact Disk Dummies amongst many others. Luuk Cox remixed tracks for artists like WILL.I.AM, Nicki Minaj and Booka Shade.

After moving to Belgium, Luuk Cox became drummer of Buscemi, a DJ producer and live performance act of electronic dance music with influences of Latino, House, Jazz, Afrobeat, Brazilian and Drum and Bass. In 2004, Luuk Cox and Belgian DJ Jimmy Dewit created Shameboy, an eclectic electronic music project inspired by Kraftwerk and Chemical Brothers. As a duo, they recorded 3 albums. In 2010, Dewit left Shameboy and was replaced during live shows by Dominik Friede.

== Production / Writing / Co-Production ==
- The Signal – Compact Disk Dummies (2024)
- Falling off the Earth – Slow Pilot (2024)
- Liquid Love – Intergalactic Lovers (2022)
- Formidabile – Malika Ayane (2021)
- On The Run / All Night – Noémie Wolfs (2020)
- The Long Now – SJ Hoffman (2019)
- Death Is A Woman – Phillip Boa And The Voodooclub (2017)
- Team 8 – Loic Nottet (2017)
- Look Ahead – Racoon (2017)
- Curaçao – Emma Bale (2017)
- Million Eyes – Loic Nottet (2016)
- I'm Not Lost – Tom Frantzis (2016)
- Silver Souls – Compact Disk Dummies (2016)
- Rhythm Inside – Loic Nottet (2015)
- En Hoe Het Dan Ook Weer Dag Wordt – Maaike Ouboter (2015)
- Mont Royal – Roscoe (2015)
- Drama – Team William (2015)
- Bibles EP – Bibles (2015)
- Smoke Behind The Sound – My Little Cheap Dictaphone (2014)
- No South of the South Pole – Ostyn (2014)
- Viert – Eva De Roovere (2013)
- Stromae - papaoutai (2013)
- Everest – Girls in Hawaii (2013)
- Ta fête – Stromae (2013)
- If You Go Away – Tout va bien (2013)
- The Ordinary Life of Marco Z – Marco Z (2012)
- Pushing – Andy (2012)
- Fysl – Fysl (2011)
- Familiar Sounds – Buffoon (2010)
- Far Away Look – Krakow (2009)
- Hot Shot – Nudex (2009)
- Raise Cain – Roadburg (2009)
- The Nicholsons – The Nicholsons (2009)
- High Speed Killer Ride – Waxdolls (2009)
- God Save The King – Marcus (2008)
- Nailpin Iii – Nailpin (2008)
- Sinner Songs – The Rones (2008)
- As The Heart Is – Krakow (2007)
- Bonfini – Lottergirls (2007)
- Nonsense & Crackwhores – The Rones (2007)
- Welcome to the Blue House – Tim Vanhamel (2007)
- Horns, Halos And Mobile Phones – Horns (2006)
- Outsides – Arsenal (2005)
- Before The Dawn – Antal Walgrave (2002)

== Remixes ==
- Peace Or Violence (Shameboy Remix) – Stromae (2013)
- Betamax (Shameboy Remix) – Big Black Delta (2012)
- Tomorrow Belongs To Us (Shameboy Remix) – Booka Shade (2012)
- Goodbye Elvis (Shameboy Remix) – Doc Trashz & Shameboy (2012)
- Morphosis (Shameboy Remix) – Shaved Monkeys (2012)
- Zefix (Shameboy Remix) – Bobble (2011)
- Here Comes (Shameboy Remix) – Foamo (2011)
- Poisson Vert (Shameboy Remix) – Nobody Beats The Drum &... (2011)
- The More That I Do (Shameboy Remix) – Sharam Jej (2011)
- Suave (Shameboy Remix) – Super Super (2011)
- Check It Out (Shameboy Remix) – WILL.I.AM., Nicki Minaj (2010)
- Nukes of Hazard (Shameboy Remix) – Boemklatsch Ft. Mike Lord (2010)
- Transient (Shameboy Remix) – Clash The Disko Kids (2010)
- Deep Throat (Shameboy Remix) – Distrakkt (2010)
- Losing Control (Shameboy Remix) -Jaimie Fanatic (2010)
- Scream (Shameboy Remix) – Kelis (2010)
- Mario Is Under Acid (Shameboy Remix) – Mr Magnetik (2010)
- Out of Control (Shameboy Remix) – S-File (2010)
- Strobot (Netsky Remix) – Netsky (2010)
- Alors on Danse (Shameboy Remix) – Stromae (2010)
- House'Llelujah (Shameboy Remix) – Stromae (2010)
- Peppermint (Shameboy Remix) – Plastic Operator (2008)
- Sahib Balkan (Shameboy Remix) – Buscemi (2007)
- Bonfini (Shameboy Remix) – Lottergirls (2007)

== Shameboy (as) ==
- Be With You – Shameboy (2015)
- All-in For You – Shameboy (2014)
- Trippin – Shameboy (2014)
- 808 State of Mind – Shameboy (2010)
- At The Pyramid Marquee – Shameboy (2008)
- Heartcore – Shameboy (2007)
- Hi, Lo And in Between (2006)
