= Puremédias =

French website devoted to news and entertainment media

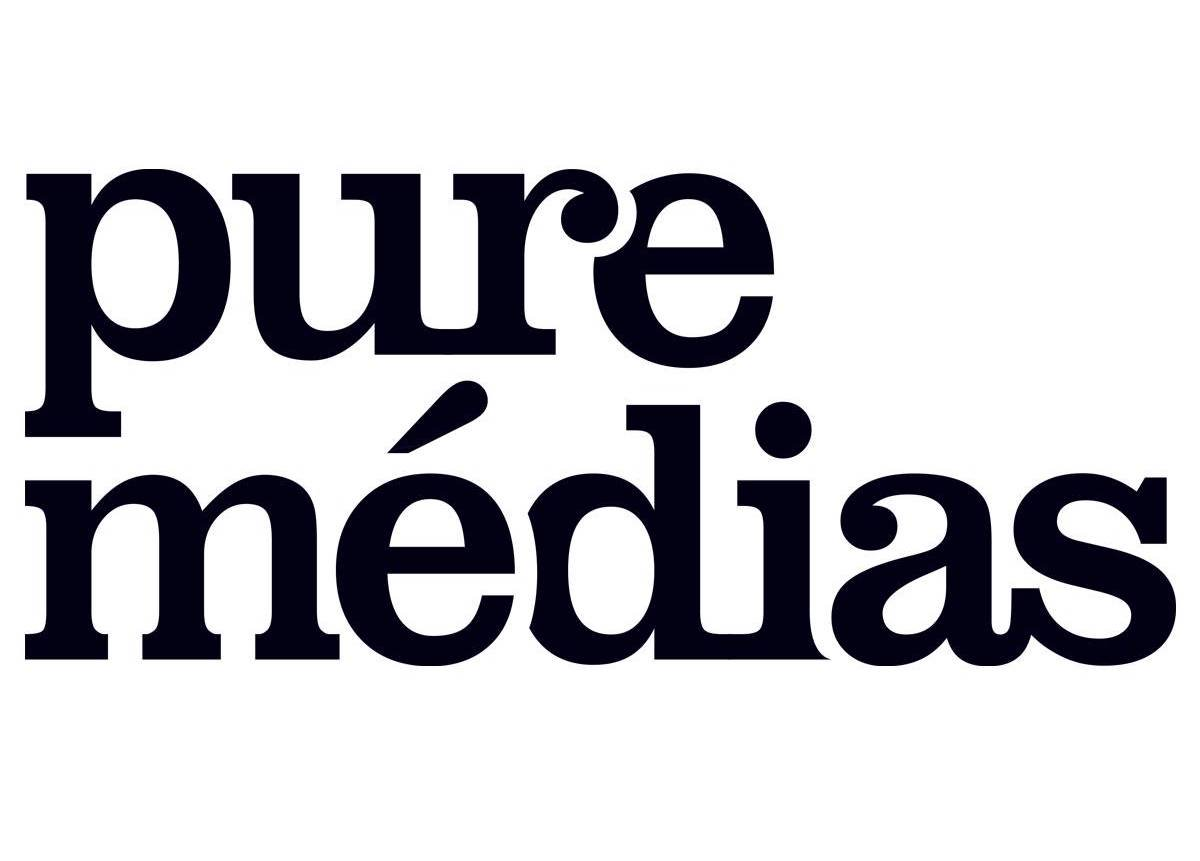
- Website type: Entertainment news
- Available in: French
- Owner: Webedia
- Website: www.ozap.com
- Registration: Optional
- Launched: December 2002
- Current status: Active

Puremédias, formerly named imedias.biz until April 2008, and Ozap from April 2008 to January 2011, is a French website devoted to news and entertainment media.

== History ==
imedias.biz was created in December 2002 as a bimonthly webzine in the free hosting from Internet service provider Free.

Then in November 2004, the site turned into a media portal, including the publication of briefs (including the results of médiamétrie), articles and interviews. In September 2005, news related to films were added.

In September 2006 a new version was launched, including a system of files records on films, series, shows or personalities from the media universe.

In September 2007, imedias.biz associated with Cyréalis and had a permanent editorial.

In April 2008, imedias.biz became Ozap.com. Then the website content was divided into four sections: "media", "cinema", "music" and "series". In addition to its many files records, Ozap.com also aimed to develop interactivity with its readers and new services (television programs, movie times, compare prices and pre-listening music tracks or movie trailers). In June 2010, a new version of the site was launched with more photographs.

In January 2011, Ozap.com changed its name after the arrival of Webédia group in its capital and become Puremédias.

== Slogans ==
- November 2004: « Imédias, en long. en large. en décryptage. »
- 2004 - 2006 : « Imédias, toujours + de médias »
- 2006 - 2008 : « Imédias, toujours plus de médias »
- 2008 - Août 2009 : « Ozap par imédias »
- August 2009 - June 2010 : « Ozap ils en parlent tous »
- June 2010 - January 2011 : « OZAP : Buzz et Actu TV »
- From January 2011 : « PureMédias by Ozap »

== Capital ==
Ozap.com is published by "The News Box", which is 50% owned by founder journalists and 50% by Cyréalis, which was absorbed in the spring of 2008 by M6net, a subsidiary of M6.

In December 2010, "through a mutual agreement" between the founders of the site and M6, the group Web"dia, editor of the PuprePeople site, replaced M6net as owner of the site.

== Competition ==
Ozap.com is the main competitor of jeanmarcmorandini.com, a blog by French TV and radio host Jean-Marc Morandini also specialized in media information.

In April 2008, Jean-Marc Morandini accused the site of bias as it was part of Cyréalis, which was then bought by M6, itself owned by RTL Group which also owns the station RTL, the main competitor of Europe 1, for which he worked.

In January 2009, Ozap.com said it attracted 909,000 visitors in November 2008 according to Médiamétrie/Nielsen Company, which ranking the site behind Programme-tv.net and Programme.tv and before Jean-Marc Morandini's blog. Citing "errors" although other media have confirmed this information, Jean-Marc Morandini claimed that his site continues to be "the first media blog in France". Médiamétrie specified that Morandini "mixed [...] figures that can't be compared", using in his favour two numbers calculated by different methods.
