= Loïc Nottet =

Belgian singer, songwriter and dancer (born 1996)

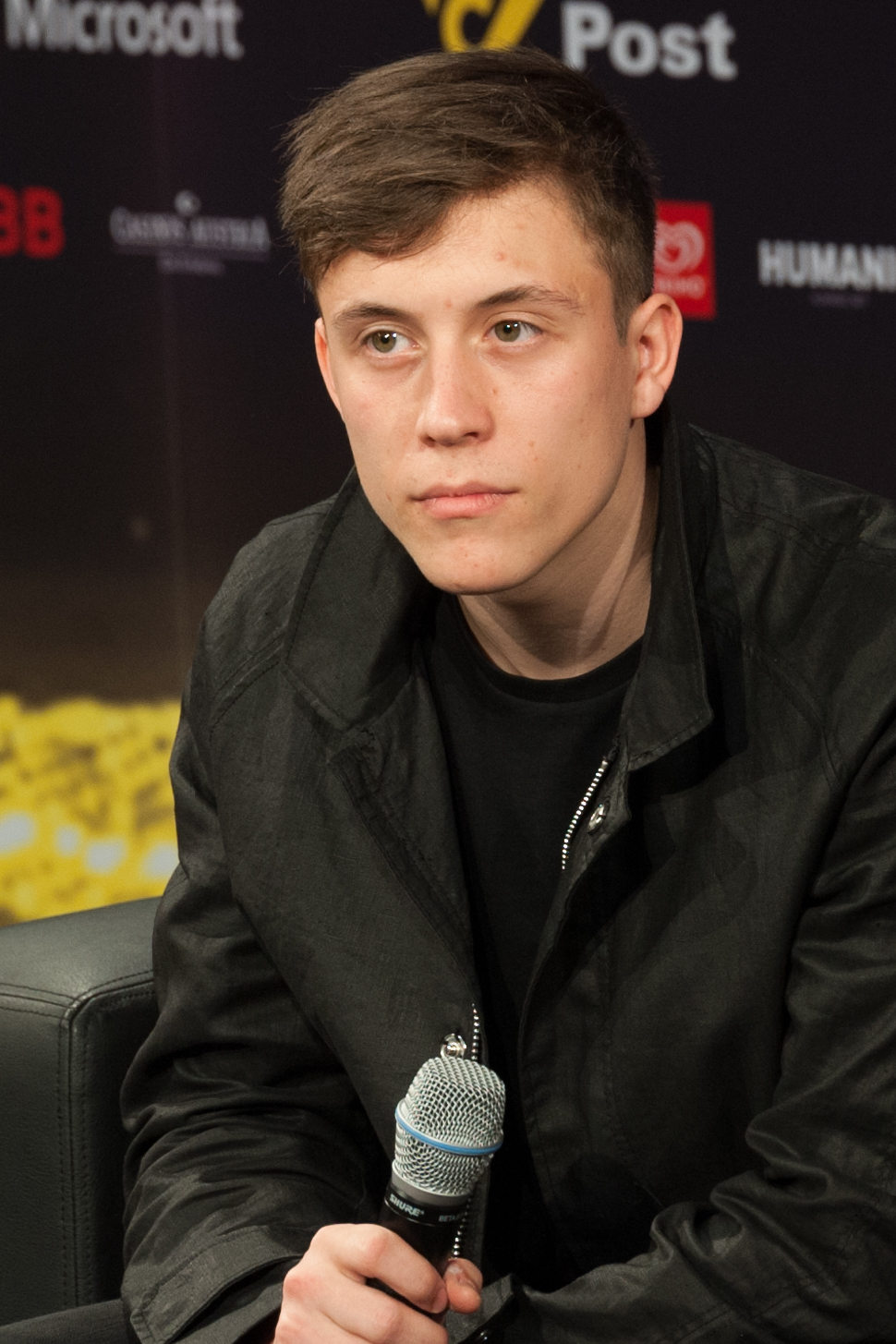
- Nottet in 2015

Background information
- Born: Loïc Jean-Pierre Nottet; 10 April 1996 (age 30); Charleroi, Wallonia, Belgium
- Genres: Electropop; synthpop
- Occupations: Singer; songwriter; dancer
- Instrument: Vocals
- Years active: 2014–present
- Label: Sony
- Website: loicnottet.com

Loïc Jean-Pierre Nottet (French pronunciation: [lɔik nɔtɛ]; born 10 April 1996) is a Belgian singer, songwriter and dancer. He began his career as a singer in the third season of The Voice Belgique in 2014 and represented Belgium in the Eurovision Song Contest 2015, where he placed fourth with his song "Rhythm Inside".

After the contest, he released "Million Eyes", the first single from his debut album Selfocracy, which later topped the charts in Belgium, reached number eight in France and number twenty in Switzerland. His second studio album Sillygomania was released on 29 May 2020.

== Music career ==
=== 2013–2015: The Voice Belgique and Eurovision Song Contest ===
Nottet auditioned for The Voice Belgique and reached second place in the final of the third season, behind the winner Pagna. He was in the team of B.J. Scott. He cited Imagine Dragons, Lana Del Rey, Sia and Dua Lipa as his inspirations.

==== List of songs performed on The Voice Belgique ====
Stage	Date	Song	Original artist	Notes
Blind auditions	28 January 2014	"Diamonds"	Rihanna	
Battle	18 March 2014	"Counting Stars"	OneRepublic	Duel won against Renata Skunczyk
Live	8 April 2014	"We Remain"	Christina Aguilera	
Live	15 April 2014	"I've Been Loving You Too Long"	Otis Redding	
Live	22 April 2014	"Love Me Again"	John Newman	
Live	29 April 2014	"Strong"	London Grammar	
Live	5 May 2014	"Happy"	Pharrell Williams	With Julie Carpino, Laurent Pagna and Boris Motte
Live	5 May 2014	"One"	U2	Duo with Beverly Jo Scott
Live	5 May 2014	"Ta fête"	Stromae	With Julie Carpino, Laurent Pagna and Boris Motte
Live	5 May 2014	"Paradise"	Noa Moon	With Julie Carpino and Noa Moon
Live	5 May 2014	"Applause"	Lady Gaga	
Live	5 May 2014	"Diamonds"	Rihanna	Runner-Up

On 3 November 2014, Belgium's French-language broadcaster, Radio Télévision Belge Francophone (RTBF), announced Nottet as the Belgian representative for the Eurovision Song Contest 2015 to be held in Vienna, Austria. On 10 March 2015, "Rhythm Inside", his entry for the Eurovision Song Contest 2015, was presented (co-written by his voice mentor). The song went to number one on both the Flanders and Wallonia Ultratop charts. Performing in the first semi final of the competition, Nottet was successful in progressing to the final, coming second in his semi final with 149 points. During the Jury Final (following Australia), he could be barely seen on stage due to heavy use of smoke machines and pyrotechnics from the Australian Act. His delegation was rumoured to have lodged a complaint about this, saying that it would affect part of their final score. While they requested to perform again, this was apparently denied, instead telling juries to disregard the smoke. In the Grand Final, the Belgian entry scored a total of 217 points leaving "Rhythm Inside" in fourth position overall, giving Belgium its first top five placement since 2003. It received the maximum 12 points from three countries; Netherlands, France and Hungary. The song was certified Platinum for selling 30,000 copies in Belgium. Nottet has released three different music videos for Rhythm Inside (including one called the "Alice in Nightmareland" version). After the contest, "Rhythm Inside" reached the top ten in the Austrian, Lithuanian and Russian Music Charts, achieving top 20 in Finland, Iceland and Sweden and also charting in Australia, UK, France, Switzerland and many more European countries. On 24 October 2015, he took part in and won the sixth season of the French TV show Danse avec les stars.

==== List of performances on Danse avec les stars (season 6) ====
Prime	Style	Music	Notes			Ranking	Result
Prime	Style	Music	Artistic	Technical	Total	Ranking	Result
1	Foxtrot	Homeless - Marina Kaye	31 (8,6,9,8)			2/10	No elimination
2 (Personal Story night)	Paso Doble	Thriller - Michael Jackson	36 (9,8,10,9)			1/10	Safe
3 (80's night)	Jive	Ça plane pour moi - Plastic Bertrand	37 (9,9,10,9)	35 (9,8,9,9)	72	1/9	Safe
4	Cancelled due to the November 2015 Paris attacks happening the night before						
5 (Mythic dances night)	Contemporary	Chandelier - Sia	39 (10,10,10,9)	38 (10,9,10,9)	77	2/8	Safe
5 (Mythic dances night)	Best lift	Waiting For Love - Avicii	+0		77	2/8	Safe
6 (Disney night)	Quickstep	Supercalifragilisticexpialidocious	39 (10,10,10,9)	36 (10,8,9,9)	100	3/7	Safe
6 (Disney night)	Samba relay	The Bare Necessities	+25		100	3/7	Safe
7 (Switch night)^{1}	Rumba	La superbe - Benjamin Biolay	45 (9,9,10,8,9)		79	3/6	Safe
7 (Switch night)^{1}	Cha-Cha-Cha^{2}	One More Time - Daft Punk	34 (8,6,7,4,9)		79	3/6	Safe
8	Rumba	Pour me comprendre - Véronique Sanson	36 (9,8,10,9)	32 (9,8,9,6)	145	1/6	Safe
8	Tango^{3}	Carmen - Stromae	39 (10,9,10,10)	38 (10,9,10,9)	145	1/6	Safe
9 (semifinal)	Contemporary^{4}	Le Lac des Cygnes - Pyotr Ilyich Tchaikovsky	29 (10,10,9)	28 (10,9,9)	135	1/4	Safe
9 (semifinal)	Cha-Cha-Cha	Can You Feel It - The Jacksons	40 (10,10,10,10)	38 (9,9,10,10)	135	1/4	Safe
10 (final)	Jazz Broadway	Don't Rain on My Parade - Lea Michele	40 (10,10,10,10)	40 (10,10,10,10)	160	1/3	Winner (68%)
10 (final)	Contemporary	Chandelier - Sia	40 (10,10,10,10)	40 (10,10,10,10)	160	1/3	Winner (68%)
10 (final)	Freestyle	Don't Stop Me Now – Queen	Unrated		160	1/3	Winner (68%)

1.With Candice Pascal instead of Denitsa Ikonomova.
1.Judges note + Public note.
2.Duo with EnjoyPhoenix & Christophe.
3.Trio with Silvia Notargiacomo.
4.Trio with Marie-Claude Pietragalla (who didn't note this dance).

==== List of performances on Danse avec les stars (after season 6) ====
Season	Prime	Style	Music	Notes			Ranking
Season	Prime	Style	Music	Artistic	Technical	Total	Ranking
7^{1}	8 (trio week)	Contemporary	"Runnin' (Lose It All)" - Naughty Boy Ft Beyoncé & Arrow Benjamin	38 (10,9,10,9)	36 (9,9,9,9)	74	1/5
Le Grand Show^{2}		Contemporary	"Chandelier" - Sia	40 (10,10,10,10)			1/12
10^{3}	5 (10 years special)	Freestyle	"Speed" - Zazie	35 (8,10,8,9)			1/7

1.Trio with Laurent Maistret & Denitsa Ikonomova.
2.Special prime after season 7.
3.Trio with Azize Diabaté & Denitsa Ikonomova.

=== 2016–2017: Selfocracy ===
Nottet's single "Million Eyes", part of his first album, was released on 27 October 2016. The video was filmed on 5 October 2016. Nottet announced the album would feature a concept, different characters and several music videos. The song charted at number two on the Wallonia Ultratop chart and number two in France. The song was certified gold in Belgium and France. On the evening of 1 March 2017, Nottet announced his debut album, titled Selfocracy. The album was released on 31 March and managed to top the chart in Belgian Albums (Ultratop Wallonia). It also charted at number three in Ultratop Flanders, number eight in France and number twenty in Switzerland.

On 22 and 23 April 2017, Nottet presented his first concerts after the release of Selfocracy. He performed two sold-out concerts in the Ancienne Belgique (l'AB) in Brussels.

Nottet won the Best Belgian Act category at the 2017 MTV Europe Music Awards which aired on 12 November 2017.

Throughout 2017, Nottet toured in Belgium, the UK, France, Germany and more in support of Selfocracy. The tour finished in early August 2018.

=== 2018–2022: Candy and Sillygomania ===
In October 2019, Nottet announced Candy, a Halloween-themed extended play. The EP was released on 31 October, alongside a musical short film of the same name, which premiered the same day on YouTube.

Nottet's second studio album, Sillygomania, was released on 29 May 2020.

In 2020, Nottet debuted as a coach on The Voice Belgique for the ninth season, over six years after being a contestant. Nottet returned as a coach in 2026 for the twelfth season, coaching the winner of the season, Clément Chevalier.

=== 2022–present: Addictocrate ===
On 9 November 2022, he released the song "Mélodrame" on all streaming platforms.

His third studio album, Addictocrate, was released on 26 May 2023. Unlike his first two albums, Addictocrate is in French, Nottet's native language. A year later, on 26 May 2024, Nottet released an acoustic version of the album, Addictocrate*.

On 28 June 2026, Nottet announced that his fourth studio album had been completed. The first single from the album, "libre", was released on 25 September 2026.

== Discography ==
- Selfocracy (2017)
- Sillygomania (2020)
- Addictocrate (2023)

== See also ==
- Edward Bruce (music executive)

Awards and achievements
Preceded by Axel Hirsoux with "Mother"	Belgium in the Eurovision Song Contest; 2015	Succeeded by Laura Tesoro with "What's the Pressure"
