= Drag Race Belgique season 2 =

2024 season of Drag Race Belgique

Drag Race Belgique
- Season 2
- Promotional poster for season two
- Hosted by: Rita Baga
- Judges: Rita Baga; Lio; Mustii
- No. of contestants: 9
- Winner: Alvilda
- Runner-up: La Veuve
- Miss Congeniality: Star
- No. of episodes: 8

Release
- Original network: Tipik and Auvio (Belgium); WOW Presents Plus (International)
- Original release: 1 February – 21 March 2024

Season chronology
- ← Previous; Season 1

The second season of Drag Race Belgique premiered on 1 February 2024 on Tipik and Auvio in Belgium. The season was confirmed by Tipik on 5 May 2023.

== Production ==
On 8 May 2023, casting for season two was announced via the show's official Instagram page. Applications remained open for two weeks, closing on 26 May.

In June 2023, it was announced that Lufy would not return as a judge in the second season, due to a scheduling conflict with another project she was working on. In January 2024, RTBF revealed Portuguese-Belgian singer and actress Lio, who previously appeared as a guest judge during the first season, as the show's new judge.

In January 2024, after releasing a promotional mini trailer, Tipik released a promotional post on social media, showcasing the host, Rita Baga, along with the judges, Lio and Mustii in a botanic garden-themed set.

== Contestants ==
Ages, names, and cities stated are at time of filming.

Contestants of Drag Race Belgique season 2 and their backgrounds
Contestant	Age	Hometown	Outcome
Alvilda	29	City of Brussels, Brussels	Winner
La Veuve	37	City of Brussels, Brussels	Runner-up
Gabanna	27	City of Brussels, Brussels	3rd place
Loulou Velvet	31	City of Brussels, Brussels	3rd place
Chloe Clarke	27	Ghent, Flanders	5th place
Star	43	Antwerp, Flanders	6th place (Note: Star was voted Miss Congeniality.)
Morphæ	23	City of Brussels, Brussels	7th place (Note: Morphæ quit the competition before the lipsync.)
Madame Yoko	33	Luxembourg City, Luxembourg	8th place
Sarah Logan	35	Liège, Wallonia	9th place

== Contestant progress ==
Legend:

Alvilda won Drag Race Belgique season 2.
La Veuve was the runner-up.
Star was voted Miss Congeniality (Miss C).
WIN indicates that the contestant won the challenge.
SAFE indicates that the contestant was declared safe by the judges.
BTM (Bottom) indicates that the contestant was up for elimination.
ELIM (Eliminated) indicates that the contestant was eliminated.
QUIT indicates that Morphæ quit the competition.
Guest indicates that the contestant returned as a guest.

Contestants progress with placements in each episode
Contestant	Episode								
Contestant	1	2	3	4	5	6	7	8	
Alvilda	SAFE	SAFE	WIN	WIN	SAFE	SAFE	BTM	WIN	Winner
La Veuve	WIN	SAFE	BTM	SAFE	SAFE	WIN	WIN	SAFE	Runner-up
Gabanna	BTM	SAFE	SAFE	SAFE	BTM	SAFE	SAFE	SAFE	Eliminated
Loulou Velvet	SAFE	WIN	SAFE	BTM	SAFE	BTM	BTM	SAFE	Eliminated
Chloe Clarke	BTM	BTM	SAFE	SAFE	WIN	ELIM			Guest
Star	SAFE	SAFE	SAFE	SAFE	ELIM				Miss C
Morphæ	SAFE	SAFE	SAFE	QUIT					Guest
Madame Yoko	SAFE	SAFE	ELIM						Guest
Sarah Logan	SAFE	ELIM							Guest

== Lip syncs ==
Legend:

The contestant was eliminated after their first time in the bottom.
The contestant was eliminated after their third time in the bottom.
The contestant won the first round of the Lip Sync Smackdown for the Crown and advanced to the second one.
The contestant won the second round of the Lip Sync Smackdown for the Crown and was declared the winner of the season.

Episode	Contestants			Song	Eliminated
1	Chloe Clarke	vs.	Gabanna	"Rain on Me" (Lady Gaga, Ariana Grande)	None
2	Chloe Clarke	vs.	Sarah Logan	"Mad About You" (Hooverphonic)	Sarah Logan
3	La Veuve	vs.	Madame Yoko	"Bruxelles je t'aime" (Angèle)	Madame Yoko
4	Loulou Velvet (Note: Morphæ quit the competition before the bottom two were revealed. Rita Baga then told Loulou Velvet that Morphæ and her would have been the bottom two and offered Loulou a chance to perform the lip sync solo.)			"Toy" (Netta)	None
5	Gabanna	vs.	Star	"My Head & My Heart" (Ava Max)	Star
6	Chloe Clarke	vs.	Loulou Velvet	"Trustfall" (Pink)	Chloe Clarke
7	Alvilda	vs.	Loulou Velvet	"Mr/Mme" (Loïc Nottet)	None
Episode	Final contestants			Song	Winner
8	Alvilda	vs.	Gabanna	"Physical" (Dua Lipa)	Alvilda
8	La Veuve	vs.	Loulou Velvet	"Warrior" (Oscar and the Wolf)	La Veuve
8	Alvilda	vs.	La Veuve	"Too Young" (Hyphen Hyphen)	Alvilda

== Guest judges ==
Listed in chronological order:

- Paloma, winner of the Drag Race France season 1
- Tatiana Silva, TV host, model and Miss Belgium 2005
- Elvis Pompilio, fashion designer
- Marie Guérin, editor-in-chief of Elle Belgique
- Gaëlle Garcia Diaz, youtuber, model, actress, singer and former TV presenter
- Gustaph, singer and songwriter
- Cécile Djunga, comedian
- Charles, singer
- Coralie Barbier, artistic director of Mosaert
- Loïc Nottet, singer
- Nick Coutsier, dancer and choreographer
- Santa, singer and lead vocalist of Hyphen Hyphen

=== Special guests ===
Guests who appeared in episodes, but did not judge on the main stage.

Episode 1

- Drag Couenne, winner of Drag Race Belgique season 1
- Athena Sorgelikis, runner-up of Drag Race Belgique season 1
- Susan, contestant on Drag Race Belgique season 1
- Mademoiselle Boop, contestant on Drag Race Belgique season 1
- Peach, contestant on Drag Race Belgique season 1
- Valenciaga, Miss Congeniality of Drag Race Belgique season 1
- Mocca Bone, contestant on Drag Race Belgique season 1
- Edna Sorgelsen, contestant on Drag Race Belgique season 1
- Amanda Tears, contestant on Drag Race Belgique season 1
- Brittany Von Bottoks, contestant on Drag Race Belgique season 1

Episode 3

- LaDiva Live, drag queen and singer

Episode 8

- Jimbo, contestant on Canada's Drag Race season 1, RuPaul's Drag Race: UK vs. the World series 1, and winner of RuPaul's Drag Race All Stars season 8
- Drag Couenne, winner of Drag Race Belgique season 1

== Episodes ==
No. overall	No. in season	Title	Original release date
9	1	"De retour!"	1 February 2024
Nine new queens enter the workroom. For the first mini-challenge, the queens do a photoshoot while riding a mechanical unicorn. Alvilda wins the mini-challenge. For the main challenge, the queens perform a talent show in front of the judges.: Alvilda – Original song/fire dancing; Chloe Clarke – Dancing; Gabanna – Live singing; La Veuve – Stand-Up; Loulou Velvet – Burlesque; Madame Yoko – Live singing; Morphæ – Piano playing; Sarah Logan – Lip-syncing/burlesque; Star – Slapstick burlesque; On the runway, category is Drache Nationale (National Downpour). Alvilda and La Veuve receive positive critiques, with La Veuve winning the challenge. Chloe Clarke, Gabanna and Morphæ receive negative critiques, with Morphæ being safe. Chloe Clarke and Gabanna lip-sync to "Rain on Me" by Lady Gaga and Ariana Grande. Both queens win the lip-sync and no one goes home.: Guest Judges: Paloma and Tatiana Silva; Mini-Challenge: Photoshoot while riding a mechanical unicorn; Mini-Challenge Winner: Alvilda; Main Challenge: Perform a talent show in front of the judges; Runway Theme: Drache Nationale (National Downpour); Challenge Winner: La Veuve; Challenge Prize: A €1,000 cash tip; Bottom Two: Chloe Clarke and Gabanna; Lip-Sync Song: "Rain on Me" by Lady Gaga and Ariana Grande; Eliminated: None
10	2	"Drag-en-Ciel"	8 February 2024
For this week's mini-challenge, the queens audition for a Jean-Claude Van Damme martial arts film. Madame Yoko wins the mini-challenge. For the main challenge, the queens create a monochromatic look made from unconventional materials based on the colors of the rainbow.: Alvilda - Orange; Chloe Clarke - Red; Gabanna - Yellow; La Veuve - Purple; Loulou Velvet - White; Morphæ - Black; Madame Yoko - Blue; Sarah Logan - Green; Star - Pink; On the runway, category is Drag-en-Ciel (Drag Rainbow). Alvilda, Loulou Velvet and Madame Yoko receive positive critiques, with Loulou Velvet winning the challenge. Chloe Clarke, La Veuve and Sarah Logan receive negative critiques, with La Veuve being safe. Chloe Clarke and Sarah Logan lip-sync to "Mad About You" by Hooverphonic. Chloe Clarke wins the lip-sync and Sarah Logan is the first queen to sashay away.: Guest Judges: Elvis Pompilio and Marie Guérin; Mini-Challenge: Audition for a Jean-Claude Van Damme martial arts film; Mini-Challenge Winner: Madame Yoko; Main Challenge: Create a monochromatic look made from unconventional materials based on the colors of the rainbow; Runway Theme: Drag-en-Ciel (Drag Rainbow); Challenge Winner: Loulou Velvet; Challenge Prize: A €1,000 cash tip and a jewelry set from Aster LAB; Bottom Two: Chloe Clarke and Sarah Logan; Lip-Sync Song: "Mad About You" by Hooverphonic; Eliminated: Sarah Logan; Farewell Message: "Ce fut court mais intense. Je vous emporte dans mon cœur, dans mon drag. Battez vous. Love. Sarah Logan ♡" ("It was short but intense. I carry you in my heart, in my drag. Fight on. Love. Sarah Logan ♡")
11	3	"Jawadde Dadde"	15 February 2024
For this week's main challenge, the queens write, record, and perform verses to "Attitude" and "Be Yourself".: Identitties - Alvilda, Gabanna, La Veuve, and Morphæ performing "Be Yourself"; SLYC - Chloe Clarke, Loulou Velvet, Madame Yoko and Star performing "Attitude"; On the runway, category is Art Nouveau. Alvilda and Chloe Clarke receive positive critiques, with Alvilda winning the challenge. La Veuve, Madame Yoko and Star receive negative critiques, with Star being safe. La Veuve and Madame Yoko lip-sync to "Bruxelles je t'aime" by Angèle. La Veuve wins the lip-sync and Madame Yoko sashays away.: Guest Judge: Gaëlle Garcia Diaz; Main Challenge: Write, record, and perform verses to "Attitude" and "Be Yourself"; Runway Theme: Art Nouveau; Challenge Winner: Alvilda; Challenge Prize: A €1,000 cash tip; Bottom Two: La Veuve and Madame Yoko; Lip-Sync Song: "Bruxelles je t'aime" by Angèle; Eliminated: Madame Yoko; Farewell Message: "Les filles, soyez démentes. On se revoit bientôt. Votre Yoko ♡♡♡" ("Girls, be crazy, See you soon. Yours Yoko ♡♡♡")
12	4	"Masquerade"	22 February 2024
For this week's mini challenge, the queens compete in the Bootylicious Cha Cha Cha Dance-Off. Star wins the mini-challenge. For the main challenge, the queens write and deliver a one minute proposal for a new drag law. On the runway, category is Mille et une Belgique à l'Eurovision (1001 Belgiums at Eurovision). Gabanna and Star are reprimanded by the judges for looking at judges' notes and warned that further cheating would result in their disqualification. Alvilda and Gabanna receive positive critiques, with Alvilda winning the challenge. Chloe Clarke, Loulou Velvet and Morphæ receive negative critiques, with Chloe Clarke being safe. Before the lip-sync Morphæ decides to leave the competition. Loulou Velvet is asked to lip-sync alone to "Toy" by Netta, with no further elimination.: Guest Judge: Gustaph; Mini-Challenge: Compete in the Bootylicious Cha Cha Cha Dance-Off; Mini-Challenge Winner: Star; Main Challenge: Write and deliver a one minute proposal for a new drag law; Runway Theme: Mille et une Belgique à l'Eurovision (1001 Belgiums at Eurovision); Challenge Winner: Alvilda; Challenge Prize: A €1,000 cash tip; Bottom Two: Loulou Velvet and Morphæ; Lip-Sync Song: "Toy" by Netta; Quit: Morphæ; Farewell Message: "Déployez vos ailes. Je vous aimes. MORPHÆ 🦋" ("Spread your wings. I love you. MORPHÆ 🦋")
13	5	"Snatch Game"	29 February 2024
For this week's mini-challenge, the queens have a bitchfest with puppets. La Veuve wins the mini-challenge. For the main challenge, the queens play the Snatch Game. Cécile Djunga and Charles star as the celebrity contestants. The cast consisted of: Alvilda as Anne Dorval (as Criquette Rockwell from Le cœur a ses raisons) and a homophobic protester; Chloe Clarke as Gollum a (a parodic cousin of Gollum); Gabanna as Frida Kahlo; La Veuve as Joan of Arc; Loulou Velvet as Yolande Moreau; Star as Little Red Riding Hood; On the runway, category is En Rolleurs, Baby! (Get Your Skates On, Baby!). Alvilda and Chloe Clarke receive positive critiques, with Chloe Clarke winning the challenge. Gabanna and Star receive negative critiques, and are announced as the bottom two. They lip-sync to "My Head & My Heart" by Ava Max. Gabanna wins the lip-sync and Star sashays away.: Guest Judges: Cécile Djunga and Charles; Mini-Challenge: Everybody Loves Puppets; Mini-Challenge Winner: La Veuve; Main Challenge: Snatch Game; Runway Theme: En Rolleurs, Baby! (Get Your Skates On, Baby!); Challenge Winner: Chloe Clarke; Challenge Prize: A €1,000 cash tip; Bottom Two: Gabanna and Star; Lip-Sync Song: "My Head & My Heart" by Ava Max; Eliminated: Star; Farewell Message: "Mes enfants, slay another day, enshantay. XXX Star 💋 ☆" ("My children, slay another day, enshantay" XXX Star 💋 ☆")
14	6	"Le Crime du Drag Express"	7 March 2024
For this week's mini-challenge, the queens read each other to filth. La Veuve wins the mini-challenge. For the main challenge, the queens act in a parody of Murder on the Orient Express called "Le Crime du Drag Express".: Alvilda as The Countess; Chloe Clarke as Henrietta; Gabanna as The Duchess; La Veuve as Herculea Poirot; Loulou Velvet as The Conductor; On the runway, category is Tenues Saxy (Saxy Outfits). Alvilda and La Veuve receive positive critiques, with La Veuve winning the challenge. Chloe Clarke and Loulou Velvet receive negative critiques, and are announced as the bottom two. They lip-sync to "Trustfall" by Pink. Loulou Velvet wins the lip-sync and Chloe Clarke sashays away.: Guest Judge: Coralie Barbier; Mini-Challenge: Reading is Fundamental; Mini-Challenge Winner: La Veuve; Main Challenge: Act in a parody of Murder on the Orient Express called "Le Crime du Drag Express"; Runway Theme: Tenues Saxy (Saxy Outfits); Challenge Winner: La Veuve; Challenge Prize: A €1,000 cash tip; Bottom Two: Chloe Clarke and Loulou Velvet; Lip-Sync Song: "Trustfall" by Pink; Eliminated: Chloe Clarke; Farewell Message: "Bon, les soeurs je vais fumer ♡ Loulou salle put xx ♡" ("Okay, sister I'm going to smoke ♡ Loulou dirty whore xx ♡")
15	7	"Paquets cadeaux"	14 March 2024
For this week's main challenge, the queens makeover a loved one On the runway, category is Une Histoire de Famille (Family Portrait). La Veuve wins the challenge. Alvilda and Loulou Velvet receive negative critiques, and are announced as the bottom two. They lip-sync to "Mr/Mme" by Loïc Nottet. Both queens win the lip-sync and no one goes home.: Guest Judge: Loïc Nottet; Main Challenge: Makeover a loved one; Runway Theme: Une Histoire de Famille (Family Portrait); Challenge Winner: La Veuve; Challenge Prize: A €1,000 cash tip; Bottom Two: Alvilda and Loulou Velvet; Lip-Sync Song: "Mr/Mme" by Loïc Nottet; Eliminated: None
16	8	"Grand Finale"	21 March 2024
For the final challenge of the season, the queens write, record and perform their own verses to Mustii and Delta's song "L'union fait la force". On the runway, category is Drag Excellence. The eliminated queens all return to the runway, where it is announced that Star is this season's Miss Congeniality. Alvilda is announced as the winner of the challenge. Rita Baga then announces that the final four queens will take part in a Lip-Sync Smackdown for the Crown. The first lip-sync is between Alvilda and Gabanna. They lip-sync to "Physical" by Dua Lipa. Alvilda wins the lip-sync and Gabanna is eliminated. The second lip-sync is between La Veuve and Loulou Velvet. They lip-sync to "Warrior" by Oscar and the Wolf. La Veuve wins the lip-sync and Loulou Velvet is eliminated. The final lip-sync is between Alvilda and La Veuve. They lip-sync to "Too Young" by Hyphen Hyphen. It is announced that Alvilda is the winner, leaving La Veuve as the runner-up.: Guest Judges: Nick Coutsier and Santa; Main Challenge: Write, record and perform their own verses to Mustii and Delta's song "L'union fait la force"; Runway Theme: Drag Excellence; Miss Congeniality: Star; Challenge Winner: Alvilda; Final Four: Alvilda, Gabanna, La Veuve and Loulou Velvet; Lip-Sync Smackdown #1: Alvilda vs. Gabanna; Lip-Sync Song: "Physical" by Dua Lipa; Eliminated: Gabanna; Lip-Sync Smackdown #2: La Veuve vs. Loulou Velvet; Lip-Sync Song: "Warrior" by Oscar and the Wolf; Eliminated: Loulou Velvet; Lip-Sync Smackdown #3: Alvilda vs. La Veuve; Lip-Sync Song: "Too Young" by Hyphen Hyphen; Runner-up: La Veuve; Winner of Drag Race Belgique Season Two: Alvilda
