= Belgium in the Eurovision Song Contest 2025 =

- Eurovision Song Contest 2025
- Participating broadcaster: Vlaamse Radio- en Televisieomroeporganisatie (VRT)
- Country: Belgium
- Selection process: Eurosong 2025
- Selection date: 1 February 2025

Competing entry
- Song: "Strobe Lights"
- Artist: Red Sebastian
- Songwriters: Astrid Roelants; Billie Bentein; Seppe Herreman; Willem Vanderstichele

Placement
- Semi-final result: Failed to qualify (14th)

Participation chronology

Belgium was represented at the Eurovision Song Contest 2025 with the song "Strobe Lights", written by Astrid Roelants, Billie Bentein, Seppe Herreman, and Willem Vanderstichele, and performed by Herreman himself under his stage name Red Sebastian. The Belgian participating broadcaster, Flemish Vlaamse Radio- en Televisieomroeporganisatie (VRT), organised the national final Eurosong 2025 in order to select its entry for the contest.

Belgium was drawn to compete in the first semi-final, which took place on 13 May 2025. Performing during the show in position 9, Belgium was not announced among the top 10 entries of the first semi-final and therefore failed to qualify to compete in the final on 17 May. It was later revealed that Belgium placed 14th out of the 15 participating countries in the semi-final with 23 points.

== Background ==
Prior to the 2025 contest, Belgium had participated in the Eurovision Song Contest sixty-five times since its debut as one of seven countries to take part in 1956, only missing the 1994, 1997, and 2001 editions. Since then, the country has won the contest on one occasion in 1986 with the song "J'aime la vie", performed by Sandra Kim. Following the introduction of semi-finals for 2004, Belgium had featured in nine finals. In 2024, "Before the Party's Over" by Mustii failed to qualify for the final.

The Belgian participation in the contest alternates between two broadcasters: Flemish Vlaamse Radio- en Televisieomroeporganisatie (VRT) and French-speaking Radio-télévision belge de la Communauté française (RTBF), with both broadcasters sharing broadcasting rights. Both broadcasters and their predecessors had selected the Belgian entries using national finals and internal selections in the past. In 2023, VRT organised the national final Eurosong in order to select the Belgian entry, while in 2024, RTBF opted for an internal selection. On 8 May 2024, VRT confirmed its participation in the 2025 contest and announced that it would select its entry through the national final Eurosong 2025.

== Before Eurovision ==
=== Eurosong 2025 ===
Eurosong 2025 was the national final developed by VRT to select its entry for the Eurovision Song Contest 2025. The competition consisted of two pre-recorded showcase shows on 18 and 25 January 2025, followed by a live final on 1 February 2025. All three shows were hosted by Peter Van de Veire and broadcast on VRT 1, as well as on the broadcaster's online streaming platform VRT Max and internationally via the Eurovision Song Contest's official YouTube channel.

==== Format ====
Eight artists were sought to compete in Eurosong. The competition included two non-competitive showcase shows that were broadcast on 18 and 25 January 2025. Each shows featured four of the eight artists presenting their candidate Eurovision song without any staging and a cover version of a past Eurovision Song Contest song. The final took place on 1 February 2025, where the winner was chosen by an expert jury and public televoting.

The jury panel consisted of:

- Gustaph – singer and vocal coach, represented Belgium in 2023
- Bart Cannaerts – television presenter and comedian
- Merol – Dutch singer and actress
- Emmelie de Forest – Danish singer-songwriter, winner of the 2013 contest
- André Vermeulen – journalist and Eurovision specialist
- Els Germonpré – music coordinator for VRT 1
- Leslie Cable – Eurovision Head of Delegation for Wallonian broadcaster RTBF
- Stephan Monsieur – chairman of OGAE Belgium
- Jasper van Biesen – author of 65 Years of Belgium at the Eurovision Song Contest
- Indy van Cauwenbergh – choreographer
- Kim Debrie – presenter at Radio 2
- Anja Daems – presenter at Radio 2
- Laura Govaerts – presenter at MNM
- Imane Boudadi – director and presenter at MNM
- Nona Van Braeckel – digital creative at Studio Brussel

==== Competing entries ====
An application period for record labels, artist managers and producers to propose artists was opened in May 2024, and an A&R Team (Arts and Repertoire) consisting of music and media experts from VRT, which among its members included editor-in-chief Cliff Vrancken and general music coordinator Gerrit Kerremans, shortlisted several artists to submit two songs by September 2024. A jury panel consisting of radio, television and music experts selected eight artists for the competition following several auditions rounds at the Reyerstoren in Brussels, with their candidate Eurovision songs being selected together with VRT. The names of the eight acts were announced on 11 November 2024. The candidate Eurovision songs to be performed by the artists were announced on 13 January 2025, along with 18-second snippets of each entry.

Artist	Song	Language	Songwriter(s)
Grace	"Pull Up"	English, Lingala	Ameerah A. Roelants; Grace Khuabi; Willem Vanderstichele
Jelle van Dael	"Monster"	English	Jelle van Dael; Lindi Konings; Udo Mechels; Willem Vanderstichele
Le Manou	"Fille à papa"	French	Manou Maerten; Willem Vanderstichele
Leez	"Perfectly Imperfect"	English	Lisa van Rossem; Loek van der Grinten; Philipine Nancy Corporaal; Will Knox
Lenn	"Air Balloon"	English	Len Neefs; Willem Vanderstichele
Mentissa	"Désolée"	French	Lili Louise Musique/La Passée Editions; Mentissa Mpatha Ngandu; Vianney Bureau
Red Sebastian	"Strobe Lights"	English	Ameerah A. Roelants; Billie Bentein; Seppe Herreman; Willem Vanderstichele
Stefanie Callebaut	"Gloria"	English	Jeroen Swinnen; Stefanie Callebaut

==== Showcases ====
The two showcase shows were filmed on 10 and 14 December 2024 at the VRT Studio 5 in Brussels and aired on 18 and 25 January 2025. In each show, four competing artists performed their candidate song for Eurovision without any staging and a cover version of a past Eurovision song.

Show 1 – 18 January 2025
R/O	Artist	Song	Cover (Original artist)
1	Grace	"Pull Up"	"Voilà" (Barbara Pravi)
2	Leez	"Perfectly Imperfect"	"Heroes" (Måns Zelmerlöw)
3	Le Manou	"Fille à papa"	"J'aime la vie" (Sandra Kim)
4	Lenn	"Air Balloon"	"Ik heb zorgen" / "Jennifer Jennings" (Louis Neefs)

Show 2 – 25 January 2025
R/O	Artist	Song	Cover (Original artist)
1	Jelle van Dael	"Monster"	"City Lights" (Blanche)
2	Mentissa	"Désolée"	"Rise Like a Phoenix" (Conchita Wurst)
3	Stefanie Callebaut	"Gloria"	"Tattoo" (Loreen)
4	Red Sebastian	"Strobe Lights"	"Arcade" (Duncan Laurence)

==== Final ====
The final took place on 1 February 2025 at the EMG Studio 7 in Vilvoorde. Each artist performed their candidate Eurovision song and the winner, "Strobe Lights" performed by Red Sebastian, was selected by the combination of results from an expert jury and a public televote. The public and the jury each had a total of 585 points to award. Each member of the jury awarded points from 1-7, 8 and 10, while the televote awarded points based on the percentage of votes each song achieved. For example, if a song gained 10% of the viewer vote, then that entry would be awarded 10% of 585 points rounded to the nearest integer: 59 points. Four of the jury members also provided commentary and feedback on the songs during the show: Gustaph, Bart Cannaerts, Merol, and Emmelie de Forest.

In addition to the competing entries, the show was opened by jury member Gustaph who performed his 2023 entry "Because of You". Interval acts were Tom Dice performing his 2010 entry "Me and My Guitar", and jury member Emmelie de Forest performing her 2013 winning song "Only Teardrops".

Final – 1 February 2025
R/O	Artist	Song	Jury	Televote	Total	Place
1	Leez	"Perfectly Imperfect"	72	72	144	2
2	Le Manou	"Fille à papa"	54	21	75	8
3	Jelle van Dael	"Monster"	68	47	115	4
4	Mentissa	"Désolée"	73	58	131	3
5	Lenn	"Air Balloon"	55	27	82	7
6	Stefanie Callebaut	"Gloria"	70	41	111	5
7	Red Sebastian	"Strobe Lights"	132	291	423	1
8	Grace	"Pull Up"	61	28	89	6

==== Ratings ====
Viewing figures by show
Show	Date	Viewers	Ref.
Showcase show 1	18 January 2025	528,705	
Showcase show 2	25 January 2025	417,628	
Final	1 February 2025	683,547	

== At Eurovision ==
Red Sebastian competed for Belgium at the Eurovision Song Contest 2025 at the St. Jakobshalle in Basel, Switzerland. He competed in the First Semi-Final on the May 13th, competing 9th in the running order. Despite Red Sebastian having an 88% chance of qualification and being 5th in the overall odds to win Eurovision, he finished 14th with 23 points, meaning that he failed to qualify for the Grand Final.

Belgium received 23 points in total during Semi-Final 1, tied in points with Slovenia. However, due to Slovenia receiving points from more countries than Belgium, they finished ahead of Belgium.

=== Points awarded to Belgium ===
Points awarded to Belgium (Semi-final 1)
Score	Televote
12 points	San Marino (Note: San Marino uses a jury in the semi-finals.)
10 points	
8 points	
7 points	
6 points	
5 points	Iceland; Netherlands
4 points	
3 points	
2 points	
1 point	Estonia

=== Points awarded by Belgium ===
Points awarded by Belgium (Semi-final 1)
Score	Televote
12 points	Netherlands
10 points	Poland
8 points	Sweden
7 points	Albania
6 points	Ukraine
5 points	Iceland
4 points	Estonia
3 points	Portugal
2 points	Norway
1 point	San Marino

Points awarded by Belgium (Final)
Score	Televote	Jury
12 points	Israel	Austria
10 points	Poland	Estonia
8 points	France	Switzerland
7 points	Albania	Latvia
6 points	Greece	Sweden
5 points	Netherlands	Italy
4 points	Sweden	Finland
3 points	Austria	Netherlands
2 points	Estonia	Poland
1 point	Italy	Germany

=== Detailed voting results ===
Each participating broadcaster assembles a five-member jury panel consisting of music industry professionals who are citizens of the country they represent. Each jury, and individual jury member, is required to meet a strict set of criteria regarding professional background, as well as diversity in gender and age. No member of a national jury was permitted to be related in any way to any of the competing acts in such a way that they cannot vote impartially and independently. The individual rankings of each jury member as well as the nation's televoting results were released shortly after the grand final.

The following members comprised the Belgian jury:

- Hans Francken
- Indy Van Cauwenberg
- Xavier Taveirne
- Billie Leyers
- Noémie Wolfs

Detailed voting results from Belgium (Semi-final 1)
R/O	Country	Televote	
R/O	Country	Rank	Points
01	Iceland	6	5
02	Poland	2	10
03	Slovenia	12	
04	Estonia	7	4
05	Ukraine	5	6
06	Sweden	3	8
07	Portugal	8	3
08	Norway	9	2
09	Belgium		
10	Azerbaijan	14	
11	San Marino	10	1
12	Albania	4	7
13	Netherlands	1	12
14	Croatia	13	
15	Cyprus	11	

Detailed voting results from Belgium (Final)
R/O	Country	Jury							Televote	
R/O	Country	Juror A	Juror B	Juror C	Juror D	Juror E	Rank	Points	Rank	Points
01	Norway	17	21	16	14	17	18		21	
02	Luxembourg	26	25	13	20	18	22		13	
03	Estonia	4	7	3	4	3	2	10	9	2
04	Israel	21	26	12	24	8	15		1	12
05	Lithuania	9	11	20	11	15	12		16	
06	Spain	18	18	14	22	22	21		14	
07	Ukraine	8	15	23	12	12	13		11	
08	United Kingdom	22	14	22	23	10	17		26	
09	Austria	5	1	4	1	1	1	12	8	3
10	Iceland	16	17	24	21	25	24		17	
11	Latvia	10	3	11	2	2	4	7	19	
12	Netherlands	3	6	7	7	9	8	3	6	5
13	Finland	2	4	5	18	11	7	4	12	
14	Italy	13	10	2	6	4	6	5	10	1
15	Poland	14	12	6	8	6	9	2	2	10
16	Germany	6	9	10	17	7	10	1	15	
17	Greece	23	13	15	10	26	16		5	6
18	Armenia	20	22	19	15	19	23		18	
19	Switzerland	12	5	1	3	5	3	8	23	
20	Malta	25	16	17	13	23	19		25	
21	Portugal	24	23	25	25	20	26		20	
22	Denmark	7	8	9	9	16	11		22	
23	Sweden	1	2	18	5	14	5	6	7	4
24	France	11	19	8	16	21	14		3	8
25	San Marino	15	24	26	26	24	25		24	
26	Albania	19	20	21	19	13	20		4	7
