= Drag Race Belgique season 1 =

2023 season of Drag Race Belgique

Drag Race Belgique
- Season 1
- Promotional poster for season one
- Hosted by: Rita Baga
- Judges: Rita Baga; Lufy; Mustii
- No. of contestants: 10
- Winner: Drag Couenne
- Runner-up: Athena Sorgelikis
- Miss Congeniality: Valenciaga
- No. of episodes: 8

Release
- Original network: Tipik and Auvio (Belgium); WOW Presents Plus (International)
- Original release: 16 February – 6 April 2023

Season chronology
- Next → Season 2

The first season of Drag Race Belgique premiered on 16 February 2023. The season aired on Tipik and Auvio in Belgium and WOW Presents Plus internationally. The season was confirmed by World of Wonder on 29 April 2022.

The winner of the first season of Drag Race Belgique was Drag Couenne, with Athena Sorgelikis as the runner-up. Valenciaga was named Miss Congeniality.

== Production ==
World of Wonder, the production company behind RuPaul's Drag Race, announced that a Belgian adaptation of the show, specifically from the French-speaking area of Wallonia, was in the works on 29 April 2022. On the same day, it was announced via the shows official Instagram page, that casting for the first season was now open. Applications remained open for one week until closing on 8 May 2022. The series marks the second French-language adaptation of the American show, after Drag Race France.

French Canadian drag queen Rita Baga, who was a runner-up on the first season of Canada's Drag Race and finalist on the first season of Canada vs. the World, was confirmed as a host and head judge in July 2022. The other two judges, Lufy and Mustii, were confirmed on 7 January during RuPaul's DragCon UK.

Ten contestants were announced on 25 January 2023.

== Contestants ==
Ages, names, and cities stated are at time of filming.

Contestants of Drag Race Belgique season 1 and their backgrounds
Contestant	Age	Hometown	Outcome
Drag Couenne	24	City of Brussels, Brussels	Winner
Athena Sorgelikis (Note: Athena Likis is referred to as Athena Sorgelikis on the show.)	27	City of Brussels, Brussels	Runner-up
Susan (Note: Susan from Grindr is referred to as Susan on the show.)	26	Ghent, Flanders	3rd place
Mademoiselle Boop	37	City of Brussels, Brussels	4th place
Peach (Note: Peach Rich is referred to as Peach on the show.)	23	Liège, Wallonia	5th place
Valenciaga	26	Ghent, Flanders	6th place (Note: Valenciaga was voted Miss Congeniality after the finale aired.)
Mocca Bone	35	City of Brussels, Brussels	7th place
Edna Sorgelsen	34	Liège, Wallonia	8th place
Amanda Tears	21	Mouscron, Wallonia	9th place
Brittany Von Bottoks	36	Mons, Wallonia	10th place

=== Future Drag Race appearances ===
- In 2024 Athena Sorgelikis competed on RuPaul's Drag Race Global All Stars.

== Contestant progress ==
Legend:

Drag Couenne won Drag Race Belgique season 1.
Athena Sorgelikis was the runner-up.
Valenciaga was voted Miss Congeniality (Miss C) after the show aired.
WIN indicates that the contestant won the challenge.
SAFE indicates that the contestant was declared safe by the judges.
BTM (Bottom) indicates that the contestant was up for elimination.
ELIM (Eliminated) indicates that the contestant was eliminated.
Guest indicates that the contestant returned as a guest.

Contestants progress with placements in each episode
Contestant	Episode							
Contestant	1	2	3	4	5	6	7	8
Drag Couenne	SAFE	WIN	SAFE	WIN	SAFE	SAFE	WIN	Winner
Athena Sorgelikis	WIN	SAFE	SAFE	SAFE	SAFE	WIN	BTM	Runner-up
Susan	SAFE	SAFE	WIN	BTM	SAFE	SAFE	SAFE	Eliminated
Mademoiselle Boop	SAFE	SAFE	SAFE	SAFE	WIN	BTM	ELIM	Guest
Peach	SAFE	SAFE	SAFE	SAFE	BTM	ELIM		Guest
Valenciaga	SAFE	BTM	BTM	SAFE	ELIM			Miss C
Mocca Bone	SAFE	SAFE	BTM	ELIM				Guest
Edna Sorgelsen	SAFE	SAFE	ELIM					Guest
Amanda Tears	BTM	ELIM						Guest
Brittany Von Bottoks	ELIM							Guest

== Lip syncs ==
Legend:

The contestant was eliminated after their first time in the bottom.
The contestant was eliminated after their second time in the bottom.
The contestant was eliminated after their third time in the bottom.
The contestant won the Lip Sync for the Crown and was declared the winner of the season.

Episode	Contestants			Song	Eliminated
1	Amanda Tears	vs.	Brittany Von Bottoks	"Tous les mêmes" (Stromae)	Brittany Von Bottoks
2	Amanda Tears	vs.	Valenciaga	"Je t'aime" (Lara Fabian)	Amanda Tears
3	Edna Sorgelsen vs. Mocca Bone vs. Valenciaga			"Pump Up the Jam" (Technotronic)	Edna Sorgelsen
4	Mocca Bone	vs.	Susan	"Million Eyes" (Loïc Nottet)	Mocca Bone
5	Peach	vs.	Valenciaga	"The Feeling" (Gabry Ponte, Henri PFR)	Valenciaga
6	Mademoiselle Boop	vs.	Peach	"J'aime la vie" (Sandra Kim)	Peach
7	Athena Sorgelikis	vs.	Mademoiselle Boop	"Le Banana Split" (Lio)	Mademoiselle Boop
Episode	Final contestants			Song	Winner
8	Athena Sorgelikis	vs.	Drag Couenne	"Démons" (Angèle ft. Damso)	Drag Couenne

== Guest judges ==
Listed in chronological order:

- Fanny Ruwet, comedian
- Rokia Bamba, DJ
- BJ Scott, singer
- Jarry, actor and comedian
- Jean-Paul Lespagnard, fashion designer
- Anne Gruwez, examining magistrate and television personality
- Plastic Bertrand, musician, producer, and television presenter
- David Jeanmotte, television columnist
- Sandra Kim, singer and winner of the Eurovision Song Contest 1986
- Lio, singer and actress
- Elena Gambardella, choreographer
- Vanessa Van Cartier, winner of the second season of Drag Race Holland

=== Special guests ===
Guests who appeared in episodes, but did not judge on the main stage.

Episode 5

- Juriji Der Klee, contestant on the second season of Drag Race España

Episode 6

- David Wathelet, journalist and television presenter
- Lara Bellerose, musician, television and radio presenter
- Oliver Fraipoint, journalist and television personality
- Stéphane Piedboeuf, television and radio presenter
- Tamara Payne, impersonator and television personality

Episode 8

- Laura Crowet and Eric Renwart, music duo and record producers

== Episodes ==
No. overall	No. in season	Title	Original release date
1	1	"Bonjour Iedereen"	16 February 2023
Ten queens enter the workroom. For the first main challenge, the queens perform a talent show in front of the judges.: Amanda Tears – Striptease; Athena Sorgelikis – Comedy; Brittany Von Bottoks – Stand-Up; Drag Couenne – Live Singing; Edna Sorgelsen – Live Singing and Lip-sync; Mademoiselle Boop – Comedy; Mocca Bone – Dancing en-pointe; Peach – Sword Balancing; Susan – Rhythmic Gymnastics; Valenciaga – Comedy; On the runway, category is Belgicolor: Noir, Jaune, Rouge (Belgicolor: Black, Yellow and Red). Athena Sorgelikis and Drag Couenne receive positive critiques, with Athena Sorgelikis winning the challenge. Amanda Tears, Brittany Von Bottoks and Mocca Bone receive negative critiques, with Mocca Bone being safe. Amanda Tears and Brittany Von Bottoks lip-sync to "Tous les Mêmes" by Stromae. Amanda Tears wins the lip-sync and Brittany Von Bottoks is the first queen to sashay away.: Guest Judge: Fanny Ruwet and Rokia Bamba; Main Challenge: Perform a talent show in front of the judges; Runway Theme: Belgicolor: Noir, Jaune, Rouge (Belgicolor: Black, Yellow and Red); Challenge Winner: Athena Sorgelikis; Challenge Prize: Two tickets to see Stromae in Brussels; Bottom Two: Amanda Tears and Brittany Von Bottoks; Lip-Sync Song: "Tous les Mêmes" by Stromae; Eliminated: Brittany Von Bottoks; Farewell Message: "Vous avez l'air belle, vous avez l'air fortes, vous avez l'Herpes! Randez fier notre pays! Gros bisous, Bottoks" ("You've got beauty, you've got strength, you've got herpes! Make our country proud! Big kisses, Bottoks")
2	2	"Les incontournables"	23 February 2023
For this week's mini-challenge, the queens give face while the pit crew blows them with a leaf blower. Susan wins the mini-challenge. For the main challenge, the queens team up and create a commercial promoting different Belgian foods.: Chicory – Edna Sorgelsen, Peach and Susan; Fries – Athena Sorgelikis, Drag Couenne and Valenciaga; Waffles – Amanda Tears, Mademoiselle Boop and Mocca Bone; On the runway, category is Belgian Comics. Drag Couenne and Peach receive positive critiques, with Drag Couenne winning the challenge. Amanda Tears, Susan and Valenciaga receive negative critiques, with Susan being safe. Amanda Tears and Valenciaga lip-sync to "Je t'aime" by Lara Fabian. Valenciaga wins the lip-sync and Amanda Tears sashays away.: Guest Judges: BJ Scott and Jarry; Mini-Challenge: Give face while the pit crew blows them with a leaf blower; Mini-Challenge Winner: Susan; Main Challenge: In teams, create a commercial promoting different Belgian foods; Runway Theme: Belgian Comics; Challenge Winner: Drag Couenne; Challenge Prize: A trip for two to Thermae Boetfort; Bottom Two: Amanda Tears and Valenciaga; Lip-Sync Song: "Je t'aime" by Lara Fabian; Eliminated: Amanda Tears; Farewell Message: "I'm in tears... Bisous les filles. Amanda" ("I'm in tears... Kisses girls. Amanda")
3	3	"Festival Realness"	2 March 2023
For this week's mini-challenge, the queens do a soccer goalie photoshoot. Edna Sorgelsen wins the mini-challenge. For the main challenge, the queens create two looks made out of festival materials: Les reines de la scène (Queens of the Stage) and Festival Realness. On the runway, Mademoiselle Boop and Susan receive positive critiques, with Susan winning the challenge. Edna Sorgelsen, Mocca Bone and Valenciaga receive negative critiques, and are announced as the bottom three. They lip-sync to "Pump Up the Jam" by Technotronic. Mocca Bone and Valenciaga win the lip-sync and Edna Sorgelsen sashays away.: Guest Judge: Jean-Paul Lespagnard; Mini-Challenge: Soccer goalie photoshoot; Mini-Challenge Winner: Edna Sorgelsen; Main Challenge: Create two looks made out of festival materials; Runway Themes: Les reines de la scène (Queens of the Stage) and Festival Realness; Challenge Winner: Susan; Challenge Prize: Four passes of five days for the Dour festival; Bottom Three: Edna Sorgelsen, Mocca Bone and Valenciaga; Lip-Sync Song: "Pump Up the Jam" by Technotronic; Eliminated: Edna Sorgelsen; Farewell Message: "Les filles, continuez à faire briller le drag belge! xoxo Edna PS: Boop & Athéna ➡ Ramenez le titre à la maison :)" ("Girls, continue to make Belgian drag shine! xoxo Edna PS: Boop & Athéna ➡ Bring the title home :)")
4	4	"L'émission qui vous déshabille"	9 March 2023
For this week's mini-challenge, the queens read each other to filth. Mademoiselle Boop wins the mini-challenge. For the main challenge, the queens act in a parody of Ni juge, ni soumise ("So Help Me God"). On the runway, category is Surréalisme (Surrealism). Drag Couenne and Peach receive positive critiques, with Drag Couenne winning the challenge. Mocca Bone, Susan and Valenciaga receive negative critiques, with Valenciaga being safe. Mocca Bone and Susan lip-sync to "Million Eyes" by Loïc Nottet. Susan wins the lip-sync and Mocca Bone sashays away.: Guest Judge: Anne Gruwez; Mini-Challenge: Reading is Fundamental; Mini-Challenge Winner: Mademoiselle Boop; Main Challenge: Act in a parody of Ni juge, ni soumise ("So Help Me God"); Runway Theme: Surréalisme (Surrealism); Challenge Winner: Drag Couenne; Challenge Prize: VIP stay for six people, two days, at a Pairi Daiza Native House; Bottom Two: Mocca Bone and Susan; Lip-Sync Song: "Million Eyes" by Loïc Nottet; Eliminated: Mocca Bone; Farewell Message: "Restez vous-mêmes. Ne changez pour personne. Je vous aime. Mocca Bonè 💋" ("Stay as you are. Don't change for anyone. I love you. Mocca Bonè 💋")
5	5	"Snatch Game - Belgique Season 1"	16 March 2023
For this week's mini-challenge, the queens lip-sync to RuPaul's "Bring Back My Girls" in pairs. Mademoiselle Boop and Susan win the mini-challenge. For the main challenge, the queens play the Snatch Game. Juriji Der Klee and Plastic Bertrand star as the celebrity contestants. The cast consisted of: Athena Sorgelikis as Serge Gainsbourg; Drag Couenne as Michel Daerden; Mademoiselle Boop as Amélie Nothomb; Peach as Dominique Lehmann; Susan as Sœur Sourire; Valenciaga as Vanessa Paradis; On the runway, category is Mille et une Audrey Hepburn (One Thousand and One Audrey Hepburn's). Drag Couenne and Mademoiselle Boop receive positive critiques, with Mademoiselle Boop winning the challenge. Athena Sorgelikis, Peach and Valenciaga receive negative critiques, with Athena Sorgelikis being safe. Peach and Valenciaga lip-sync to "The Feeling" by Gabry Ponte and Henri PFR. Peach wins the lip-sync and Valenciaga sashays away.: Guest Judge: Plastic Bertrand; Mini-Challenge: Lip-sync to RuPaul's "Bring Back My Girls" in pairs; Mini-Challenge Winners: Mademoiselle Boop and Susan; Main Challenge: Snatch Game; Runway Theme: Mille et une Audrey Hepburn (One Thousand and One Audrey Hepburn's); Challenge Winner: Mademoiselle Boop; Challenge Prize: A skydiving trip from Sky Dive Spa; Bottom Two: Peach and Valenciaga; Lip-Sync Song: "The Feeling" by Gabry Ponte and Henri PFR; Eliminated: Valenciaga; Farewell Message: "Lae belleau est partie, les moches restent, bon courage les filles. 💋" ("The beautiful one is gone, the ugly ones stay, good luck girls. 💋")
6	6	"A deux c'est mieux"	23 March 2023
For this week's mini-challenge, the queens match members of the pit crew based on the portrait taped to their backs. Peach wins the mini-challenge. For the main challenge, the queens makeover Belgian TV personalities. On the runway, category is Portraits de Famille (Family Portrait). Athena Sorgelikis and Drag Couenne receive positive critiques, with Athena Sorgelikis winning the challenge. Mademoiselle Boop, Peach and Susan receive negative critiques, with Susan being safe. Mademoiselle Boop and Peach lip-sync to "J'aime la vie" by Sandra Kim. Mademoiselle Boop wins the lip-sync and Peach sashays away.: Guest Judges: David Jeanmotte and Sandra Kim; Mini-Challenge: Match members of the pit crew based on the portrait taped to their backs; Mini-Challenge Winner: Peach; Main Challenge: Makeover Belgian TV personalities; Runway Theme: Portraits de Famille (Family Portrait); Challenge Winner: Athena Sorgelikis; Challenge Prize: Two tickets the Eurovision Song Contest; Bottom Two: Mademoiselle Boop and Peach; Lip-Sync Song: "J'aime la vie" by Sandra Kim; Eliminated: Peach; Farewell Message: "À plus les putes. Garder la pêche. 💋" ("See you later whores. Keep it fresh. 💋")
7	7	"Discour de reine"	30 March 2023
For this week's mini-challenge, the queens get into drag in total darkness using only the products provided. Mademoiselle Boop wins the mini-challenge. For the main challenge, the queens write and deliver an inspiring and humorous speech to become Queen of Belgium. On the runway, category is Glamour à Knokke-le-Zoute (Glamour of Knokke-le-Zoute). Drag Couenne wins the challenge. Athena Sorgelikis, Mademoiselle Boop and Susan receive negative critiques, with Susan being safe. Athena Sorgelikis and Mademoiselle Boop lip-sync to "Le Banana Split" by Lio. Athena Sorgelikis wins the lip-sync and Mademoiselle Boop sashays away.: Guest Judge: Lio; Mini-Challenge: Get into drag in total darkness using only the products provided; Mini-Challenge Winner: Mademoiselle Boop; Main Challenge: Write and deliver an inspiring and humorous speech to become Queen of Belgium; Runway Theme: Glamour à Knokke-le-Zoute (Glamour of Knokke-le-Zoute); Challenge Winner: Drag Couenne; Challenge Prize: A cruise experience from The Cruise; Bottom Two: Athena Sorgelikis and Mademoiselle Boop; Lip-Sync Song: "Le Banana Split" by Lio; Eliminated: Mademoiselle Boop; Farewell Message: "Je suis tellement fier.e de nous toustes ! Mes reines...💗 Athena, tu mérites cette place en finale... Et n'oubliez pas de faire de vos faiblesses DES FORCES ! Je vous aime, Monsieur BOB !" ("I am so proud of all of us! My queens...💗 Athena, you deserve this place in the final... And don't forget to turn your weaknesses INTO STRENGTHS! I love you, Mr. BOB!")
8	8	"Grande Finale"	6 April 2023
For the final challenge of the season, the queens write, record and perform their own verse to Laura Crowet and Eric Renwart's song "Fierce" On the runway, category is Eleganza Extravaganza. The eliminated queens all return to the runway. It is revealed that Valenciaga is this season's Miss Congeniality. Susan is eliminated, leaving Athena Sorgelikis and Drag Couenne as the top two queens of the season. They lip-sync to "Démons" by Angèle ft. Damso. It is announced that Drag Couenne is the winner, leaving Athena Sorgelikis as the runner-up.: Guest Judges: Elena Gambardella and Vanessa Van Cartier; Main Challenge: Write and record your own verse for and perform to Laura Crowet and Eric Renwart's song "Fierce"; Runway Theme: Eleganza Extravaganza; Eliminated: Susan; Top Two: Athena Sorgelikis and Drag Couenne; Lip-Sync Song: "Démons" by Angèle ft. Damso; Runner-up: Athena Sorgelikis; Winner of Drag Race Belgique Season One: Drag Couenne
