= Red Sebastian =

Belgian musical artist

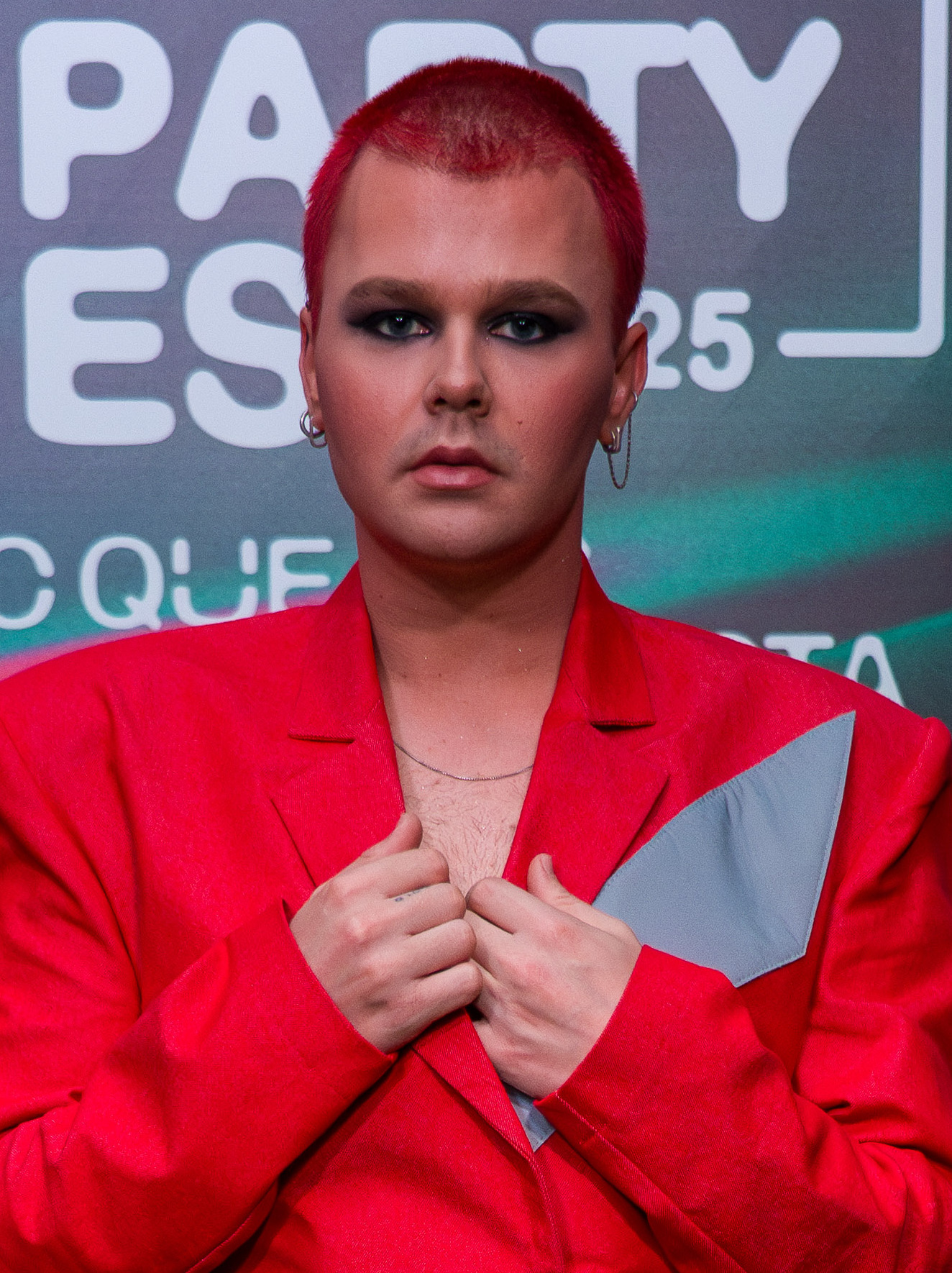
- Red Sebastian in 2025

Background information
- Born: Seppe Guido Yvonne Herreman; 13 May 1999 (age 27); Ostend, Belgium
- Genre: Electro-pop
- Occupations: Singer; songwriter
- Instruments: Vocals; piano
- Years active: 2019–present
- Label: CNR Records
- Website: redsebastian.be

Seppe Guido Yvonne Herreman (pronounced [ˈsɛpə ˈhɛrəˌmɑn]; born 13 May 1999), known professionally as Red Sebastian, is a Belgian singer-songwriter. He represented Belgium in the Eurovision Song Contest 2025 with the song "Strobe Lights”.

== Career ==
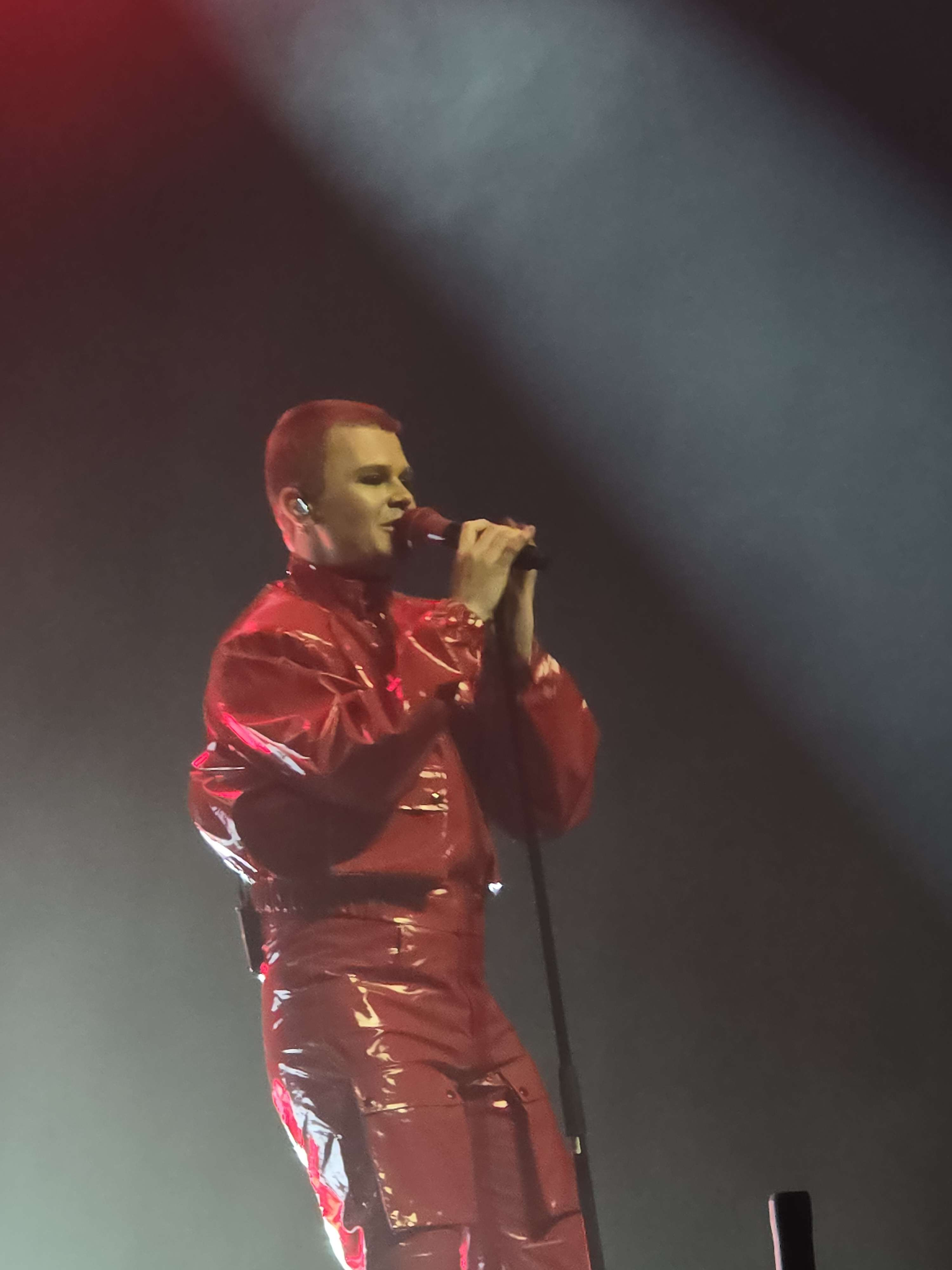
Red Sebastian performing at the Eurovision in Concert preparty event in 2025

Seppe Herreman was born on 13 May 1999 in the coastal city Ostend of Belgium. In 2013 he participated at the age of fourteen in the second season of the television show Belgium's Got Talent on the Flemish TV channel VTM. With the song "Ain't No Other Man" from the American singer Christina Aguilera he made it to the final. After high school Herreman studied singing at the Royal Academy of Fine Arts (KASK) in Ghent. There he was taught by Flemish singer Gustaph, among others. Herreman also plays the piano since he was nine.

In 2019 he continued his career using the name Red Sebastian, inspired by the red Jamaican-accented singing crab Sebastian from the 1989 Disney movie The Little Mermaid. Herreman was a big fan of the movie when he was little. He released his debut album called "You" in 2021, with "Embrace Me" being the lead single. In 2024, he participated in the VTM talent TV show Sing Again, where he made it to the final.

In 2025, after having signed a contract with the record label CNR Records, Red Sebastian was one of the eight finalists of the television contest Eurosong 2025, hosted on the Flemish TV channel VRT 1, with his song "Strobe Lights". It's his tribute to the Belgian rave culture. He became the final winner with a total of 423 points, thus earning the right to represent Belgium in the Eurovision Song Contest 2025. He competed in the first semi-final on 13 May 2025, where he failed to qualify to the grand final, finishing 14th out of 15 contestants.

== Personal life ==
Red Sebastian lives in the city of Ghent. He owns a cat named Duchesse, and says that Christina Aguilera was one of the reasons he started singing. He also enjoys karaoke. He identifies as part of the LGBTQ+ community.

== Discography ==
=== Albums ===
Title	Details	Peak chart positions
Title	Details	BEL (FL)
You	Released: 5 November 2021; Label: Self-released; Format: Digital download, streaming	—
Turn On The Lights	Released: 12 September 2025; Label: CNR Records; Format: CD, digital download, streaming	19

=== EPs ===
Title	Details
Bedroom Secrets	Released: 8 December 2023; Label: Self-released; Format: Digital download, streaming

=== Singles ===
Title	Year	Peak chart positions		Album
Title	Year	BEL (FL)	LTU	Album
"Embrace Me"	2021	—	—	You
"Fading Away"	2021	—	—	You
"Keep Going Back to You" (with Lewka and Time To Talk)	2021	—	—	Non-album single
"Some Kinda Way"	2021	—	—	You
"You"	2021	—	—	You
"Letting Go"	2023	—	—	Non-album single
"Soft Suede"	2023	—	—	Bedroom Secrets
"Appetite"	2023	—	—	Bedroom Secrets
"In Your Eyes"	2024	—	—	Non-album single
"Strobe Lights"	2025	5	88	Turn On The Lights
"Slay"	2025	—	—	Turn On The Lights
"Champion"	2026	—	—	Non-album singles
"Dance ('Til I Die)"	2026	—	—	Non-album singles
"—" denotes a recording that did not chart or was not released in that territory.

== Awards and nominations ==
Year	Award	Category	Nominee(s)	Result	Ref.
2025	Eurovision Awards	Artistic Vision	Himself	Nominated	

Awards and achievements
Preceded by Mustii with "Before the Party's Over"	Belgium in the Eurovision Song Contest; 2025	Succeeded by Essyla with "Dancing on the Ice"
