= Essyla =

Belgian singer (born 1996)

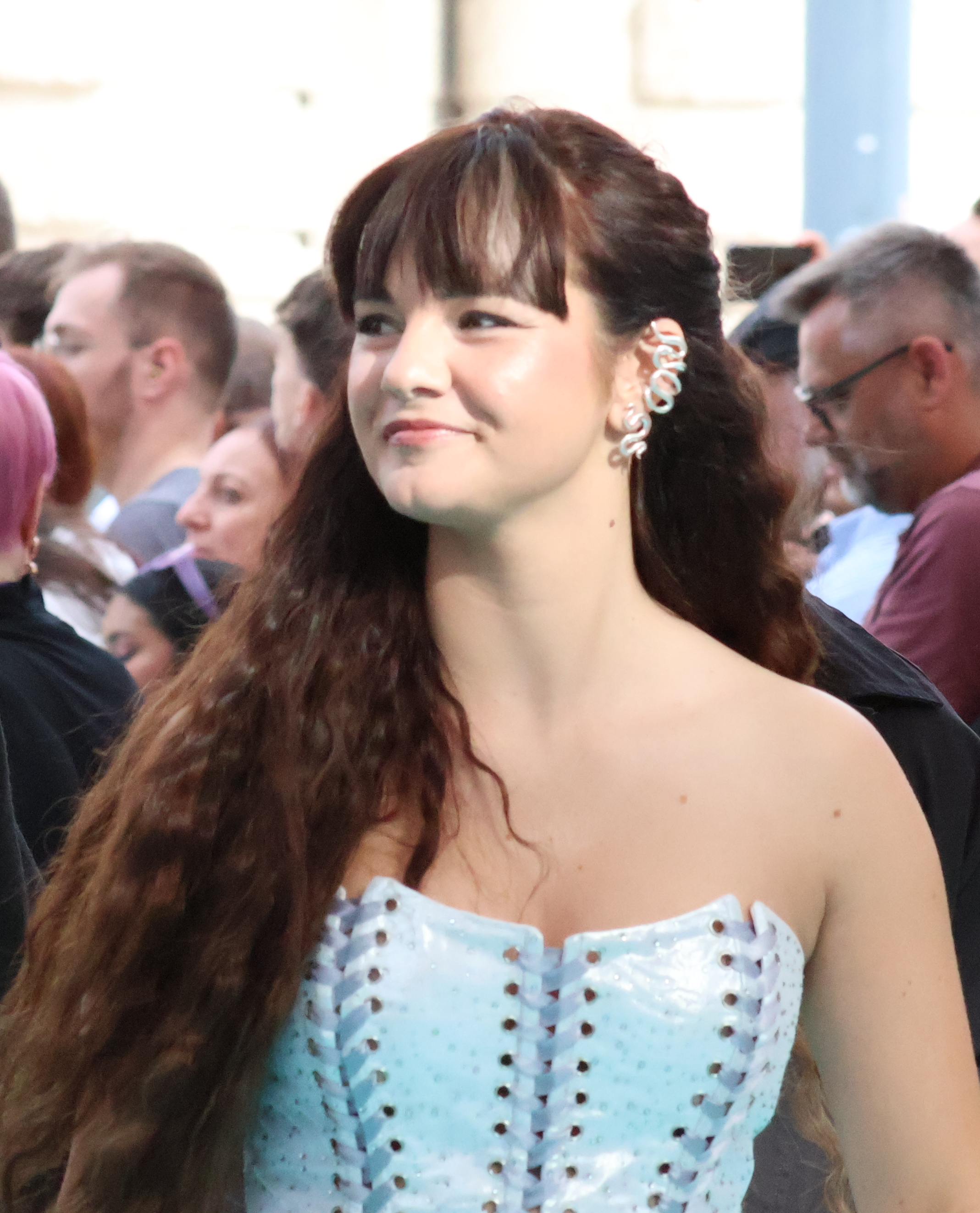
- Essyla in 2026

Background information
- Born: Alice Van Eesbeeck; 30 March 1996 (age 30); Perwez, Walloon Brabant, Belgium
- Genres: Pop; jazz; folk; rock; funk
- Occupations: Singer; songwriter
- Years active: 2019–present
- Label: Blue Milk

Alice Van Eesbeeck (born 30 March 1996), known professionally as Essyla (often stylized in all caps), is a Belgian singer and songwriter. In 2020, she rose to prominence as a finalist on the ninth season of The Voice Belgique. She represented Belgium in the Eurovision Song Contest 2026 with the song "Dancing on the Ice".

== Early life and education ==
Essyla was born in Perwez, Walloon Brabant, Belgium. She grew up in a musical environment, between Flanders, where her father resides, and Walloon Brabant, where her mother lives. Her stage name, "Essyla", is her birth name "Alice" backwards.

She attended the Royal Superior Institute of Music and Pedagogy (IMEP) in Namur. She was heavily influenced by French chanson and later developed an appreciation for American jazz, folk, rock, and funk.

== Career ==
In 2020, Essyla, then performing under her birth name, competed during the ninth season of The Voice Belgique, where she joined the team of Belgian singer Typh Barrow. She ultimately finished as the runner-up to Jérémie Makiese, who later represented Belgium at the Eurovision Song Contest 2022. Prior to this, she participated in the Eurovision Choir 2019 in Gothenburg, Sweden, as part of the choir Almakalia who represented Belgium.

Following The Voice Belgique, Essyla began building a solo career while working as a backing vocalist for established artists, including her former coach Typh Barrow and rapper Ben'do. In 2023, she released her debut single "Let You Go". That same year, she released her first extended play, I'll Be Okay.

On 19 February 2026, it was announced that she would be representing Belgium in the Eurovision Song Contest 2026 with the song "Dancing on the Ice". She qualified from the first semifinal and finished 21st out of 25 in the Grand Final with 36 points, all of which came from the national juries.

== Discography ==
=== Extended plays ===
Title	Details
I'll Be Okay	Released: 13 October 2023; Label: Blue Milk; Formats: Digital download, streaming

=== Singles ===
==== As lead artist ====
Title	Year	Peak chart positions	Album or EP
Title	Year	BEL (FL)	Album or EP
"Let You Go"	2023	—	I'll Be Okay
"Not My Kind of Dude"	2023	—	I'll Be Okay
"Your Letters"	2024	—	I'll Be Okay
"Alone Tonight"	2024	—	I'll Be Okay
"Tip Toe"	2025	—	Non-album single
"Dancing on the Ice"	2026	39	TBA
"Trauma Show"	2026	—	TBA
"In My Body"	2026	—	TBA

==== As featured artist ====
Title	Year	Album or EP
"Des larmes de toi" (Arty Leiso featuring Essyla)	2025	Éclipse

Awards and achievements
Preceded by Red Sebastian with "Strobe Lights"	Belgium in the Eurovision Song Contest; 2026	Succeeded by TBA
