= Madame Yoko (drag queen) =

Vietnamese-born Belgian-Luxembourgish drag queen

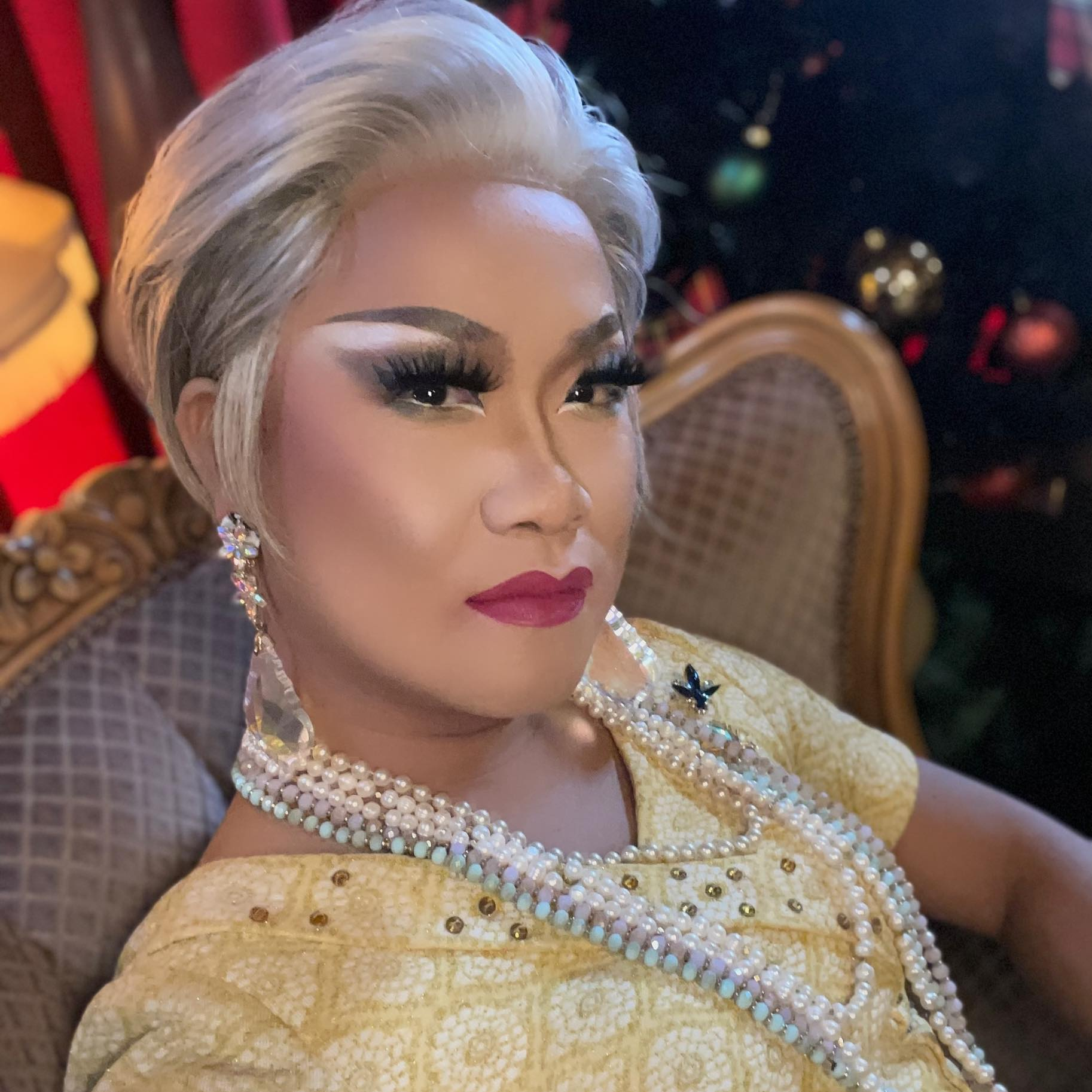
- Madame Yoko in 2022
- Born: Ian Lejeune; 1990 or 1991 (age 35–36); Cần Thơ, Vietnam
- Other names: Lady Sushi
- Occupation: Drag queen
- Years active: 2016–
- Known for: Drag Race Belgique; Drag Race Philippines: Slaysian Royale

Madame Yoko is the stage name of Ian Lejeune, a Vietnamese-born Belgian-Luxembourgish drag performer who competed on the second season of Drag Race Belgique and on Drag Race Philippines: Slaysian Royale.

== Early life ==
Ian Lejeune was born in Vietnam and adopted by parents from Radelange, Martelange, Belgium. He attended primary school in Martelange and secondary school at the Athénée royal d'Arlon in Arlon. Lejeune was openly gay as a teenager. He studied interior design at the Institut Saint-Luc in Liège and Brussels.

== Career ==
Lejeune began performing in drag on April 16, 2016 under the name Lady Sushi. Lady Sushi's first performance was to the song "Blue Jeans" by Lana Del Rey. She saw her first drag show at La Boule Rouge in Brussels. Her "drag mother" is the Swiss drag queen Catherine d'Oex. Catherine, not wanting to call her Lady Sushi, began referring to her as Yoko in reference to the science fiction comic strip Yoko Tsuno. The idea to add the title "Madame" to her name came from Chez Maman, a popular gay bar in Brussels. She ran the Brasserie Barnum drag cabaret and restaurant in Redange-sur-Attert with her husband, Alex Goedert, from 2019 until its closing in 2024.

Madame Yoko was announced as part of the cast of Drag Race Belgique season 2 in 2024, becoming the first Asian contestant on the show and the first Luxembourgish contestant on the Drag Race franchise. She placed eighth out of nine contestants, being eliminated on the third episode after losing a lip-sync to "Bruxelles je t'aime" by Angèle against La Veuve. In 2025, she was revealed as a part of the inaugural Drag Race Philippines: Slaysian Royale cast. In 2025, she auditioned to be a part of Luxembourg Song Contest 2026, Luxembourg's national selection for the Eurovision Song Contest 2026, having submitted two songs, but failed to advance past the initial audition with either.

== Filmography ==
- Drag Race Belgique
- Drag Race Philippines: Slaysian Royale
