= Drag Couenne =

Belgian drag performer

- Born: Adrien de Biasi; Belgium
- Occupation: Drag queen
- Television: Drag Race Belgique (season 1)

Drag Couenne is the stage name of Adrien de Biasi, a Belgian drag performer most known for winning the first season of Drag Race Belgique.

== Personal life ==
As of 2023, de Biasi were based in Brussels.

== Filmography ==
=== Television ===
Year	Title	Role	Notes	Ref
2023	Drag Race Belgique	Herself	Season 1, Winner	
2023	The Dancer Belgique	Herself	Guest performer with Mustii & the cast of Drag Race Belgique	
2023	La Première	Herself	Guest	
2023	Le 8/9	Herself	Guest	

- Bring Back My Girls (2024)

=== Film ===
Year	Title	Role	Notes	Ref
2024	Queens of Drama (Les Reines de la drame)	Herself		

=== Web series ===
Year	Title	Role	Notes	Ref
2023	Meet the Queens	Herself	Stand-alone special Drag Race Belgique Season 1	
2023	La DH les Sports	Herself	Guest	
2023	RTBF Info	Herself	Guest	

== Discography ==
=== Featured singles ===
Title	Year	Album	Ref
"Fierce" (With Athena Sorgelikis & Susan feat. Laura Crowet and Eric Renwar)	2023	Non-album singles	

=== Music videos ===
Year	Title	Artist	Ref
2023	"Fierce"	With Athena Sorgelikis & Susan feat. Laura Crowet and Eric Renwar	
