= Stefanie Callebaut =

Belgian singer-songwriter (born 2002)

- Born: 25 May 1986 (age 39); Kortrijk, West Flanders, Belgium
- Genres: Pop
- Occupations: Singer; songwriter
- Instruments: Vocals; keyboard
- Years active: 2005–present
- Formerly of: SX

Stefanie Callebaut (born 25 May 1986) is a Flemish singer-songwriter. Stefanie was the frontwoman of the Belgian band SX from 2009 to 2022. Stefanie mainly sings in English but has also recorded songs in the West Flemish language. In 2025, she was one of the candidates for Eurosong 2025.

== Musical career ==
Callebaut first became known in 2005 through her participation in Star Academy, where she finished 12th. In 2009, she co-founded the indie pop band SX with some Kortrijk residents. The group made three studio albums and scored hits with Gold and Black Video. In 2022, the band retired, after an acoustic farewell tour through Flanders.

After a short break, Callebaut recorded music again and took part in the program Ik vraag het aan. At the end of 2024, she was announced as one of the eight candidates for Eurosong 2025, hosted on the Flemish TV channel VRT 1, with the song "Gloria". She finished in fifth place with a total of 111 points,
