= Alvilda (drag queen) =

Belgian drag performer

- Born: Alexandre; 1994 or 1995 (age 30–31); Nivelles, Wallonia, Belgium
- Occupation: Drag queen
- Television: Drag Race Belgique (season 2)

Alvilda (real first name Alexandre) is a Belgian drag performer who won the second season of Drag Race Belgique. On the show, Alvilda won three main challenges.

== Early life and career ==
Alvilda was born in 1994 or 1995 and raised in Nivelles, Wallonia. Alvilda began performing in drag in 2019, but was forced into a hiatus by the COVID-19 pandemic. She played football for a decade and was an actor and comedian before deciding to attend makeup school, where a classmate convinced her to go out in drag with him. The two were invited to an open mic night and her friend didn’t want to perform solo, so she agreed to perform as well– beginning her drag career. Her stage name is derived from the legendary Geatish pirate of the same name. She resumed performing in 2021 as a resident queen at Cabaret Mademoiselle in Brussels. Her "drag mother" is Sasha Velour.

In 2023, Alvilda was announced to be part of the cast of the second season of Drag Race Belgique. She would later go on to win the competition.

== Personal life ==
As of 2024 she is based in Brussels. She has listed her inspirations to be Jean-Michel Basquiat, Sasha Velour, the club kid movement and fetish art.

== Discography ==
=== As Featured Artist ===
Year	Title	Album	Writer(s)	Producer(s)
2024	"Be Yourself" (The Cast of Drag Race Belgique)	Non-Album/Single	N/A	N/A
2024	"L'Union fait la force"	Non-Album/Single.	N/A	N/A
