= SX (band) =

Belgian indie pop band

- Origin: Kortrijk, Belgium
- Genres: Indie pop
- Years active: 2009–2022
- Labels: Clay
- Members: Benjamin Desmet; Stefanie Callebaut; Sebastiaan Van den Branden; Christophe Claeys
- Past members: Jeroen Termote
- Website: www.sxmusic.be

SX was a Belgian aetheric indie pop group from Kortrijk, Belgium. The band was formed in the spring of 2009 and disbanded in 2022.

== History ==
SX was founded in the spring of 2009 by Benjamin Desmet (keyboard, guitar) and Stefanie Callebaut (voice, keyboard) With Mister Lion the group won the Road2Fame-challenge of TV channel TMF in June 2009. Three months later, the group won the public's prize during the final of talent show Westtalent. As radio channel Studio Brussel provided them both the Vi.be On Air-award and their attention, SX broke through in January 2011 with the record 'Black Video'. The video clip received positive criticism as well. On 26 May 2011 SX recorded three tracks (Black Video, Stop and Graffiti) in the Toots-Studio in Brussels. These tracks were broadcast in the Studio Brussel program Select and can still be heard at the Studio Brussel website. In 2011, the group went on tour through Germany, Netherlands and the United Kingdom. The group's debut album, Arche, was released in 2012. The follow-up, Alphabet, was released in 2016.

In February 2022, the group announced their retirement after a final acoustic tour that year.

== Name ==
Multiple interpretations are possible for the short name "SX". The technological tone of the term, the futuristic scope of the name and the referral to sex are a couple of examples singer Stefanie Callebaut gave during interviews.

== Discography ==
=== Albums ===
| Album(s) with hits in the Flemish Ultratop | Date of appearance | Date of entrance | Highest position | Number of weeks |
|---|---|---|---|---|
| Arche | 2012 | 10-11-2012 | 2 | 44 |
| Alphabet | 18-11-2016 | 26-11-2016 | 13 | 7 |

=== Singles ===
| Single(s) with hits in the Flemish Ultratop | Date of appearance | Date of entrance | Highest position | Number of weeks |
|---|---|---|---|---|
| "Black Video" | 07-03-2011 | 23-04-2011 | 31 | 11 |
| "Gold" | 2012 | 10-11-2012 | 36 | 4 |
| "Graffiti" | 2013 | 09-03-2013 | tip4 | - |
| "The Future" | 2013 | 22-06-2013 | tip37 | - |
| "Hurts" | 2016 | 13-02-2016 | 40 | 1 |
| "Shimona" | 2016 | 23-04-2016 | tip35 | - |
| "Mercury" | 2016 | 16-07-2016 | tip | - |
| "Comfort" | 2016 | 29-10-2016 | tip10 | - |
| "Real Life" | 2019 | 04-05-2019 | tip49 | - |
