= Mademoiselle Boop =

Belgian drag performer

- Born: Renaud Delauvaux
- Occupation: Drag queen
- Television: Drag Race Belgique (season 1)

Mademoiselle Boop is the stage name of Renaud Delauvaux, a Belgian drag performer who competed on season 1 of Drag Race Belgique.

== Career ==
Mademoiselle Boop competed on season 1 of Drag Race Belgique. She impersonated Amélie Nothomb for the Snatch Game challenge. Mademoiselle Boop is known as a nightlife fixture and operates a cabaret venue in Brussels.

== Personal life ==
As of 2023 she is based in Brussels. In July 2025, Renault had announced their retirement from drag after 20 years of performing, citing their experience on Drag Race Belgium season 1.

== Filmography ==
=== Television ===
- Drag Race Belgique (season 1)
- Bring Back My Girls (2024)
