= Jérémie Makiese =

Belgian singer (born 2000)

- Born: 15 June 2000 (age 26); Antwerp, Belgium
- Origin: Uccle, Belgium
- Occupations: Singer; footballer
- Years active: 2021–present

JELLAM, also known by his legal name Jérémie Makiese (French pronunciation: [ʒeʁemi makjese, -eze]; born 15 June 2000) until June 2026, is a Belgian singer and footballer, who rose to fame after winning The Voice Belgique 2021. He represented Belgium at the Eurovision Song Contest 2022 with the song "Miss You" under his birth name.

== Early life ==
Makiese was born in Antwerp to Congolese parents. At 6 years old he and his family (including his three brothers and sister) moved to Berchem-Sainte-Agathe, then to Dilbeek a few years later, spending his childhood between the two municipalities, where he learned to speak both Dutch and French. They finally settled in Uccle.

Makiese took up singing from both of his parents (his mother also playing the tam-tam), starting in a church choir at a young age and later moving on to singing lessons at school, where he took part in, and won, a contest.

== Musical career ==
=== 2021: The Voice Belgique ===
Makiese auditioned for season nine of The Voice Belgique performing Labrinth's "Jealous", with all four coaches turning for him. He chose to join Beverly Jo Scott's team. In April 2021, he won the show.

The Voice Belgique Performances
	Song	Original Artist(s)	Notes
Blind Audition	"Jealous"	Labrinth	Four-chair turn, joins Team BJ Scott
Duel	"You Say"	Lauren Daigle	Won against Astrid Cuylits
Live Shows	"You're Nobody 'til Somebody Loves You"	James Arthur	
Live Shows	"Ça fait mal"	Christophe Maé	
Live Shows	"Feels Like Rain"	Buddy Guy	With B.J. Scott, Elsa Puls, and Mateo Rodriguez
Live Shows	"Say Something"	A Great Big World & Christina Aguilera	
Semifinal	"Ma philosophie"	Amel Bent	With Amel Bent and Sonita Ojong
Semifinal	"Leave the Door Open"	Silk Sonic (Bruno Mars & Anderson .Paak)	
Final	"Stop This Flame"	Celeste	With the other finalists
Final	"Earth Song"	Michael Jackson	
Final	"Nous"	Julien Doré	With Julien Doré and Sonita Ojong
Final	"Revival"	Gregory Porter	Duet with B.J. Scott
Final	"Jealous"	Labrinth	

=== 2022: Eurovision Song Contest ===
On 15 September 2021, broadcaster Radio-télévision belge de la Communauté française (RTBF) announced that they had internally selected Makiese to represent Belgium in the Eurovision Song Contest 2022 in Turin, Italy. He competed in the second semi-final, where he qualified for the Grand Final, where he finished 19th with 64 points.

== Artistry ==
=== Influences ===
Makiese cited Michael Jackson, Otis Redding, Gregory Porter, James Brown, Bill Withers and Aretha Franklin among his inspirations, as well as Damso and Stromae.

== Personal life and other activities ==
Makiese has reportedly always had an interest in football: at the age of 13, he started to play as a goalkeeper for BX Brussels. In September 2021, he signed a one-year contract with Excelsior Virton, after playing with Jeunesse Molenbeek, Royal Wallonia Walhain, and briefly with La Louvière Centre in summer 2021.

Following his success at The Voice Belgique, Makiese took a break from his higher studies in geology to focus on his singing and sports careers.

== Discography ==
=== Singles ===
==== As lead artist ====
List of singles, with selected chart positions
Title	Year	Peak chart positions					Album or EP
Title	Year	BEL (Fl)	BEL (Wa)	LTU	NLD Tip	SWE Heat.	Album or EP
"Miss You"	2022	1	3	17	11	12	Non-album singles
"Oasis"	2023	—	38	—	—	—	Non-album singles
"Saint-Honoré"	2024	—	—	—	—	—	Non-album singles
"Folie" (featuring Yeux Ébènes)	2025	—	—	—	—	—	Non-album singles
"Parano"	2025	—	—	—	—	—	Non-album singles
"Vida"	2025	—	—	—	—	—	Non-album singles
"Jeune Ndeko"	2025	—	—	—	—	—	Non-album singles
"Ebele" (with Pson)	2026	—	—	—	—	—	Non-album singles
"Mi amor"	2026	—	—	—	—	—	Non-album singles
"—" denotes a recording that did not chart or was not released in that territory.

==== As featured artist ====
Title	Year	Album or EP
"Mes affaires" (Sisik featuring Jérémie Makiese)	2025	Non-album singles
"J'ai capté" (Twinz featuring Jérémie Makiese and Yeux Ébenes)	2025	Non-album singles

Awards and achievements
Preceded by Charlotte Foret	The Voice Belgique winner 2020-21	Succeeded by Alec Golard
Preceded by Hooverphonic with "The Wrong Place"	Belgium in the Eurovision Song Contest; 2022	Succeeded by Gustaph with "Because of You"
