= Dancing on the Ice =

2026 single by Essyla

Single by Essyla
- Released: 19 February 2026
- Lyricists: Alice Van Eesbeeck; Barbara Petitjean; Emil Stengele; Nicolas d'Avell

Music videos
- "Dancing on the Ice" on YouTube "Dancing on the Ice" (piano version) on YouTube

Eurovision Song Contest 2026 entry
- Country: Belgium
- Artist: Essyla
- Languages: English
- Lyricists: Alice Van Eesbeeck; Barbara Petitjean; Emil Stengele; Nicolas d'Avell

Finals performance
- Semi-final result: 10th
- Semi-final points: 91
- Final result: 21st
- Final points: 36

Entry chronology
- ◄ "Strobe Lights" (2025)

Official performance video
- "Dancing on the Ice" (first semi-final) on YouTube "Dancing on the Ice" (grand final) on YouTube

"Dancing on the Ice" is a song by Belgian singer Essyla. It represented Belgium at the Eurovision Song Contest 2026, and finished in twenty-first place in the final. It reached number 39 in Flanders and 28 in Wallonia.

== Background and composition ==
"Dancing on the Ice" was composed by Emil Stengele, Nicolas d'Avell, and Alice Van Eesbeeck or Essyla and was written by Barbara Petitjean and Eesbeeck. In an interview with Neil Farren of Eurovoix, Essyla said participating in Eurovision was a dream since childhood. The song was written in a SABAM writing camp before Eurovision at the DAFT Studios in Malmedy, where Essyla, one of the 25 authors, composers, performers, and producers at the camp, attempted to find a more metallic and mature sound following her disco single "I'll Be Okay". The structure of the camp presented four teams per day, with at least one composer, one lyricist, one performer, and one producer. The song had to be composed in four hours; she was working with d'Avell in the camp, and he composed the song. In another interview with NRJ Belgique, she described the day she found out about her participation in Eurovision. She was working at a dental practice when somebody called her and said it was possible for Essyla to go to Eurovision, leading her to celebrate. To prepare for the contest, she focused on breathing, running on a high-speed treadmill while trying to sing.

According to Essyla, the song talks about moving forward, adding that there are "difficult moments in life" that we have to go through, and that we should "keep dancing on the ice, even if your knees are shaking, get up again if you fall and keep believing." Alyssia Delré of RTBF said of the meaning, "The track fits perfectly into Essyla's sophisticated electro-pop universe. Its message is intentionally universal: to keep moving forward and dancing, even when everything seems to be wavering. Here, dancing becomes a symbol of resilience and inner strength." Gianni Paelinck of VRT described it as a message of hope and determination of the youth. "When your legs are shaking, when you have a lot of problems, it's being able to continue dancing on the ice," Essyla said in VivaCité, adding that the song reflects on many things.

== Promotion ==
To promote "Dancing on the Ice", Essyla performed the song at the Eurovision in Concert 2026 on 11 April in Amsterdam.

== Eurovision Song Contest 2026 ==
=== Internal Selection ===
On 4 December 2025, RTBF confirmed its participation for Eurovision 2026. RTBF later announced that it would announce the act representing Belgium on 19 February 2026. On 19 February 2026, it was announced that Essyla would be the act representing Belgium with the song "Dancing on the Ice."

=== At Eurovision ===
The Eurovision Song Contest 2026 took place at Wiener Stadthalle in Vienna, Austria, and consisted of two semi-finals to be held on the respective dates of 12 and 14 May and the final on 16 May 2026. During the allocation draw held on 12 January 2026, Belgium was drawn to compete in the first-semi final, performing in the second half of the show.

In the first semi final, she performed eleventh and qualified for the final. In the final, she performed fourth, right after Israel's Noam Bettan and before Albania's Alis. The song finished in 21st place with 36 points, all of which came from the jury vote.

== Charts ==
Chart performance for "Dancing on the Ice"
Chart (2026)	Peak position
Belgium (Ultratop 50 Flanders)	39
Belgium (Ultratop 50 Wallonia)	28
Greece International (IFPI)	97
Lithuania (AGATA)	84
UK Singles Sales (OCC)	72
