= Gustaph (singer) =

Belgian singer-songwriter (born 1980)

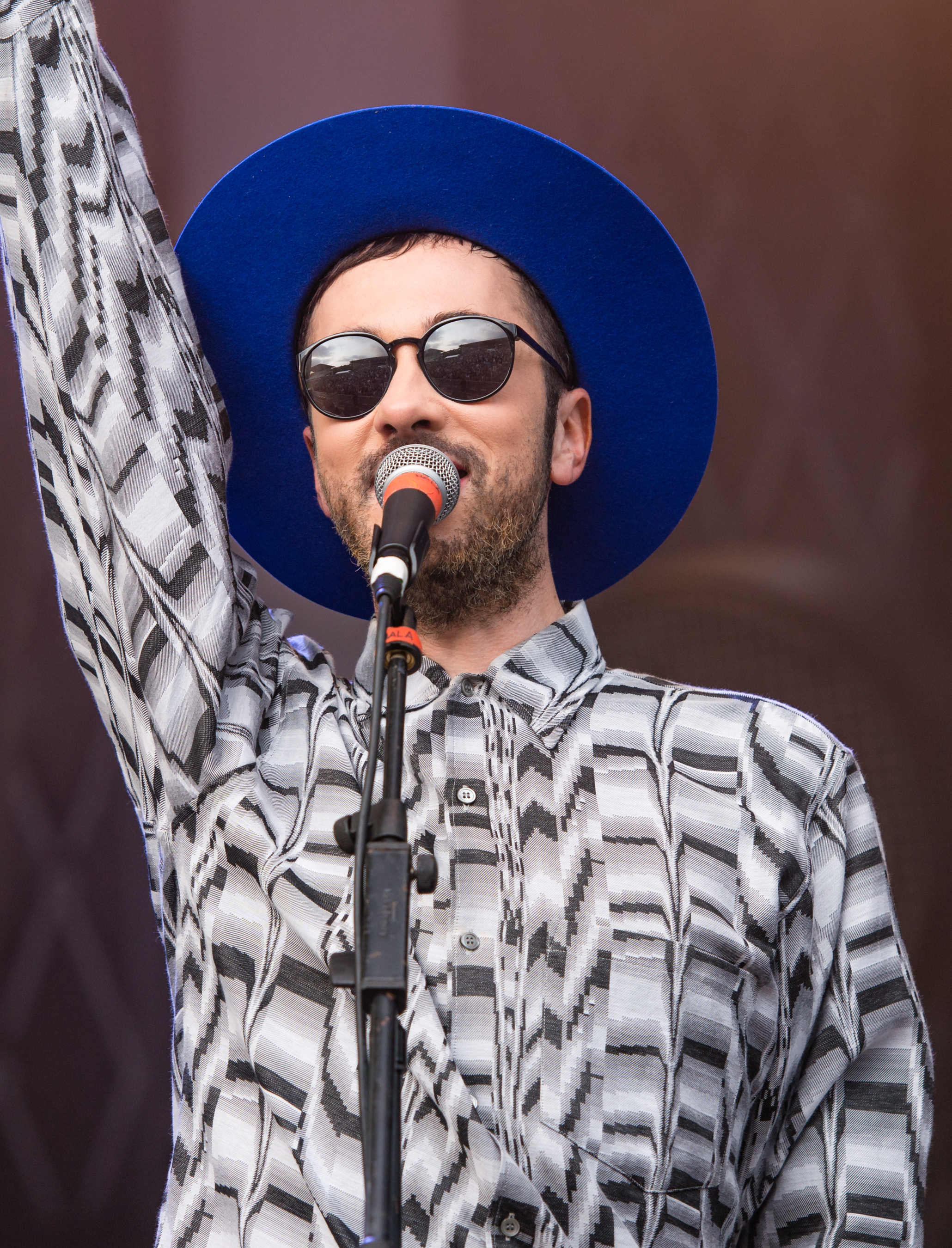
- Caers in 2014

Background information
- Also known as: Steffen
- Born: Stef Caers; 5 July 1980 (age 45); Leuven, Belgium
- Origin: Antwerp, Belgium
- Genres: Dance music
- Occupations: Singer-songwriter; producer; vocal coach
- Instruments: Vocals; piano; drums
- Years active: 1999–present

Stef Caers (Dutch pronunciation: [stɛf ˈkaːrs]; born 5 July 1980), known professionally as Gustaph, is a Belgian singer-songwriter, producer and vocal coach. He represented Belgium in the Eurovision Song Contest 2023 in Liverpool, United Kingdom with the song "Because of You" and finished 7th place.

== Biography ==
Caers was born on 5 July 1980 in Leuven, Flemish Brabant. He started his musical career while studying at the Royal Conservatory of Ghent, initially using the stage name Steffen. In 2000, he scored a hit with his debut single "Gonna Lose You", which reached number 22 on the Flemish singles chart. He subsequently released a second single, titled "Sweetest Thing".

Following these releases, Caers began focusing more on songwriting and producing. He also became active as a backing vocalist, providing backing vocals for, among others, Lady Linn and Willy Sommers. In the early 2010s, he joined the band Hercules and Love Affair as one of the lead vocalists.

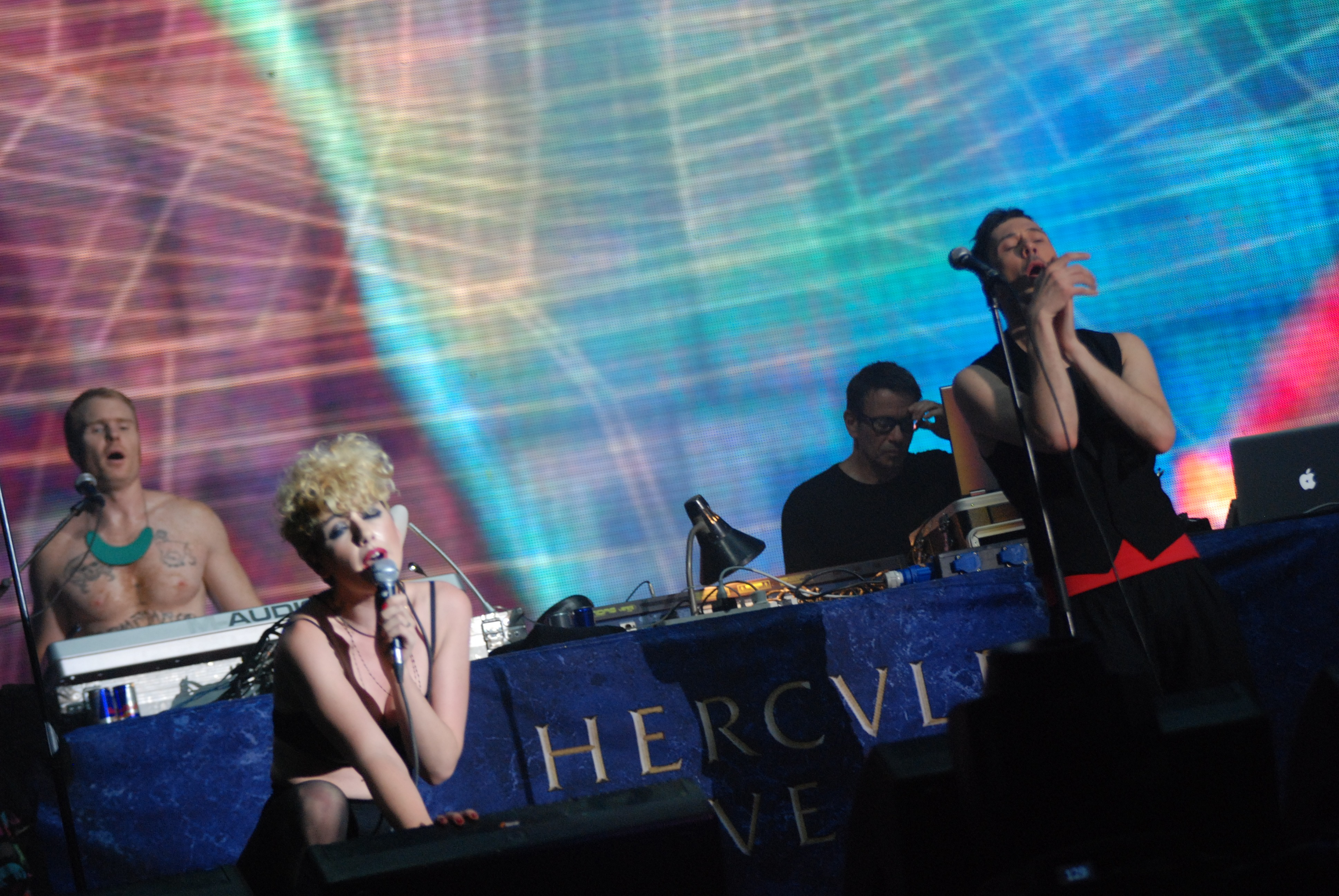
Caers (right) performing with Hercules and Love Affair in 2012

Caers performed as a backing vocalist for Sennek at the Eurovision Song Contest 2018 and for Hooverphonic at the Eurovision Song Contest 2021. In addition to his career as a singer, he works as a vocal coach, and as a teacher at the Royal Academy of Fine Arts (KASK) in Ghent.

In November 2022, Caers was announced as one of seven participants in Eurosong 2023, the Belgian national selection for the Eurovision Song Contest. His entry "Because of You" won the final on 14 January 2023 and represented Belgium in the Eurovision Song Contest 2023 in Liverpool, United Kingdom, finishing 7th place.

== Personal life ==
Caers is gay, and came out at the age of 14. He chose his stage name based on his father's godfather's name, Gustav.

== Discography ==
=== Studio albums ===
List of studio albums, with selected details
Title	Album details	Peak chart positions
Title	Album details	BEL (FL)
Look at Us Now	Released: 28 March 2025; Label: N.E.W.S.; Formats: CD, LP, digital download, streaming	5

=== Singles ===
==== As lead artist ====
Title	Year	Peak chart positions					Album or EP
Title	Year	BEL (FL)	AUS Digital	LTU	SWE	UK	Album or EP
"Gonna Lose You" (Note: Credited as Steffen.)	2000	22	—	*	—	—	Non-album singles
"Sweetest Thing"	2000	— (Note: "Sweetest Thing" did not enter the Ultratop 50, but peaked at number 11 on the Flemish Ultratip chart.)	—	*	—	—	Non-album singles
"Same Thing"	2011	—	—	*	—	—	Non-album singles
"Jaded"	2011	—	—	*	—	—	Non-album singles
"Second Coming" (with Adam Joseph)	2020	—	—	—	—	—	Non-album singles
"Call" (with Lady Linn)	2022	—	—	—	—	—	Non-album singles
"The Nail"	2023	—	—	—	—	—	Non-album singles
"Because of You"	2023	2	40	15	82	63	Look at Us Now
"Already Know"	2023	20	—	—	—	—	Look at Us Now
"Faith in What You Feel"	2024	29	—	—	—	—	Look at Us Now
"Calls Your Name"	2024	—	—	—	—	—	Look at Us Now
"Really Mine"	2025	34	—	—	—	—	Look at Us Now
"—" denotes a recording that did not chart or was not released in that territory. " * " denotes that the chart did not exist at that time.

==== As featured artist ====
Title	Year	Peak chart positions	Album
Title	Year	BEL (FL) Tip	Album
"Running" (Blende featuring Gustaph)	2014	51	Non-album single
"Vernissage" (MEROL featuring Gustaph)	2024		

== Notes ==
Awards and achievements
Preceded by Jérémie Makiese with "Miss You"	Belgium in the Eurovision Song Contest; 2023	Succeeded by Mustii with "Before the Party's Over"
