= Athena Sorgelikis =

Belgian drag performer

Athena Likis
- Born: Arnaud Tsiakas; Greece
- Other names: Athena Likis

Athena Likis, also known as Athena Sorgelikis, is the stage name of Arnaud Tsiakas, a Greek-born Belgian drag performer best known for appearing on the first seasons of Drag Race Belgique and RuPaul's Drag Race Global All Stars.

== Career ==
Athena competed on the first season of Drag Race Belgique (2023) and RuPaul's Drag Race Global All Stars. On Drag Race Belgique, she won the makeover and talent show challenges, and she ate a banana during one of her lip-sync contests. She was a runner-up. On Global All Stars, she was the first contestant to be eliminated from the competition, after losing a lip-sync contest against Soa de Muse.

== Personal life ==
Originally from Greece, Athena is based in Brussels as of 2023. Her drag name ("Athena") is inspired by the Greek goddess of wisdom and "Sorgelikis" comes from her "drag mother".

== Filmography ==
Year	Title	Role	Notes
2023	Drag Race Belgique	Herself	Contestant (2nd place)
2024	RuPaul's Drag Race Global All Stars	Herself	Contestant (12th place)
