= Elvis Pompilio =

Belgian fashion designer (born 1961)

- Born: 1961 (age 64–65); Liège

Elvis Pompilio (born 1961) is a Belgian fashion designer who specialises in hats.

== Early life ==
He was born in Liège to a family of Italian origin.

Pompilio entered business in 1987, with a workshop in Brussels where he produced designs for use in fashion shows by marques such as Dior and Valentino. In 1990, he opened a retail store in central Brussels. He later opened a store in Antwerp, followed by branches in Paris and London. His designs are sold in the United States and Japan.

Pompilio was a nominee on the RTBF show Le plus grand Belge (The Greatest Belgian) in 2005, finishing in 84th place.
