= Miss You (Jérémie Makiese song) =

2022 song by Jérémie Makiese

Single by Jérémie Makiese
- Language: English
- Released: 10 March 2022
- Genre: Contemporary R&B
- Length: 2:54
- Label: Universal Music Belgium
- Songwriters: Jérémie Makiese; Mike BGRZ; Manon Romiti; Paul Ivory; Silvio Lisbonne

Music video
- "Miss You" on YouTube

Eurovision Song Contest 2022 entry
- Country: Belgium
- Artist: Jérémie Makiese
- Composers: Jérémie Makiese; Mike BGRZ; Manon Romiti; Paul Ivory; Silvio Lisbonne
- Lyricists: Jérémie Makiese; Mike BGRZ; Manon Romiti; Paul Ivory; Silvio Lisbonne

Finals performance
- Semi-final result: 8th
- Semi-final points: 151
- Final result: 19th
- Final points: 64

Entry chronology
- ◄ "The Wrong Place" (2021)
- "Because of You" (2023) ►

"Miss You" is a song by Belgian singer Jérémie Makiese. It was released as a single on 10 March 2022, with the official music video being released on the Eurovision Song Contest's YouTube channel. The song represented Belgium in the Eurovision Song Contest 2022 in Turin, Italy after being internally selected by the Radio Télévision Belge de la Communauté Française (RTBF), Belgium's broadcaster for the Eurovision Song Contest.

== Release ==
The song was first released on 10 March 2 bc on Belgian radio show Le 8/9, with the song eventually being played on Belgian TV channel La Une, and shortly after the Eurovision Song Contest's YouTube channel.

== Eurovision Song Contest ==
=== Selection ===
RTBF announced on 15 September 2021 that they had internally selected Jérémie Makiese to represent Belgium in the Eurovision Song Contest 2022; the first broadcaster to do so for the 2022 edition.

=== At Eurovision ===
According to Eurovision rules, all nations with the exceptions of the host country and the "Big Five" (France, Germany, Italy, Spain and the United Kingdom) are required to qualify from one of two semi-finals in order to compete for the final; the top ten countries from each semi-final progress to the final. The European Broadcasting Union (EBU) split up the competing countries into six different pots based on voting patterns from previous contests, with countries with favourable voting histories put into the same pot. On 25 January 2022, an allocation draw was held which placed each country into one of the two semi-finals, as well as which half of the show they would perform in. Belgium was placed into the second semi-final, held on 12 May 2022, and performed 16th of the 18 countries in that show.

== Charts ==
=== Weekly charts ===
Weekly chart performance for "Miss You"
Chart (2022)	Peak position
Belgium (Ultratop 50 Flanders)	1
Belgium (Ultratop 50 Wallonia)	3
Iceland (Tónlistinn)	30
Lithuania (AGATA)	17
Netherlands (Single Tip)	11
Sweden Heatseeker (Sverigetopplistan)	12

=== Year-end charts ===
Year-end chart performance for "Miss You"
Chart (2022)	Position
Belgium (Ultratop 50 Flanders)	29
Belgium (Ultratop 50 Wallonia)	49

== Certifications ==
Certifications and sales for "Miss You"
Region	Certification	Certified units/sales
Belgium (BRMA)	Platinum	40,000^{‡}
^{‡} Sales+streaming figures based on certification alone.
