= Démons =

Single by Angèle featuring Damso

from the album Nonante-Cinq
- Released: 3 December 2021
- Recorded: 2021
- Genre: Pop rap; trap; R&B
- Length: 4:11
- Label: Angèle VL
- Songwriters: Angèle Van Laeken; William Kalubi Mwamba
- Producers: Angèle Van Laeken; Tristan Salvati

Angèle singles chronology
"Bruxelles je t'aime" (2021)	"Démons" (2021)	"Libre" (2022)

Damso singles chronology
"911" (2021)	"Démons" (2021)	"Dégaine" (2022)

Music video
- "Démons" on YouTube

"Démons" (French pronunciation: [demɔ̃]) is a song by Belgian artists Angèle and Damso. It was released on 3 December 2021.

== Charts ==
=== Weekly charts ===
Weekly chart performance for "Démons"
Chart (2022)	Peak position
Belgium (Ultratop 50 Wallonia)	2
France (SNEP)	5
Switzerland (Schweizer Hitparade)	31

=== Year-end charts ===
Year-end chart performance for "Démons"
Chart (2022)	Position
Belgium (Ultratop Wallonia)	6
France (SNEP)	17

== Certifications ==
Certifications for "Démons"
Region	Certification	Certified units/sales
Belgium (BRMA)	2× Platinum	40,000^{‡}
France (SNEP)	Diamond	333,333^{‡}
^{‡} Sales+streaming figures based on certification alone.
