= Mustii =

Belgian actor and singer

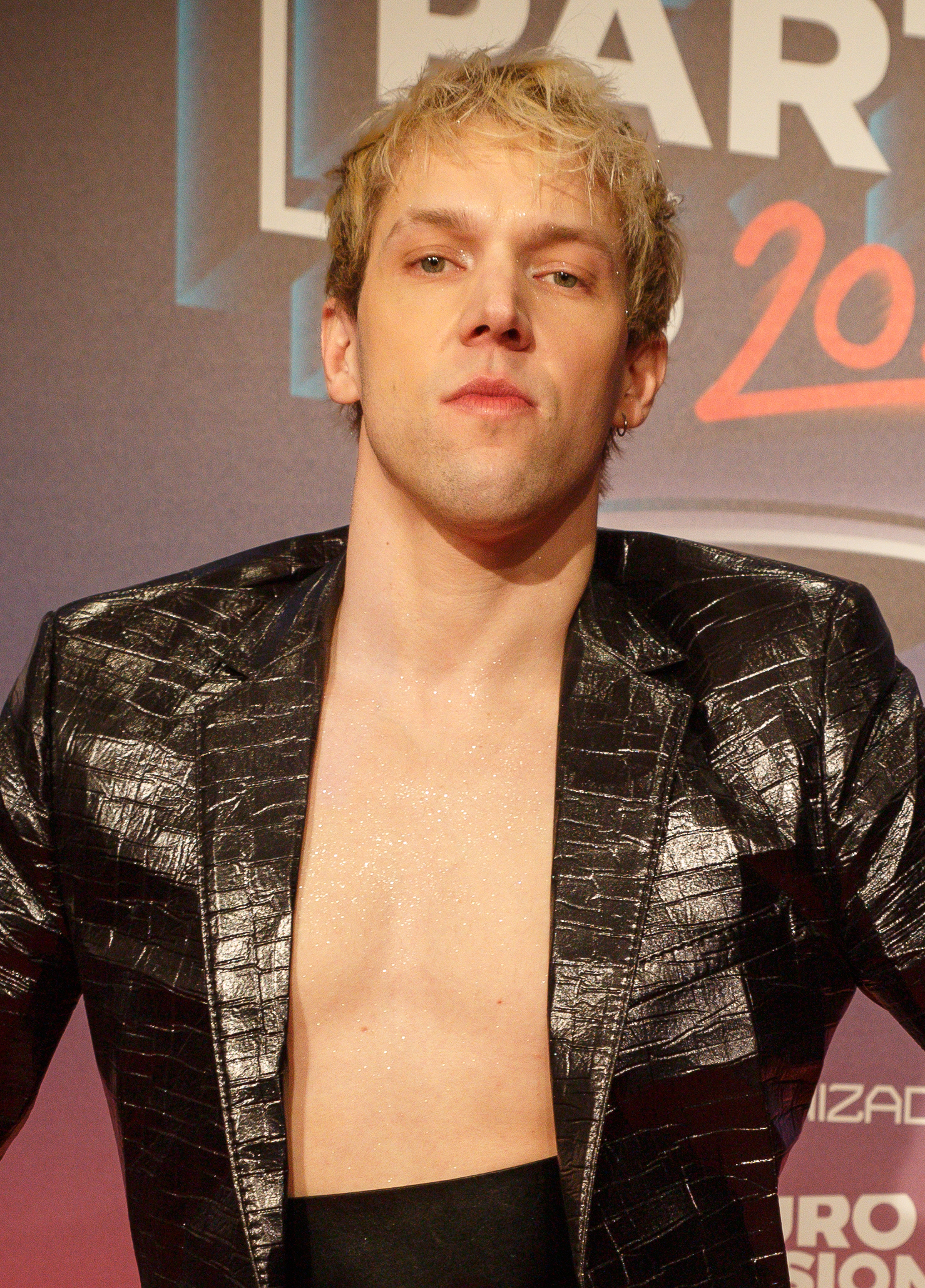
- Mustii in 2024
- Born: Thomas Michel Mustin; 21 November 1990 (age 35); Brussels, Belgium
- Occupations: Singer, actor
- Years active: 2012–present
- Television: Drag Race Belgique
- Musical career
- Labels: Warner Music Belgium; Black Gizah Records

Thomas Michel Mustin (French pronunciation: [tɔma miʃɛl mystɛ̃]; born 21 November 1990), better known by his stage name Mustii, is a Belgian actor and singer. As part of his career he has released two albums 21st Century Boy and It's Happening Now, which have both peaked inside the top ten of the Belgian Albums Charts. He is also known for being a judge on Drag Race Belgique.

Mustin represented Belgium in the Eurovision Song Contest 2024 in Sweden with the song "Before the Party's Over".

== Career ==
Mustin finished his studies in the theatre at the Institut des Arts de Diffusion (Louvain-la-Neuve) in 2012 and began to shoot for a French television series named À tort ou à raison, directed by Alain Brunard. He also performed on stage as Benvolio in Romeo and Juliet, directed by Yves Beaunesne. The play notably opened the new Théâtre de Liège.

He then embarked on the staging of the play Débris by Dennis Kelly, performed in November and December 2014 at the Riches-Claires in Brussels.

In early 2015, he took part in the revival of the show L'Auberge du Cheval-Blanc, directed by Dominique Serron at the Palais des Beaux-Arts in Charleroi and the Royal Opera of Wallonia. He then starred in two films and a television series. In the first film, he played alongside Romain Duris and Gustave Kervern in the French film, Odd Job (2016), directed by Pascal Chaumeil. In the second film, he starred alongside Fabrizio Rongione in Les Survivors, directed by Luc Jabon. In the television series, The Break (directed by Matthieu Donck), he plays the role of Kevin. The series was a great success in Belgium.

In 2014, Mustin signed a contract with Kid Noize's label, Black Gizah Record. His first single, "The Golden Age", was quickly broadcast on many Belgian radio stations in Flanders and Wallonia.

In December 2016, he was nominated six times at the D6bels Music Awards in the following categories: Male Solo Artist, Concert, Pure FM Artist/Group, Revelation, Music Video, and Songwriter. He leaves with the trophy for Revelation of the Year. On February 2, 2019, he received the Magritte Award for Most Promising Actor for the film The Royal Exchange. In September 2019, he was nominated at the Prix de la critique in the following category Male Revelation (Espoir masculin).

On 30 August 2023, it was announced that he would be representing Belgium in the Eurovision Song Contest 2024 in Malmö, Sweden. His entry, titled "Before the Party's Over", was released on 20 February 2024. He performed in the second semi-final of the event, on 9 May 2024, but failed to qualify to the final. It was later revealed that he finished 13th out of 16 in the semi-final, scoring 18 points.

== Discography ==
Mustii discography
- Studio albums: 3
- EPs: 3
- Singles: 10

=== Studio albums ===
List of studio album(s), with selected chart positions and details
Title	Album details	Peak chart positions
Title	Album details	BEL (Wa)
21st Century Boy	Released: 19 October 2018; Label: Warner Music Belgium; Formats: Digital download, streaming	5
It's Happening Now	Released: 21 January 2022; Label: Warner Music Belgium; Formats: Digital download, streaming	4
The Maze	Released: 6 December 2024; Label: PIAS Recordings; Formats: Digital download, streaming	19

=== Extended plays ===
List of extended play(s), with selected details
Title	EP details
The Golden Age	Released: 2015; Label: Black Gizah Records; Formats: Digital download, streaming
The Darkest Night	Released: 12 February 2016; Label: Black Gizah Records; Formats: Digital download, streaming
Shame - Remixes	Released: 30 December 2022; Label: Warner Music Benelux; Formats: Digital download, streaming

=== Singles ===
==== As lead artist ====
Title	Year	Peak chart positions				Certifications	Album
Title	Year	BEL (Wa)	BEL (Fl)	GRE	LTU	Certifications	Album
"The Golden Age"	2014	— (Note: "The Golden Age" did not enter the official Belgian Ultratop 50 chart, but peaked at No. 16 on the Walloon Ultratip Bubbling Under chart.)	— (Note: "The Golden Age" did not enter the official Belgian Ultratop 50 charts, but peaked at No. 13 on the Flanders Ultratip Bubbling Under chart.)	—	—		The Golden Age
"Feed Me"	2015	— (Note: "Feed Me" did not enter the official Belgian Ultratop 50 chart, but peaked at No. 21 on the Walloon Ultratip Bubbling Under chart.)	—	—	—		The Darkest Night
"21st Century Boy"	2018	9	—	—	—		21st Century Boy
"What a Day"	2018	24	— (Note: "What a Day" did not enter the official Belgian Ultratop 50 chart, but appeared on the Flanders Ultratip Bubbling Under chart.)	—	—		21st Century Boy
"Blind"	2018	11	—	—	—		21st Century Boy
"Time Is Up" (with Brut)	2020	— (Note: "Time Is Up" did not enter the official Belgian Ultratop 50 chart, but appeared on the Walloon Ultratip Bubbling Under chart.)	—	—	—		Non-album single
"Skyline"	2022	17	—	—	—		It's Happening Now
"Before the Party's Over"	2024	8	6	34	28	BRMA: Gold	The Maze
"Tell the Kids It's Alright"	2024	—	—	—	—		The Maze
"The Maze"	2024	—	—	—	—		The Maze
"—" denotes a recording that did not chart or was not released in that territory.

==== As featured artist ====
Title	Year	Album
"See You Again" (Evernest featuring Mustii)	2016	Static
"What About Ecosystem?" (Mumiy Troll featuring Mustii)	2021	Ecosystem

== Awards and nominations ==
Year	Award	Category	Nominee(s)	Result	Ref.
2016	D6bels Music Awards	Best Music Video	"Feed Me"	Nominated	
2016	D6bels Music Awards	Best Male Solo Artist	Himself	Nominated	
2016	D6bels Music Awards	Concert of the Year	Himself	Nominated	
2016	D6bels Music Awards	Best Pure FM Artist/Group	Himself	Nominated	
2016	D6bels Music Awards	Best Songwriter	Himself	Nominated	
2016	D6bels Music Awards	Revelation of the Year	Himself	Won	
2019	Magritte Award	Most Promising Actor	The Royal Exchange	Won	
2019	Prix de la critique	Male Revelation	Himself	Nominated	
2024	Eurovision Awards	Style Icon	Himself	Nominated	
2025	Magritte Awards	Best Supporting Actor	Night Call	Nominated	

== Notes ==
Awards and achievements
Preceded by Gustaph with "Because of You"	Belgium in the Eurovision Song Contest; 2024	Succeeded by Red Sebastian with "Strobe Lights"
