= Before the Party's Over =

2024 song by Mustii

Single by Mustii

from the album The Maze
- Released: 20 February 2024
- Length: 3:00
- Label: PIAS
- Songwriters: Alloysius Lloyd; Arianna D'amato; Benoit Leclercq; Charlotte Clark; Nina Sampermans; Pierre Dumoulin; Thomas Mustin
- Producers: Benoit Leclercq; Pierre Dumoulin; Tobie Speleman

Mustii singles chronology
"Skyline" (2022)	"Before the Party's Over" (2024)	"Tell the Kids It's Alright" (2024)

Music video
- "Before the Party's Over" on YouTube

Eurovision Song Contest 2024 entry
- Country: Belgium
- Artist: Mustii
- Language: English
- Composers: Pierre Dumoulin; Benoit Leclercq; Thomas Mustin
- Lyricists: Thomas Mustin; Nina Sampermans; Arianna D'amato; Charlotte Clark; Alloysius Lloyd

Finals performance
- Semi-final result: 13th
- Semi-final points: 18

Entry chronology
- ◄ "Because of You" (2023)
- "Strobe Lights" (2025) ►

Official performance video
- "Before the Party's Over" (Second Semi-Final) on YouTube

"Before the Party's Over" is a song by Belgian singer and actor Thomas Mustin, known as Mustii. It was released on 20 February 2024 by PIAS Recordings, and was written by Mustin along with six other songwriters. "Before the Party's Over" represented Belgium in the Eurovision Song Contest 2024, and finished in 13th place with 18 points at semi final two. The song entered the charts in Greece and Lithuania and reached the top ten within his home country of Belgium (Both in Flanders and Walloonia).

== Background and composition ==
"Before the Party's Over" was composed by Pierre Dumoulin, Benoit Leclercq, and Thomas Mustin, and written by Mustin, Nina Sampermans, Arianna D'amato, Alloysius Lloyd, and Charlotte Clark. In interviews, Mustin stated a desire to maintain an evolution of his musical style with the song, trying to change his style to become "pop with a dark edge". He also stated desires of displaying his true nature and a sense of flamboyance within the song. The song also features a chorus made from recordings of fan submissions that opened in January 2024.

According to Mustin, the song addresses a person's struggles and the "realiz[ation that] we need to look for our inner fire to fight it because we are running out of time". In an analysis by Wiwibloggs' Ruxandra Tudor, the song addresses "the choices we make" and reflection on those choices. Tudor also claimed that the song advocates one being true to themselves "in a world where we fake happiness through various distractions".

According to Mustin, he was approached to compete in Eurovision by Belgium's broadcaster for the contest in even-numbered years, Radio-télévision belge de la Communauté française (RTBF) while shooting an episode of Drag Race Belgique. He was later announced as Belgium's representative for the Eurovision Song Contest 2024 on 30 August 2023, with a projected release date of his song for the contest being slated for sometime in February. The day before the song premiered, Mustin announced the official song title. The song officially premiered on 20 February on the radio programme Le 8/9 on VivaCité; however, it was leaked two days earlier on Belgian radio station Tipik, which played the song in its entirety by accident.

== Promotion ==
To promote the song for Eurovision, Mustin announced his intent to participate in various Eurovision pre-parties, including Pre-Party ES 2024, the Barcelona Eurovision Party 2024, the London Eurovision Party 2024, Eurovision in Concert 2024, and the Nordic Eurovision Party 2024. In addition, he announced plans to perform the song during the semi-final of the 11th season of The Voice Belgique.

== Critical reception ==
In a Wiwibloggs review containing several reviews from several critics, the song was rated 7.4 out of 10 points, earning 10th on the site's annual ranking. Vulture's Jon O'Brien ranked the song 28th overall, describing it as "another of those sad-boy ballads that's become an unwelcome staple of late" and a "songwriting-camp template".

== Eurovision Song Contest ==
=== Internal selection ===
Belgium's broadcaster for the Eurovision Song Contest on even-numbered years, Radio-télévision belge de la Communauté française (RTBF), announced its intent to participate in the 2024 contest on 16 August 2023. 14 days later, Mustin was announced as the country's representative for the contest, with the song scheduled to come out sometime in February 2024. The song officially premiered on 20 February.

=== At Eurovision ===
The Eurovision Song Contest 2024 took place at the Malmö Arena in Malmö, Sweden, and consisted of two semi-finals held on the respective dates of 7 and 9 May and the final on 11 May 2024. During the allocation draw on 30 January 2024, Belgium was drawn to compete in the second semi-final, performing in the second half of the show. Mustin was later drawn to perform 12th in the semi-final, after Georgia's Nutsa Buzaladze and before Estonia's duo of 5miinust and Puuluup.

The Eurovision performance featured the singer in an Elke Oost-designed outfit surrounded by a circle of microphones and smoke.

== Track listing ==
Digital download/streaming

1. Before the Party's Over – 3:00

Digital download/streaming – Madism remix

1. Before the Party's Over (Madism remix) – 2:15
2. Before the Party's Over (Madism extended remix) – 3:07

== Charts ==
=== Weekly charts ===
Weekly chart performance for "Before the Party's Over"
Chart (2024)	Peak position
Belgium (Ultratop 50 Flanders)	6
Belgium (Ultratop 50 Wallonia)	8
Greece International (IFPI)	34
Lithuania (AGATA)	28

=== Year-end charts ===
Year-end chart performance for "Before the Party's Over"
Chart (2024)	Position
Belgium (Ultratop 50 Flanders)	78
Belgium (Ultratop 50 Wallonia)	66

== Certifications ==
Certifications for "Before the Party's Over"
Region	Certification	Certified units/sales
Belgium (BRMA)	Gold	20,000^{‡}
^{‡} Sales+streaming figures based on certification alone.

== Release history ==
Release history and formats for "Before the Party's Over"
Country	Date	Format(s)	Version	Label	Ref.
Various	20 February 2024	Digital download; streaming	Original	PIAS Recordings	
Various	5 July 2024	Digital download; streaming	Madism remix	PIAS Recordings	
