= Lufy =

Blogger and YouTuber from Italy

- Born: Fulvia; 1991 (age 33–34)
- Occupations: Blogger; Youtuber

Lufy is a Belgian blogger and YouTuber originally from Italy, specialized in fashion, cosmetics and lifestyle.

== Biography ==
Lufy, whose real name is Fulvia, was born in 1991. She is studying at the Faculty of Translation and Interpretation, School of International Interpreters, at the University of Mons.

On February 29, 2012, Lufy created her first official YouTube channel, LufyMakes YouUp, with the aim of centralizing makeup videos that she had produced and shared within private Facebook groups. Afterwards, she decided to dedicate herself entirely to making videos as well as managing her channel. The channel mainly focuses on makeup, fashion and lifestyle, and Lufy publishes at least one video per week. At the end of 2017, she reached a million subscribers.

Lufy gets paid to collaborate with several brands. About ten brands regularly send her products, which she then chooses whether or not to talk about.

In September 2017, Lufy was invited to participate in the TV show Place Royale, in which she analysed celebrities' looks. She also became a brand ambassador for L'Oréal.

In November 2017, Lufy and her partner, Enzo, were invited to the European Parliament in order to discuss communication in the digital era.

In August 2018, Lufy presented a new program on TFX: Beauty Match.

In 2023, she became a judge on Drag Race Belgique.
