= Strobe Lights =

2025 song by Red Sebastian

Single by Red Sebastian

from the album Turn On The Lights
- Released: 25 January 2025
- Genre: Techno
- Length: 2:58
- Label: CNR
- Songwriters: Astrid Roelants; Billie Simonne Lea Bentein; Seppe Guido Yvonne Herreman; Willem Vanderstichele
- Producer: Willem Vanderstichele

Red Sebastian singles chronology
"In Your Eyes" (2024)	"Strobe Lights" (2025)	"Slay" (2025)

Music video
- "Strobe Lights" on YouTube

Eurovision Song Contest 2025 entry
- Country: Belgium
- Artist: Red Sebastian
- Languages: English
- Composers: Astrid Roelants; Billie Simonne Lea Bentein; Seppe Guido Yvonne Herreman; Willem Vanderstichele
- Lyricists: Astrid Roelants; Billie Simonne Lea Bentein; Seppe Guido Yvonne Herreman; Willem Vanderstichele

Finals performance
- Semi-final result: 14th
- Semi-final points: 23

Entry chronology
- ◄ "Before the Party's Over" (2024)
- "Dancing on the Ice" (2026) ►

Official performance video
- "Strobe Lights" (first semi-final) on YouTube

"Strobe Lights" is a song by Belgian singer Red Sebastian. It was written by Sebastian, Astrid Roelants, Billie Bentein and Willem Vanderstichele (Hush), with production handled by Hush. The song represented Belgium in the Eurovision Song Contest 2025. It reached number five on the Belgian Singles Chart for Flanders.

== Background and composition ==
Strobe Lights was written by Sebastian, Astrid Roelants, Billie Bentein and Willem Vanderstichele (Hush), the last in whom produced the song. In an interview with the online testimonial L'Eurovision Au Quotidien, Sebastian described the song as a fun and flashing night out. Eva Frantz of Yle described "Strobe Lights" as a "suggestive and dark dance song".

== Eurovision Song Contest ==
=== Eurosong 2025 ===
Eurosong 2025 was the national final used to select Belgium's entry in the Eurovision Song Contest 2025. The competition consisted of two pre-recorded showcase shows that were broadcast on 18 and 25 January 2025, followed by a live final on 1 February 2025 where the winning song and artist was selected.

On 13 January 2025, VRT announced that it had selected "Strobe Lights" performed by Sebastian as one of the songs to compete in Eurosong 2025, the national final that it would organise to select its entry for the Eurovision Song Contest 2025. The song won Eurosong 2025 on 1 February 2025, where it came in first place overall by the jury, as well as the audience votes with 432 points, thus qualifying the song to represent Belgium at the Eurovision Song Contest.

=== At Eurovision ===
The Eurovision Song Contest 2025 took place at St. Jakobshalle in Basel, Switzerland, and consisted of two semi-finals held on the respective dates of 13 and 15 May and the final on 17 May 2025. During the allocation draw held on 28 January 2025, Belgium was drawn to compete in the first semi-final, performing in the second half of the show.

In the first semi final, Belgium performed 9th out of the 15 countries performing to qualify. Belgium did not qualify for the final.

== Charts ==
=== Weekly charts ===
Weekly chart performance for "Strobe Lights"
Chart (2025)	Peak position
Belgium (Ultratop 50 Flanders)	5
Lithuania (AGATA)	88

=== Year-end charts ===
Year-end chart performance for "Strobe Lights"
Chart (2025)	Position
Belgium (Ultratop 50 Flanders)	120

== Certifications ==
Certifications and sales for "Strobe Lights"
Region	Certification	Certified units/sales
Belgium (BRMA)	Gold	20,000^{‡}
^{‡} Sales+streaming figures based on certification alone.

== Release history ==
Release dates and formats for "Strobe Lights"
Region	Date	Format	Version	Label	Ref.
Various	25 January 2025	Digital download; streaming	Original	CNR	
Various	11 April 2025	7"	Original; extended	CNR	
