= Because of You (Gustaph song) =

2023 song by Gustaph

Single by Gustaph

from the album Look At Us Now
- Language: English
- Released: 13 January 2023
- Length: 2:59
- Songwriters: Stef Caers; Jaouad Alloul

Gustaph singles chronology
"The Nail" (2023)	"Because of You" (2023)

Music video
- "Because Of You" on YouTube "Because Of You" (Pride Edition) on YouTube

Eurovision Song Contest 2023 entry
- Country: Belgium
- Artist: Gustaph
- Composers: Stef Caers; Jaouad Alloul
- Lyricists: Stef Caers; Jaouad Alloul

Finals performance
- Semi-final result: 8th
- Semi-final points: 90
- Final result: 7th
- Final points: 182

Entry chronology
- ◄ "Miss You" (2022)
- "Before the Party's Over" (2024) ►

Official performance video
- "Because Of You" (Second Semi-Final) on YouTube "Because Of You" (Grand Final) on YouTube

"Because of You" is a song by Belgian singer Gustaph, released as a single on 13 January 2023. The song represented Belgium in the Eurovision Song Contest 2023 after winning Eurosong 2023, Belgium's national final for that year's Eurovision Song Contest. At the contest in finished in 7th place at the final, with 182 points. It reached number two on the Singles Charts for Flanders and was certified Platinum. Elsewhere it reached the charts in Australia, Lithuania, Sweden, Walloonia, Netherlands, and UK.

== Background ==
In an interview with Eurovision fansite ESC Bubble, Gustaph compared both of his songs for Eurosong 2023, "The Nail" and "Because of You". He described both songs as a call for celebrating freedom and "the joy to be yourself". Gustaph, who is gay, said that his experiences of being in the community and wanting to be himself inspired both songs. However, he described "Because of You" as a lighter, "club anthem" song. In other interviews with Wiwibloggs, Gustaph described the song as an "ode to the queer community", stating that his song was meaningful for people in the LGBTQ+ community.

== Eurovision Song Contest ==
=== Eurosong 2023 ===
Eurosong 2023 was the national final used to select Belgium's entry in the Eurovision Song Contest 2023. The competition consisted of five pre-recorded songclub shows that were broadcast between 9 and 13 January 2023, followed by a live final on 14 January 2023 where the winning song and artist were selected.

Seven artists were sought to compete in Eurosong. In the five songclub shows, the show featured each artist presenting their two candidate Eurovision songs in front of the six other artists, who provided commentary and feedback. Based on the feedback, the artist selected one of the two songs to proceed to the final. Gustaph presented his two songs, "The Nail" and "Because of You" on 12 January and 13 January, respectively. On 13 January, he revealed that he had chosen "Because of You" to take to the final of Eurosong 2023.

In the final, the winner was chosen by a combination of a jury vote and a public televote. Eleven jurors accounted for 50% of the vote, while the public decided the other 50%. "Because of You" earned 121 votes from the juries, earning the third jury spot overall. In the televote, "Because of You" earned 157 points, placing second overall with a total of 278 points. When the full voting results were revealed, the song was revealed as the winner, beating televote favourite "Rollercoaster" by one point due to the latter's lacklustre jury score of 94 points. "Because of You" was therefore scheduled to represent Belgium at Eurovision.

=== At Eurovision ===
According to Eurovision rules, all participating countries, with the exception of the host nation and the "Big Five", consisting of France, Germany, Italy, Spain and the United Kingdom, are required to qualify from one of two semi-finals in order to compete for the final; the top ten countries from each semi-final progress to the final. The European Broadcasting Union (EBU) split up the competing countries into six different pots based on voting patterns from previous contests, with countries with favourable voting histories put into the same pot. On 31 January 2023, an allocation draw was held, which placed each country into one of the two semi-finals, and determined which half of the show they would perform in. Belgium was placed into the second semi-final, held on 11 May 2023, and performed in the first half of the show in the fifth position.

The performance featured a cameo from vogueing dancer PussCee West. After qualifying from the second semi-final in eighth, they were placed to perform in the 16th position for the grand final. The song finished in seventh place with 182 points.

== Charts ==
=== Weekly charts ===
Weekly chart performance for "Because of You"
Chart (2023)	Peak position
Australia Digital Tracks (ARIA)	40
Belgium (Ultratop 50 Flanders)	2
Belgium (Ultratop 50 Wallonia)	34
Lithuania (AGATA)	15
Netherlands (Single Tip)	3
Sweden (Sverigetopplistan)	82
UK Singles (Official Charts)	63
UK Indie (Official Charts)	11

=== Year-end charts ===
Year-end chart performance for "Because of You"
Chart (2023)	Position
Belgium (Ultratop 50 Flanders)	9

== Certifications ==
Certifications and sales for "Because of You"
Region	Certification	Certified units/sales
Belgium (BRMA)	Platinum	40,000^{‡}
^{‡} Sales+streaming figures based on certification alone.
