= Drag Race Belgique =

Belgian reality television series

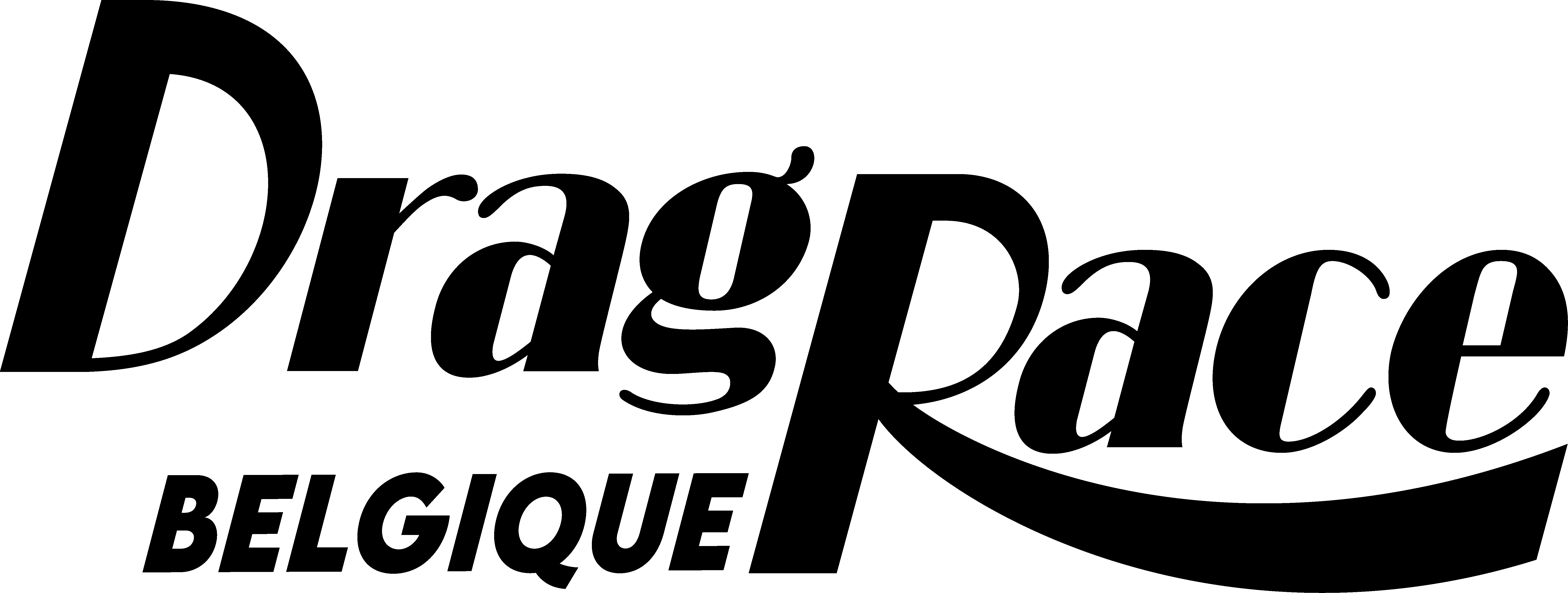
- Logo for Drag Race Belgique.
- Also known as: Drag Race Belgium
- Genre: Reality competition
- Directed by: Romain Leroux
- Presented by: Rita Baga
- Judges: Rita Baga; Lufy; Mustii; Lio
- Ending theme: "I'm a Winner, Baby (Skeltal Ki Remix)" (season 1); "Born Naked (Stadium Remix)" (season 2)
- Country of origin: Belgium
- No. of seasons: 2
- No. of episodes: 16

Production
- Executive producers: Fenton Bailey; Randy Barbato; Tom Campbell; RuPaul Charles
- Producer: Michaël De Lil
- Production companies: RTBF; World of Wonder

Original release
- Network: Tipik (Belgium); WOW Presents Plus (International)
- Release: 16 February 2023 – present

Related
- Drag Race franchise

Drag Race Belgique is a Belgian French-language reality competition television series based on the original American series RuPaul's Drag Race and part of the Drag Race franchise. It airs on Tipik and Auvio in Belgium and on WOW Presents Plus internationally.

Drag Race Belgique is the eleventh international adaptation of the American reality competition series RuPaul's Drag Race, following Chilean, Thai, British, Canadian, Dutch, Australian and New Zealand, Spanish, Italian, French, and Filipino versions. It has been followed by Swedish, Mexican, Brazilian, German, and South African iterations.

Drag Race Belgique debuted on 16 February 2023, on Tipik. Episodes premiere on a weekly basis every Thursday, and later aired on Auvio on primetime.

Drag Couenne won the first season, with Athena Sorgelikis as runners-up, while Valenciaga was named Miss Congeniality. In May 2023, the series was renewed for a second season.

== Production ==
=== Judges ===
The competition series is hosted and judged primarily by French Canadian drag queen Rita Baga, who competed in the first season of Canada's Drag Race and the first season of Canada vs. the World. Belgian-Italian entrepreneur and content creator Lufy and Belgian singer and actor Mustii, made appearances as the competition's prominent judges. Lio, who first appeared as a guest judge, replaced Lufy on the judging panel after the first season.

Judges on Drag Race Belgique
Judge	Season	
Judge	1	2
Rita Baga	Main	Main
Lufy	Main	
Mustii	Main	Main
Lio	Guest	Main

=== Contestants ===
Since 2023, there has been a total of 19 contestants featured in Drag Race Belgique.

== Series overview ==
Season	Contestants	Episodes	Originally released			Winner	Runner(s)-up	Miss Congeniality
Season	Contestants	Episodes	First released	Last released	Network	Winner	Runner(s)-up	Miss Congeniality
1	10	8	16 February 2023	6 April 2023	Tipik; Auvio	Drag Couenne	Athena Sorgelikis	Valenciaga
2	9	8	1 February 2024	21 March 2024	Tipik; Auvio	Alvilda	La Veuve	Star

=== Season 1 (2023) ===
In April 2022 the production company behind RuPaul's Drag Race, announced that a Belgian adaptation of the show, specifically from the French-speaking area of Wallonia, was in the works. On the same day, it was announced via the shows official Instagram page, that casting for the first season was now open. Applications remained open for one week until closing on 8 May 2022.

In January 2023, Radio-télévision belge de la Communauté française (RTBF) revealed the first ten contestants for its first season. The first season of Drag Race Belgique began airing on 16 February 2023, on Tipik and Auvio in Belgium and on WOW Presents Plus internationally. The season ran for 8 episodes and concluded on 4 April 2023. Athena Sorgelikis and Susan made the final, and Drag Couenne was the winner of the first season.

=== Season 2 (2024) ===
In May 2023, it was announced that Tipik renewed the series for a second season.
