= Iain James =

British singer

- Born: Iain James Farquharson; 20 February 1980 (age 46); Bristol, England
- Years active: 2003–present
- Formerly of: Triple 8

Iain James Farquharson (born 20 February 1980), more commonly known as Iain James or Sparx, is a British singer, songwriter and vocal producer from Bristol, but based in London. He started as part of the British boyband Triple 8 in 2003 as their lead singer and known as Sparx. He left after the group had two Top 10 hits and was replaced by Stewart Macintosh in 2005.

He has written a number of songs recorded by a great number of singing artists, plus writing many songs for reality television contestants from UK, Europe and Asia, and on three occasions for Eurovision Song Contest songs, including co-writing the winning song for Azerbaijan "Running Scared" by Ell & Nikki in 2011.

== Triple 8 ==
James was the lead singer of UK boy band Triple 8 (888), who were originally signed to Polydor Records. He was known by his nickname, "Sparx". The group had two successful singles, "Knockout" and "Give Me A Reason", which charted at numbers 8 and 9, respectively, in the UK Singles Chart. The group parted company with their record label in 2004, leaving their album, Heavy W8, unreleased. James left in 2004, to be replaced as lead singer in 2005 by a new member, Stewart Macintosh, before the group broke up by the end of 2005.

== Writing and production ==
After Triple 8, James concentrated on music writing and production. He has written for artists as diverse as Westlife, Professor Green, Emeli Sandé, Craig David, Taio Cruz, The Vamps, Anne-Marie, and Korean boyband TVXQ (aka Tohoshinki). He has also written for successful acts from reality television competitions, including Little Mix, One Direction, Olly Murs and Leona Lewis.

He co-wrote British number one "Read All About It" by Professor Green featuring Emeli Sandé, as well as Sandé's own version of the song which appears on her two million selling album Our Version of Events, which broke a record set by the Beatles for longest unimpeded spell in the UK top 10.

James wrote several songs on the album of Little Mix, the first ever British girlgroup whose album went straight into the top 5 in the US, including the UK Number 1 "Wings" and the critically lauded third place song "DNA".He wrote songs on their second album Salute, which did not match DNA commercially, but was a critical success, and followed its predecessor in charting in the UK top 5 and US top 10 (it would have repeated DNA's fourth placing if compilations were not included in the US albums chart). He wrote the album's song Little Me with Little Mix and TMS. For the group's third album Get Weird; Iain co-wrote the singles "Love Me Like You" and "Hair" feat. Sean Paul. The group's most successful album Glory Days features the single "Shout Out To My Ex", also co-written by James.

He is also a vocal producer and has recorded many artists including Little Mix, Ella Henderson, One Direction and Pixie Lott.

=== Eurovision ===
James co-wrote the Eurovision Song Contest 2011 winning song "Running Scared" by Ell & Nikki, who were the first male-female duo to win the song contest since 1963. They were also the first Azeris to win the contest, winning in Düsseldorf in May 2011.

James also co-wrote the Belgian entry at the Eurovision Song Contest 2013, "Love Kills" by Roberto Bellarosa, which placed 12th, and the British entry at the Eurovision Song Contest 2020, "My Last Breath" by James Newman.

== Discography ==
| Year | Title | Artist | Album | Credits |
|---|---|---|---|---|
| 2007 | Officially Yours | Craig David | Trust Me | Co-Writer |
| 2008 | You're My Idol | Donnie Klang | Just A Rolling Stone | Co-Writer |
| 2008 | Wrong Number | TVXQ | MIROTIC - The 4th Album | Co-Writer |
| 2010 | Did I? | Diagram Of The Heart | N/A | Co-Writer |
| 2011 | Build You A House | Timothy James | Make It Happen | Co-Writer |
| 2011 | The Sound Of Swing ft. Aloe Blacc | The Kenneth Bager Experience | The Sound Of... | Co-Writer |
| 2011 | Fell In Love With A Song | Blush | Make You Blush | Co-Writer |
| 2011 | Second Last Chance | The Overtones | Good Ol' Fashioned Love (Platinum Edition) | Co-Writer |
| 2011 | Running Scared | Ell & Nikki | N/A | Co-Writer |
| 2011 | Na Na Na | One Direction | Up All Night | Co-Writer |
| 2011 | Read All About It feat. Emeli Sandé | Professor Green | At Your Inconvenience | Co-Writer |
| 2011 | World In Our Hands | Taio Cruz | Ty.O | Co-Writer |
| 2011 | Hush Little Baby feat. Ed Sheeran | Wretch 32 | Black & White | Co-Writer |
| 2011 | Walking On Water | Matt Cardle | Letters | Co-Writer |
| 2012 | Wings | Little Mix | DNA | Co-Writer / Backing Vocals |
| 2012 | DNA | Little Mix | DNA | Co-Writer / Backing Vocals |
| 2012 | Going Nowhere | Little Mix | DNA | Co-Writer / Backing Vocals |
| 2012 | Make You Believe | Little Mix | DNA | Co-Writer / Backing Vocals |
| 2012 | Madhouse | Little Mix | DNA | Co-Writer / Backing Vocals |
| 2012 | Stereo Soldier | Little Mix | DNA | Co-Writer / Backing Vocals |
| 2012 | Always Be Together | Little Mix | DNA | Vocal Producer |
| 2012 | Read All About It (Part III) | Emeli Sandé | Our Version Of Events | Co-Writer |
| 2012 | Hand On Heart | Olly Murs | Right Place Right Time | Co-Writer |
| 2012 | Overtime feat. Ghetts | Clement Marfo & The Frontline | N/A | Co-Writer / Backing Vocals |
| 2012 | Champion | Clement Marfo & The Frontline | N/A | Co-Writer / Backing Vocals |
| 2012 | I Need You feat. Jagga | TMS | N/A | Co-Writer / Backing Vocals |
| 2013 | Heartless | A*M*E | N/A | Co-Writer |
| 2013 | Beethoven | Union J | Union J | Co-Writer / Backing Vocals |
| 2013 | Stereotype | Samsaya | Bombay Calling | Co-Writer |
| 2013 | Summer Rain | Chris Medina | What Are Words | Co-Writer |
| 2013 | Little Me | Little Mix | Salute | Co-Writer / Backing Vocals |
| 2013 | Competition | Little Mix | Salute | Co-Writer / Backing Vocals |
| 2013 | A Different Beat | Little Mix | Salute | Co-Writer / Backing Vocals |
| 2013 | See Me Now | Little Mix | Salute | Co-Writer / Backing Vocals |
| 2013 | They Just Don't Know You | Little Mix | Salute | Co-Writer / Backing Vocals |
| 2013 | Mr Loverboy | Little Mix | Salute | Vocal Producer |
| 2013 | Love Kills | Roberto Bellarosa | Ma Voie | Co-Writer |
| 2013 | Just The Way You Love Me | Shane Filan | You & Me | Co-Writer |
| 2013 | One More Sleep | Leona Lewis | Christmas, With Love | Co-Writer |
| 2013 | Going Under | Michael Paynter | Weary Love | Co-Writer |
| 2014 | Nothing Without You | Olly Murs | Never Been Better | Co-Writer |
| 2014 | The First Time | Ella Henderson | Chapter One | Vocal Producer |
| 2014 | Give Your Heart Away | Ella Henderson | Chapter One | Vocal Producer |
| 2015 | Left Out | LEGEND | N/A | Co-Writer |
| 2015 | She Ain't Me | Sinead Harnett | N/A | Co-Writer |
| 2015 | Cry For Help | HomeTown | HomeTown | Co-Writer |
| 2015 | Me 4 U | OMI | Me 4 U | Co-Writer |
| 2015 | Trouble | Major Myjah | Trouble | Co-Writer |
| 2015 | Start Again | Ben Haenow | Ben Haenow | Co-Writer |
| 2015 | Breakfast | Fleur East | Love, Sax and Flashbacks | Co-Writer |
| 2015 | Love Me Like You | Little Mix | Get Weird | Co-Writer |
| 2015 | The Fall | Markus Feehily | Fire | Co-Writer / Backing Vocals |
| 2016 | Gets No Better (2.0) feat. Serayah | Empire Cast | Empire: Original Soundtrack Season 2 | Co-Writer |
| 2016 | Hair feat. Sean Paul | Little Mix | Get Weird | Co-Writer |
| 2016 | Shout Out To My Ex | Little Mix | Glory Days | Co-Writer |
| 2016 | Beep Beep | Little Mix | Glory Days | Co-Writer / Backing Vocals |
| 2016 | Good Things Come To Those Who Wait | Nathan Sykes | Unfinished Business | Co-Writer / Backing Vocals |
| 2016 | Hurt Anymore | Samantha Jade & Cyrus | TBA | Co-Writer |
| 2017 | Unpredictable | Olly Murs & Louisa Johnson | 24 HRS | Co-Writer / Backing Vocals |
| 2017 | Giants | Lights | Skin & Earth | Co-Writer |
| 2017 | Heavy | Anne-Marie | Speak Your Mind | Co-Writer |
| 2017 | The Thing About Love | Matt Terry | Trouble | Co-Writer / Backing Vocals |
| 2018 | Start Over Again | New Hope Club | Non Album Single | Co-Writer |
| 2018 | Monday Blues | Exo-CBX | Blooming Days | Co-Writer |
| 2018 | Just My Type | The Vamps | Night & Day (Day Edition) | Co-Writer / Backing Vocals |
| 2018 | Friends | Why Don't We | 8 Letters | Co-Writer / Backing Vocals |
| 2018 | Take Your Love | Olly Murs | You Know I Know | Co-Writer |
| 2018 | 여기 있을게 (Smile On My Face) | Exo | Don't Mess Up My Tempo | Co-Writer |
| 2019 | Girl | Rak-Su | - | Co-Writer |
| 2019 | Pablo | Big Heath | - | Co-Writer |
| 2020 | Small Talk | Louise | Heavy Love | Co-Writer |
| 2020 | Give You Up | Louise | Heavy Love | Co-Writer / Backing Vocals |
| 2020 | Father's Son | Declan J Donovan | Homesick | Co-Writer |
| 2020 | Habit | Louis Tomlinson | Walls | Co-Writer |
| 2020 | Vibe | Mullally | Non Album Single | Co-Writer |
| 2020 | My Last Breath | James Newman | The Things We Do | Co-Writer / Backing Vocals |
| 2020 | Look What We've Done | New Rules | Non Album Single | Co-Writer |
| 2020 | MY FACE | VERIVERY | FACE US | Co-Writer |
| 2020 | After The Night Before | Molly Hocking | TBA | Co-Writer |
| 2020 | Christmas Prayer | Paloma Faith & Gregory Porter | Infinite Things | Co-Writer |
| 2021 | Feels Like Love | Syn Cole ft. MIYA MIYA | Non Album Single | Co-Writer |
| 2021 | Vibe | Matt Hunter | Non Album Single | Co-Writer |
| 2021 | Superstar | SHINee | Non Album Single | Co-Writer |
| 2021 | Can't Stop Writing Songs About You | Kylie Minogue and Gloria Gaynor | Disco: Guest List Edition | Co-Writer |
| 2021 | Kiss Me It's Christmas | Leona Lewis & Ne-Yo | Christmas, With Love Always | Co-Writer |
| 2021 | Day One | JLS | 2.0 | Co-Writer / Vocal Producer / Backing Vocals |
| 2021 | Tango | JLS | 2.0 | Co-Writer / Vocal Producer / Backing Vocals |
| 2021 | Postcard | JLS | 2.0 | Vocal Producer |
| 2021 | Priceless | JLS | 2.0 | Vocal Producer |
| 2021 | Changed | JLS | 2.0 | Vocal Producer |
| 2021 | Audition | JLS | 2.0 | Vocal Producer |
| 2021 | Love Immortal | JLS | 2.0 | Vocal Producer |
| 2021 | Glow | JLS | 2.0 | Vocal Producer |
| 2021 | Nothing Without U | JLS | 2.0 | Vocal Producer |
| 2021 | Secrets | Monsta X | The Dreaming | Co-Writer |
| 2021 | Woman | Leigh-Anne Pinnock | Boxing Day (Soundtrack) | Co-Writer |
| 2022 | Happy | Josef Salvat | Islands | Co-Writer |
| 2022 | 1, 2, 7 (Time Stops) | NCT 127 | 2 Baddies - The 4th Album | Co-Writer |
| 2022 | Pasta | New Rules | Go The Distance | Co-Writer |
| 2022 | Seat At The Table | The Vamps | Non Album Single | Co-Writer |
| 2022 | Love Me Hard | Sugababes | The Lost Tapes | Co-Writer |
| 2022 | No Regrets | Sugababes | The Lost Tapes | Co-Writer |
| 2022 | I'm Alright | Sugababes | The Lost Tapes | Co-Writer |
| 2023 | Single | Lou Elliotte | TBA | Co-Writer |
| 2023 | Put Your Hands Up | Marvin Humes | Non Album Single | Co-Writer |
| 2023 | The Birds | Bank & Ranx feat. Zach Zoya | Non Album Single | Co-Writer |
| 2023 | I Am | Now United | The Musical: Welcome To The Night Of Your Life | Co-Writer |
| 2023 | When The Rain Comes | Sugababes | TBA | Co-Writer |
| 2023 | Can't Say Goodbye | KEY | Good & Great - The 2nd Mini Album | Co-Writer |
| 2024 | Downtime | Tyler Lewis | wait 'til she gets her heart broken | Co-Writer |
| 2025 | Happy Tears | Isaak | Non Album Single | Co-Writer |
| 2025 | Heartbreak | Fifty Fifty | Day & Night | Co-Writer |
| 2025 | Take My Half | Tomorrow x Together | The Star Chapter: Together | Co-Writer |
| 2025 | Options | TWICE | THIS IS FOR | Co-Writer |
| 2025 | Feel It Again | MEDUN | Non Album Single | Co-Writer |
| 2025 | Heartbeat | Perrie | Perrie | Co-Writer |
| 2025 | Adolescence | idntt | <unevermet> | Co-Writer |
| 2025 | Knees Up | Olly Murs | Knees Up | Co-Writer |
| 2025 | Honest | Olly Murs | Knees Up | Co-Writer |
| 2025 | Still Getting Used (To The Ring) | Olly Murs | Knees Up | Co-Writer |
| 2026 | A OK | Myle | TBA | Co-Writer |

=== With Triple 8 ===
| Year | Single | Chart positions |
| Year | Single | UK |
|---|---|---|
| 2003 | "Knockout" | 8 |
| 2003 | "Give Me a Reason" | 9 |
