= Triple 8 =

British boy band

- Origin: England
- Genres: Pop
- Years active: 2001–2005
- Past members: David Wilcox; Iain James; Jamie Bell; Josh Barnett; Justin Scott; Stewart Macintosh

Triple 8 (a.k.a. 888 or Triple Eight) was an English boy band signed to Polydor Records and Osmosis UK Records. The group was marketed as the British equivalent of NSYNC, and rivals to manufactured boy bands such as Five, Westlife and A1.

The group had two consecutive Top 10 singles, "Knockout" and "Give Me a Reason", which charted at number 8 and 9 respectively in the UK Singles Chart. Despite moderate chart success, Polydor chose to drop the band in early 2004, leaving their already recorded debut album, Heavy W8, unreleased. In 2004, they reformed with new member Stewart Macintosh, and released a third single, "Good 2 Go", which reached number 2 in the UK Indie chart. Macintosh replaced Iain James Farquharson.

== Members ==
The group was originally made up of:

- David Wilcox: 2001–2003
- Iain James Farquharson, a.k.a. Sparx: 2001–2004
- Jamie Bell: 2001–2005
- Josh Barnett: 2001–2005
- Justin Scott: 2001–2005

New members

Iain James Farquharson left the band in 2004 and was replaced by:

- Stewart Macintosh: 2004–2005

== After break-up ==
After Triple 8, Iain James Farquharson, now known as Iain James, subsequently worked with many of the UK's major pop/R&B acts, such as Emeli Sandé, Little Mix and One Direction. He also co-wrote "Running Scared" by Eldar & Nigar. In 2013, he co-penned "Love Kills", which was performed by Roberto Bellarosa, The Belgian Voice winner, in 2013 representing Belgium. It qualified for the Eurovision Song Contest 2013 final placing 12th in Malmö. He is married to Liberty X singer Kelli Young.

Justin Scott is now a property developer, and married to Girls Aloud singer Kimberley Walsh.

Jamie Bell is now a highly qualified football coach. He worked at the David Beckham Academy, London in 2007, before taking a role in the US in 2010. He is now a director at a large youth soccer club in the US.

Joshua Barnett works in digital marketing in the UK.

Stewart Macintosh (now known as Stewart Mac) continues to write and perform his own material as an independent artist.

== Discography ==
=== Albums ===
Year	Album	UK
2003	Heavyw8	cancelled

=== Singles ===
Year	Single	Chart positions
Year	Single	UK
2003	"Knockout"	8
2003	"Give Me a Reason"	9
2005	"Good 2 Go"	2 indie chart
