= Quentin Mosimann =

Swiss DJ and music producer (born 1988)

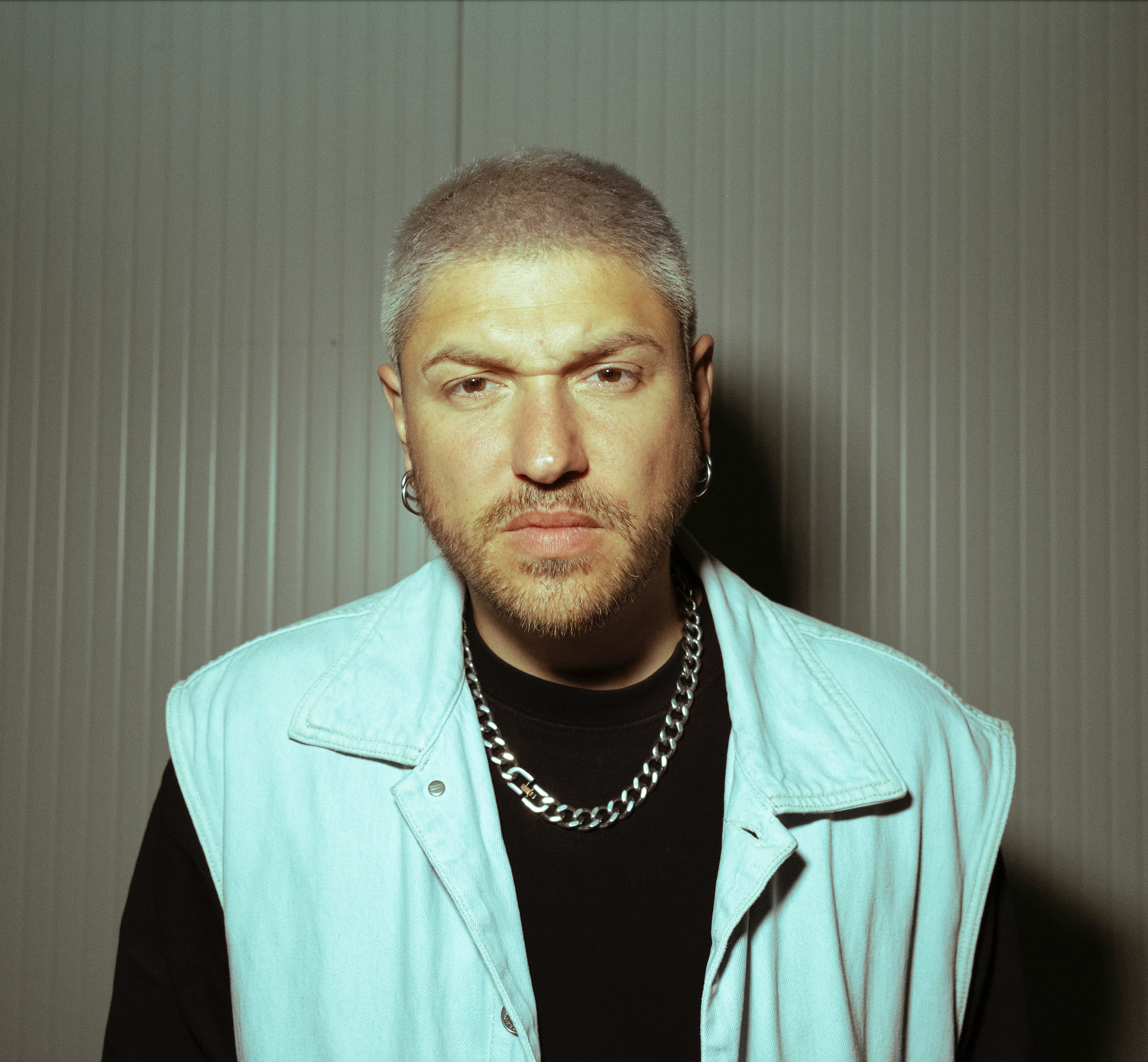
- Quentin Mosimann in 2024

Background information
- Born: Quentin Gérard John Mosimann; 14 February 1988 (age 38); Geneva, Switzerland
- Origin: Switzerland, France
- Genres: House, electro house, dance-pop, EDM
- Occupations: Singer, disc jockey, record producer, remixer
- Years active: 2007–present
- Labels: QMP, USM Universal DJ/Universal, DJ Center Records, Change Your Mind, Armada - Zouk Recordings, Big Fish Recordings, Run DBN

Quentin Gérard John Mosimann (French pronunciation: [kɑ̃tɛ̃ ʒeʁaʁ dʒɔn mɔziman]; born 14 February 1988 in Geneva) is a French-Swiss singer, DJ and record producer. He has been ranked in the top 100 of the best disc jockeys for four consecutive years by DJ Mag, ranking 93rd in 2015.

Quentin Mosimann began his DJ career in the south of France, in Saint-Tropez, when he was only 14. In 2008, he won the seventh season of the reality TV show Star Academy on TF1. He then gained success with his first two albums: Duel (2008) and Exhibition (2010) and a tour featuring a show at the Olympia of Paris. This paved the way for his international career as a "DJ-singer".

In 2026, he became the director of season 14 of Star Academy.

== Biography ==
Mosimann was born in Geneva on 14 February 1988, to a Swiss father (a native of Bern in German-speaking Switzerland) and a French mother. He has dual nationality. He lived in Geneva for three years, then, following the separation of his parents, moved to Bogève, Haute-Savoie, with his mother. He moved to Hyères, Var, near Saint-Tropez in 2005 where he performed, under the pseudonym John Louly, as a DJ at the NJoy club with John Revox and Christian Sims.

=== Early life ===
Mosimann has an older sister named Jennifer. Following their parents' separation, she moved to Switzerland to live with their father, while he remained with their mother in Haute-Savoie in France. Him and his mother and lived in modest financial circumstances, as he later recalled. His mother had accumulated approximately €42,000 in debt, which he repaid using part of his winnings from Star Academy.

=== Family life ===
In June 2026, Mosimann revealed in his column on France Inter that he had been the father of a daughter named Hayden born in 2024. He had his daughter with his best friend and manager, Maud Brooke. According to his account, he had initially been intended to act solely as the child's biological father.

== Career ==
=== 2007–09: Star Academy ===
Mosimann won the Star Academy on 15 February 2008. He earned 1,000,000 euros, 200,000 of them immediately available. On 18 August 2008 he released his debut album, Duel, a double album, which was No. 2 in France and No. 1 in Belgium (Wallonia). It contains many cover versions of 1980s hits, such as "C'est l'amour", by Léopold Nord & Vous, "Mise au point" by Jakie Quartz and "Étienne" by Guesch Patti.

=== 2010–11: Exhibition ===
On 15 February 2010 he released his second album "Exhibition", a pop-electro album which was No. 7 in France, No. 5 in Belgium (Wallonia) and No. 36 in Switzerland. His DJ career took an international dimension in 2010. Since, he has been performing in prestigious clubs around the world, in Europe, the US, Russia, China, Thailand, Polynesia, Indonesia, Israel, Egypt, Korea, Philippines, Morocco, Mozambique, Kazakhstan, Ukraine, Taiwan and many other countries.

=== 2012: The Voice Belgium ===
In 2012, in addition to his career as a DJ, he was a judge on The Voice Belgium with Tara McDonald acting as his assistant coach. He collaborated with the contestant he was coaching, Roberto Bellarosa, (who eventually became the winner of The Voice Belgium), on the realization of his first album, 'Ma voie'. On 19 October 2012, he was ranked 74th of the TOP100 ranking British magazine DJ Mag, and became the fifth French best DJ ahead Bob Sinclar or Justice. He won 100 places in the ranking in a year.

=== 2013: Psyké Underground ===
In 2013, the theme park Walibi Belgium asked him to make the single "Psyké Underground", which became the theme song for their latest roller coaster, also called Psyké Underground. On January 5, 2024, the attraction closed for a re-theming to integrate into the new "Walibi Docker World" universe under the name Turbine. This marks the end of Quentin's musical signature for this coaster. In September 2013, he became the main weekly resident DJ on the famous French EDM radio Fun Radio. He became the World's No. 69 DJ based on DJ Magazine's annual Top 100 DJs poll in October 2013, fourth French best DJ in the world, and he released his 3rd album 'The 8 Deadly Sins' in DJ Center Records, electro and progressive-house.

=== 2014: Décibels on Stage ===
In January 2014, his Party Fun show on air on Fun Radio was ranked No. 1 with 638,000 listeners (an increase of 178,000 listeners 39% in one year) In October 2014, for the third year consecutively, Quentin Mosimann is ranked by the DJ Magazine's annual Top 100 DJs poll. He is currently, ranked #72 worldwide and 4th best French DJ. Since October 2014 he is presenter of the musical TV show Décibels on Stage on channel La Deux, from the Belgian Radio-Television Group (RTBF) public television.

=== 2015: What I Did For Love ===
In January 2015, he released his official remix of "What I Did For Love" (David Guetta - ft. Emeli Sande). In April 2015, he released his official remix of "Feel the Vibe" (Sinclar - ft. Dawn Tallman). In August 2015, he signed for a new season as a judge on The Voice Belgium TV show. On 29 August 2015, after two years of weekly show on Party Fun, he decreases to a show a month in order to satisfy his audience in live without sacrificing his international career that keeps on growing. On 15 June 2015 the release of 'Jetlag' on the label Change Your Mind Records was executed. On 26 June 2015, the release of Igor Blaska feat Yvan Franel - 'City Of Love' (Quentin Mosimann Remix) was executed. On 10 December 2015, the release of Rollon - Run Away (Quentin Mosimann Remix) was executed.

=== 2016: Releases ===
On 28 March 2016 'I'm Leaving', in collaboration with Tom Swoon & Ilang on the label Armada / Zouk Recordings, was released. On 15 April 2016, the release of 'TI89' on the label Run DBN was executed. On 16 May 2016, the release of 'Somebody call the cops' in collaboration with DJs From Mars on the label Big Fish was executed. In March 2016, he was elected Best DJ Performer of 2015 by DJ Mag before David Guetta & DJ Snake. In June 2016, release of 'The Gifted One' in collaboration with Uhre on the label GL Music was executed. In July 2016, release of 'GOOF' on the label Big & Dirty was executed.

=== 2017: More releases ===
In February 2017, release of 'Never Let You Go' on the label Warner/Parlophone was executed.

=== 2026: Back to Star Academy ===
In 2026, he became the director of season 14 of the French Star Academy.

== Discography ==
=== Studio albums ===
Year	Title	Peak chart positions			
Year	Title	FR	FR TL	BEL/Fr	SWI
2008	Duel	2	2	1	15
2010	Exhibition	7	4	5	36
2013	The 8 Deadly Sins	—	41	—	—

=== Official remixes ===
- City Of Love - Igor Blaska feat Yvan Franel
- Feel the vibe - Bob Sinclar - ft. Dawn Tallman
- What I Did For Love - David Guetta feat. Emili Sandé
- Back 2 Paradise – Guéna LG & Amir Afargan feat. Sophie Ellis-Bextor
- Wildfire – Julian Perretta
- Leh Leh Leh – Igor Blaska & Vkee Madison
- Alright – Mark Knight feat. Sway
- Nevert Say Kukatu (Hardwell & Dyro vs Ivan Gough & Jebu)
- SOS (Ocean Drive)
- Fix of you (Tara McDonald)
- Timeless (Vince M)
- Summer All Over (Chris Kaeser feat. Ron Carroll)
- Love Again (Laurent Wolf)
- Si Mes Larmes Tombent (Christophe Willem)
- Ma'ak Bartaah (Amr Dian)
- Psychopath (Fred Pellichero)
- On Les Aime (Gary Fico)
- Dance (Sir Colin)
- Love at First Sight (Jay Style feat. John Louly)
- Acid Killer (Christian Sims)
- Respect (RLP feat. Barbara Tucker)
- Be My Candy (Téo Moss)
- Do You St-Tropez? (Quentin Mosimann cover)
- Mario vs Angello (Ricksick)
- I Love U (David Vendetta)
- Over You (Mehrbod)
- I Wanna Take You Away (Ben DJ)
- Electrochoc (Samomike)
- The Orange Theme (Hatiras)
- Crazy (Eva Pearl feat. Humphrey)
- Starlove (Christian Sims)
- Shame on You (Valentin Florian)
- Superstar (JC Magnetic)
- Take A Look (Julien Créance)
- Feel Alone (Alan Pride & Jeremy Kalls)
- Gimme A Break (Quentin Mosimann)
- Get Up (Alexis Dante & Sicky feat. Eva Menson)
- Big Orgus (DJ Furax)
- Love Is The Solution (Alexandre Billard)
- My Love Is Over (Jean-Roch)
- Le Cirque (Chris Garcia)
- I Want Your Sex (George Michael)

=== Vocal covers ===
- Melody - Oliver Heldens
- Back in Time – Don Diablo
- Payback – Dimitri Vangelis & Wyman X Steve Angello
- Drunk – Kitsch 2.0 & Ken Roll
- Get loose – Showtek & Noisecontrollers (Tiesto remix)
- Hook – Joachim Garraud & Alesia
- Heart Upon my Sleeve – Avicii
- Hell Yeah – Tiesto & Showtek
- Lrad – Knife Party
- Eagles – Sander Van Doorn & Adrian Lux

=== Involvement ===
- 2007 : Peace & Love 70 par Star Academy 7 (Bangladesh)
- 2009 : Scratch Da House Showbizz en collaboration avec Sir Colin
- 2012 : Ma voie par Roberto Bellarosa
- 2012 : Je reprends ma route – charity in favor of the organisation: Les voix de l'enfant

==== Singles ====
As John Louly (before 2007):

- "Hot Vocation" (Hot Vocation)
- "Tears" (Hot Vocation)
- "Holiday" (Hot Vocation)
- "My Answer" (Hot Vocation) – jamais sorti
- "Stop in My Mind" (Hot Vocation) – jamais sorti
- "Love at First Sight" (Jay Style feat. John Louly) – album Dancefloor Selection by Jay Style

As Quentin Mosimann (after 2007):

Year	Single	Ranking					Album
Year	Single	FR	FR DL	BEL (WA)	SWI	EUR	Album
2008	"Cherchez le garçon"	4	1	4	78	37	Duel
2008	"Il y a je t'aime et je t'aime"	2	18	23	—	10	Duel
2009	"Toc toc"	—	12	25	—	—	Exhibition
2011	"All Alone (Est-ce qu'un jour)" (featuring Sheryfa Luna)	36	33	35	—	—	Non-album singles
2011	"Do You Saint-Tropez"	—	—	35	—	—	Non-album singles
2011	"Watch Your Back"	—	—	37	—	—	Non-album singles
2011	"All Alone" (featuring Tara McDonald)	—	—	—	—	—	Non-album singles
2012	"Je suis DJ / Fuckin' DJ"	82	—	—	—	—	Non-album singles
2012	"Haters"	—	—	—	—	—	Non-album singles
2012	"Boing"	—	—	—	—	—	Non-album singles
2013	"Psyké Underground"	—	—	20	—	—	The 8 Deadly Sins
2013	"Hello"	—	—	34	—	—	The 8 Deadly Sins
2013	"I Drum U"	—	—	—	—	—	Non-album singles
2013	"Mr Boogie"	—	—	—	—	—	Non-album singles
2013	"Pogo Pogo"	—	—	—	—	—	Non-album singles
2014	"Dracarys"	40	—	6	—	—	Non-album singles
2014	"Tumf"	28	—	—	—	—	Non-album singles
2014	"International" (with John Revox)	—	—	—	—	—	Non-album singles
2014	"Intensa" (with Pete Tha Zouk)	—	—	—	—	—	Non-album singles
2015	"Happy Ending"	—	—	—	—	—	Non-album singles
2015	"Back to the Groove"	—	—	—	—	—	Non-album singles
2015	"Swear Jar"	—	—	—	—	—	Non-album singles
2015	"Red Sole"	—	—	—	—	—	Non-album singles
2015	"Jet Lag"	—	—	—	—	—	Non-album singles
2016	"I'm Leaving" (with Tom Swoon featuring Ilang)	—	—	—	—	—	Non-album singles
2016	"TI89"	—	—	—	—	—	Non-album singles
2016	"Somebody Call the Cops" (Mosimann & DJs From Mars)	—	—	—	—	—	Non-album singles
2016	"The Gifted One" (with Uhre; GL Music)	—	—	—	—	—	Non-album singles
2016	"GOOF" (Big & Dirty)	—	—	—	—	—	Non-album singles
2017	"Never Let You Go" (featuring Joe Cleere; Warner/Parlophone)	79	—	—	—	—	Non-album singles
2019	"I Need"	—	—	—	—	—	Non-album singles
"—" denotes a recording that did not chart or was not released in that territory.

=== Podcasts ===
Every month, Quentin Mosimann publishes free podcasts on iTunes : House Bless You By Mosimann, his mixes (Progressive-House sound/ EDM) are also available on Fun Radio.
