= Jealous Guy =

1971 song by John Lennon

- US picture sleeve

Single by John Lennon

from the album Imagine
- B-side: "Going Down on Love" (UK); "Give Peace a Chance" (US)
- Released: 9 September 1971 (album); 18 November 1985 (single)
- Recorded: 24 May – 5 July 1971
- Length: 4:14
- Label: Apple
- Songwriter: John Lennon
- Producers: John Lennon; Yoko Ono; Phil Spector

John Lennon singles chronology
"Every Man Has a Woman Who Loves Him" (1984)	"Jealous Guy" (1971)

Alternative cover
- 1985 UK picture sleeve

Official audio
- "Jealous Guy" (Elements Mix) on YouTube

"Jealous Guy" is a song written and originally recorded by the English rock musician John Lennon from his second studio album Imagine (1971). Not released as a single during Lennon's lifetime, it became an international hit in a version by Roxy Music issued in early 1981; this version reached number one in the United Kingdom and Australia and was a top-10 hit in several European countries. Lennon's own version was subsequently issued as a single and charted in the United States and UK.

Lennon began writing the song in 1968, when, as "Child of Nature", it was among the many songs demoed by the Beatles before they recorded their self-titled double album (also known as the "White Album"). The lyrics were originally inspired by a lecture given by Maharishi Mahesh Yogi in early 1968, when the Beatles attended his spiritual retreat in Rishikesh, India. In January 1969, the Beatles (primarily Lennon) jammed the song during their Get Back / Let It Be recording sessions, where it was referred to as "On the Road to Marrakesh".

== Origins ==
The song's inspiration came in India, after the Beatles attended a lecture by Maharishi Mahesh Yogi about a "son of the mother nature". This inspired both Paul McCartney and John Lennon to write songs about the same subject. McCartney's composition, "Mother Nature's Son", was selected for The Beatles, but Lennon did not attempt to record "Child of Nature" during the sessions for the album. Both were demoed at George Harrison's Esher home in May 1968. The demo of "Child of Nature" featured Lennon's double-tracked vocal and playing an acoustic guitar. Early the following year, Lennon revisited the song as "On the Road to Marrakesh" during the Get Back sessions. Eventually, the lyrics were scrapped and replaced by the "Jealous Guy" lyrics for Imagine.

Listening to the original Esher Demo, the song begins "On the road to Rishikesh" and mentions mountains. It is not referring to Marrakesh in Morocco, and there is no evidence Lennon ever visited there. In its rewritten form, the song serves as a confessional in which Lennon addresses the feelings of inadequacy that resulted in pain for those he loved.

Three recordings of "Child of Nature" are currently known. The first is a demo of the song recorded at the home of George Harrison in May 1968. The second, on which Harrison sings backing vocals, was recorded at Twickenham Film Studios on 2 January 1969. A third recording was made at the Beatles' Apple Studio on 24 January. A snatch of the chorus from the second recording appears on the Fly on the Wall bonus disc packaged with Let It Be... Naked (2003). The first recording appears on the fiftieth anniversary release of The Beatles, which contains all of the demos recorded at Esher.

== Recording ==
Lennon recorded "Jealous Guy" on 24 May 1971 at Ascot Sound Studios, where his vocals were overdubbed on 29 May 1971. String overdubs took place on 4 July 1971 at the Record Plant, in New York City. Musicians included Mike Pinder of the Moody Blues and Joey Molland and Tom Evans of Badfinger.

Nicky Hopkins plays the distinctive piano part that runs through the song. His performance drew praise from those attending the sessions, including Yoko Ono.

== Release ==
Lennon's recording of "Jealous Guy" was released on the Imagine album in 1971. It was not released as a single until November 1985, five years after Lennon's murder and four-and-a-half years after Roxy Music's version was released. Accompanied on the B-side by "Going Down on Love", a track from Walls and Bridges (1974), the single reached number 65 on the UK charts.

In the United States, the single reached number 80 on the Billboard Hot 100 in November 1988 in conjunction with the release of the documentary film Imagine: John Lennon. "Jealous Guy" also peaked at number 22 on the Hot Adult Contemporary chart.

== Critical reception ==
Stereogum contributors Timothy and Elizabeth Bracy rated it as Lennon's second best solo song behind "Instant Karma!", saying that "we have Lennon at his most wounded and vulnerable, confessing to every manner of emotional extortion, and somehow still on the defensive" in a song with "a melody worthy of anything the Beatles ever produced."

Ultimate Classic Rock critic Stephen Lewis rated it as Lennon's third greatest solo love song, calling it "one of his most mature piano melodies."

== Promotional video ==
A promotional video was made for the song in 1971. It showed, mostly in a continuous overhead shot by helicopter, John and Yoko travelling in a hearse from their Tittenhurst Park mansion to a nearby lake, where they were then shown getting into a rowing boat.

== Personnel ==
The following musicians performed on the final track on Imagine:

- John Lennon – vocals, acoustic guitar, whistling
- Nicky Hopkins – piano
- John Barham – harmonium
- Alan White – vibraphone
- Klaus Voormann – bass
- Jim Keltner – drums
- Mike Pinder – tambourine
- Joey Molland and Tom Evans – acoustic guitars
- The Flux Fiddlers – strings

== Certifications ==
Region	Certification	Certified units/sales
New Zealand (RMNZ)	Gold	15,000^{‡}
United Kingdom (BPI) 2011 release	Silver	200,000^{‡}
^{‡} Sales+streaming figures based on certification alone.

== Other versions ==
"Jealous Guy" has been recorded by many musicians including Aslan, Joe Cocker, Roberto Bellarosa, Donny Hathaway, Claudine Longet, the Faces, Frankie Miller, Roxy Music, Belinda Carlisle, Hurray for the Riff Raff, Peter Criss, Elliott Smith, Deftones, Spector, Yoko Miwa and the Weeknd. Lou Reed covered the song for a 2001 Lennon tribute concert. Jazz musician Jimmy Scott covered "Jealous Guy" on his 1998 album Holding Back the Years. The rock band the Black Crowes released a live cover of "Jealous Guy" on the 30th anniversary release of their debut studio album Shake Your Money Maker (1990). Queen drummer Roger Taylor covered "Jealous Guy" on his 2026 album Violence Insane in a Beautiful World.

=== Roxy Music version ===
"Jealous Guy"

Single by Roxy Music
- B-side: "To Turn You On"
- Released: 13 February 1981
- Length: 6:10; 4:57 (edit)
- Label: Polydor; E.G.
- Songwriter: John Lennon
- Producers: Bryan Ferry; Rhett Davies

Roxy Music singles chronology
"In the Midnight Hour" (1980)	"Jealous Guy" (1981)	"More Than This" (1982)

Official video
- "Jealous Guy" on YouTube

Following Lennon's murder in 1980, Roxy Music added a version of the song to their set while touring in Germany, which they recorded and released in February 1981. The single was released by Polydor with "To Turn You On" as the B-side, with catalogue number "ROXY 2". The song was the only UK number-one hit for Roxy Music, topping the UK Singles Chart for two weeks in March 1981. "To Turn You On" later appeared on their eighth studio album Avalon (1982), although it was slightly remixed. Roxy Music's cover of "Jealous Guy" features on many Bryan Ferry/Roxy Music collections and 1980s music compilations, though not always in its full-length version. As of 1982, the single had sold 91,000 copies in Australia.

==== Music video ====
A music video was filmed for the song, which mainly consisted of Bryan Ferry singing to camera before whistling and playing on a Sequential Circuits Prophet-5 synthesizer during the coda. Guitarist Phil Manzanera and saxophonist Andy Mackay also appear in the video during their respective solos.

==== Charts ====
===== Weekly charts =====
Chart (1981)	Peak position
Australia (Kent Music Report)	1
Austria (Ö3 Austria Top 40)	6
Belgium (Ultratop 50 Flanders)	5
Ireland (IRMA)	3
Luxembourg (Radio Luxembourg)	1
Netherlands (Dutch Top 40)	7
Netherlands (Single Top 100)	10
New Zealand (Recorded Music NZ)	4
Norway (VG-lista)	6
South Africa (Springbok Radio)	3
Sweden (Sverigetopplistan)	18
Switzerland (Schweizer Hitparade)	4
UK Singles (Official Charts)	1
West Germany (GfK)	19

Chart (1988)	Peak position
US Billboard Hot 100	80
US Adult Contemporary (Billboard)	22
US Cash Box Top 100	64

===== Year-end charts =====
Chart (1981)	Position
Australian (Kent Music Report)	4
Belgium (Ultratop)	16
Netherlands (Dutch Top 40)	61
Netherlands (Single Top 100)	66
New Zealand (RIANZ)	29
UK Singles (OCC)	22
West Germany (Media Control)	73

=== Roberto Bellarosa version ===
"Jealous Guy"

Single by Roberto Bellarosa

from the album Ma voie
- Released: 4 April 2012
- Recorded: 2012
- Length: 2:50
- Label: 8ball Music; Sony Music Entertainment
- Songwriter: John Lennon

Roberto Bellarosa singles chronology
"Jealous Guy" (2012)	"Je Crois" (2012)

In 2012, Belgian singer Roberto Bellarosa recorded "Jealous Guy" after winning the first season of The Voice Belgique. It was released as a single on 4 April 2012 and included on his debut studio album Ma voie. The single reached number four in Belgium.
