= Apprends-moi =

Apprends-moi may refer to:

- "Apprends-moi" (Roberto Bellarosa song), 2012
- Apprends-moi, a song by Sylvie Vartan, 1969
- Apprends-moi, a song by Ana Torroja, 2001
- Apprends-moi, a song by Celine Dion from her 2003 album, 1 fille & 4 types
- Apprends-moi, a song by Hélène Ségara, 2008
- Apprends-moi, a song by Superbus, 2009
- Apprends-moi, a song by Christian Delagrange, 2012
- Apprends-moi, a song by Fraissinet, 2017
