= Miracle (Super Junior song) =

Single by Super Junior 05

from the album Twins
- Released: February 12, 2006
- Recorded: 2005
- Studio: SM Blue Ocean (Seoul)
- Genre: Bubblegum pop; dance
- Length: 2:56
- Label: SM
- Composers: Daniel Pandher; Tommy La Verdi
- Lyricist: Yoon Hyo-sang
- Producer: Hwang Sung-jae

Super Junior 05 singles chronology
"Show Me Your Love" (2005)	"Miracle" (2006)	"U" (2006)

Music video
- "Miracle" on YouTube

"Miracle" is a song by South Korean boy group Super Junior (then branded as Super Junior 05) from their first studio album, Twins. It was released as the album's second single by SM Entertainment on February 12, 2006.

== Overview ==
"Miracle" was first made available as part of Super Junior 05's debut album Twins on December 5, 2005. The song became their second promotional single for the album after "Twins (Knock Out)", with the first performance of the track taking place on February 12, 2006, on SBS's Inkigayo. Promotional performances for the track began on February 14, 2006, soon following the release of the single's music video on February 24. "Miracle" is Super Junior's third performing single after "Twins (Knock Out)" and "Show Me Your Love."

It was also the second song produced by SM Entertainment that topped overseas music charts in Thailand of Channel V, the first being TVXQ's "Rising Sun." Promotional activities for "Miracle" continued well throughout March and April until the release of their first official single, "U" in May.

The music video for "Miracle" was filmed around Gangnam and in Samseong-dong, Seoul across three days, from February 9 to 11, 2008.

== Reception ==
The single topped Airplay charts and remained #1 for three consecutive weeks.

== Cover version ==
A Mandarin cover of "Miracle" was performed by Super Junior's Mandopop sub-unit, Super Junior-M, which was released in Super Junior-M's debut album, Me (2008). The dance break in the song is slightly remixed and a bass vocal is added to complement the main vocals of the song. The Chinese title is translated to "You Are My Miracle."

A remake version was performed by NCT Wish in 2025, which was released as the second single off the album 2025 SM Town: The Culture, the Future (2025), a commemorate album to SM Entertainment's 30th anniversary.

== Credits and personnel ==
Credits adapted from the album's liner notes, for both Super Junior's original version and NCT Wish's cover version.

=== Super Junior ===
Studio

- SM Blue Ocean Studio – recording
- SM Yellow Tail Studio – mixing
- Sonic Korea – mastering

Personnel

- SM Entertainment – executive producer
- Lee Soo-man – producer
- Super Junior – vocals
- Yoon Hyo-sang – lyrics
- Daniel Pandher – composition
- Tommy La Verdi – composition
- Hwang Sung-jae – producer, arrangement, recording
- Ko Tae-young – guitar
- Heo Jeong-hee a.k.a. KAT – recording
- Lee Seong-ho – mixing
- Jeon Hoon – mastering

=== NCT Wish ===
Studio

- SM LVYIN Studio – recording, digital editing, engineered for mix
- SM Blue Ocean Studio – mixing
- 821 Sound – mastering

Personnel

- SM Entertainment – executive producer
- NCT Wish – vocals
  - Yushi – background vocals
  - Jaehee – background vocals
- Yoon Hyo-sang – lyrics
- Daniel Pandher – composition
- Tommy La Verdi – composition
- Kenzie – producer, arrangement, vocal directing, background vocals
- Andrew Choi – background vocals
- Kim Yoo-hyun – guitar
- Lee Ji-hong – recording, digital editing, engineered for mix
- Kim Cheol-sun – mixing
- Kwon Nam-woo – mastering
