= Show Me Your Love (TVXQ and Super Junior song) =

Single by TVXQ & Super Junior 05
- B-side: "I Wanna Hold You" "I'm Your Man"
- Released: December 15, 2005
- Recorded: 2005
- Studio: Cool Sound (Seoul); SM Concert Hall (Seoul); SM Yellow Tail (Seoul); T (Seoul)
- Genre: Christmas; K-pop
- Length: 4:06
- Label: SM
- Composer: Kenzie
- Lyricists: Park Yoo-chun; Kim Hee-chul; Shindong; Eunhyuk; Kenzie
- Producers: Lee Soo-man; Kenzie

TVXQ Korean singles chronology
"Hi Ya Ya" (2005)	"Show Me Your Love" (2005)	"Fighting Spirit of the East" (2006)

Super Junior 05 singles chronology
"Twins (Knock Out)" (2005)	"Show Me Your Love" (2005)	"Miracle" (2006)

"Show Me Your Love" is a single by TVXQ and Super Junior 05, released via SM Entertainment on December 15, 2005. It was distributed as a CD single in both Korean and English, with the tracks "I Wanna Hold You" and "I'm Your Man" serving as B-sides.

== Music video ==
The music video for the song "Show Me Your Love" starts with TVXQ and Super Junior taking photos for a winter photoshoot. Super Junior becomes exhausted and they retire to their seats. TVXQ brings up their spirit by starting the song, saying that TVXQ now has a new family, Super Junior. The two groups sing together under snow, in chapels, on ships, and other similar places that are surrounded by Christmas spirits. Most of the filming took place in Lotte World.

== Reception ==
Commercially, "Show Me Your Love" peaked at number one on the MIAK album chart for December 2005 and sold 49,945 physical copies. It reentered the Gaon Album Chart five years later in February 2010 and attained a peak position of number 28.

== Track listing ==
All songs were written, composed and arranged by Kenzie, who also took as a co-producer for album. Yoochun, Heechul, Shindong and Eunhyuk took part in rap lyrics for the title track Show Me Your Love.

No.	Title	Lyrics	Music	Arrangement	Length
1.	"Show Me Your Love" (sung by TVXQ and Super Junior)	Yoochun; Heechul; Shindong; Eunhyuk; Kenzie	Kenzie	Kenzie	4:06
2.	"I Wanna Hold You" (sung by TVXQ)	Kenzie	Kenzie	Kenzie	4:14
3.	"I’m Your Man" (오늘만은; Oneulmaneun (sung by Super Junior))	Kenzie	Kenzie	Kenzie	3:44
4.	"Show Me Your Love (Instrumental)"		Kenzie	Kenzie	4:04
Total length:					16:08

== Credits and personnel ==
Credits are adapted from the liner notes of Show Me Your Love physical single:

Musicians

- TVXQ – vocal, background vocals (both for track 1 and 2)
  - Xiah Junsu
  - Micky Yoochun – rap lyrics (track 1)
  - Hero Jaejoong
  - Max Changmin
  - U-know Yunho
- Super Junior 05 – vocal, background vocals (both for track 1 and 3)
  - Leeteuk
  - Heechul – rap lyrics (track 1)
  - Han Geng
  - Yesung
  - Kang-in
  - Shindong – rap lyrics (track 1)
  - Sungmin
  - Eunhyuk – rap lyrics (track 1)
  - Donghae
  - Siwon
  - Ryeowook
  - Kibum

Additional musicians

- Kim Jung-bae – guitar (track 1, 3 and 4)
- Kang Su-ho – drum (track 2)
- Choi Won-hyun – bass (track 2)
- Song Young-joo – piano (track 2)
- Shim Sang-won – strings arrangement (track 2)
- K-Strings – strings (track 2)

Technical personnel

- SM Entertainment – executive producer
- Lee Soo-man – producer
- Kenzie – producer, lyrics (track 1, 2 and 3), composition, arrangement
- Lee Seong-ho – recording, mixing (both for track 1 and 2)
- Nam Koong-jin – recording, mixing (both for track 3)
- Kim Dong-hoon – strings recording (track 2)
- Park Dong-won – strings recording assistant (track 2)
- Kim Yong-seong – recording (track 1)
- Jeon Seung-hun – recording assistant (track 1)
- Jeon Hoon – mastering
- Kim Young-min – executive supervisor

Studios

- SM Yellow Tail Studio – recording, mixing (track 1 and 2)
- SM Concert Hall Studio – recording, mixing (track 3)
- T-Studio – recording (track 2)
- Cool Sound – recording (track 1)
- Sonic Korea – mastering

== Charts ==
=== Weekly charts ===
Chart (2010)	Peak position
South Korean Albums (Gaon)	28

=== Monthly charts ===
Chart (December 2005)	Peak position
South Korean Albums (MIAK)	1

=== Yearly charts ===
Chart (2005)	Peak position
South Korean Albums (RIAK)	35

== Sales ==
Country	Sales
South Korea (physical)	56,141
