= List of stage names: Q =

This list of stage names lists names used by those in the entertainment industry, alphabetically by their stage name's surname (or the best approximation) followed by the given name (or the best approximation) where the surname begins with "Q". One-word stage names are presented in List of one-word stage names.

Stage name	Birth name	Life	Notability	Notes
Maggie Q	Margaret Denise Quigley	1979–	American actress	
Stacey Q	Stacey Lynn Swain	1958–	American pop singer, songwriter, dancer and actress	
Rich Homie Quan	Dequantes Devontay Lamar	1989–	American rapper	
Nina Quartero	Gladys Quartararo	1908–1985	American actress	
Jakie Quartz	Jacqueline Cuchet	1955–	French singer	
Dimash Qudaibergen	Dinmukhammed Qanatuly Qudaibergen	1994–	Kazakh singer, songwriter and multi-instrumentalist	
Ivy Queen	Martha Ivelisse Pesante Rodríguez	1972–	Puerto Rican singer, rapper, songwriter and actress	
Freddy Quinn	Franz Eugen Helmut Manfred Nidl	1931–	Former Austrian singer and actor	
Louis Quinn	Louis Frackt	1915–1988	American actor	
