= Hot Stuff (Let's Dance) =

Single by Craig David

from the album Trust Me
- Released: 5 November 2007
- Recorded: Havana, Cuba
- Genre: Electro-R&B; dance; post-disco; funk
- Length: 3:39
- Label: Warner Bros.; Sire
- Songwriters: Craig David; David Bowie; Fraser T. Smith
- Producer: Fraser T. Smith

Craig David singles chronology
"This Is the Girl" (2006)	"Hot Stuff (Let's Dance)" (2007)	"6 of 1 Thing" (2008)

Music video
- "Hot Stuff (Let's Dance)" on YouTube

"Hot Stuff (Let's Dance)" is a song by British singer Craig David. It was written by David and Fraser T. Smith for his fourth studio album, Trust Me (2007), with production overseen by Smith. The song samples David Bowie's 1983 number-one single "Let's Dance". Due to the inclusion of the sample, Bowie is also credited as a songwriter. "Hot Stuff (Let's Dance)" was released in November 2007 as the second single from Trust Me, following the single "This Is the Girl" with rapper Kano. It became a top ten hit in Croatia, Denmark, Finland, Hungary, Sweden, and the United Kingdom, while reaching the top 40 on the majority of all other charts it appeared on.

== Chart performance ==
"Hot Stuff (Let's Dance)" debuted at number 19 in the UK Singles Chart. In its second week on the charts, it moved up to number 7. The song also broke into the Swedish Singles Chart, and peaked at number 10.

== Music video ==
A music video for "Hot Stuff (Let's Dance)" was directed by Justin Francis.

== Track listing ==
UK CD single
No.	Title	Writer(s)	Producer(s)	Length
1.	"Hot Stuff (Let's Dance)" (Album Version)	Craig David; David Bowie; Fraser T. Smith	Fraser T. Smith	3:39

International maxi-single
No.	Title	Writer(s)	Producer(s)	Length
1.	"Hot Stuff (Let's Dance)" (Radio Edit)	David; Bowie; Smith	Smith	3:39
2.	"Hot Stuff vs. World Hold On" (vs. Bob Sinclar)	David; Bowie; Smith; Christophe Le Friant; Steve Edwards; Michael Tordjman	Smith; Sinclar	3:23
3.	"Hot Stuff (Let's Dance)" (Dark Star Remix)	David; Bowie; Smith	Smith; David^{[a]}	4:34
4.	"Hot Stuff (Let's Dance)" (Touché Mix)	David; Bowie; Smith	Hill; Touché^{[a]}	5:46
5.	"Hot Stuff (Let's Dance)" (Video)

Notes

- ^{^[a]} signifies an additional producer

== Charts ==
=== Weekly charts ===
Weekly chart performance for "Hot Stuff (Let's Dance)"
Chart (2007–08)	Peak position
Australia (ARIA)	29
Austria (Ö3 Austria Top 40)	39
Belgium (Ultratop 50 Flanders)	14
Belgium (Ultratop 50 Wallonia)	15
Croatia (HRT)	2
Czech Republic Airplay (ČNS IFPI)	41
Denmark (Tracklisten)	9
Europe (Eurochart Hot 100)	17
Finland (Suomen virallinen lista)	3
France (SNEP)	15
Germany (GfK)	37
Hungary (Rádiós Top 40)	5
Ireland (IRMA)	19
Netherlands (Dutch Top 40)	37
Netherlands (Single Top 100)	47
Scotland Singles (OCC)	14
Sweden (Sverigetopplistan)	10
Switzerland (Schweizer Hitparade)	11
UK Singles (OCC)	7
UK Hip Hop/R&B (OCC)	4
US Dance Club Songs (Billboard)	22

=== Year-end charts ===
2007 year-end chart performance for "Hot Stuff (Let's Dance)"
Chart (2007)	Position
UK Singles (OCC)	108
UK Urban (Music Week)	27

2008 year-end chart performance for "Hot Stuff (Let's Dance)"
Chart (2008)	Position
Europe (Eurochart Hot 100)	99
Hungary (Rádiós Top 40)	32
