= C'est l'amour =

Single by Léopold Nord & Vous

from the album C'est l'amour
- B-side: "Instrumental"
- Released: September 1987
- Recorded: Belgium
- Genre: Pop
- Length: 3:24
- Label: Ariola, Carrere (1987); ARS Productions (1993)
- Songwriters: Alec Mansion; Benoît Mansion; Hubert Mansion
- Producer: Alec Mansion

Léopold Nord & Vous singles chronology
"C'est l'amour" (1987)	"Les Hippopotamtam" (1988)

Alternative cover
- 1993 remixes

"C'est l'amour" is a popular song recorded by Belgian band Léopold Nord & Vous. It was trio's debut single, released in September 1987, from the album of the same name, and perhaps remains to date its most known song, due to the huge success it met in France and the number of cover versions and remixes that it was the subject throughout the years. It can be deemed as band's signature song.

== Background and release ==
In 1987, Alec Mansion, a Belgian artist who had already released several singles in his country, recorded in Tony Visconti's studio in London a song he wrote in English, entitled "Don't Walk Away". However, no recording company agreed to sign a contract with him, because nobody thought that the song had potential. Mansion decided to re-record the song adding French voices to the English mix. He then re-wrote the lyrics in French along with his two brothers, Benoît and Hubert, and the song was re-entitled "C'est l'amour". The music video accompanying the song shows two of the singers in an elevator, dressed as baggage handlers and performing the song; the elevator goes up and down and welcomes various people, which gives rise to various situations.

"C'est l'amour" was eventually released in early September 1987. The cover art was made by Steve Sauvage who also designed the covers for Muriel Dacq's first two singles. It was re-issued in 1993 in remixed versions named "Unity Power mixes". In 2007 and 2008, the song was performed at the RFM Party 80 concert tour in which numerous artists of the 1980s, including Alec Mansion, participated.

== Critical reception ==
According to Elia Habib, an expert of French charts, "C'est l'amour" has "very nice sounds", a "humorous" tone and enjoys "good humor". The theme of love is here, ironically, used in all its facets. In the verses, after expressing an idea in the form of a question or an exclamation, the words "C'est l'amour" are chanted as being the cause of each idea previously mentioned. Two reviews from Music & Media described the song as a "repetitive and square pop ditty", and an "electro-funk with a dash of Latin rhythm and some sleezy low-key vocals [that] make this some of the most mature and original music to come out of Belgium for quite some time. The arrangement is highly disciplined, keeping the backing down to basics and allowing the semi-spoken vocals to set the atmosphere".

== Chart performance ==
In France, "C'est l'amour" entered at number 26 on the SNEP singles chart on 19 September 1987, climbing up almost every week thereafter and entering the top ten four weeks later; it peaked at number two twice, being unable to dislodge Los Lobos's big hit "La Bamba" which was at the top then. It totaled 14 weeks in the top ten and fell off the chart (top 50) after 24 weeks. It was certified Gold by the Syndicat National de l'Édition Phonographique. In addition, it charted in Belgium for five weeks on the Walloon chart, with a peak at number 24. On the European Hot 100 Singles chart, it debuted at number 49 on 3 October 1987 and reached a peak of number 20 in its 16th week and remained on the chart for 22 weeks.

== Cover versions ==
In 2008, Quentin Mosimann, the winner of Star Academy 7 in France, covered "C'est l'amour" on his debut album Duel and decided to release it as the second single from his album.

== Track listings ==
=== Original version ===
7" single

1. "C'est l'amour" — 3:25
2. "C'est l'amour" (instrumental) — 3:45

12" maxi

1. "C'est l'amour" (love remix) — 5:25
2. "C'est l'amour" (instrumental) — 3:21
3. "C'est l'amour" — 3:21

=== 1993 remixes ===
12" maxi

1. "C'est l'amour (techno club remix) — 5:07
2. "C'est l'amour (love club remix) — 5:13
3. "C'est l'amour (dance version) — 5:17
4. "C'est l'amour" — 3:24

CD single

1. "C'est l'amour" (radio version) — 3:24
2. "C'est l'amour" (love club remix) — 5:12

CD maxi

1. "C'est l'amour" (radio version) — 3:24
2. "C'est l'amour" (love club remix) — 5:12
3. "C'est l'amour" (techno club remix) — 5:07
4. "C'est l'amour" (dance version) — 5:17

== Versions ==
- Album version
- Dance version
- Instrumental version
- Love club remix
- Love remix
- Radio version
- Techno club remix

== Credits ==
- Guitar by Steve Byrd
- Mixed by Luc Tytgat and Sid Wells
- Produced by Alec Mansion
- Recorded at Good Earth Studio (London) and Studio Pyramide (Brussels)
- Artwork by Steve Sauvage
- Produced by Alec Mansion

== Charts and certifications ==
=== Weekly charts ===
Chart (1987–1988)	Peak position
Belgium (Ultratop 50 Flanders)	24
Europe (European Airplay Top 50)	43
Europe (European Hot 100)	20
France (SNEP)	2
Quebec (ADISQ)	5

=== Certifications ===
Certifications for "C'est l'amour"
Region	Certification	Certified units/sales
France (SNEP)	Gold	500,000^{*}
^{*} Sales figures based on certification alone.
