= Hangover (Taio Cruz song) =

2011 single by Taio Cruz

Single by Taio Cruz featuring Flo Rida

from the album TY.O and The Fast Hits
- Released: 4 October 2011 (US); 18 October 2011 (Germany); 4 March 2012 (UK)
- Recorded: 2011
- Genre: Electronic rock; hip house
- Length: 4:03
- Label: Island
- Songwriters: Henry Walter; Lukasz Gottwald; Taio Cruz; Tramar Dillard
- Producers: Dr. Luke; Cirkut

Taio Cruz singles chronology
"Little Bad Girl" (2011)	"Hangover" (2011)	"Troublemaker" (2011)

Flo Rida singles chronology
"Good Feeling" (2011)	"Hangover" (2011)	"Wild Ones" (2011)

"Hangover" is a song by English singer Taio Cruz from his third studio album, TY.O. Released on 4 October 2011 in United States, 18 October 2011 in Germany and 4 March 2012 in the United Kingdom, the song serves as the album's international lead single, and follows "Troublemaker" as the album's second British single. American rapper Flo Rida contributes guest vocals. Another alternate version of the song, titled "Takeover", was leaked online via NewJams.net.

== Background ==
In an interview with Billboard, Taio said that fans can expect more uptempo dance tracks on his forthcoming album. Talking to Billboard, Cruz explained: "The new album will be out by the end of the year; it will be out before Christmas. The new single will be out very, very soon as well." He also said "It's definitely going to be more of the uptempo, fun, energetic vibe that you've heard on 'Break Your Heart', 'Higher' and 'Dynamite'." Speaking about potential collaborations, Cruz revealed: "There are a few guests—David Guetta and Ludacris ('Little Bad Girl')—but we have a couple more on there that will be good surprises too."

It was co-written and produced by Dr. Luke and Cirkut. This is Dr. Luke's third collaboration with Taio Cruz (after "Dynamite" and "Dirty Picture") and fifth collaboration with guest vocalist Flo Rida (after "Right Round", "Touch Me", "Who Dat Girl", and "Good Feeling"). This is also the third collaboration between Flo Rida and Cirkut, following "Who Dat Girl" and "Good Feeling".

== Music video ==
A music video to accompany the release of "Hangover" was released to YouTube on 25 October. It lasts for a total length of four minutes and forty-nine seconds. Flo Rida makes a cameo in the video, which sees Cruz driving a speedboat down a high street. The clip also includes actor and comedian Bobby Lee dressed as a bear, being bottle-fed in a cot, and also visualises a party on a private jet. The video ends with a short scene in which Lee picks out "a black outfit" from a closet full of black outfits, then proceeds to dance, begging Cruz not to fire him.

== Live performances ==
Cruz performed the song on The Tonight Show with Jay Leno and during the finale of The Voice of Holland's second season. He also performed it at grand launching of NET. TV in 2013 along with "Break Your Heart".

== Cover versions ==
Scottish heavy metal band Alestorm covered this song on their studio album Sunset on the Golden Age.

Russian post-hardcore band Rave-UP! covered this song.

== Track listing ==
- Digital download
1. "Hangover" – 4:03
- German CD single
1. "Hangover" – 4:03
2. "Hangover" (No Rap) – 4:00
- Digital download
1. "Hangover" – 4:03
2. "Hangover" (Laidback Luke Extended Remix) – 5:31
3. "Hangover" (Laidback Luke Dub Remix) – 5:20
4. "Hangover" (Hardwell Extended Remix) – 5:50
5. "Hangover" (Stinkahbell Remix) – 3:47
- Digital download – EP
1. "Hangover" (Laidback Luke Extended Remix) – 5:31
2. "Hangover" (Laidback Luke Dub Remix) – 5:20
3. "Hangover" (Hardwell Remix Radio Edit) – 3:12
4. "Hangover" (Hardwell Extended Remix) – 5:50
5. "Hangover" (Hardwell Instrumental) – 5:50
6. "Hangover" (Jump Smokers Radio Edit) – 3:29
7. "Hangover" (Jump Smokers Extended Mix) – 4:26
8. "Hangover" (Jump Smokers Instrumental) – 4:24

== Charts ==
=== Weekly charts ===
Weekly chart performance for "Hangover"
Chart (2011–12)	Peak position
Australia (ARIA)	3
Austria (Ö3 Austria Top 40)	1
Belgium (Ultratop 50 Flanders)	12
Belgium (Ultratop 50 Wallonia)	13
Canada Hot 100 (Billboard)	13
Czech Republic Airplay (ČNS IFPI)	14
Denmark (Tracklisten)	15
Finland (Suomen virallinen lista)	8
France (SNEP)	8
Germany (GfK)	2
Hungary (Dance Top 40)	12
Hungary (Single Top 40)	5
Ireland (IRMA)	22
Netherlands (Dutch Top 40)	5
Netherlands (Single Top 100)	12
New Zealand (Recorded Music NZ)	10
Norway (VG-lista)	3
Romania (Romanian Top 100)	65
Russia Airplay (TopHit)	15
Scottish Singles Sales (Official Charts)	17
South Korea International Singles (Gaon)	63
Spain (Promusicae)	29
Sweden (Sverigetopplistan)	14
Switzerland (Schweizer Hitparade)	1
UK Hip Hop/R&B (Official Charts)	9
UK Singles (Official Charts)	27
Ukraine Airplay (TopHit)	37
US Billboard Hot 100	62
US Dance Club Songs (Billboard)	2
US Pop Airplay (Billboard)	37
US Rhythmic Airplay (Billboard)	37

=== Year-end charts ===
2011 year-end chart performance for "Hangover"
Chart (2011)	Position
Australia (ARIA)	56
Austria (Ö3 Austria Top 40)	28
Germany (Official German Charts)	23
Hungary (Dance Top 40)	95
Switzerland (Schweizer Hitparade)	47

2012 year-end chart performance for "Hangover"
Chart (2012)	Position
Australia (ARIA)	95
Austria (Ö3 Austria Top 40)	25
Belgium (Ultratop Flanders)	87
Belgium (Ultratop Wallonia)	75
Canada (Canadian Hot 100)	77
France (SNEP)	75
Germany (Official German Charts)	32
Hungary (Dance Top 40)	46
Hungary (Rádiós Top 40)	86
Italy (FIMI)	77
Netherlands (Dutch Top 40)	41
Netherlands (Single Top 100)	59
Russia Airplay (TopHit)	77
Sweden (Sverigetopplistan)	89
Switzerland (Schweizer Hitparade)	14
Ukraine Airplay (TopHit)	83
US Dance Club Songs (Billboard)	20

== Certifications ==
Certifications and sales for "Hangover"
Region	Certification	Certified units/sales
Australia (ARIA)	4× Platinum	280,000^{^}
Austria (IFPI Austria)	2× Platinum	60,000^{*}
Belgium (BRMA)	Gold	15,000^{*}
Brazil (Pro-Música Brasil)	Platinum	60,000^{‡}
Denmark (IFPI Danmark)	Gold	15,000^{^}
Germany (BVMI)	3× Platinum	900,000^{‡}
Italy (FIMI)	Platinum	70,000^{‡}
New Zealand (RMNZ)	Gold	7,500^{*}
Spain (Promusicae)	Gold	30,000^{‡}
Sweden (GLF)	2× Platinum	80,000^{‡}
Switzerland (IFPI Switzerland)	3× Platinum	90,000^{^}
United Kingdom (BPI)	Silver	200,000^{‡}
Streaming
Denmark (IFPI Danmark)	2× Platinum	1,800,000^{†}
^{*} Sales figures based on certification alone.^{^} Shipments figures based on certification alone.^{‡} Sales+streaming figures based on certification alone.^{†} Streaming-only figures based on certification alone.

== Radio and release history ==
Release dates for "Hangover"
Region	Date	Format
United States	4 October 2011	Digital download
United States	18 October 2011	Rhythmic contemporary radio
Germany	18 October 2011	Digital download
Germany	26 October 2011	CD single
Worldwide	7 October 2011	Digital Download
Worldwide	16 December 2011	Digital Download – The Remixes EP
United Kingdom	4 March 2012	Digital download
