= Troublemaker (Taio Cruz song) =

2011 single by Taio Cruz

Single by Taio Cruz

from the album TY.O and The Fast Hits
- Released: 9 December 2011
- Recorded: 2011
- Genre: R&B; electropop
- Length: 3:40
- Label: Island
- Songwriter(s): Taio Cruz; Steve Angello; Rami Yacoub; Carl Falk
- Producer(s): Taio Cruz; Carl Falk; Rami Yacoub; Steve Angello

Taio Cruz singles chronology
"Hangover" (2011)	"Troublemaker" (2011)	"There She Goes" (2012)

"Troublemaker" is an electropop song by British singer-songwriter Taio Cruz, released as the second single from his third studio album, TY.O. It was released in Germany on 9 December 2011 before being released in the United Kingdom as the album's lead single on 1 January 2012. The song was written and produced by Cruz, Steve Angello, Rami Yacoub and Carl Falk. Cruz performed the song on The Voice of Germany on 27 January 2012.

== Background ==
In an interview with Billboard, Cruz claimed that fans could expect more uptempo dance tracks on his then-forthcoming album. He explained: "The new album will be out before Christmas. We'll have had a couple of singles before then, too. It's definitely going to be more of the uptempo, fun, energetic vibe that you've heard on 'Break Your Heart', 'Higher' and 'Dynamite'. There are also a few guests on the album – David Guetta and Ludacris, just to name two – but we have a couple more on there that will be big surprises."

== Music video ==
The music video for Troublemaker was illegally leaked to YouTube on 7 October 2011 without an official premiere. The video features Cruz performing the song in a warehouse, surrounded by a series of female dancers against a white background. The clip also sees two Lamborghini Gallardos crash head first into a concrete wall, while Cruz performs the track in between them. The video lasts for a total length of four minutes and two seconds. The video was removed just hours after its leak, but was officially reinstated on 10 November 2011.

== Track listing ==
- German CD single
1. "Troublemaker" - 3:40
2. "Troublemaker" (DJ Wonder Remix) - 4:27
- Digital download
1. "Troublemaker" - 3:40
2. "Troublemaker" (DJ Wonder Remix) - 4:27
3. "Troublemaker" (Vato Gonzalez Remix) - 5:04
4. "Troublemaker" (JWLS Remix) - 5:51

== Charts and certifications ==
=== Weekly charts ===
Chart (2011–12)	Peak position
Australia (ARIA)	10
Austria (Ö3 Austria Top 40)	12
Belgium (Ultratip Bubbling Under Flanders)	14
Belgium (Ultratip Bubbling Under Wallonia)	7
France (SNEP)	90
Germany (GfK)	6
Hungary (Rádiós Top 40)	27
Ireland (IRMA)	18
Netherlands (Dutch Top 40)	22
Netherlands (Single Top 100)	50
Scotland (OCC)	2
Switzerland (Schweizer Hitparade)	7
UK Hip Hop/R&B (OCC)	2
UK Singles (OCC)	3
US Hot Dance Club Songs (Billboard)	31

=== Year-end charts ===
Chart (2012)	Position
Austria (Ö3 Austria Top 40)	63
Germany (Media Control AG)	46
Switzerland (Schweizer Hitparade)	58
UK Singles (Official Charts Company)	131

=== Certifications ===
Region	Certification	Certified units/sales
Australia (ARIA)	Platinum	70,000^{^}
Germany (BVMI)	Gold	150,000^{^}
Switzerland (IFPI Switzerland)	Platinum	30,000^{^}
^{^} Shipments figures based on certification alone.

== Release history ==
Region	Date	Format
Germany	9 December 2011	CD single, digital download
United Kingdom	1 January 2012	Digital download

== See also ==
- List of UK top-ten singles in 2012
