= Trust Me (Craig David album) =

Studio album by Craig David
- Released: 12 November 2007
- Genres: R&B; dance-pop; hip-hop
- Length: 43:19
- Labels: Warner Bros.; Sire
- Producers: Martin Terefe; Fraser T. Smith

Craig David chronology
The Story Goes... (2005)	Trust Me (2007)	Greatest Hits (2008)

Singles from Trust Me
- 1. "Hot Stuff (Let's Dance)" Released: 5 November 2007; 2. "6 of 1 Thing" Released: 18 February 2008; 3. "Officially Yours" Released: 16 June 2008

Trust Me is the fourth studio album by the English singer Craig David. It was released on 12 November 2007 in the United Kingdom before being issued in several other countries. Seeking to capture the immediacy of his live performances, David recorded much of the album in Havana, Cuba, adopting a raw, performance-driven approach encouraged by producer Martin Terefe. Emphasizing authenticity over technical perfection, the recording process resulted in a more organic sound characterized by soulful horn arrangements and subtle Latin influences inspired by Cuban music. In addition to Terefe, David collaborated extensively with producer Fraser T. Smith throughout the album's production.

The album received mixed reviews from critics, with several reviewers praising the album's musical diversity, mature sound, and Terefe's production, while others criticized its inconsistent style, derivative elements, and clichéd lyrics. Commercially, the album performed modestly compared to David's earlier releases, peaking at number 18 on the UK Albums Chart and achieving limited international success, although it was certified Gold by the British Phonographic Industry (BPI). Three singles were released in promotion of the album, including lead single "Hot Stuff (Let's Dance)," which samples David Bowie's "Let's Dance" and became a top ten hit in Finland, Denmark, Sweden and the United Kingdom.

== Background ==
In September 2005, Craig David released his third studio album The Story Goes.... Although it was a top-ten success in many countries, it failed to match the immense success of his previous two albums, Born to Do It (2000) and Slicker Than Your Average (2002). Nevertheless, the album achieved Platinum status in the United Kingdom and produced the top-ten hits “All the Way” and “Don’t Love You No More (I’m Sorry).” "All the Way" and "Don't Love You No More (I'm Sorry)." In the meantime, David collaborated with rapper Kano on the song "This Is the Girl" for his album London Town. Released as a single on 27 August 2007, "This Is the Girl" entered the UK Singles Chart at number 18.

For his next project, David sought to create an album that captured the spontaneity and emotional immediacy of his live performances. While he described himself as a perfectionist in the recording studio, producer Martin Terefe encouraged a different approach during the making of Trust Me. Terefe aimed to prioritize performance over technical perfection, urging David to embrace a rawer and more authentic recording process. To achieve this, much of the album was recorded in Havana, Cuba. Terefe selected the location for its rich musical heritage and distinctive creative atmosphere, believing that the change of environment would inspire new artistic directions. Working with older and more basic recording equipment than he was accustomed to, David found the process more demanding. Rather than relying on extensive editing and multiple takes, recordings often had to capture a complete performance in the moment, with mistakes either retained or requiring the session to begin again. David later remarked that the imperfections preserved on the record contributed to its authenticity and realism. The Cuban recording sessions also influenced the album's musical direction. Drawing inspiration from the country's musical culture and the abilities of local musicians, the finished songs incorporated a more upbeat and soulful sound characterized by prominent horn arrangements and subtle Latin influences.

== Promotion ==
Three singles were released in support of the album. "Hot Stuff (Let's Dance)," which samples David Bowie's 1983 hit single "Let's Dance," was released on 5 November 2007 as the album's lead single. An international chart success, it reached the top 10 in several countries, including number two in Croatia, number three in Finland, and number seven on the UK Singles Chart. Follow-up "6 of 1 Thing," released on 17 February 2008, peaked at number 39 on the UK Singles Chart but performed better on the UK Hip Hop and R&B Singles Chart, peaking at number three. Third and final single "Officially Yours" was released on 23 June 2008 and peaked at number 158 on the UK Singles Chart, becoming David's lowest-charting single yet.

== Critical reception ==
Professional ratings
Aggregate scores
Source	Rating
Metacritic	53/100
Review scores
Source	Rating
AllMusic	3/5 stars
The Guardian	2/5 stars
NME	3/5 stars
Now	2/5 Ns
Robert Christgau	(1-star Honorable Mention)
USA Today	2.5/4 stars
Yahoo! Music UK	6/10

Trust Me received mixed reviews from music critics. At Metacritic, which assigns a normalised rating out of 100 to reviews from mainstream critics, Trust Me has an average score of 53 based on 9 reviews, indicating "mixed or average reviews". Anna Britten from Yahoo! Music UK praised Trust Me, describing it as a successful effort by David to move beyond his public image through a diverse mix of R&B, soul, Latin, and reggae influences. She commended the album's songwriting and musical variety, while noting that some of its lyrics relied on familiar clichés. In his review for BBC Music, Tom Young praised Trust Me as proof that David had "matured into the real deal" for UK R&B, applauding its "sharp image," "equally incisive sound," and mix of catchy pop, soul, and reggae influences. He concluded that "it seems like Craig really was born to do it after all," predicting the album would be "lavished with awards." Sputnikmusic described Trust Me as a successful comeback for David, praising its blend of familiar strengths with greater musical variety and experimentation. The reviewer singled out several songs as highlights, although "Top of the Hill" and portions of the album's lyrics were criticized.

Writing for Billboard, Mikael Wood was commendable towards Terefe's production having "loads of ear-tickling detail" throughout the track listing, but singled out "Just a Reminder" for having David's "strongest vocal performance", saying "[I]t's perfect for Robin Thicke fans worried that Thicke's upcoming disc won't include another "Lost Without U"." A writer for NME gave a moderately positive assessment, stating that Trust Me "works, kinda, by doing R&B without palely imitating US fare," highlighting the "smooth '80s dance-pop" of "Hot Stuff" for its use of David Bowie's "Let's Dance". Alex MacPherson of The Guardian was more critical, arguing that the album's opening run of sample-driven R&B tracks could not shake the "cut-price dancefloor feeling" associated with British pop, though he considered them more engaging than the album's ballads, which he found lacking in interest and edge. Now critic Jason Richards gave Trust Me a negative review, criticizing its inconsistent mix of styles and arguing that it jumps awkwardly between genres. He described the opening track as a "clumsy Bowie-sampling party song" and suggested that much of the album feels derivative, with several songs imitating other artists rather than establishing a distinct identity. Reviewing the album for The San Francisco Chronicle, Aidin Vaziri gave the album a negative assessment, arguing that it lacked the energy and originality of David's earlier work. He criticized its reliance on "tired ideas," highlighting the Bowie-sampling "Hot Stuff" and describing several of the album's ballads as heavily clichéd.

== Commercial performance ==
Trust Me experienced a comparatively modest commercial performance relative to David's preceding studio albums. The album debuted and peaked at number 18 on the UK Albums Chart, becoming his lowest-charting studio album at the time of release. Internationally, it achieved limited chart success, reaching number 59 in Australia, number 62 in Germany, number 76 in Ireland, and number 37 in the Netherlands, while failing to enter the US Billboard 200. In Italy and Switzerland, however, the album performed slightly more strongly, peaking at numbers 19 and 16 respectively. Despite its weaker chart performance overall, Trust Me was certified Gold by the British Phonographic Industry (BPI).

== Track listing ==
Trust Me track listing
No.	Title	Writer(s)	Producer(s)	Length
1.	"Hot Stuff (Let's Dance)"	Craig David; Fraser T. Smith; David Bowie	Smith	3:42
2.	"6 of 1 Thing"	David; Smith	Smith	3:47
3.	"Friday Night"	David; Eg White	Martin Terefe	3:33
4.	"Awkward" (featuring Rita Ora)	David; Terefe; Glen Scott; Martin Jonsson; Tommy Sims	Terefe	3:37
5.	"Just a Reminder"	David; Terefe; Scott; Jonsson; Sims	Terefe	3:49
6.	"Officially Yours"	David; Iain James; Curtis Richardson; Hiten Bharadia; Paulo Mendonça	Terefe	3:55
7.	"Kinda Girl for Me"	David; Smith; Linda Creed; Thomas Bell	Terefe; Smith	3:47
8.	"She's on Fire"	David; Smith; Christopher Harrison; Cleveland Browne; Patrick Thomas; Phillip Smart; Wycliffe Johnson	Terefe; Smith	5:04
9.	"Don't Play with Our Love"	David; Paul Barry	Terefe	3:59
10.	"Top of the Hill"	David; Terefe	Terefe	3:54
11.	"This Is the Girl" (with Kano)	David; Smith; Kane Robinson	David; Kano; Smith	4:10
Total length:				43:19

iTunes Store edition bonus tracks
No.	Title	Writer(s)	Producer(s)	Length
12.	"Just a Reminder" (live)	David; Terefe; Scott; Jonsson; Sims	Terefe	4:10
13.	"Officially Yours" (live)	David; James; Richardson; Bharadia; Mendonca	Terefe	3:55
Total length:				51:24

Japanese bonus tracks
No.	Title	Writer(s)	Producer(s)	Length
12.	"Hot Stuff (Let's Dance)" (Touche mix)	David; Smith; Bowie	Smith	5:49
13.	"Hot Stuff (Let's Dance)" (Chase & Status remix)	David; Smith; Bowie	Smith; Chase & Status	4:08
Total length:				53:16

Sample credits

- "Hot Stuff (Let's Dance)" features a sample from "Let's Dance" as performed by David Bowie.
- "Kinda Girl for Me" incorporates elements of "You Are Everything" as performed by The Stylistics.
- "She's on Fire" features samples of "Hot Dis Year" as performed by Dirtsman and "Coca Cola Bottle Shape" as performed by Simpleton.
- "This Is the Girl" contains an interpolation of "Too Blind To See It" as performed by Kym Sims.

== Personnel ==
Credits adapted from album's liner notes.

- Alexander Aberu – trumpet (tracks 2–4, 9)
- David Angell – violin (tracks 4, 5, 10)
- Joaquin Betancourt – horns (tracks 2–4, 9)
- John Catchings – cello (tracks 4, 5, 10)
- Craig David – vocals (all tracks), producer (track 11)
- David Davidson – string arrangements and violin (tracks 4, 5, 10)
- Emilio "Emilito" Del Monte Jr. – congas (tracks 2–6, 9, 10)
- Emilio "Puro" Del Monte Sr. – timbales (tracks 2–5, 9, 10)
- Steve Fitzmaurice – mixing (track 11)
- Chris Gehringer – mastering (all tracks)
- Dyre Gormsen – engineer (tracks 2–6, 9, 10)
- Isobell Griffiths – strings contractor (track 11)
- Jose Louis "Chewy" Hernandez – saxophone (tracks 2–4, 9)
- Iain Hill – additional recording (tracks 2–6, 9, 10)
- Nick Ingman – arrangements and strings conductor (track 11)
- Ian James – backing vocals (track 6)
- Martin Jonsson – drums (tracks 2–6, 9)
- Thomas Juth – mixing assistant (tracks 3, 5, 6, 10)
- Kano – producer and vocals (track 11)
- Chris Laurence – string bass (track 11)
- Tony Maserati – mixing (tracks 3–6)
- Paulo Mendonca – guitar (track 6)
- Perry Montague-Mason – violin (track 11)
- Andreas Olsson – programming (tracks 2–5, 9), beats and programming (track 6), beats and guitar (track 10)
- Rita Ora – vocals (track 4), backing vocals (track 2)
- Amaury Perez – trombone (tracks 2–4, 9)
- Kelly Pribble – additional recording (tracks 4, 5, 10)
- Glen Scott – Hammond organ, piano, and backing vocals (tracks 2–6, 9), synthesizer (tracks 6, 9)
- Baeho "Bobby" Shin – additional recording (tracks 4, 5, 10)
- Tommy Sims – electric bass and backing vocals (tracks 2–4, 6, 9), acoustic guitar (track 5)
- Fraser T Smith – producer (tracks 1, 2, 7, 8, 11), mixing, keyboards, and drum programming (tracks 1, 2, 7, 8), guitar (track 1)
- Kristoffer Sonne – drums (track 10)
- George Tandero – mixing assistant (tracks 3, 5, 6, 10)
- Martin Terefe – producer (tracks 3–6, 9, 10), additional production (tracks 7, 8), guitar (tracks 2–4, 6, 9, 10), bass and backing vocals (tracks 5, 10)
- Ivo Van Der Werff – viola (track 11)
- Jose-Raul Varonay – additional recording (tracks 2–6, 9, 10)
- Kris Wilkinson – viola (tracks 4, 5, 10)
- Jonathan Williams – cello (track 11)
- Nina Woodford – backing vocals (track 7)
- Warren Zielinski – violin (track 11)

== Charts ==
Chart performance for Trust Me
Chart (2007–2008)	Peak position
Australian Albums (ARIA)	59
Belgian Albums (Ultratop Flanders)	49
Belgian Albums (Ultratop Wallonia)	39
Dutch Albums (Album Top 100)	37
French Albums (SNEP)	18
German Albums (Offizielle Top 100)	62
Irish Albums (IRMA)	76
Italian Albums (FIMI)	19
Japanese Albums (Oricon)	11
Scottish Albums (Official Charts)	47
Spanish Albums (Promusicae)	28
Swedish Albums (Sverigetopplistan)	53
Swiss Albums (Schweizer Hitparade)	16
UK Albums (Official Charts)	18
UK R&B Albums (Official Charts)	8
US Top R&B/Hip-Hop Albums (Billboard)	58

== Certifications ==
Certifications of Trust Me, with sales where available
Region	Certification	Certified units/sales
United Kingdom (BPI)	Gold	100,000^{^}
^{^} Shipments figures based on certification alone.
