= Muriel Dacq =

Belgian singer-songwriter

- Born: Muriel Desclée; 11 July 1962 (age 64)
- Origin: Belgium
- Genres: Pop, Italo disco
- Occupations: Singer, songwriter
- Years active: 1986–1997

Muriel Dacq (real name Muriel Desclée de Maredsous) is a Belgian (Walloon) singer-songwriter, active in the 1980s in France.

== Biography ==
In the early 1980s, Muriel Dacq released "L'Enfer à l'envers" and "Ni pourquoi ni comment". Her biggest hit was "Tropique", released in France in 1986. It reached number 6 on the SNEP singles chart and earned a Silver disc for a minimum of 200,000 copies sold. At the time, the singer was married to Alec Mansion, a member of the trio Léopold Nord & Vous which had success in 1987 with the song "C'est l'amour", produced by Dacq. She also released "Là où ça???" in 1986, but it was unsuccessful (#42 in France). In 1995, she tried to revive her singing career recording a new album Ohé du vaisseau, and a single entitled "Un peu + d'amour", under the pseudonym of Black & Dacq.

== Discography ==
=== Albums ===
- 1995 : Ohé du vaisseau

=== Singles ===
- 1986 : "Tropique" – No. 6 in France, Silver disc
- 1986 : "Là où ça ?" – No. 42 in France
- 1987 : "Je craque"
- 1989 : "L'Enfer à l'envers"
- 1990 : "Ni pourquoi ni comment"
- 1991 : "Petit Papa Noël" (under the name Muriel Dacq and the Oufties)
- 1997 : "Un peu + d'amour"

=== Other songs ===
- 1985 : "Pardon"
- "Paternel éternel"
- "Transmusique"
