= Fast Car (Taio Cruz song) =

Single by Taio Cruz

from the album TY.O and The Fast Hits
- Released: 4 August 2012
- Recorded: 2011
- Genre: Dance-pop
- Length: 3:45
- Label: Island Records
- Songwriters: Taio Cruz; Max Martin; Klas Åhlund; Usher Raymond IV; Alexander Kronlund; Adam Jewelle Baptiste
- Producers: Max Martin; Klas Åhlund

Taio Cruz singles chronology
| "World in Our Hands" (2012) | "Fast Car" (2012) | "Don't You Dare" (2014) |

"Fast Car" is a song by English singer-songwriter Taio Cruz from his third studio album, TY.O (2011). The track, which was written exclusively for the American release, was released as the album's second single in the U.S. and does not feature on the European edition of the album. The track was written by Cruz, Max Martin, Klas Ahlund, Usher, Alexander Kronlund, Adam Jewelle Baptiste, while production was handled by Martin and Åhlund. The music video was released on 5 November 2012.

== Track listing ==
Digital download
| No. | Title | Lyrics | Producer | Length |
|---|---|---|---|---|
| 1. | "Fast Car" | Cruz, Max Martin, Klas Ahlund, Usher Raymond IV, Alexander Kronlund, Adam Jewelle Baptiste | Max Martin, Klas Ahlund | 3:45 |

== Credits and personnel ==
- Lead vocals – Taio Cruz
- Producers – Max Martin, Klas Ahlund
- Lyrics – Cruz, Max Martin, Klas Ahlund, Usher Raymond IV, Alexander Kronlund, Adam Jewelle Baptiste
- Label: Island Records

== Chart performance ==
| Chart (2012) | Peak position |
|---|---|
| Australia (ARIA) | 28 |
| Austria (Ö3 Austria Top 40) | 34 |
| Germany (GfK) | 39 |
| Slovakia Airplay (ČNS IFPI) | 67 |
| UK Singles (Official Charts Company) | 180 |

== Release history ==
| Region | Date | Format | Label |
|---|---|---|---|
| Australia | 4 August 2012 | Digital download | Island Records |
| United States | 7 August 2012 | Digital download | Island Records |
| United States | 14 August 2012 | Mainstream airplay | Island Records |
