= Give Me a Reason (Triple 8 song) =

Single by Triple 8
- B-side: "The Best I Never Had" (CD 1); "Upside" (CD 2)
- Released: 21 July 2003
- Recorded: 2003
- Genre: Pop/Rock, Hip hop, RnB
- Length: 3:28
- Label: Universal/Polydor
- Songwriter(s): David Eriksen; Wayne Hector
- Producer(s): David Eriksen

Triple 8 singles chronology
"Knockout" (2003)	"Give Me a Reason" (2003)	"Good 2 Go" (2003)

"Give Me a Reason" is a song recorded by the British pop/rock group Triple 8 in 2003. It was released as a single on 21 July 2003 in the United Kingdom. The single debuted at a peak position of number 9 in the UK Singles Chart.

== Track listing ==
CD 1

1. "Give Me a Reason" 3:28
2. "The Best I Never Had" 3:32
3. "Give Me a Reason" (K-Warren remix) 5:01
4. "Give Me a Reason" (Video) 3:25
5. Behind the scenes interview (Video) 1:59

CD 2

1. "Give Me a Reason" 3:28
2. "Upside" 3:15
3. "Give Me a Reason" (Bastone & Burnz club mix) 7:15
4. Triple 8 Home Movie (Video) 1:59

== Charts ==
Chart (2003)	Peak Position
UK Singles (The Official Charts Company)	9
