= World in Our Hands =

Single by Taio Cruz

from the album TY.O and The Fast Hits
- Released: 27 July 2012
- Recorded: 2011
- Genre: Dance-pop; R&B
- Length: 3:19
- Label: Island Records
- Songwriters: Cruz; Michel Zitron; Rami Yacoub; Carl Falk; Iain James
- Producers: Falk; Yacoub; Cruz

Taio Cruz singles chronology
"There She Goes" (2012)	"World in Our Hands" (2012)	"Fast Car" (2012)

"World in Our Hands" is a song by English singer-songwriter Taio Cruz from his third studio album, TY.O. The track was released as the album's fourth single in Germany on 27 July 2012 and served as the official anthem for the ZDF coverage of the 2012 Summer Olympics. The track was written by Cruz, Michael Zitron, Rami Yacoub, Carl Falk and Iain James, and produced by Falk, Yacoub and Cruz.

== Music video ==
The official music video for the track premiered on 5 July 2012, at a total length of three minutes and 26 seconds. The video features footage of the 2008 Summer Olympics held in Beijing, intertwined with footage of Cruz performing the song with a live band on a jetty.

== Track listing ==
- CD single
1. "World in our Hands" – 3:19
2. "There She Goes" (Moto Blanco Remix) – 3:25

== Charts ==
Chart (2012)	Peak position
Austria (Ö3 Austria Top 40)	5
Germany (GfK)	4
Luxembourg Digital Songs (Billboard)	3
Switzerland (Schweizer Hitparade)	40

=== Year-end charts ===
Chart (2012)	Position
Austria (Ö3 Austria Top 40)	65
Germany (Media Control AG)	53

== Certifications ==
Region	Certification	Certified units/sales
Germany (BVMI)	Gold	150,000^{‡}
^{‡} Sales+streaming figures based on certification alone.

== Credits and personnel ==
- Lead vocals – Taio Cruz
- Producers – Rami Yacoub, Carl Falk, Taio Cruz
- Lyrics – Taio Cruz, Michel Zitron, Rami Yacoub, Carl Falk, Iain James
- Label: Island Records

== Release history ==
Region	Date	Format	Label
Germany	27 July 2012	CD single	Island Records
