= Je Crois =

Single by Roberto Bellarosa

from the album Ma voie
- Released: July 6, 2012
- Recorded: 2012
- Genre: Pop
- Length: 2:58
- Label: SME Belgium NV, 8ball Music
- Songwriter(s): Quentin Mosimann, Thierry Leteurtre, Maud Brooke
- Producer(s): Tiery-F

Roberto Bellarosa singles chronology
"Jealous Guy" (2012)	"Je Crois" (2012)	"Apprends-moi" (2012)

"Je Crois" (I believe) is a song performed by Belgian singer Roberto Bellarosa, released as the second single from his debut studio album Ma voie (2012). It was released on July 6, 2012 as a digital download in Belgium on iTunes. The song was written by Quentin Mosimann, Thierry Leteurtre, Maud Brooke and produced by Tiery-F.

== Music video ==
A music video to accompany the release of "Je Crois" was first released onto YouTube on July 27, 2012 at a total length of two minutes and fifty-seven seconds.

== Track listing ==
Digital download
No.	Title	Length
1.	"Je crois"	2:58

== Credits and personnel ==
- Lead vocals – Roberto Bellarosa
- Producers – Tiery-F
- Lyrics – Quentin Mosimann, Thierry Leteurtre, Maud Brooke
- Label – SME Belgium NV, 8ball Music

== Chart performance ==
Chart (2012)	Peak position
Belgium (Ultratop 50 Wallonia)	37

== Release history ==
Region	Date	Format	Label
Belgium	July 6, 2012	Digital download	SME Belgium NV, 8ball Music
