= Paulo Mendonça =

Paulo Mendonça is a Swedish funk guitarist songwriter and composer of Portuguese origin. He has released five studio albums and one live album, the first three in the 1990s as a performing artist and sold more than 250,000 copies and as a songwriter he received 8× platinum awards. In 1996 he participated at the Montreux Jazz Festival. He toured with Tina Turner among others. In 2008, he collaborated on Jeff Scott Soto's album, Beautiful mess. In 2010 Mendonca worked on several songs on the Hurts album Happiness as a guitarist and background vocalist. In 2013, he released Does anybody wanna funk? which featured the song "Birds and the bees", a moderate success in Sweden and Germany

In 2017 Mendonça co-wrote the song "Funky Song" for the Polish singer Margaret.

== Discography ==
=== Albums ===
Year	Album	Peak positions	Certification
Year	Album	SWE	Certification
1991	Respect My Aim		
1993	Different Phases		
1995	11 PM		
2013	Does Anybody Wanna Funk?	19	
2013	Live From Pama Studio1		
2019	Mindcontrol		

=== Singles ===
Year	Single	Peak positions		Album
Year	Single	SWE	NED	Album
1994	"If You Want My Love"	–	49	

== Discography and certifications as songwriter ==
A discography of songs written and/or produced by Paulo Mendonca.

Year	Song	Artist	Album	Label	Certifications
2007	"Officially Yours"	Craig David	Trust Me	Atlantic/Warner Music UK	United Kingdom (BPI): Gold
2009	"The last Words"	Kevin Borg	The Beginning	Sony BMG	International Federation of the Phonographic Industry (IFPI): Gold
