= Officially Yours =

Single by Craig David

from the album Trust Me
- Released: 23 June 2008
- Recorded: Havana, Cuba
- Genre: R&B
- Length: 3:55
- Label: Warner Bros.; Sire
- Songwriters: Curtis Richardson; Paulo Mendonça; Hiten Bharadia; Iain James; Craig David
- Producer: Martin Terefe

Craig David singles chronology
"6 of 1 Thing" (2008)	"Officially Yours" (2008)	"Where's Your Love" (2008)

Music video
- "Officially Yours" on YouTube

"Officially Yours" is a song by British singer Craig David. It was written by David, Curtis Richardson, Paulo Mendonça, Hiten Bharadia, and Iain James for his fourth studio album, Trust Me (2007). Production on the track was helmed by Martin Terefe. Sire Records released the song on 23 June 2008 as the album's fourth and final single in the United Kingdom where it reached number 158 on the UK Singles Chart.

== Chart performance ==
David confirmed the single release at the BBC Radio 1Xtra live event on 22 March 2008. On 14 May 2008, "Officially Yours" was added to the BBC Radio 2 B-list playlist. In the United Kingdom, the single was at number 130 mid-week. However, on Sunday 29 June 2008, the song reached number 158 in the UK, becoming his lowest-charting single ever.

== Music video ==
The music video for "Officially Yours" was premiered on 1 May 2008 on David's official YouTube channel. It starts with a segment of "She's on Fire" before showing Craig singing on a stage with two dancers behind him in backdrop. The video was done in black and white format and was directed by Barnaby Roper.

== Track listing ==
UK CD1
No.	Title	Writer(s)	Producer(s)	Length
1.	"Officially Yours" (Album Version)	Curtis Richardson; Paulo Mendonça; Hiten Bharadia; Iain James; Craig David	Martin Terefe	3:57
2.	"She's on Fire"	David; Fraser T. Smith; Christopher Harrison; Cleveland Browne; Patrick Thomas; Phillip Smart; Wycliffe Johnson	Terefe; Smith	5:04

UK CD2
No.	Title	Writer(s)	Producer(s)	Length
1.	"Officially Yours" (Album Version)	Richardson; Mendonça; Bharadia; James; David	Terefe	3:57
2.	"Officially Yours" (Kardinal Beats Downbeat Remix)	Richardson; Mendonça; Bharadia; James; David	Terefe; Kardinal Beats^{[a]}	3:15
3.	"Officially Yours" (Pokerface Remix)	Richardson; Mendonça; Bharadia; James; David	Terefe; Pokerface^{[a]}	3:40
4.	"She's on Fire" (Acoustic Video)	David; Smith; Harrison; Browne; Thomas; Smart; Johnson	Terefe; Smith

Notes

- ^{^[a]} signifies an additional producer

== Charts ==
Chart performance for "Officially Yours "
Chart (2008)	Peak position
UK Singles (OCC)	158
