= There She Goes (Taio Cruz song) =

Single by Taio Cruz featuring Pitbull

from the album TY.O and The Fast Hits
- Released: 20 April 2012
- Recorded: 2011
- Genre: Dance-pop
- Length: 3:46
- Label: Island Records
- Songwriter(s): Taio Cruz; RedOne; Armando Perez; Jimmy Joker; AJ Junior; Bilal Hajji
- Producer(s): RedOne; Jimmy Joker

Taio Cruz singles chronology
"Troublemaker" (2011)	"There She Goes" (2012)	"World in Our Hands" (2012)

Pitbull singles chronology
"I'm All Yours" (2012)	"There She Goes" (2012)	"Beat on My Drum" (2012)

"There She Goes" is a song by English singer-songwriter Taio Cruz from his third studio album, TY.O. The track was released physically and digitally as the album's third single on 20 April 2012 in Germany. The song features vocals from American rapper, pop singer-songwriter and record producer Pitbull. The track was later selected to be released as the album's third single in the United Kingdom, being released on 25 June 2012. However, the British release of the track does not feature Pitbull. The track peaked at #12 on the UK Singles Chart.

== Music video ==
The official music video for "There She Goes" was uploaded to Cruz' official YouTube channel on 16 May 2012, at a total length of three minutes and thirty-nine seconds. The video does not feature Pitbull and does not feature his vocals as well. It features Cruz and Uzbek supermodel Nadya Nepomnyashaya in a diner out in the middle of the desert, before taking her across country to a posh nightclub, where the pair perform the song together. It also features a number of mysterious motorcycle riders who drive around Cruz in a parking lot, and a flare display across the desert skyline.

== Track listing ==
- German CD single
1. "There She Goes" – 3:46
2. "There She Goes" (No Pitbull) – 3:29
- UK Digital download EP
1. "There She Goes" (No Pitbull) – 3:28
2. "There She Goes" (Moto Blanco Remix) – 3:25
3. "There She Goes" (Moto Blanco Extended Remix) - 7:13
4. "There She Goes" (Rack 'N' Ruin Remix) – 3:25

== Credits and personnel ==
- Lead vocals – Taio Cruz, Pitbull
- Producers – RedOne, Jimmy Joker
- Lyrics – Taio Cruz, RedOne, Armando Perez, Jimmy Joker, AJ Junior, Bilal Hajji
- Label: Island Records

== Charts ==
=== Weekly charts ===
Chart (2011–12)	Peak position
Austria (Ö3 Austria Top 40)	8
Belgium (Ultratip Bubbling Under Flanders)	38
Belgium (Ultratip Bubbling Under Wallonia)	21
Canada (Canadian Hot 100)	65
France (SNEP)	65
Germany (GfK)	5
Hungary (Editors' Choice Top 40)	38
Ireland (IRMA)	40
Luxembourg Digital Songs (Billboard)	1
Netherlands (Single Top 100)	67
Romania (Romanian Top 100)	27
Russia Airplay (TopHit)	13
Switzerland (Schweizer Hitparade)	2
UK Singles (OCC)	12

=== Year-end charts ===
Chart (2012)	Position
Austria (Ö3 Austria Top 40)	42
Germany (Media Control AG)	34
Russia Airplay (TopHit)	149
Switzerland (Schweizer Hitparade)	51

== Certifications ==
Certifications for "There She Goes"
Region	Certification	Certified units/sales
Germany (BVMI)	3× Gold	450,000^{‡}
Switzerland (IFPI Switzerland)	Gold	15,000^{^}
^{^} Shipments figures based on certification alone.^{‡} Sales+streaming figures based on certification alone.

== Release history ==
Region	Date	Format	Label
Germany	20 April 2012	CD single, digital download	Island Records
France	21 June 2012	Digital download	Island Records
United Kingdom	24 June 2012	Digital download	Island Records
