= À la vie, à l'amour (song) =

1987 single by Jakie Quartz

- French 7" single

Single by Jakie Quartz

from the album Émotion au pluriel
- B-side: "Bye-Bye l'ennui"
- Released: June 1987
- Recorded: 1987
- Genre: Pop
- Length: 4:51
- Label: CBS Records, PWL Continental
- Songwriters: Gérard Anfosso (music); Jakie Quartz (lyrics)
- Producer: Gérard Anfosso

Jakie Quartz singles chronology
| "Vivre ailleurs" (1986) | "À la vie, à l'amour" (1987) | "Émotion" (1987) |

"À la vie, à l'amour" is a song by French singer-songwriter Jakie Quartz. Written by Quartz with a music by Gérard Anfosso, it was released in June 1987 as the lead single from her then-upcoming fourth studio album Émotion au pluriel (1988). It achieved a moderate success in France, Quartz's home-country, being a top 30 hit, and briefly charted in the UK in 1989 after being reworked by the Stock Aitken Waterman team.

== Background and release ==
In 1983, Quartz had her first hit with "Mise au point", written along with Gérard Anfosso. However, following a disagreement with the production team, she had stopped to collaborate with Anfosso, but decided to team up with him again in 1987. He therefore composed a music for which Quartz wrote the lyrics after many listenings, which eventually led to release a song entitled "À la vie, à l'amour" in France in June 1987, with Quartz displaying a drastic change of hairstyle at this occasion.

Thereafter, Pete Waterman, from the then-successful Stock Aitken Waterman production team, proposed a remix by Pete Hammond and a contract with his PWL Continental label, and this version was released as a single in the UK in 1989, accompagnied by a new extended version and a black and white cover, while Waterman heavily promoted the song on his British dance music programme The Hitman and Her. In addition to be one of the tracks on Quartz's 1988 fourth studio album Émotion au pluriel, "À la vie, à l'amour" was also included on the singer's best of compilations Passé Présent (1995) and Référence 80 (2012), and on the EP Amour à vie.

== Lyrics and music video ==
"À la vie, à l'amour" is a pop and Hi-NRG-oriented song. Like "Vivre ailleurs", Quartz's previous single, the song shares a pessimist view on dailylife's misfortunes, several of social issues being mentioned in the verses (hatred, war, alcohol, stress...), whereas the chorus identifies life and love as the ultimate remedies, as the title suggests it. Directed by François Hanss, the music video starts with images of poor and badly dressed children wandering in snowy and empty landscapes. When Quartz arrives, she is welcomed as their savior, and together they form a procession and enter a church. All the children start singing the last chorus and the video ends with them walking towards the sun, and the music gradually giving way to the sound of the wind. The idea was to make a short film in the same vein as the music videos of Mylène Farmer.

== Chart performance ==
In France, "À la vie, à l'amour" debuted at number 42 on the chart edition ending on 18 July 1987, reached a peak of number 30 in its fourth week, and fell off the top 50 after 13 weeks of presence, which remains Quartz's last appearance on the French Singles Chart, as the following two singles from the album failed to chart. The song was also present on the Music & Media's combined Pan-Eurochart Hot 100 singles, on which it charted for three weeks, including a peak at number 92 in its second week. In 1989, after the release of Hammond's remixed version devoted to the UK market, the song entered the singles chart at number 57, peaked at number 55 and charted for a total of three weeks. At the same time, it enjoyed decent airplay in discothèques, thus ranking on the UK Dance top 50 chart for three weeks, with a peak at number 25, on 19 March 1989.

== Track listings ==
- 12" maxi single - France

A. "À la vie, à l'amour" (extended version) – 6:40
B1. "À la vie, à l'amour" – 4:55
B2. "Bye-Bye l'ennui" – 4:27

- 7" single - France

A. "À la vie, à l'amour" – 4:40
B. "Bye-Bye l'ennui" – 4:30

- Mini CD single - France
1. "À la vie, à l'amour" (single version) – 4:40
2. "À la vie, à l'amour" (in the Cannes mix) – 6:30
3. "Bye-Bye l'ennui" – 4:26
- 12" maxi single - UK

A. "À la vie, à l'amour" (in the Cannes mix) – 6:28
B1. "Bye-Bye l'ennui" – 4:30
B2. "À la vie, à l'amour" (single version) – 4:40

- 7" single - UK

A. "À la vie, à l'amour" (single version) – 4:40
B. "Bye-Bye l'ennui" – 4:30

== Personnel ==
Credits adapted from the liner notes of the various formats for "À la vie, à l'amour":

- Gérard Anfosso – music, production ("À la vie, à l'amour", "Bye-Bye l'ennui")
- Emmanuelle Anfosso – children choir
- Sophie Cardell – children choir
- Stéphanie Cardell – children choir
- Antoine Giacomoni – photography
- Emmanuel Guiot – engineering
- Pete Hammond – mixing (in the Cannes mix)
- Bertrand Le Page – publisher
- Serge Pauchard – engineering
- Jackie Quartz – lyrics ("À la vie, à l'amour", "Bye-Bye l'ennui")
- Christine and Laurent for Harlow - hairdressers

== Charts ==
1987 weekly chart performance for "À la vie, à l'amour"
| Chart (1987) | Peak position |
|---|---|
| Europe (Eurochart Hot 100) | 92 |
| France (SNEP) | 30 |
| Quebec (ADISQ) | 22 |

1989 weekly chart performance for "À la vie, à l'amour"
| Chart (1989) | Peak position |
|---|---|
| UK Singles (OCC) | 55 |
| UK Dance (Music Week) | 25 |
