= 6 of 1 Thing =

Single by Craig David

from the album Trust Me
- Released: 17 February 2008
- Recorded: Havana, Cuba
- Genre: R&B; Dance Pop
- Length: 3:47 (album version); 3:14 (radio edit)
- Label: Warner Bros.; Sire
- Songwriters: David; Fraser T Smith
- Producers: Martin Terefe; Fraser T Smith

Craig David singles chronology
"Hot Stuff (Let's Dance)" (2007)	"6 of 1 Thing" (2008)	"Officially Yours" (2008)

Music video
- "6 of 1 Thing" on YouTube

"6 of 1 Thing" is a song by British singer Craig David, released on 17 February 2008 as the third single from his fourth studio album Trust Me. Written by David and Fraser T. Smith and produced by both Smith and Martin Terefe, the track was B-listed by both BBC Radio 1 and BBC Radio 2 and charted at number 39 in the UK Singles Chart after physical release.

== Release ==
"6 of 1 Thing" was released to most European consumers on 18 February 2008; however, it was exclusively released to UK customers via digital download and compact disc on 17 February; online digital download site 7Digital and Woolworths stores across the UK issued the CD and maxi CD single on the Sunday, 24 hours prior to the official release date. The reason for this exclusive early release lies unconfirmed, although some say 7Digital and Woolworths had made "special arrangements" with Warner Music Group so that they were able to grab more of the market than any of their rival companies.

== Music video ==
The music video for "6 of 1 Thing", directed by Phil Griffin, premiered on 11 January 2008 on Craig David's official YouTube account.

== Track listing ==
All tracks written by David and Fraser T. Smith.

UK CD single
No.	Title	Producer(s)	Length
1.	"6 of 1 Thing" (Album Version)	Fraser T. Smith; Martin Terefe	3:47

UK download single
No.	Title	Producer(s)	Length
1.	"6 of 1 Thing" (Radio Edit)	Smith; Terefe	3:20
2.	"6 of 1 Thing" (Soul Seekerz Club Mix)	Smith; Terefe; Soul Seekerz^{[a]}	7:36
3.	"6 of 1 Thing" (Sticky Remix)	Smith; Terefe; Sticky^{[a]}	5:20
4.	"6 of 1 Thing" (Overkillers Remix – Extended Version)	Smith; Terefe; Overkillers^{[a]}	5:18
5.	"6 of 1 Thing" (Primary 1 Remix)	Smith; Terefe; Primary 1^{[a]}	3:10

Remix single
No.	Title	Producer(s)	Length
1.	"6 of 1 Thing" (Remix featuring Ryan Leslie)	Smith; Terefe; Leslie^{[a]}	3:47

Notes

- ^{^[a]} signifies an additional producer

== Charts ==
Chart performance for "6 of 1 Thing"
Chart (2008)	Peak position
Romania (Romanian Top 100)	86
Scottish Singles Sales (Official Charts)	27
UK Singles (Official Charts)	39
UK Hip Hop/R&B (Official Charts)	3

== Release history ==
Release history and formats for "6 of 1 Thing"
Region	Date	Format(s)	Label	Ref.
United Kingdom	17 February 2008	CD single; digital download	Warner Bros.; Sire	
