= Apprends-moi (Roberto Bellarosa song) =

"Apprends-Moi"

Single by Roberto Bellarosa

from the album Ma voie
- Released: October 26, 2012
- Recorded: 2012
- Genre: Pop
- Length: 3:41
- Label: SME Belgium NV, 8ball Music
- Songwriter(s): Han Kooreneef, Christal G
- Producer(s): Tiery-F

Roberto Bellarosa singles chronology
"Je Crois" (2012)	"Apprends-Moi" (2012)	"Love Kills" (2013)

"Apprends-Moi" (Teach Me) is a song performed by Belgian singer Roberto Bellarosa, released as the third single from his debut studio album Ma voie (2012). It was released on October 26, 2012 as a digital download in Belgium on iTunes. The song was written by Han Kooreneef, Christal G and produced by Tiery-F.

== Track listing ==
Digital download
No.	Title	Length
1.	"Apprends-Moi"	3:41

== Credits and personnel ==
- Lead vocals – Roberto Bellarosa
- Producers – Tiery-F
- Lyrics – Han Kooreneef, Christal G
- Label – SME Belgium NV, 8ball Music

== Chart performance ==
Chart (2012)	Peak position
Belgium (Ultratip Bubbling Under Wallonia)	36

== Release history ==
Region	Date	Format	Label
Belgium	October 26, 2012	Digital download	SME Belgium NV, 8ball Music
