= TY.O =

2011 studio album by Taio Cruz

Studio album by Taio Cruz
- Released: 2 December 2011
- Recorded: 2010–2011
- Genre: Dance-pop; electropop
- Length: 39:07
- Label: Island
- Producer: Taio Cruz; Dr. Luke; Cirkut; Steve Angello; Rami Yacoub; Carl Falk; RedOne; Jimmy Joker; Klas Åhlund; Sebastian Ingrosso; Rob Swire; Jason Gilbert; Giorgio Tuinfort; Frédéric Riesterer; Max Martin

Taio Cruz chronology
The Rokstarr Collection (2010)	TY.O (2011)	The Fast Hits EP (2012)

Singles from TY.O
- 1. "Hangover" Released: 4 October 2011; 2. "Troublemaker" Released: 11 November 2011; 3. "There She Goes" Released: 20 April 2012; 4. "World in Our Hands" Released: 27 July 2012; 5. "Fast Car" Released: 7 October 2012

TY.O is the third studio album by British record producer and singer Taio Cruz which features special guest appearances from Flo Rida, Pitbull, David Guetta and Ludacris. Taking a more electronic music sound than his previous releases, TY.O was released in December 2011 by Universal Island Records but for reasons unknown to Cruz, its British and American release were held off. Instead, a year after its original release, an extended play (EP) version of the album titled The Fast Hits was released in the UK on 16 December 2012.

TY.O features a range of top-twenty and top-thirty singles including "Hangover" (featuring Flo Rida), "Troublemaker", "There She Goes" (usually featuring Pitbull), the limited release "World in Our Hands" and "Fast Car", which features on the German special edition and Fast Hits EP versions of the album. It received mixed-to-positive reviews, but the album itself reached the top twenty in Switzerland and top thirty in Germany, considerably less successful than Cruz's previous albums.

== Background ==
Cruz began recording his third studio album in late 2010, where he rumoured that he would be exploring other musical genres for the album, including dubstep and rock anthems. In March 2011, Cruz premiered an all-new song, entitled "Telling the World", which was co-written by himself and Alan Kasiyre for the Rio soundtrack. The track was not featured on any of Cruz's prior studio albums. On 23 May 2011, Cruz received his first Billboard Music Award in the United States, and announced live on stage that his third album would be released in the fourth quarter of 2011, and would be entitled Black and Leather.

In June 2011, Cruz released the collaborative single "Little Bad Girl", with French DJ David Guetta and American rapper Ludacris. The song was relatively successful, reaching top-ten in charts around the world. In an interview, Cruz promised a "fun" and "energetic" album. The album's title was later changed to TY.O as Cruz believed it would help those who mispronounced his name.

A year later in June 2012, Cruz confirmed he was unsure of when TY.O would be released in the UK or US, commenting that it was a "big label decision" and out of his hands. Speaking on how TY.O differs from previous album Rockstarr (2010), Cruz told Digital Spy, "Rokstarr had a lot more rockier songs on it, apart from the singles. This album is a lot more electro-driven."

On 30 September 2014, the album was finally released to American digital markets.

== Singles ==
- "Hangover" was chosen as the album's lead single in Australia, Germany and the United States, where it was released on 4 October 2011, and as the album's second single in the United Kingdom, where it was released on 4 March 2012. The song features vocals from American rapper Flo Rida and peaked at number 27 on the UK Singles Chart.
- "Troublemaker" was chosen as the album's second single in Australia and Germany, where it was released on 11 November 2011, and as the album's lead single in the UK, where it was released on 1 January 2012. The track peaked at number 3 on the UK Singles Chart, number 10 on the ARIA Singles Chart, and number 6 on the German Singles Chart.
- "There She Goes" was chosen as the album's third single in Germany and the UK, being released on 20 April 2012 in Germany and on 25 June 2012 in the UK. The track features vocals from American rapper Pitbull. The track peaked at number 12 on the UK Singles Chart, number 5 on the German Singles Chart and number 40 on the Irish Singles Chart.
- "World in Our Hands" was chosen as the album's fourth single in Germany, and was released on 27 July 2012. The song serves as the official single for German television station ZDF's coverage of the 2012 Summer Olympics in London. The music video features footage from the 2008 games in Beijing, intertwined with performance footage of Cruz.
- "Fast Car", officially impacted American mainstream radio on 14 August 2012. It features on the UK extended play (EP) version of the album, The Fast Hits and on the German special edition.

== Track listing ==
TY.O track listing
No.	Title	Writer(s)	Producer(s)	Length
1.	"Hangover" (featuring Flo Rida)	Taio Cruz, Lukasz Gottwald, Henry Walter	Dr. Luke, Cirkut	4:04
2.	"Troublemaker"	Cruz, Steve Angello, Rami Yacoub, Carl Falk	Cruz, Carl Falk, Rami Yacoub, Steve Angello	3:40
3.	"There She Goes" (featuring Pitbull)	Cruz, RedOne, Armando Perez, Jimmy Joker, AJ Junior, Bilal Hajji	RedOne, Jimmy Joker	3:46
4.	"Shotcaller"	Cruz, Klas Åhlund, Sebastian Ingrosso, Angello	Cruz, Klas Åhlund, Sebastian Ingrosso, Steve Angello	3:24
5.	"Make It Last Forever"	Cruz, Gottwald, Ammar Malik, Walter	Dr. Luke, Cirkut	3:48
6.	"World in Our Hands"	Cruz, Michel Zitron, Yacoub, Falk, Iain James	Cruz, Carl Falk, Rami Yacoub	3:20
7.	"Tattoo"	Cruz, Gottwald, Walter	Dr. Luke, Cirkut	3:12
8.	"Play"	Cruz, Rob Swire	Cruz, Rob Swire	3:15
9.	"You're Beautiful"	Cruz, Jason Gilbert	Cruz, Jason Gilbert	3:19
10.	"Telling the World"	Cruz, Alan Kasirye	Cruz	4:08
11.	"Little Bad Girl" (featuring David Guetta and Ludacris)	Cruz, Christopher Bridges, David Guetta, Giorgio Tuinfort, Frédéric Riesterer	David Guetta, Giorgio Tuinfort, Frédéric Riesterer	3:12

Japanese bonus track
No.	Title	Writer(s)	Producer(s)	Length
12.	"Positive"	Cruz, Steve Angello, Rami Yacoub, Carl Falk	Cruz, Carl Falk, Rami Yacoub, Steve Angello	3:32

Special edition bonus tracks
No.	Title	Writer(s)	Producer(s)	Length
12.	"Fast Car"	Cruz, Max Martin, Klas Åhlund, Usher Raymond IV, Alexander Kronlund, Adam Jewelle Baptiste	Martin, Åhlund	3:45
13.	"Hangover" (featuring Flo Rida; music video)			4:49
14.	"Troublemaker" (music video)			3:42
15.	"There She Goes" (music video)			3:38
16.	"Fast Car" (music video)			3:48
17.	"Fast Car (Behind the Scenes)" (video)			3:42

== The Fast Hits EP ==
The Fast Hits EP

EP by Taio Cruz
- Released: 16 December 2012
- Recorded: 2010–2012
- Genre: Dance-pop, electropop
- Length: 39:07
- Label: Island

Taio Cruz chronology
TY.O (2011)	The Fast Hits EP (2012)

Singles from The Fast Hits EP
- 1. "Troublemaker" Released: 30 December 2011; 2. "Hangover" Released: 2 March 2012; 3. "There She Goes" Released: 24 June 2012; 4. "Fast Car" Released: 17 December 2012

An extended play featuring songs from TY.O called The Fast Hits EP, was released on 16 December 2012. The EP features Cruz's 2010 single "Dynamite" plus singles "Fast Car", "Troublemaker", "Hangover" (with Flo Rida) and "There She Goes" (with Pitbull). It also features four other songs: "World in Our Hands", two remixes of "Fast Car" and one remix of "Dynamite".

The Fast Hits EP track listing
No.	Title	Writer(s)	Producer(s)	Length
1.	"Fast Car"	Cruz, Max Martin, Klas Åhlund, Usher Raymond IV, Alexander Kronlund, Adam Jewelle Baptiste	Martin, Åhlund	3:45
2.	"Hangover" (featuring Flo Rida)	Cruz, Lukasz Gottwald, Henry Walter	Dr. Luke, Cirkut	4:03
3.	"Troublemaker"	Cruz, Steve Angello, Rami Yacoub, Carl Falk	Falk, Yacoub, Angello, Cruz	3:40
4.	"There She Goes" (featuring Pitbull)	Cruz, RedOne, Jimmy Joker, AJ Junior, Bilal Hajji	RedOne, Jimmy Joker	3:46
5.	"World in Our Hands"	Cruz, Michel Zitron, Yacoub, Falk, Iain James	Falk, Yacoub, Cruz	3:20
6.	"Dynamite"	Cruz, Gottwald, Martin, Benjamin Levin, Bonnie McKee	Dr. Luke, Benny Blanco	3:24
7.	"Fast Car" (Popkong Remix)	Cruz, Martin, Åhlund, Raymond IV, Kronlund, Baptiste	Martin, Åhlund	3:35
8.	"Fast Car" (Star One Remix)	Cruz, Martin, Åhlund, Raymond IV, Kronlund, Baptiste	Martin, Åhlund	3:32
9.	"Dynamite" (Quattro Volte Lounge Version)	Cruz, Gottwald, Martin, Levin, McKee	Dr. Luke, Benny Blanco	5:06

== Charts ==
=== Weekly charts ===
Weekly chart performance for TY.O
Chart (2011–2012)	Peak position
Australian Albums (ARIA	97
Austrian Albums (Ö3 Austria)	36
Belgian Heatseekers (Flanders)	1
Belgian Heatseekers (Wallonia)	10
Dutch Albums (Album Top 100)	100
German Albums (Offizielle Top 100)	28
Japanese Albums (Oricon)	52
South Korean Albums (Gaon)	43
Swiss Albums (Schweizer Hitparade)	15

=== Monthly charts ===
Monthly chart performance for TY.O
Chart (2011)	Peak position
Polish Albums (ZPAV)	69

=== Year-end charts ===
Year-end chart performance for TY.O
Chart (2012)	Position
Swiss Albums (Schweizer Hitparade)	71

== Certifications ==
Certifications for TY.O
Region	Certification	Certified units/sales
Austria (IFPI Austria)	Gold	10,000^{*}
Germany (BVMI)	Gold	100,000^{‡}
^{*} Sales figures based on certification alone.^{‡} Sales+streaming figures based on certification alone.

== Release history ==
Release history and formats for TY.O
Region	Date	Format
Germany	2 December 2011	CD, digital download
Portugal	2 December 2011	Digital download
Sweden	2 December 2011	Digital download
Switzerland	2 December 2011	Digital download
Spain	2 December 2011	Digital download
Norway	2 December 2011	Digital download
New Zealand	2 December 2011	Digital download
Netherlands	2 December 2011	Digital download
Luxembourg	2 December 2011	Digital download
Japan	2 December 2011	Digital download
Italy	2 December 2011	Digital download
Greece	2 December 2011	Digital download
Finland	2 December 2011	Digital download
Denmark	2 December 2011	Digital download
Belgium	2 December 2011	Digital download
Austria	2 December 2011	Digital download
Poland	2 December 2011	Digital download
Australia	5 December 2011	Digital download
Canada	5 December 2011	Digital download
Brazil	15 December 2011	CD, digital download
France	30 January 2012	CD, digital download
Germany	9 November 2012	Special Edition
United Kingdom	16 December 2012	The Fast Hits EP
United States	30 September 2014	digital download
