= Léopold Nord & Vous =

Belgian band

- Origin: Belgium
- Genres: Pop
- Years active: 1983–1989 (L. Nord & Vous); 1990–1993 (Les Chéris)
- Past members: Alec Mansion; Benoît Mansion; Hubert Mansion
- Website: A. Mansion official site * B. Mansion official site

Léopold Nord & Vous, then Les Chéris, is a Belgian band founded in 1983. In France, it can be considered as a one-hit wonder for its single "C'est l'amour", but both band and members had a long and successful musical career in Belgium.

== Biography ==
The band was composed of three brothers : Alec (born January 26, 1958), Benoît (February 9, 1964) and Hubert Mansion (October 7, 1960). In France, this trio remains famous for its 1987 hit song "C'est l'amour", its debut single, which was number 2 on the SNEP singles chart and certified Gold disc. The next singles, "Les Hippopotamtam" (1988) and "Des Filles et du Rock and roll" (1989) passed unnoticed and failed the chart. In 1990, the band decided to change its name and became "Les Chéris". Under this new name, the duet (Hubert Mansion has left the band then) released "On en a marre !" the same year, then "Mademoiselle qui passâtes", in 1991.

Alec Mansion debuted his singing career without his brothers. Already in the early 1980s, he released several singles whose sales were very confidential in France, but achieved success in Belgium and Canada. Belgian singer Muriel Dacq, who participated in the production of band's first single and who is mentioned in the credits on the back of the single cover for "C'est l'amour", was Alen Mansion's wife at the time. Mansion also wrote songs for various artists such as Flash Black ("Quand je pense à elle, est-ce qu'elle pense à moi?", in 1987, co-written with his wife), and Nathalie Pâque ("Noël différent", a Christmas song), and composed "Amour Amour", which represented Luxembourg in the Eurovision Song Contest 1987. After the band split off in 1993, he tried again a solo career, releasing, among other singles, "Pop show", "Saltimbanque" and "Say l'printemps", in 2006. He then created several advertising slogans, recorded a new album and began a concert tour called 'Pop Show' (same name of his album) throughout France, tour in which the singer performed songs with a choir and musicians. Alec has four children : Antoine (born in the 1980s), Charlotte (1990), Betty (1992) and Sébastian (1998).

Benoît Mansion began to sing at the age of 18. He released his first solo album in 1994, Le Bonheur c'est quand tu veux.

== Discography ==
=== As Léopold Nord & Vous ===
Albums

- C'est l'amour

Singles

- 1987 : "C'est l'amour" - #2 in France, Gold disc
- 1988 : "Les Hippopotamtam"
- 1989 : "Des Filles et du Rock and roll"

=== As Les Chéris ===
- 1990 : "On en a marre !"
- 1991 : "Mademoiselle qui passâtes"

=== As Les Frères Mansion ===
- 1992 : "Les Travaux de la ferme"

=== Alec Mansion alone ===
Albums

- 2001 : Vivement demain - Gold in Belgium
- 2004 : Pop Show

Singles

- 1980 (?) : "Dans l'eau de Nice"
- 1981 (?) : "Falbala"
- 1982 : "Trop triste"
- 1983 : "Laid, bête et méchant"
- 1984 : "Dans l'eau de Nice"
- 1985 : "Chagrin d'amour"
- 2001 : "Cette femme est un héros"
- 1986 : "Tiens bon"
- 2006 : "Pop Show"
- 2006 : "Saltimbanque"
- 2006 : "Say l'printemps" [sic]
- 2006 : "Je m'en fous"

=== Benoît Mansion (solo) ===
- 1994 : Le bonheur c'est quand tu veux
- 2004 : Du Brésil dans les oreilles
