= Jakie Quartz =

French singer (born 1955)

- Born: Jacqueline Cuchet; 31 July 1955 (age 70)
- Origin: France
- Genres: Pop
- Occupation: Singer
- Years active: 1981–2003

Jakie Quartz (born Jacqueline Cuchet, 31 July 1955) is a French singer. Her biggest hit singles in France were "Mise au point" (1983, covered by Leslie in 2007 and Quentin Mosimann in 2008), "Vivre ailleurs" (1986, #11 in France, produced by Secret Service) and "À la vie, à l'amour" (1987, #30 in France and #55 in the UK Singles Chart)

== Discography ==
=== Albums ===
- Revue et corrigée (musical) - 1982
- Mise au point - 1982
- Alerte à la blonde - 1984
- Jour et nuit - 1986
- Emotion au pluriel - 1987
- Jakie Quartz - 1990

=== Compilations ===
- Bravo à Jakie Quart - 1990
- Présent Passé - 1995
- Jakie Quartz - 2003

=== Singles ===
- "Histoire éphémère" - 1981
- "Mise au point" - 1983
- "Amour exil" - 1983
- "Histoire sans paroles" - 1984
- "Mal de vivre" - 1984
- "Jeu dangereux" - 1985
- "Vivre ailleurs" - 1986
- "À la vie, à l'amour" - 1987
- "EmotIon" - 1987
- "Amour blessé" - 1988
- "Non mais qu'est-ce que tu crois ?" - 1989
- "A la vie à l'amour" (remix) - 1989
- "Mais dis-moi" - 1990
- "Tout ce que tu voudras" - 1990
- "Comme un rêve" - 1992
- "Le meilleur de toi-même" - 1995
- "Que sont-ils devenus ? (la photo)" - 1996
- "Si demain" - 2003
