= Yoko Miwa =

Jazz pianist

Yoko Miwa is a jazz pianist best known for her work with the Yoko Miwa Trio and her appearances on the Boston jazz scene. Miwa, who was born in Kobe, Japan, attended Osaka College of Music, Koyo Conservatory and Berklee College of Music, where she now teaches.

== Career ==
Miwa released her first solo album, In the Mist of Time, in 2001 She has since become known as one of the top jazz piano players from Japan. Her first album with the Yoko Miwa Trio, Fadeless Flower, was released in 2004, featuring Greg Loughman on bass and Scott Goulding on drums, followed by The Day We Said Goodbye in 2007 with Kendall Eddy on bass and Scott Goulding again on drums. She released her first live album, the self-produced Live at Scullers Jazz Club, in 2011. In 2012 the Yoko Miwa trio released Act Naturally with Will Slater on bass and Scott Goulding on drums followed by Pathways in 2017 and Keep Talkin in 2019, which featured a cover of the Beatles' “Golden Slumbers/You Never Give Me Your Money.” In 2021 the Yoko Miwa trio released Songs of Joy on Ubuntu Music, an album written and recorded during the pandemic.

In addition to jazz standards and her own compositions, Miwa has recorded jazz interpretations of a number of classic rock songs, including Dear Prudence by the Beatles, Court and Spark and Conversation by Joni Mitchell and Babe I'm Gonna Leave You by Led Zeppelin.
