= Super Junior 05 =

Studio album by Super Junior 05
- Released: December 5, 2005
- Recorded: 2005
- Studios: In Grid (Seoul); SM Blue Ocean (Seoul); SM Booming System (Seoul); SM Yellow Tail
- Genres: K-pop; bubblegum pop; dance
- Length: 39:54
- Language: Korean
- Labels: SM (Korea); Avex Taiwan (Taiwan)
- Producer: Lee Soo-man

Super Junior 05 chronology
Super Junior 05 (2005)	Don't Don (2007)

Singles from SuperJunior05
- 1. "Twins (Knock Out)" Released: November 11, 2005; 2. "Miracle" Released: February 12, 2006

Super Junior 05 (also known as Twins) is the debut studio album by South Korean boy band Super Junior 05, now known as just Super Junior. It was released through SM Entertainment on December 5, 2005. The album spawned two singles: the group's debut single "Twins (Knock Out)" and "Miracle". Commercially, it peaked at number three on the South Korean monthly MIAK album chart in December 2005, selling 28,536 copies within its first month of release. Since then, the album has sold over 100,000 copies.

== History ==
After achieving critically acclaimed success for their debut performance of the single "Twins (Knock Out)", which was performed on SBS's Popular Songs on November 6, 2005, for the first time, the group was scheduled to release an official single of the song. However, a digital single of "Twins (Knock Out)" was released instead with three more brand new singles available for download on November 11, 2005.

The full album, which included all of the singles in the "Twins (Knock Out)" digital release and several other new tracks, was released on December 5, 2005, in South Korea.

On February 12, 2006, Super Junior started to promote their second promotional single for the album "Miracle". The performance version of the single differs from the one released in the album as the performance single has an added dance break and vocal bridge in the song. In contrast to the edgy, rock-influenced feel of "Twins (Knock Out)", "Miracle" is a light bubblegum pop love song with light-hearted dance choreography. It was the second and last song to be promoted from the album.

Only twelve of the thirteen members of Super Junior are featured in this album as Kyuhyun was not added to the group until six months after this album's release.

== Overview ==
The album's first single, "Twins (Knock Out)" is a rap rock release. Featuring eagle-like dancing, the dance choreography arranged for the song became warmly welcomed and extremely popular. The follow-up single, "Miracle", is a typical K-pop bubblegum pop song, a genre still very welcomed by children and young adults. Like the song itself, the dance choreography for the single is also simpler and softer. The rest of the tracks in their first studio album mainly consist of pop love ballads and also R&B-influenced dance tracks with rap and fast drum beats.

The main themes involved in the album are about situations that are related to love or trust. Soothing ballads like "You are the one" and "So I" intend to create a positive environment in one's love relationship. Fast tracks with light-hearted melodies like "Miracle" and "Way for love" contain bubblegum pop lyrics with positive views of love and trust. However, fast, rap-influenced dance tracks like "Twins (Knock Out)", "Over", "L.O.V.E", and "Keep in Touch" have negative connotations about love and relationships. For example, in "Over", the lyrics hovers around a confident persistence after a relationship breakup. "L.O.V.E" involves a loss of hope and confidence after love is shattered. Likewise, Super Junior's debut track "Twins (Knock Out)" speaks of self-deception and the indecisive aspects of a man's mind, contrasting the feelings between a man towards love and how he has to decide whether or not he should continue to love or fight with sticking to his own destiny.

"Keep in Touch" and "Believe" are cover songs of the Japanese band, EXILE.

== Reception ==
As soon as the album was released, the album hit #1 and stayed at the position throughout the whole week on Korea's Hanteo Weekly Chart. Although Twins was a commercial success after the much anticipated debut of the group in November, the album debuted at #3 spot in the MIAK K-pop Monthly Charts selling 28,536 copies. Later in the same month, Super Junior collaborated with TVXQ and debuted at #1 on MIAK K-pop, selling 49,945 copies.

Twins stayed in the charts throughout 2006, selling an extra 26,510 copies. It sold 10,408 more copies in 2007 and sold 86,659 copies by mid-2008. It remained within the top 60 best-selling albums from 2005 to 2008. When it was released in Taiwan on February 16, 2006, it debuted on the G-Music J-pop Weekly Album Chart at number 16.

== Track listing ==
Twins Track listing
No.	Title	Lyrics	Music	Arrangement	Length
1.	"Miracle"	Yoon Hyo-sang	Daniel Pandher; Tommy La Verdi	Hwang Seong-je	2:56
2.	"Twins (Knock Out)"	Yoo Young-jin	Anders Bagge; Peer Astrom; Reed Vertelney; Michael Berg Andersson; Wayne Hector	Yoo Han-jin	3:20
3.	"You Are the One"	Kenzie	Kathy Cantaluppi; Michael Abatzidis	Kenzie	3:52
4.	"Rock this House"	Yoon Hyo-sang; Eunhyuk	Mick Lister; Haavid Engmark	Ahn Ik-Soo	3:07
5.	"Way for Love" (차근차근; Chageunchageun; lit. 'Carefully')	Feel; Lee Yoon-jae	Lee Yoon-jae	Hwang Seong-je	3:17
6.	"So I"	Han Sang-won; Kwon Ho-joong	Han Sang-won	Han Sang-won	3:43
7.	"Over"	Young-hu Kim; Heechul; Eunhyuk	Young-hu Kim	Ahn Ik-soo	3:16
8.	"Keep in Touch"	Jo Yoon-kyung	Hitoshi Harukawa; Kenn Kato	Hitoshi Harukawa; Kenn Kato	4:31
9.	"L.O.V.E."	Shin Ji-won; Eunhyuk; Kibum	Jens Thoresen; Svein Finneide; Ahn Ik-soo	Ahn Ik-soo	3:36
10.	"Believe"	Heechul	Shunsuke Kiyokiba; Seikou Nagaoka	Seikou Nagaoka	4:54
11.	"Twins (Knock Out)" (instrumental)		Anders Bagge; Peer Astrom; Reed Vertelney; Michael Berg Andersson; Wayne Hector	Yoo Han-jin	3:21
Total length:					39:54

VCD track listing (Japanese ver. only)
No.	Title	Length
1.	"Miracle: Karaoke ver."
2.	"Twins (Knock out): Karaoke ver."
3.	"Dancing Out: Karaoke ver."
4.	"Super Junior's Cover Story"
5.	"Making film of 'Twins (Knock out)'"
6.	"Making film of 'Dancing Out'" (Only in album with catalog no: AVCD075)

== Charts ==
=== Weekly charts ===
Chart (2011)	Peak position
South Korean Albums (Gaon)	14

=== Monthly charts ===
Chart (December 2005)	Peak position
South Korean Albums (MIAK)	3

=== Year-end charts ===
Chart (2005)	Position
South Korean Albums (RIAK)	70
Chart (2006)	Position
South Korean Albums (RIAK)	21

== Release history ==
Country	Date	Distributing label	Format
South Korea	December 5, 2005	SM Entertainment	CD, cassette
Taiwan	February 10, 2006	Avex Taiwan	CD
Japan	February 16, 2006	—N/a	CD + VCD

== See also ==
- Twins
  - Twins (Music Video) on YouTube
- Miracle
  - Miracle (Music Video) on YouTube
