= Love Kills (Roberto Bellarosa song) =

2013 song by Roberto Bellarosa

Single by Roberto Bellarosa
- Released: 15 March 2013
- Recorded: 2012
- Genre: Dance-pop
- Length: 3:00
- Label: SME Belgium, 8ball Music
- Songwriter(s): Jukka Immonen, Iain Farquharson
- Producer(s): Jukka Immonen

Roberto Bellarosa singles chronology
| "Apprends-moi" (2012) | "Love Kills" (2013) | "Suivre mon étoile" (2013) |

Eurovision Song Contest 2013 entry
- Country: Belgium
- Artist(s): Roberto Bellarosa
- Language: English
- Composer(s): Jukka Immonen, Iain Farquharson
- Lyricist(s): Jukka Immonen, Iain Farquharson

Finals performance
- Semi-final result: 5th
- Semi-final points: 75
- Final result: 12th
- Final points: 71

Entry chronology
- ◄ "Would You?" (2012)
- "Mother" (2014) ►

"Love Kills" is a song recorded by Belgian singer Roberto Bellarosa. The song was written by Jukka Immonen and Iain Farquharson. It is best known as Belgium's entry to the Eurovision Song Contest 2013 held in Malmö, Sweden. The song competed in the first semi-finals on 14 May 2013 for a spot in the finals on 18 May 2013. During the first semi-finals, Belgium was voted into the finals on 18 May 2013. In the finals, the song placed 12th with 71 points.

== Background ==
On 16 December 2012, "Love Kills" was chosen as Belgium's Eurovision entry during a live radio show, aired on VivaCité. Co-writer Iain Farquharson wrote Azerbaijan's 2011 Eurovision winner, "Running Scared".

== Track listing ==
Digital download

1. "Love Kills" – 3:00

== Chart performance ==
| Chart (2013) | Peak position |
|---|---|
| Belgium (Ultratop 50 Flanders) | 15 |
| Belgium (Ultratop 50 Wallonia) | 6 |
| Germany (GfK) | 90 |
| Netherlands (Single Top 100) | 71 |
| Sweden (DigiListan) | 29 |
