= Knockout (Triple 8 song) =

2003 single by Triple 8

Single by Triple 8
- B-side: "Take Me Home"
- Released: 21 April 2003
- Recorded: 2003
- Genre: Pop rock, R&B, hip hop
- Length: 3:22
- Label: Universal/Polydor
- Songwriters: Anders Bagge; Peer Astrom; Reed Verteleney; Wayne Hector; Michael Berg Andersson
- Producer: Anders Bagge

Triple 8 singles chronology
"Knockout" (2003)	"Give Me a Reason" (2003)

Audio sample
- file; help

"Knockout" is the debut single recorded by the British pop/rock group Triple 8, released on 21 April 2003 in the United Kingdom. The single reached a peak position of number 8 on the UK Singles Chart.

== Track listing ==
CD 1

1. "Knockout" 3:22
2. "Take Me Home" 3:31
3. "Knockout" (8 Jam 'Knock You Out' mix) 4:19
4. "Knockout" (Video)

CD 2

1. "Knockout" 3:23
2. "I Don't Wanna Lose Ya" 3:10
3. "Knockout" (Tom Mandolini vocal mix) 6:36

== Charts ==
Chart (2003)	Peak Position
UK Singles (The Official Charts Company)	8

== Super Junior version ==
"Twins (Knock Out)"

Single by Super Junior 05

from the album Twins
- Released: 11 November 2005
- Recorded: 2005
- Studio: SM Booming System; SM Yellow Tail Studio
- Genre: Pop rock; R&B
- Length: 3:21
- Label: SM
- Composers: Anders Bagge; Peer Astrom; Reed Verteleney; Wayne Hector; Michael Berg Andersson; Yoo Young-jin
- Lyricist: Yoo Young-jin
- Producers: Lee Soo-man; Yoo Young-jin

Super Junior 05 singles chronology
"Twins (Knock Out)" (2005)	"Show Me Your Love" (2005)

Audio sample
- file; help

"Twins (Knock Out)" is the debut single by Super Junior, when they were still known as Super Junior 05, which was released online as a digital single on 11 November 2005, and later on the group's first studio album, Twins on 5 December 2005.

Before the single was released for download, Super Junior 05 made their debut as a group on SBS's Popular Songs on November 6, 2005, performing "Twins (Knock Out)".

=== Background ===
Super Junior 05's cover version kept the original song's hip-hop influence but incorporated heavier bass elements and quicker rap, forming the song into a rap rock piece. The promotional title of the song, "Twins", was added to the song's title to mark the change in lyrics from the original song. The Korean lyrics, written by Yoo Young-jin, speaks of self-deception and the indecisive aspects of mind, contrasting the feelings between a man towards love and how he has to decide whether or not he should continue to love or fight with sticking to his own destiny.

=== Music video ===
The music video was filmed in a dance studio. A majority of the scenes are simply dancing footage, where the members are surrounded by fire and also the contrast, blue sky.

Similar to the lyrics and music style of the song, the choreography displayed for the music video contains quick and tough body movements. The snatching movements of the wrist, elbow, and any other joint on the arms and legs are richly used in a form of a robot. Other hip hop movements, such as popping and locking, are also commonly used. Unlike Super Junior's other dances, sliding, waving, and other smooth movements are rarely used in the dance choreography. It is said that the movements of a flying eagle was an inspiration to the choreography, such as in the beginning of the dance and in the dance bridge towards the middle of the song, where their dance forms takes shape of an eagle.

=== Track listing ===
1. "차근차근 (Way for Love)" — 3:17 ("Carefully (Way for Love)")
2. "Twins (Knock Out)" — 3:21
3. "You Are the One" — 3:52
4. "Over" — 3:16
5. "L.O.V.E." — 3:37
6. "Twins (Knock Out)" (Instrumental) — 3:20

=== Credits and personnel ===
Credits adapted from the album's liner notes.

Studio

- SM Booming System – recording, mixing
- SM Yellow Tail Studio – recording
- Sonic Korea – mastering

Personnel

- SM Entertainment – executive producer
- Lee Soo-man – producer
- Super Junior – vocals, background vocals
- Yoo Young-jin – producer, lyrics, vocal directing, background vocals, recording, mixing
- Peer Astrom – composition
- Anders Bagge – composition
- Reed Verteleney – composition
- Wayne Hector – composition
- Michael Berg Andersson – composition
- Yoo Han-jin – arrangement, recording assistant
- Kim Hyun-ah – background vocals
- Groovie K – guitar
- Lee Seong-ho – recording
- Jeon Hoon – mastering

== Other cover versions ==
Taiwanese boy band Energy soon released a Chinese remake of the song several months later as "Retreating Dark Files" (退魔錄). Unlike the original song which was a hip hop-influenced pop single, "Retreating Dark Files" is more rock influenced.
