= Ma voie =

Studio album by Roberto Bellarosa
- Released: September 21, 2012
- Recorded: 2012
- Genre: Pop
- Label: Sony Music Entertainment

Singles from Ma voie
- 1. "Jealous Guy" Released: April 4, 2012; 2. "Je Crois" Released: July 6, 2012; 3. "Apprends-moi" Released: October 26, 2012

Ma voie (My Way) is the debut studio album by Belgian singer of Italian origin, Roberto Bellarosa. It was released on the September 21, 2012. The album reached number 11 in Belgium. The album includes the singles "Jealous Guy", "Je Crois" and "Apprends-moi".

== Singles ==
- "Jealous Guy" was the first single to be released from the album on April 4, 2012.
- "Je Crois" was the second single released from the album on July 6, 2012.
- "Apprends-moi" was the third single released from the album on October 26, 2012.

== Track listing ==
No.	Title	Length
1.	"Je Crois"	2:57
2.	"Mon âge"	3:00
3.	"L'enfance"	3:19
4.	"Reste toi"	3:17
5.	"Voyou"	3:27
6.	"Sans toi"	3:11
7.	"Apprends-moi"	3:41
8.	"Un homme"	2:59
9.	"Le coup de soleil"	4:09
10.	"Le plus beau des cadeaux"	3:50
11.	"Jealous Guy"	2:51

== Chart performance ==
Chart (2012)	Peak position
Belgian Albums Chart (Wallonia)	11

== Release history ==
Region	Date	Format	Label
Belgium	September 21, 2012	Digital download	Sony Music Entertainment
