= Roberto Bellarosa =

Belgian singer

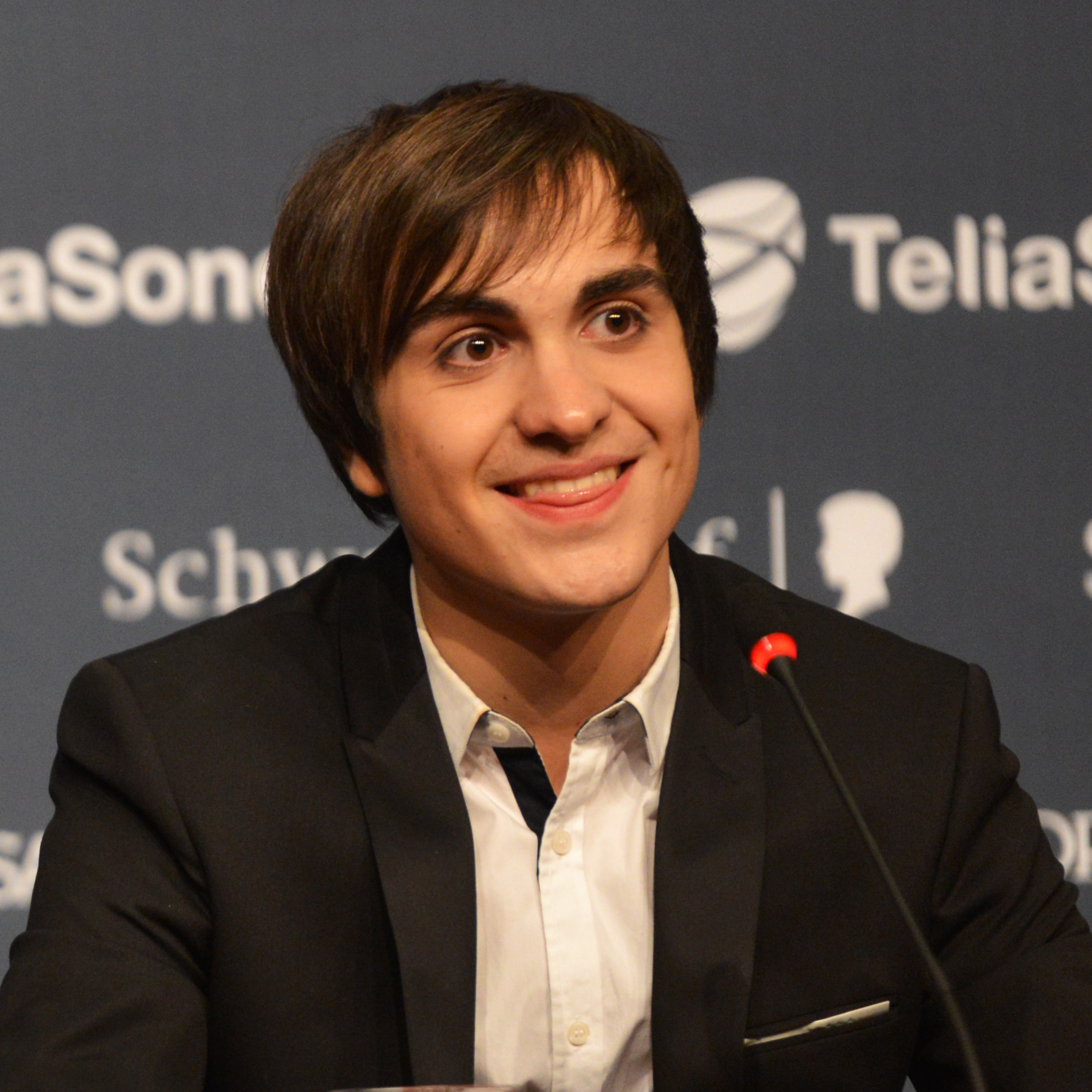
- Bellarosa in 2013

Background information
- Born: 23 August 1994 (age 32); Wanze, Belgium
- Genres: Pop
- Years active: 2012–present
- Label: Sony Music Entertainment

Roberto Bellarosa (born 23 August 1994) is a Belgian singer. Bellarosa came to fame for being the first winner of The Voice Belgique. He also represented Belgium in the Eurovision Song Contest 2013, finishing in 12th place with 71 points.

== Biography ==
He was born in Wanze into a family of footballers of Italian origin from Vico del Gargano, in the southern region of Apulia. At the age of nine, Bellarosa was enrolled by his parents at a school of music in Huy. During choral classes, his teacher was impressed by his voice, and his parents encouraged the young Bellarosa to take extra singing lessons.

== Career ==
=== 2011–12: The Voice Belgique ===
In 2011, Bellarosa took part in the Walloon version of The Voice (The Voice Belgique), created by John de Mol.

After applying online, Bellarosa attended the blind auditions, where he sang "You Give Me Something" by James Morrison. With Quentin Mosimann, Lio, Joshua and Beverly Jo Scott, all turning their chairs to face him, Bellarosa ultimately decided to join Quentin Mosimann's team with assistant coach Tara McDonald.

On 10 April 2012, after 16 weeks of competition, Bellarosa was voted the winner gaining 57% of the votes from the public, receiving a contract with Sony Music, which he recorded an album along with two singles.

==== List of songs performed on The Voice Belgique ====
Stage	Date	Song	Original artist	Notes
Blind auditions	3 January 2012	"You Give Me Something"	James Morrison	
Battle	31 January 2012	"Même Si"	Grégory Lemarchal & Lucie Silvas	Duel won against Daniela Sindaco
Live	28 February 2012	"Apologize"	OneRepublic	
Live	13 March 2012	"Wicked Game"	Chris Isaak	
Live	27 March 2012	"Le blues du businessman"	Claude Dubois	
Live	3 April 2012	"Just the Two of Us"	Bill Withers	Duo with Leonie W'asukulu
Live	3 April 2012	"As"	Stevie Wonder	
Live	10 April 2012	"Firework"	Katy Perry	With Renato Bennardo, Giusy Piccarreta, and Daisy Hermans
Live	10 April 2012	"You Give Me Something"	James Morrison	
Live	10 April 2012	"Vivre pour le meilleur"	Johnny Hallyday	
Live	10 April 2012	"Jealous Guy"	John Lennon	Winner

=== 2012–13: Ma voie and Eurovision Song Contest ===
In 2012, Bellarosa participated in The Voice Belgique live tour along with 11 of the other contestants throughout Belgium. On 6 July 2012, Bellarosa released his first single "Je Crois", working with his The Voice Belgique coach, Quentin Mosimann and assistant coach Tara McDonald. His first album Ma voie was released on 21 September 2012, and his second single "Apprends-moi" was released on 26 October 2012.

On 16 November 2012, it was announced by Radio Télévision Belge Francophone (RTBF), that Bellarosa would represent Belgium at the Eurovision Song Contest 2013, to be held in Malmö, Sweden, with the song Love Kills. He made it into the final and finished at the 12th place.

== Discography ==
=== Albums ===
Title	Album details	Peak chart positions
Title	Album details	BEL (WAL)
Ma voie	Released: 21 September 2012; Label: Sony Music Entertainment; Format: Digital download, CD	11
Suis ta route	Released: 2015	

=== Singles ===
Year	Song	Peak chart position				Album
Year	Song	BEL (VL)	BEL (WAL)	GER	NL	Album
2012	"Jealous Guy"	–	4	–	–	Ma Voie
2012	"Je Crois"	–	37	–	–	Ma Voie
2012	"Apprends-moi"	–	– (Note: "Apprends-Moi" did not enter the Ultratop 40, but peaked at number 19 on the Wallione Ultratip chart.)	–	–	Ma Voie
2013	"Love Kills"	15	6	90	71	
2021	"Le Remede"	–	–	–	–	
"–" denotes single that did not chart or was not released.

=== Other charted songs ===
Year	Song	Peak chart positions	Album
Year	Song	BEL (WAL)	Album
2012	"Apologize"	3	The Voice Belgique Live Show 1

== Notes ==
Awards and achievements
Preceded by N/A	The Voice Belgique winner 2011-12	Succeeded by David Madi
Preceded by Iris with "Would You?"	Belgium in the Eurovision Song Contest; 2013	Succeeded by Axel Hirsoux with "Mother"
