= Taio Cruz discography =

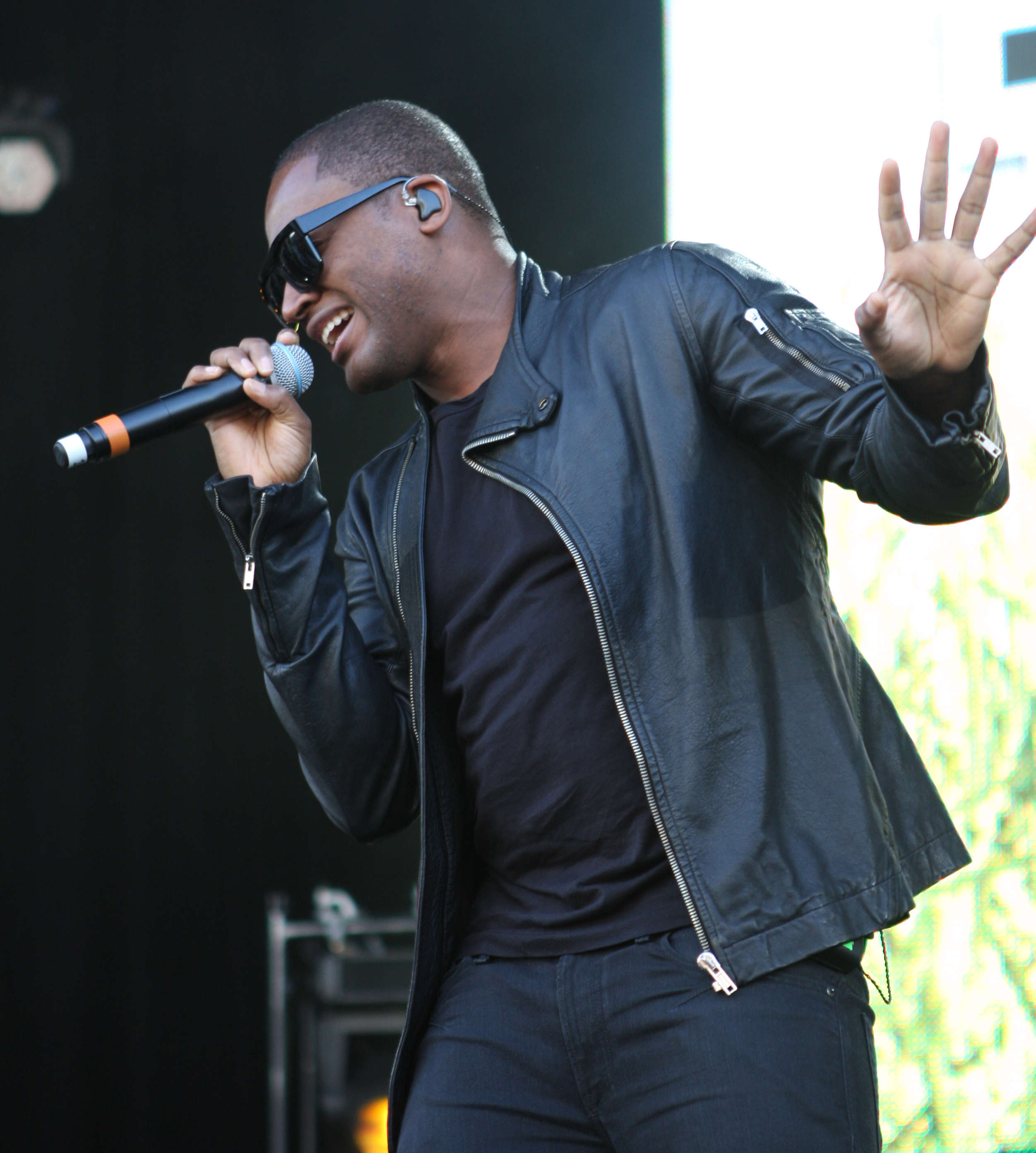
- Taio Cruz performing at the music festival Supafest in Australia, April 2011
- Studio albums: 3
- Extended plays: 1
- Live albums: 1
- Compilation albums: 1
- Singles: 23
- Music videos: 23

English singer Taio Cruz has released three studio albums, one compilation album, one live album, one extended play, twenty singles (including six as a featured artist) and twenty-three music videos. After signing a publishing deal at the age of 19, Cruz released his debut studio album, Departure in 2006; it reached number 17 on the UK Albums Chart and was certified gold by the British Phonographic Industry (BPI). The album contained five singles, all of which reached the top 30 of the UK Singles Chart: "Come On Girl", which peaked at number five, was the most successful of these singles.

Cruz released his second album, Rokstarr, on 12 October 2009, preceded by the commercially successful single "Break Your Heart". It became his first single to top the UK Singles Chart, whilst a remixed version featuring vocals from American rapper Ludacris topped the Canadian and Swiss singles charts as well as the US Billboard Hot 100. Rokstarr also featured the singles "No Other One", "Dirty Picture", "Dynamite", "Higher" and "Falling in Love". "Dynamite" topped the British and American singles charts, and was later certified sextuple platinum by the Recording Industry Association of America (RIAA).

In 2011, Cruz collaborated with French house musician David Guetta and Ludacris on the single "Little Bad Girl": it reached number four in the United Kingdom and number five in Austria and Germany. Cruz's third album, TY.O was also released in 2011, from which five singles were released: "Hangover", "Troublemaker", "There She Goes", "World in Our Hands" and "Fast Car". "Hangover" reached number one in Austria and Switzerland, and "Troublemaker" charted at number three in the United Kingdom.

== Albums ==
=== Studio albums ===
Title	Details	Peak chart positions										Sales	Certifications
Title	Details	UK	AUS	AUT	CAN	FRA	GER	IRE	NL	SWI	US	Sales	Certifications
Departure	Released: 17 March 2008 (UK); Label: Mercury/IDJMG; Formats: CD, digital download	17	—	—	—	—	—	—	—	—	—		BPI: Gold
Rokstarr	Released: 12 October 2009 (UK); Label: Mercury / IDJMG; Formats: CD, digital download	14	14	36	3	20	31	24	95	37	8	US: 289,000	ARIA: Gold; BPI: Gold; BVMI: Gold; IFPI AUT: Gold; MC: Gold
TY.O	Released: 2 December 2011 (GER); Label: Mercury / IDJMG; Formats: CD, digital download	—	95	36	—	—	28	—	100	15	—		BVMI: Gold
"—" denotes an album that did not chart or was not released or was not released in that territory.

=== Compilation albums ===
Title	Details	Peak chart positions	Certifications
Title	Details	UK	Certifications
The Rokstarr Collection	Released: 20 September 2010 (UK); Label: Mercury / IDJMG; Formats: CD, digital download	16	BPI: Silver

=== Live albums ===
Title	Details
iTunes Session	Released: 4 January 2011 (US); Label: Mercury / IDJMG; Format: Digital download

== Extended plays ==
Title	Details
The Fast Hits	Released: 13 December 2012 (UK); Label: Mercury / IDJMG; Format: Digital download

== Singles ==
=== As lead artist ===
Title	Year	Peak chart positions										Certifications	Album
Title	Year	UK	AUS	AUT	CAN	GER	IRE	NL	NZ	SWI	US	Certifications	Album
"I Just Wanna Know"	2006	29	—	—	—	—	—	—	—	—	—		Departure
"Moving On"	2007	26	—	—	—	—	—	—	—	—	—		Departure
"Come On Girl" (featuring Luciana)	2008	5	—	—	—	—	19	—	—	—	—	BPI: Silver	Departure
"I Can Be"	2008	18	—	—	—	—	23	—	—	—	—		Departure
"She's like a Star"	2008	20	—	—	—	—	—	—	—	—	—	BPI: Silver	Departure
"Break Your Heart"^{[A]} (solo or featuring Ludacris)	2009	1	2	10	1	5	2	21	17	1	1	BPI: 2× Platinum; ARIA: 2× Platinum; BVMI: 2× Platinum; IFPI AUT: Gold; IFPI SWI: 2× Platinum; MC: 3× Platinum; RIAA: 3× Platinum; RMNZ: Platinum	Rokstarr
"No Other One"	2009	42	—	—	—	—	—	—	—	—	—		Rokstarr
"Dirty Picture" (featuring Kesha or Paulina Rubio)	2010	6	16	—	49	—	10	72	11	—	96	BPI: Silver; ARIA: Gold; RMNZ: Gold	Rokstarr
"Dynamite" (solo or featuring Jennifer Lopez)	2010	1	1	2	1	3	1	4	1	3	2	BPI: 3× Platinum; ARIA: 7× Platinum; BVMI: 5× Gold; IFPI AUT: Platinum; IFPI SWI: Platinum; MC: 5× Platinum; RIAA: 8× Platinum; RMNZ: 4× Platinum	Rokstarr
"Higher"^{[B]} (featuring Kylie Minogue or Kimberly Wyatt)	2010	8	25	3	13	3	7	15	5	4	24	BPI: Gold; ARIA: Gold; BVMI: Platinum; IFPI AUT: Platinum; IFPI SWI: Platinum; MC: Platinum; RIAA: Platinum; RMNZ: Gold	Rokstarr
"Telling the World"	2011	108	—	21	—	35	—	96	—	—	—		Rio soundtrack
"Falling in Love"	2011	—	—	—	—	—	—	—	—	—	—		Rokstarr
"Hangover" (featuring Flo Rida)	2011	27	3	1	13	2	22	12	10	1	62	BPI: Silver; ARIA: 4× Platinum; BVMI: 3× Platinum; IFPI AUT: 2× Platinum; IFPI SWI: 3× Platinum; RMNZ: Gold	TY.O
"Troublemaker"	2011	3	10	12	—	6	18	50	—	7	—	ARIA: Platinum; BVMI: Gold; IFPI SWI: Platinum	TY.O
"There She Goes"^{[C]} (featuring Pitbull)	2012	12	—	8	65	5	40	67	—	2	—	BVMI: 3× Gold; IFPI SWI: Gold	TY.O
"World in Our Hands"	2012	—	—	5	—	4	—	—	—	40	—	BVMI: Gold	TY.O
"Fast Car"	2012	180	28	34	—	39	—	—	—	—	—		TY.O
"Do What You Like"	2015	—	—	—	—	—	—	—	—	—	—		Non-album singles
"Booty Bounce" (with Tujamo)	2016	—	—	—	—	83	—	77	—	—	—		Non-album singles
"Row the Body" (featuring French Montana)	2017	—	—	—	—	—	—	—	—	—	—		Non-album singles
"Signs" (with Hugel)	2018	—	—	—	—	—	—	—	—	—	—		Non-album singles
"Me on You" (with Nicky Romero)	2018	—	—	—	—	—	—	—	—	—	—		Non-album singles
"Time for You" (featuring Wonder Stereo)	2019	—	—	—	—	—	—	—	—	—	—		Non-album singles
"—" denotes a single that did not chart or was not released or was not released in that territory.

=== As featured artist ===
Title	Year	Peak chart positions										Certifications	Album
Title	Year	UK	AUS	AUT	CAN	GER	IRE	NL	NZ	SWI	US	Certifications	Album
"Rainfall" (Nitin Sawhney featuring Taio Cruz)	2003	—	—	—	—	—	—	—	—	—	—		Human
"Take Me Back" (Tinchy Stryder featuring Taio Cruz)	2009	3	—	—	—	—	16	—	—	—	—	BPI: Silver	Catch 22
"Second Chance" (Tinchy Stryder featuring Taio Cruz)	2010	22	—	—	—	—	35	—	—	—	—		Third Strike
"Shine a Light" (McFly featuring Taio Cruz)	2010	4	—	—	—	—	13	—	—	—	—	BPI: Platinum	Above the Noise
"Cryin' Over You" (Nightcrawlers featuring Taio Cruz)	2011	—	—	—	—	—	—	—	—	—	—		Non-album single
"Little Bad Girl" (David Guetta featuring Taio Cruz and Ludacris)	2011	4	15	5	14	5	8	39	19	7	70	BPI: Gold; ARIA: Platinum; BVMI: Gold; IFPI AUT: Gold; IFPI SWI: Gold	Nothing but the Beat
"—" denotes a single that did not chart or was not released or was not released in that territory.

== Other appearances ==
Title	Year	Album
"Written in the Stars" (The Arcade Southside Remix) (Tinie Tempah featuring Taio Cruz)	2010	Disc-Overy
"Dirty Picture, Pt. 2" (Kesha featuring Taio Cruz)	2010	Animal

== Songwriting Credits ==
Year	Artist	Song	Album
2003	Will Young	"Your Game"	Friday's Child
2008	Danny Saucedo	"Set Your Body Free"	Set Your Body Free
2009	Tinchy Stryder	"Never Leave You" feat. Amelle Berrabah	Catch 22
2009	Cheryl	"Stand Up"	3 Words
2009	JLS	"Keep You"	JLS
2010	The Wanted	"Made"	The Wanted
2010	McFly	"Nowhere Left to Run"	Above the Noise
2011	Jennifer Lopez	"I'm Into You" feat. Lil Wayne	Love?
2011	David Guetta	"Without You" feat. Usher	Nothing but the Beat
2011	Rachael Lampa	"Run to You"	All We Need
2011	Keshia Chanté	"Set U Free"	Night & Day
2012	Cheryl	"Mechanics of The Heart"	A Million Lights
2012	Cody Simpson	"Wish U Were Here" feat. Becky G	Paradise
2012	Alex Gaudino	"I Don't Wanna Dance" feat. Taboo	Doctor Love
2014	Nick Jonas	"I Want You"	Nick Jonas
2015	Danny Mercer	"Who Are You Loving Now?"	Non-album single
2015	Olly Murs	"Kiss Me"	Never Been Better
2021	Paul Oakenfold	"I'm In Love" feat. Aloe Blacc	Non-album single
2025	Robyn	"Dopamine"	Sexistential
2026	MK	"I Can Be (Stronger)"	In The Night Again

== Music videos ==
Title	Year	Director(s)
As lead artist
"I Just Wanna Know"	2006	Andy Hylton
"Moving On"	2007	Shane Stirling
"Come on Girl" (featuring Luciana)	2008	Alex Herron
"I Can Be"	2008	Alex Herron
"She's like a Star"	2008	Alex Herron
"Break Your Heart"	2009	Alex Herron
"No Other One"	2009	Alex Herron
"Break Your Heart" (featuring Ludacris)	2009	Alex Herron, Taj
"Dirty Picture" (featuring Kesha)	2010	Alex Herron
"Dynamite"	2010	Alex Herron
"Higher" (featuring Kylie Minogue)	2010	Alex Herron
"Higher" (featuring Travie McCoy)	2010	Alex Herron
"Falling in Love"	2011	Phil Heyes
"Telling the World"	2011	Alex Herron
"Hangover" (featuring Flo Rida)	2012	Martin Weisz
"Troublemaker"	2012	Martin Weisz
"There She Goes"	2012	Alex Herron
"Fast Car"	2012	Colin Tilley
"Do What You Like"	2015	Ray Kay
"Booty Bounce" (with Tujamo)	2015	Ryan Staake
As featured artist
"Take Me Back" (Tinchy Stryder featuring Taio Cruz)	2009	Emil Nava
"Second Chance" (Tinchy Stryder featuring Taio Cruz)	2010	Emil Nava
"Shine a Light" (McFly featuring Taio Cruz)	2010	Phil Griffin
"Cryin' Over You" (Nightcrawlers featuring Taio Cruz)	2011	Alex Herron
"Little Bad Girl" (David Guetta featuring Taio Cruz and Ludacris)	2011	Dave Meyers

== Notes ==
- A The single version of "Break Your Heart" released in the United Kingdom does not feature Ludacris.
- B Three single versions of "Higher" were released: the first features Kylie Minogue, the second features Travie McCoy and the third features them both.
- C The single version of "There She Goes" released in the United Kingdom does not feature Pitbull.
