= The Rokstarr Collection =

Compilation album by Taio Cruz
- Released: 20 September 2010
- Recorded: 2009–2010
- Length: 54:06
- Label: Island
- Producer: Benny Blanco; Taio Cruz; Dr. Luke; Fraser T. Smith; Alan Nglish; Sandy Vee

Taio Cruz chronology
Rokstarr (2009)	The Rokstarr Collection (2010)	TY.O (2011)

The Rokstarr Collection (also sometimes called The Rokstarr Hits Collection) is the first compilation album by English R&B recording artist Taio Cruz. It was released on 20 September 2010. The album includes all of Cruz's singles from his first two studio albums, excluding "No Other One". The album also includes album tracks and the American version of "Break Your Heart", featuring Ludacris. Island Records added the video advertisement for the collection to their YouTube account on 18 August 2010.

The album was also a success on the charts of the Billboard Hot 100, Canadian Hot 100 and also reached the number-one spot on the Australian charts. On 26 September 2010, The Rokstarr Collection debuted at number 16 on the official UK Albums Chart, becoming Cruz's third consecutive top 20 album.

== Background ==
Speaking to Nesta McGregor of the BBC Newsbeat, Cruz admitted that releasing a greatest hits collection was "insane" after only having released two albums: "I've been so fortunate to release so many singles. I've got six singles off the first album and another five singles off this new album, so there's definitely a lot of records that people will have heard before but not necessarily known that it was me. But they liked the song."

== Critical reception ==
Professional ratings
Review scores
Source	Rating
AllMusic	3/5 stars

The Rokstarr Collection received a mixed reception from critics. Pip from Entertainment Focus gave the compilation a positive reception. Pip said "[the compilation] brings together the biggest smashes of Taio's career in one hit-packed album. The sheer weight of hits offers further proof that pound for pound, Taio Cruz is right up there as one of the handful of guaranteed hit maker/writer/artist/producers currently working in pop music." However, Ruth of Female First was less impressed, the review, she called the release "ambitious". She said that "although 'Dynamite' has shifted 1.5 million unites across the pond AND his debut US single 'Break Your Heart' has gone on to sell over 5 million worldwide, can anyone name five Taio Cruz tracks? Not only that, but the CD only has 15 songs on there, one which is on TWICE… come on Taio, who are you trying to kid?"

== Track listing ==
The Rokstarr Collection
No.	Title	Writer(s)	Producer(s)	Length
1.	"Dynamite"	Taio Cruz; Lukasz "Dr. Luke" Gottwald; Max Martin; Benjamin "Benny Blanco" Levin; Bonnie McKee	Dr. Luke; Benny Blanco	3:23
2.	"Break Your Heart"	Cruz; Fraser T. Smith	Smith	3:22
3.	"Dirty Picture" (featuring Kesha)	Cruz; Kesha Sebert; Gottwald; Levin; Smith	Cruz; Smith	3:39
4.	"Take Me Back" (featuring Tinchy Stryder)	Cruz; Kwasi Danquah; Smith	Smith	3:27
5.	"Come On Girl" (featuring Luciana)	Cruz; Luciana; Nicholas Clow	Cruz	3:33
6.	"Forever Love"	Cruz	Cruz	4:12
7.	"She's Like a Star"	Cruz	Cruz	3:38
8.	"I Just Wanna Know"	Cruz	Cruz	3:58
9.	"I'll Never Love Again"	Cruz	Cruz	3:48
10.	"Falling in Love"	Cruz; Alan Kasirye	Cruz; Alan Nglish	3:31
11.	"I Can Be"	Cruz	Cruz	3:46
12.	"Higher"	Cruz; Sandy "Sandy Vee" Wilhelm	Cruz; Sandy Vee	3:08
13.	"Moving On"	Cruz	Cruz	3:52
14.	"Feel Again" (remastered 2010 edit)	Cruz; Kasirye	Cruz; Nglish	3:37
15.	"Break Your Heart" (featuring Ludacris)	Cruz; Smith; Christopher Bridges	Smith	3:05
Total length:				54:06

The Rokstarr Collection — Digital Deluxe DVD
No.	Title	Length
16.	"Dynamite" (Arcade Dance Mix)	5:43
17.	"Dynamite" (Video)
18.	"Break Your Heart" (Video)
19.	"Dirty Picture" (Video)
20.	"Take Me Back" (Video)
21.	"Come On Girl" (Video)
22.	"She's Like a Star" (Video)
23.	"I Just Wanna Know" (Video)
24.	"I Can Be" (Video)
25.	"Moving On" (Video)

== Charts ==
Chart (2010)	Peak position
Scottish Albums (OCC)	20
UK Albums (OCC)	16
UK R&B Albums (OCC)	2

== Certifications ==
Region	Certification	Certified units/sales
United Kingdom (BPI)	Gold	100,000^{^}
^{^} Shipments figures based on certification alone.

== Release history ==
Region	Release date	Format	Label
United Kingdom	20 September 2010	CD, digital download	Island Records
