= Rokstarr =

Studio album by Taio Cruz
- Released: 12 October 2009
- Genre: Pop; R&B
- Length: 44:00
- Label: Island
- Producer: Taio Cruz; Fraser T Smith; Dr. Luke; the Arcade; Alan Nglish; Benny Blanco; Sandy Vee

Taio Cruz chronology
Departure (2008)	Rokstarr (2009)	The Rokstarr Collection (2010)

Singles from Rokstarr
- 1. "Break Your Heart" Released: 13 September 2009; 2. "No Other One" Released: 30 November 2009; 3. "Dirty Picture" Released: 5 April 2010; 4. "Dynamite" Released: 1 June 2010; 5. "Higher" Released: 26 November 2010

Rokstarr is the second studio album by English singer and songwriter Taio Cruz. It was released on 12 October 2009 in the United Kingdom. On 11 June 2010, a revised version of the album was released in Europe and the United States, appearing as Cruz's debut album there. On 22 May 2011, a second revised version of the album was released in Brazil, other South American countries and Europe. The album debuted at number 14 on the UK Albums Chart and number eight on the US Billboard 200.

== Background ==
Speaking to Pete Lewis of the Blues & Soul, Cruz explained the musical background behind the album: "This album shows quite a bit of scope. In that, while it's still got underlining hip hop, dance and R&B-type tones to it, it also has like rocky and indie rock elements. And lyrically, because essentially I come from a ballad place of listening to people like Boyz II Men and Babyface, many of the songs do tend to be about relationships in one way or another. But the difference this time is that, as well as the full-on love songs, I am having a little bit more FUN with it all!"

== Critical reception ==
Professional ratings
Review scores
Source	Rating
AllMusic	3/5 stars
BBC	(favourable)
The Boston Globe	(positive)
Digital Spy	3/5 stars
Entertainment Weekly	B−
NME	2/5 stars
Rolling Stone	(mixed)
The Guardian	3/5 stars
The New York Times	(favorable)
Billboard	3.5/5 stars

The album has received generally mixed to positive reviews from critics. At Metacritic, which assigns a normalised rating out of 100 to reviews from mainstream critics, the album received an average score of 61, based on 11 reviews, which indicates "generally favorable reviews". Mike Driver of the BBC praised the album saying, "Rokstarr bounces to a beat that feels fresh and vibrant". Ken Capobianco of The Boston Globe remarked Rokstarr is "an agreeable, singles-going-steady kind of collection that should make for endless radio fodder." Jon Pareles of The New York Times claimed, "There are vapid lyrics to navigate ("Hit the floor 'cause that's my plans plans plans plans/I'm wearing all my favorite brands brands brands brands," on "Dynamite"), but they don't disrupt the mood, which is emphatic and rarely sensual: turns out Mr. Cruz has no off switch.". Brad Wete of Entertainment Weekly opined that "The only song of equal caliber to "Break Your Heart" on his Stateside debut is the Ke$ha-assisted sexting number "Dirty Picture". The rest of the tracks are forgettable and include a cut for throwing hands in the air ("Dynamite") and one awkwardly placed effort to uplift ("I Can Be")."

Jody Rosen of Rolling Stone bluntly wrote "Cruz's singing lacks personality, and Rokstarr is ultimately a collection of decent, but generic, Eurodisco tracks without a star--"rok" or otherwise—to hold a listener's interest." Emily Mackay of NME declared, "Although Cruz's downfall comes when he acts the player ('Break Your Heart', 'Dirty Picture'), it's obvious his real talent comes when he exchanges vocal manipulation for balladeering as on 'Falling in Love', and disregards romantic cynicism for a rather hopeful 'The 11th Hour'." David Jeffres from Allmusic in a 3/5 stars review found, "The hooks are plentiful on Rokstarr and infectious as they come. while as a producer Cruz is the Akon-meets-will.i.am-meets- Xenomania package that radio and record labels have dreamed about. Sounds good, and the album does the whole way through, but lyrics are a sore point and when ballads appear to help round out the effort, just help emphasize how his words are trite. Still, when you let the clichés fade into the background this is a master class in what the mainstream wants for a soundtrack in 2010".

== Commercial performance ==
The album debuted at number 8 on the Billboard 200, with sales of 24,000 copies. In its second week, the album tumbled to number 50, with sales of just 9,000 copies. It dropped to number 101 on its third week.

== Singles ==
- "Take Me Back", although not officially a single from Rokstarr, was included on the album. The track, featuring Tinchy Stryder, was released as a single from his album, Catch 22, peaking at number 3 on the UK Singles Chart.
- "Break Your Heart" was released as the first single from the album. It spent three weeks at the top of the UK Singles Chart. For its release in America, it was remixed to feature American rapper Ludacris and peaked at number one on the U.S. Billboard Hot 100 where it remained top of the charts for one week.
- "No Other One" was the second single released from the album. It was met by mixed to negative reviews from critics. It failed to meet the expectations or success of the previous single. It was only released in the UK. It reached number 42 on the UK Singles Chart and number 16 on the UK R&B Chart.
- "Dirty Picture", featuring American electropop singer Kesha, was announced as the album's third single. It was released in April 2010 in Australia, and in May 2010 in the UK. It peaked at number six in the UK and number ten in Ireland. It reached number 16 in Australia and number 12 in New Zealand. The song debuted at number 96 in the U.S. Billboard Hot 100 without an official release, due to strong digital downloads following the album's U.S. release. It was sent to Top 40 and Rhythmic radio as the third U.S. single on 28 September 2010.
- "Dynamite" was released as the album's fourth single overall, and the first single from the revised version of the album. The song debuted at number 26 on the Billboard Hot 100 before peaking at number two, becoming Cruz's second U.S. hit single. It also topped Australian ARIA Chart. It peaked at number 1 on the UK Singles Chart.
- "Higher" was released as the album's fifth single overall, and the second single from the revised version of the album. There are four versions of the song – a solo version by Cruz, a version featuring Travie McCoy, a version featuring Kylie Minogue, and a version with both McCoy and Minogue. The McCoy version was released in the US, while the Minogue version was released in Europe and Australia, and the version with both was released in the UK. The McCoy version was sent to U.S. radio on 30 November 2010.
- "Telling the World" was released as the sixth overall single from the album, and the first single from the second revised version of the album. It was the lead single from the soundtrack to the animated film Rio, and peaked at number 138 on the UK Singles Chart.
- "Falling in Love" was released as the seventh overall single from the album, and the second single from the second revised edition of the album. It was only released as a single in some countries, including Spain. A music video was released on 18 February 2011.

== Track listing ==
Rokstarr original version track listing
No.	Title	Writer(s)	Producer(s)	Length
1.	"Break Your Heart"	Cruz, Fraser T Smith	Taio Cruz, Fraser T Smith	3:22
2.	"Dirty Picture" (featuring Kesha)	Cruz, Smith	Taio Cruz, Fraser T Smith	3:41
3.	"No Other One"	Cruz, Smith	Taio Cruz, Fraser T Smith	3:38
4.	"Forever Love"	Taio Cruz	Fraser T Smith	4:12
5.	"Take Me Back" (featuring Tinchy Stryder; Version A^)	Cruz	Fraser T. Smith	3:34
6.	"Best Girl"	Cruz, The Arcade	Taio Cruz, The Arcade	4:09
7.	"I'll Never Love Again"	Cruz	Taio Cruz	3:49
8.	"Only You"	Cruz, Smith	Taio Cruz, Fraser T Smith	3:42
9.	"Falling in Love"	Cruz, Alan Kasirye	Taio Cruz, Alan Nglish	3:31
10.	"Keep Going"	Taio Cruz	Sandy Vee, Taio Cruz	3:28
11.	"Feel Again"	Cruz	Taio Cruz, Alan Nglish	3:40
12.	"The 11th Hour"	Cruz	Taio Cruz	3:36

Digital deluxe edition bonus tracks
No.	Title	Length
13.	"Falling in Love" (acoustic version)	3:11
14.	"Come On Girl" (live from iTunes London Festival '08)	3:44
15.	"I Can Be" (live from iTunes London Festival '08)	4:08
16.	"I Just Wanna Know" (live from iTunes London Festival '08)	4:04
17.	"Moving On" (live from iTunes London Festival '08)	3:40
18.	"She's Like a Star" (live from iTunes London Festival '08)	3:44

Redone edition (September 2010)
No.	Title	Writer(s)	Producer(s)	Length
1.	"Dynamite"	Taio Cruz, Lukasz Gottwald, Max Martin, Benjamin Levin, Bonnie McKee	Dr. Luke, Benny Blanco	3:24
2.	"Break Your Heart" (featuring Ludacris)	Taio Cruz, Fraser T Smith, Christopher Bridges	Taio Cruz, Fraser T Smith	3:06
3.	"Dirty Picture" (featuring Ke$ha)	Cruz, Smith	Taio Cruz, Fraser T Smith	3:39
4.	"Take Me Back" (Version C^^)	Kwasi Danquah, Smith, Cruz	Fraser T Smith	3:12
5.	"I'll Never Love Again"	Taio Cruz	Taio Cruz	3:49
6.	"I Can Be"	Cruz	Taio Cruz	3:47
7.	"No Other One"	Cruz, Smith	Taio Cruz, Fraser T Smith	3:37
8.	"Come On Girl" (featuring Luciana)	Cruz	Taio Cruz	3:33
9.	"Falling in Love"	Cruz, Alan Kasirye	Taio Cruz, Alan English	3:32
10.	"Higher"	Cruz, Sandy Vee	Sandy Vee, Taio Cruz	3:08
11.	"Feel Again"	Cruz	Taio Cruz, Alan English	3:39

iTunes Store deluxe edition bonus tracks
No.	Title	Length
12.	"Dirty Picture" (featuring Kesha and Fabolous)	3:40
13.	"Break Your Heart" (featuring Ludacris; Mixin Marc & Tony Svejda Remix)	3:48
14.	"Forever Love" (non-North American edition)	4:12

American bonus track
No.	Title	Writer(s)	Producer(s)	Length
12.	"Higher" (featuring Travie McCoy)	Cruz, Sandy Vee	Sandy Vee, Taio Cruz	3:38

Spanish bonus track
No.	Title	Length
12.	"Dirty Picture" (Spanish version; featuring Paulina Rubio)	3:39

Australian bonus tracks
No.	Title	Writer(s)	Producer(s)	Length
10.	"Higher" (featuring Kylie Minogue)			3:07
11.	"Feel Again"	Cruz	Taio Cruz, Alan English	3:39

International special edition bonus tracks
No.	Title	Length
12.	"She's Like a Star"	3:38
13.	"I Just Wanna Know"	3:58
14.	"Forever Love"	4:12

Brazilian edition
No.	Title	Writer(s)	Producer(s)	Length
12.	"She's Like a Star"			3:38
13.	"I Just Wanna Know"			3:58
14.	"Forever Love"			4:12
15.	"Higher" (featuring Travie McCoy)			3:38
16.	"Break Your Heart" (Agent X Remix)			5:42
17.	"Dynamite" (Ralphi Rosario Radio Edit)			3:39
18.	"Higher" (Club Junkies Radio Edit)			3:17
19.	"Dirty Picture" (Redtop Radio Edit)			3:24
20.	"Telling the World"	Taio Cruz, Alan Kasirye	Taio Cruz	4:09

Notes

^ Version A is the main version of the song, which was released as a single, and included on Stryder's album Catch 22. It features three rap verses by Stryder and the hook and chorus by Cruz.
^^ Version C is a solo version of the song, which replaces Stryder's rap verses with sung verses by Cruz. This version does not feature any vocals from Stryder.

== Charts and certifications ==
=== Weekly charts ===
Weekly chart performance for Rokstarr
Chart (2009–2010)	Peak position
Australian Albums (ARIA)	14
Austrian Albums (Ö3 Austria)	36
Belgian Albums (Ultratop Flanders)	45
Belgian Albums (Ultratop Wallonia)	93
Canadian Albums (Billboard)	3
Danish Albums (Hitlisten)	36
Dutch Albums (Album Top 100)	95
French Albums (SNEP)	20
German Albums (Offizielle Top 100)	31
Greek Albums (IFPI)	24
Irish Albums (IRMA)	24
Mexican Albums (Top 100 Mexico)	77
Swiss Albums (Schweizer Hitparade)	39
UK Albums (OCC)	14
US Billboard 200	8

=== Year-end charts ===
Year-end chart performance for Rokstarr
Chart (2010)	Position
Australian Albums (ARIA)	85
French Albums (SNEP)	195

=== Certifications ===
Certifications for Rokstarr
Region	Certification	Certified units/sales
Australia (ARIA)	Gold	35,000^{^}
Austria (IFPI Austria)	Gold	10,000^{*}
Canada (Music Canada)	Gold	40,000^{^}
Germany (BVMI)	Gold	100,000^{‡}
Singapore (RIAS)	Gold	5,000^{*}
United Kingdom (BPI)	Gold	100,000^{‡}
^{*} Sales figures based on certification alone.^{^} Shipments figures based on certification alone.^{‡} Sales+streaming figures based on certification alone.

== Release history ==
Release history and formats for Rokstarr
Region	Release date	Format	Label
United Kingdom	12 October 2009	CD, digital download (original edition)	Island
Poland	7 May 2010	CD, digital download (original edition)	Universal Music
United States	1 June 2010	CD, digital download (revised edition)	Mercury
Canada	1 June 2010	CD, digital download (revised edition)	Universal Music
Brazil	7 June 2010	CD, digital download (revised edition)	Universal Music
Australia	16 July 2010	CD, digital download (revised edition)	Island
Europe	19 November 2010	CD, digital download (revised edition)	Island
Brazil	1 April 2011	CD, digital download (second revised edition)	Universal Music
