= She's like a Star =

Single by Taio Cruz

from the album Departure
- Released: 18 August 2008
- Recorded: 2007
- Studio: Gangsta Records
- Genre: R&B
- Length: 3:17 (Radio Edit); 3:38 (Album Version)
- Label: Island Records
- Songwriter: Taio Cruz
- Producer: Taio Cruz

Taio Cruz singles chronology
| "I Can Be" (2008) | "She's like a Star" (2008) | "I Just Wanna Know '08" (2008) |

Sugababes singles chronology
| "Denial" (2008) | "She's like a Star" (2008) | "Girls" (2008) |

Busta Rhymes singles chronology
| "Peace Sign/Index Down" (2008) | "She's like a Star" (2008) | "Arab Money" (2008) |

Music video
- "She's like a Star" on YouTube

"She's like a Star" is a song written, produced and performed by British singer and songwriter Taio Cruz. It was released on 18 August 2008 as the fifth single from his debut studio album Departure (2008). An R&B ballad, the lyrics of "She's like a Star" are about the theme of parenthood, an idea which inspired Cruz to compose the song. The song was remixed to feature vocals from English girl group Sugababes and American rapper Busta Rhymes. Another remix features rapper K.R. "She's like a Star" received generally mixed reviews from critics, who were ambivalent towards the composition. Upon release, it peaked at number twenty on the UK Singles Chart. The song's music video features Hollyoaks actress Roxanne McKee as Cruz's love interest. Cruz performed the song with the Sugababes at the 2008 MOBO Awards ceremony, and at Radio 1's Big Weekend 2011.

== Background and composition ==
"She's Like a Star" was written and produced by Taio Cruz for his debut studio album Departure (2008). He composed the song in the middle of 2007, towards the completion of the album's recording, and was inspired to write it based on the idea of parenthood. During an interview with Sugar, Cruz explained that the song has a double meaning behind it:

It's about my girlfriend but it's also about how you would feel if you had a child and how strongly you would feel if you had a daughter and how overwhelming the love would be and they would kind of be like a star, you know like she’s my everything, she’s an angel.

"She's like a Star" is an R&B ballad, and according to the digital sheet music published by Hal Leonard Publishing, was composed in the key of C major at a tempo of 100 beats per minute. It contains synthesizers and uses a sample of a child's voice in the vocal "Like a star", which is repeated several times throughout the song. According to Jon O'Brien of AllMusic, the song is reminiscent of American rapper Kanye West's older material. British soul singer Corinne Bailey Rae claimed that Cruz sampled her voice with her song "Like a Star". Cruz denied the accusation and stated that a musicologist was able to prove that he did not sample Rae's voice.

== Release and reception ==
"She's like a Star" is the fifth single from Departure, and was released in the United Kingdom on 18 August 2008. There are several remixes of the song, including one by Cahill which is more uptempo than the original version. A remix that features vocals from English girl group Sugababes and American rapper Busta Rhymes was also released. According to the Daily Mirror, the collaboration came about when they ran into each other at the Hot 97 studios in New York City. A version of the remix without Busta Rhymes appears as a bonus track on the Sugababes' sixth studio album Catfights and Spotlights (2008).

=== Critical response ===
Alex Fletcher of Digital Spy rated the song three out of five stars and stated that it is "undoubtedly" one of the album's low points. Additionally, he criticised the song's lack of "bravado and pizazz" in comparison to Cruz's previous singles "I Can Be" and "Come On Girl". Andy Welch of the Halesowen News described it as "a fine example of a Brit doing R&B as well as the Americans", but was unimpressed with the child's voice sample. Hazel Robinson from the BBC Chart Blog gave the song a full five-star rating, and wrote that its composition and musical arrangement produced a song that sounds natural and "pretty extraordinary". The reviewer admitted that while "She's like a Star" was not the best track from Departure, it sounds "infinitely cooler" than the album's previous single "I Can Be". Daily Record's Rick Fulton praised "She's like a Star" as "one of the best R&B sounds to come out of the UK". "She's like a Star" earned Cruz a MOBO Award nomination for Best UK Male.

=== Chart performance ===
The song debuted at number 44 on the UK Singles Chart in the issue dated 16 August 2008. It peaked at number 20 three weeks later, and spent a total of 15 weeks on the chart. "She's like a Star" became Cruz's fifth consecutive top-thirty hit in the United Kingdom, and outpeaked the album's first two singles "I Just Wanna Know" and "Moving On".

== Promotion ==
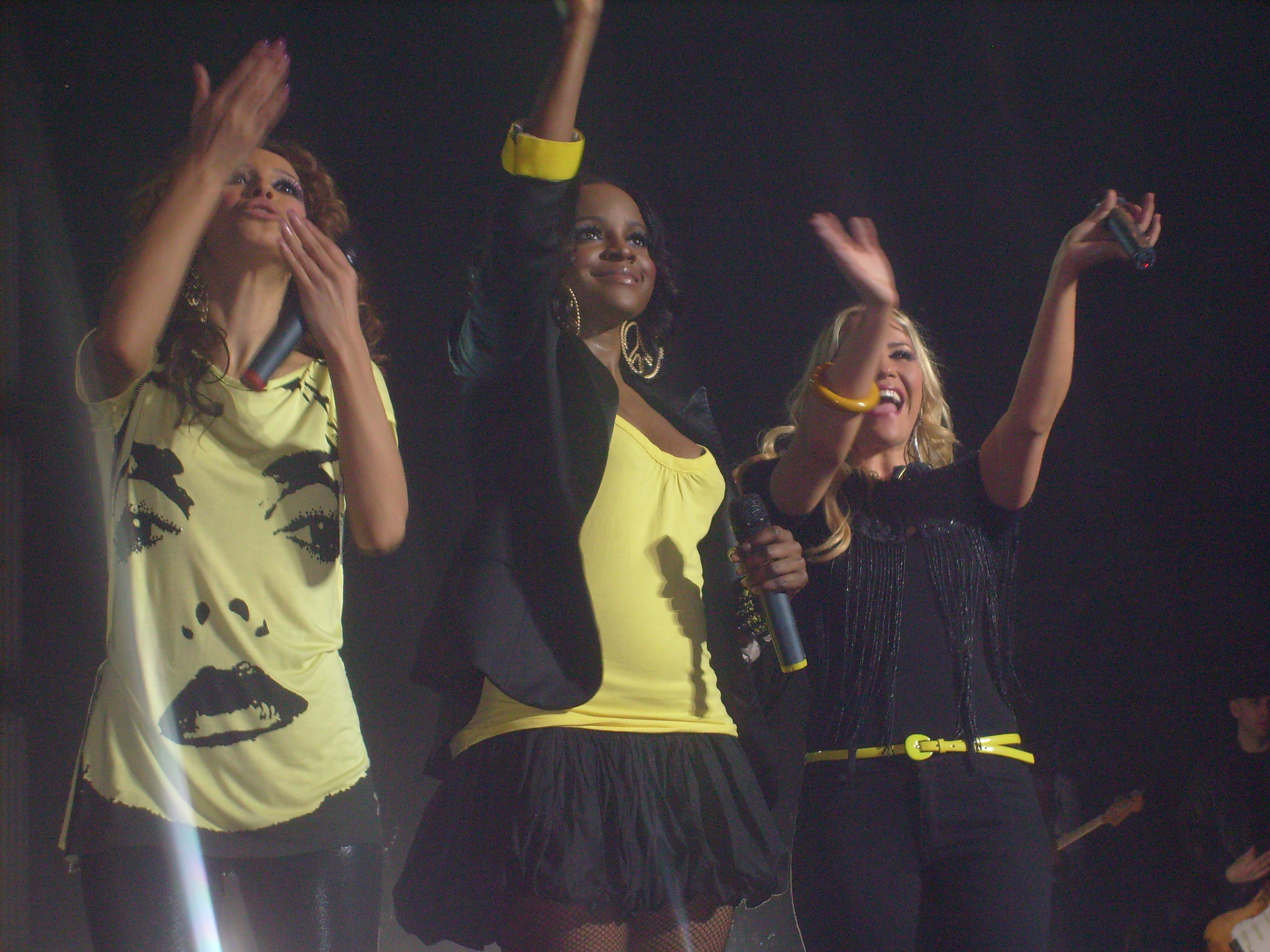
Taio Cruz performed "She's like a Star" with the Sugababes at the 2008 MOBO Awards ceremony.

=== Music video ===
The music video for "She's like a Star" was filmed in Spain. It features an appearance from the actress Roxanne McKee, known for her role as Louise in the British television soap opera Hollyoaks, in which she plays Cruz's love interest. Cruz, who is friends with McKee, explained how the collaboration came about, saying:

Why Roxanne? She's fit and I wanted her in my video! I'm only joking. I've known Roxanne for some time, although I don't watch Hollyoaks so I don't know about the character she plays. We needed an actress who wouldn't feel awkward doing the mock love scenes so I just rang her and she agreed to do it. It was a case of canoodling for a few hours in sunny Spain.

Most scenes of the video take place in a large house. Throughout the video, the pair are touching and kissing with each other, and McKee is shown in the bathtub. In the concluding scenes, she leaves the house and is depicted as a bright star that travels towards the sky, while Cruz stands in front of the house by the pool.

=== Live performances ===
The singer performed "She's like a Star" at the O2 Academy Sheffield, England in August 2008 along with many other tracks from Departure. The Sugababes, along with Cruz, performed the song as part of a medley with their single "Girls" at the 2008 MOBO Awards ceremony. Cruz performed it on MTV Live Sessions along with many of his previous and follow-up singles. He performed "She's like a Star" on 15 May 2011 at Radio 1's Big Weekend, as the fourth song on the set list, which included his hits "Break Your Heart", "Higher" and "Dynamite".

== Track listings and formats ==
- CD single
1. "She's like a Star" – 3:17
2. "She's like a Star" (Cahill Remix Radio Edit) – 3:38
3. "I Just Wanna Know" (Jim Beanz Remix) – 4:18
- Digital download
1. "She's like a Star" – 3:17
- Digital download (remix)
1. "She's like a Star" (Remix featuring the Sugababes and Busta Rhymes) – 3:40
- Digital download (K.R Version)
1. "She's like a Star" (featuring K.R) – 3:38
- Extended play (remixes)
1. "She's like a Star" (Cahill Remix) – 3:38
2. "She's like a Star" (DJ Naughty Boy Remix) – 5:22
3. "She's like a Star" (Dubwise Remix) – 6:00
4. "She's like a Star" (Jeremy Short Remix) – 5:30

== Charts ==
=== Weekly charts ===
| Chart (2008) | Peak position |
|---|---|
| Scottish Singles Sales (Official Charts) | 24 |
| UK Singles (OCC) | 20 |
| UK Hip Hop/R&B (Official Charts) | 6 |

=== Year-end charts ===
| Chart (2008) | Position |
|---|---|
| UK Singles (OCC) | 135 |

== Certifications ==
| Region | Certification | Certified units/sales |
|---|---|---|
| United Kingdom (BPI) | Silver | 200,000^{‡} |
^{‡} Sales+streaming figures based on certification alone.
