= No Other One =

No Other One may refer to:

- "No Other One", a single by Taio Cruz from his album Rokstarr
- "No Other One", a song by Weezer from their album Pinkerton.
