= I'll Never Love Again (disambiguation) =

"I'll Never Love Again" is a song from the 2018 film and soundtrack, A Star is Born.

I'll Never Love Again may also refer to:

== Books ==
- I'll Never Love Again, play by Clare Barron
- I'll Never Love Again, List of Sweet Valley University novels

== Music ==
- "I'll Never Love Again", song by Dinah Shore 1946
- "I'll Never Love Again", based on "La borrachita" by Ignacio Fernández Esperón from the 1947 film On the Old Spanish Trail
- "I'll Never Love Again", song by Elsa Miranda
- "I'll Never Love Again", song by The Pogs P. Best 1967
- "I'll Never Love Again", song by Johnny Burnette J. Lubin, J. Burnette, B-side of "Sweet Baby Doll" 1959
- "If It Can't Be You" (a.k.a. I'll Never Love Again) by Gary Usher from album The Big Beat 1963
- "I'll Never Love Again", song by Jim Walsh Ireland in the Eurovision Song Contest 1986
- "I'll Never Love Again", song by Juice Newton from Well Kept Secret 1977
- "I'll Never Love Again", song by Taio Cruz from Departure (Taio Cruz album) and The Rokstarr Collection
- "I'll Never Love Again", song by New Found Glory Not Without a Fight 2009
- "I'll Never Love Again", song by Hamilton Leithauser from Black Hours (album) 2014
- "I'll Never Love Again", song by Yoyoy Villame
- "I'll Never Love Again", song by Eddie Peregrina
- "I'll Never Love Again", song by Chico Leverett on Third Man Records and Motown discography
- "I'll Never Love Again", song from Much Ado, musical by Bernard Taylor
- "I'll Never Love Again", song by Basics from Get Back (Basics album)

== Other ==
- "I'll Never Love Again", episode of Lux Video Theater Richard Long (actor) Ruta Lee 1955
