= List of Billboard Mainstream Top 40 number-one songs of 2010 =

This is a list of songs which reached number one on the Billboard Mainstream Top 40 (or Pop Songs) chart in 2010.

During 2010, a total of 17 singles hit number-one on the charts.

== Chart history ==
Key
†	Indicates best-performing single of 2010

Issue date	Song	Artist(s)	Ref.
January 2	"Replay"	Iyaz	
January 9	"Replay"	Iyaz	
January 16	"Bad Romance"	Lady Gaga	
January 23	"Bad Romance"	Lady Gaga	
January 30	"Bad Romance"	Lady Gaga	
February 6	"Tik Tok" †	Ke$ha	
February 13	"Tik Tok" †	Ke$ha	
February 20	"Tik Tok" †	Ke$ha	
February 27	"Tik Tok" †	Ke$ha	
March 6	"Tik Tok" †	Ke$ha	
March 13	"Tik Tok" †	Ke$ha	
March 20	"Tik Tok" †	Ke$ha	
March 27	"Telephone"	Lady Gaga featuring Beyoncé	
April 3	"Telephone"	Lady Gaga featuring Beyoncé	
April 10	"Telephone"	Lady Gaga featuring Beyoncé	
April 17	"Telephone"	Lady Gaga featuring Beyoncé	
April 24	"In My Head"	Jason Derülo	
May 1	"In My Head"	Jason Derülo	
May 8	"Rude Boy"	Rihanna	
May 15	"Rude Boy"	Rihanna	
May 22	"Nothin' on You"	B.o.B featuring Bruno Mars	
May 29	"Break Your Heart"	Taio Cruz featuring Ludacris	
June 5	"Break Your Heart"	Taio Cruz featuring Ludacris	
June 12	"Break Your Heart"	Taio Cruz featuring Ludacris	
June 19	"Your Love Is My Drug"	Ke$ha	
June 26	"Your Love Is My Drug"	Ke$ha	
July 3	"California Gurls"	Katy Perry featuring Snoop Dogg	
July 10	"California Gurls"	Katy Perry featuring Snoop Dogg	
July 17	"California Gurls"	Katy Perry featuring Snoop Dogg	
July 24	"California Gurls"	Katy Perry featuring Snoop Dogg	
July 31	"California Gurls"	Katy Perry featuring Snoop Dogg	
August 7	"California Gurls"	Katy Perry featuring Snoop Dogg	
August 14	"California Gurls"	Katy Perry featuring Snoop Dogg	
August 21	"Love the Way You Lie"	Eminem featuring Rihanna	
August 28	"Love the Way You Lie"	Eminem featuring Rihanna	
September 4	"Dynamite"	Taio Cruz	
September 11	"Dynamite"	Taio Cruz	
September 18	"Dynamite"	Taio Cruz	
September 25	"Dynamite"	Taio Cruz	
October 2	"Teenage Dream"	Katy Perry	
October 9	"Teenage Dream"	Katy Perry	
October 16	"Teenage Dream"	Katy Perry	
October 23	"Teenage Dream"	Katy Perry	
October 30	"Just the Way You Are"	Bruno Mars	
November 6	"Just the Way You Are"	Bruno Mars	
November 13	"Just the Way You Are"	Bruno Mars	
November 20	"Just a Dream"	Nelly	
November 27	"Just a Dream"	Nelly	
December 4	"Only Girl (In the World)"	Rihanna	
December 11	"Only Girl (In the World)"	Rihanna	
December 18	"Only Girl (In the World)"	Rihanna	
December 25	"Raise Your Glass"	P!nk	

== See also ==
- 2010 in music
