= Don't You Dare =

Single by Taio Cruz
- Released: 21 June 2014
- Recorded: 2013–2014
- Genre: Pop, R&B, folktronica
- Length: 3:14
- Songwriters: Taio Cruz, Lukasz Gottwald
- Producers: Dr. Luke, Taio Cruz

Taio Cruz singles chronology
"Fast Car" (2012)	"Don't You Dare" (2014)	"Do What You Like" (2015)

"Don't You Dare" is a song by British singer/songwriter and record producer Taio Cruz. The song appeared online on 21 June 2014. An official cover art similar to that of his single "Do What You Like" surfaced online as well. The song was originally meant for his never released studio album #Black, as well as impacting radio on 12 May. However, neither the song or album were ever officially released.

== Track listing ==
Digital download - Single
No.	Title	Length
1.	"Don't You Dare"

== Release history ==
Region	Date	Format	Label
United Kingdom	21 July 2014	Digital download	
