= Telling the World =

Single by Taio Cruz

from the album Rio: Music From The Motion Picture, Rokstarr, and TY.O
- Released: 20 March 2011
- Recorded: 2009–2010
- Genre: R&B; pop rock; dance pop
- Length: 3:33 (original version); 4:09 (radio version)
- Label: Island
- Songwriters: Taio Cruz; Alan Kasirye
- Producer: Taio Cruz

Taio Cruz singles chronology
"Higher" (2010)	"Telling the World" (2011)	"Falling in Love" (2011)

Music video
- "Telling the World (From the Soundtrack to "RIO" the Movie)" on YouTube

"Telling the World" is a song by English singer-songwriter Taio Cruz, released as the seventh overall single and first single from the second re-release of his second studio album, Rokstarr. The song also appears on his third album TY.O, and in the film Rio as the main theme for the film. The lyrics are sung in the perspective of Blu, the protagonist of the film. The song was released in the United Kingdom on 20 March 2011 via digital download, peaking at number 138 on the UK Singles Chart. The music video was uploaded to YouTube on 18 March 2011.

== Reception ==
The song was given 3 out of 5 stars when reviewed by Digital Spy. Editor Nick Levene claimed: "We'll be honest - we're more than partial to a proper movie theme tune. From R Kelly's Space Jam ballad 'I Believe I Can Fly', to Aerosmith's 'I Don't Want to Miss a Thing' from Armageddon, to the Titanic belter 'My Heart Will Go On' by Celine, they often provide us with a much-needed fix of gut-stirring emotion. Given his recent worldwide success, it only seems fair that Taio Cruz would have a pop at it - in this case for the forthcoming film Rio; you know, from those cute-but-slightly-annoying Orange Mobile ads at the cinema. The track ticks all the necessary boxes: emotive lyrics, an uplifting piano 'n' drums riff and catchy, suitably Brazilian 'ooh-way-oohs', and what's more - he's introduced it's accompanying music video below with a shout-out to us lot at DS Towers. Never let it be said that Taio Cruz isn't a gentlemen - dirty pictures of Ke$ha squatting over a loo aside, of course".

== Music videos ==
There are two music videos for this song. One of them is a short video with Cruz in the studio with the characters interacting. There is dialogue from the film, even added dialogue, and an interruption from one of the monkeys. The other, being longer with a complete version of the song filmed in Los Angeles, features Cruz walking on a beach or in a city, even on a bridge. In this video, the clips are muted, and some are being shown on buildings. Both music videos have clips from the film.

== Track listing ==
- US digital download
1. "Telling the World" (Rio Pop Mix) – 4:09
- International digital single
1. "Telling the World" (From the Motion Picture Rio) – 3:33
2. "Telling the World" (radio version) – 4:09

== Charts ==
Chart performance for "Telling the World"
Chart (2011)	Peak position
Austria (Ö3 Austria Top 40)	21
German Airplay Chart	46
Netherlands (Single Top 100)	96
UK Singles (The Official Charts Company)	138

== Release history ==
Release history and formats for "Telling the World"
Region	Date	Format
United Kingdom	20 March 2011	Digital download
