= Higher (Taio Cruz song) =

2010 single by Taio Cruz

- International single cover

Single by Taio Cruz featuring Kylie Minogue and/or Travie McCoy

from the album Rokstarr (Bonus track)
- Released: 26 November 2010
- Recorded: 2009–2010
- Genre: Dance; electronic; Europop; disco
- Length: 3:08 (Note: The track length varies depending on the version: the solo or Minogue recording is 3:08, the McCoy feature lasts 3:40, and the version combining Minogue and McCoy clocks in at 3:22.)
- Label: Island
- Songwriters: Taio Cruz; Sandy Wilhelm
- Producers: Cruz; Wilhelm

Taio Cruz singles chronology
"Shine a Light" (2010)	"Higher" (2010)	"Cryin' Over You" (2011)

Kylie Minogue singles chronology
"Get Outta My Way" (2010)	"Higher" (2010)	"Better than Today" (2010)

Travie McCoy singles chronology
"We'll Be Alright" (2010)	"Higher" (2010)	"Pretty Girls" (2011)

Music videos
- "Higher" (with Kylie Minogue) on YouTube; "Higher" (with Travie McCoy) on YouTube

"Higher" is a song recorded by English singer-songwriter Taio Cruz, which he co-wrote and co-produced with Sandy Vee. Although initially conceived for Kylie Minogue's 2010 album Aphrodite, the track was ultimately not included. Cruz recorded a solo version of "Higher" for a revised US edition of his second studio album, Rokstarr (2010). He then recorded two duet versions: one with Minogue for a European digital release on 26 November 2010, and another featuring rapper Travie McCoy for the US release on 30 November.

A blend of dance, electronic, Europop, and disco track, "Higher" aims to evoke dancefloor euphoria. The solo version was praised as a Rokstarr highlight, and the Minogue version also received favourable reviews, often preferred over the McCoy version. The single was a commercial success, entering the top 20 and receiving certifications in various countries across Europe, the Americas, and Australasia. In the United States, it topped the Dance Club Songs chart and earned a Platinum certification from the Recording Industry Association of America.

Alex Herron directed two music videos for "Higher": one pairing Cruz with Minogue, and the other with McCoy. Set within a London Docklands warehouse, the videos depict an indoor car race. Cruz promoted "Higher" extensively in 2011 through televised performances, enlisting singers like Kimberly Wyatt and Jade Ewen to fill in for Minogue. He has continued to include the song in his live sets at numerous festivals.

== Background and development ==
Following the success of "Break Your Heart" in the United Kingdom, Taio Cruz signed with Mercury/Island Def Jam to launch the single in the United States. A remix featuring Ludacris propelled the track to the top of the Billboard Hot 100 and achieved triple platinum certification from the Recording Industry Association of America (RIAA) in 2010. Cruz then prepared his US debut album, a modified version of his 2009 release Rokstarr, which curated tracks from his first two British albums, Departure (2008) and Rokstarr. The subsequent single, "Dynamite" (2010), set a record as the first song by a British artist to sell over 5 million digital copies in the US, establishing Cruz as one of the few British artists making a major impact in the US market at the time.

By the end of 2009, Cruz revealed he was working with Australian singer Kylie Minogue on tracks for her next studio album, Aphrodite (2010). He characterized the music they were creating as danceable and contemporary. According to Cruz, the collaboration began at the request of Minogue's team, who provided him with examples to guide the musical direction. Cruz composed and submitted two songs, including the track "Higher". However, these tracks were not included on the final album. Following a chance encounter in Ibiza in 2010, Cruz invited Minogue to record "Higher" with him at his home studio. Both artists expressed enthusiasm for the collaboration. "It is funny how I just need to wait for the right time [to record 'Higher']. I think this is a killer track," Minogue said.

== Releases ==
The solo version of "Higher" initially appeared on the US revised edition of Rokstarr, which was digitally released on June 1, 2010. In September, the solo version was also included on the UK-exclusive compilation, The Rokstarr Collection. In October, the solo version was sent to the radio stations in France, while a remix featuring Minogue was announced. The Minogue remix was digitally released in Australia and several European countries on November 26 by Island Records. It was then issued as a CD single in Germany on December 10, bundled with Cruz's BBC Radio 1 Live Lounge cover of "Little Lion Man" (2009) by Mumford & Sons. The two-track package was simultaneously available digitally in Australia and selected European countries, and physically released in France in January 2011.

In the US, "Higher" was released as a new remix featuring rapper Travie McCoy. It was first serviced to US radio stations on 30 November 2010. This version subsequently received a digital release in the US and Australia in late December. According to a January 2011 report by Digital Spy's Robert Copsey, British station BBC Radio 1 placed the US remix featuring McCoy on its B Playlist, choosing it over the Minogue version. (Note: BBC Radio curates a selection of approximately 50 songs for daytime rotation with varying frequencies. B-List songs get around 15 plays per week. Radio 1 is focused on a young audience with a high proportion of new and UK music, while Radio 2 is a broader, more popular station for an older demographic.) However, BBC Radio 2 added the Minogue version to its B Playlist during the week of January 22. In the same month, Dutch radio station Radio 538 reported that Cruz had planned for a remix of "Higher" with pop group K3 for a release in the Benelux region, but it was not materialized.

Two digital remix EPs were issued: the first, in January 2011, featured remixes by DJ Wonder, British duo Seventh Heaven, and production group Club Junkies. A second remix EP arrived in February 2011, containing mixes from American producers Jody Den Broeder and Michael Rizzo (whose mix was dubbed "The Ultimate High"), as well as the English duo Wideboys. The Ultimate High remix utilizes the McCoy version, while Broeder's remix incorporates vocals from both the Minogue and McCoy versions. Marc Andrews, writing in Kylie: Song by Song, highlighted DJ Wonder's infusion of grime and dubstep into his remix. A single combining the Minogue and McCoy versions became available in the UK on 7 February. Minogue included her version of "Higher" on the Les Folies Tour edition of Aphrodite, released in Australia in June 2011.

== Composition and reception ==
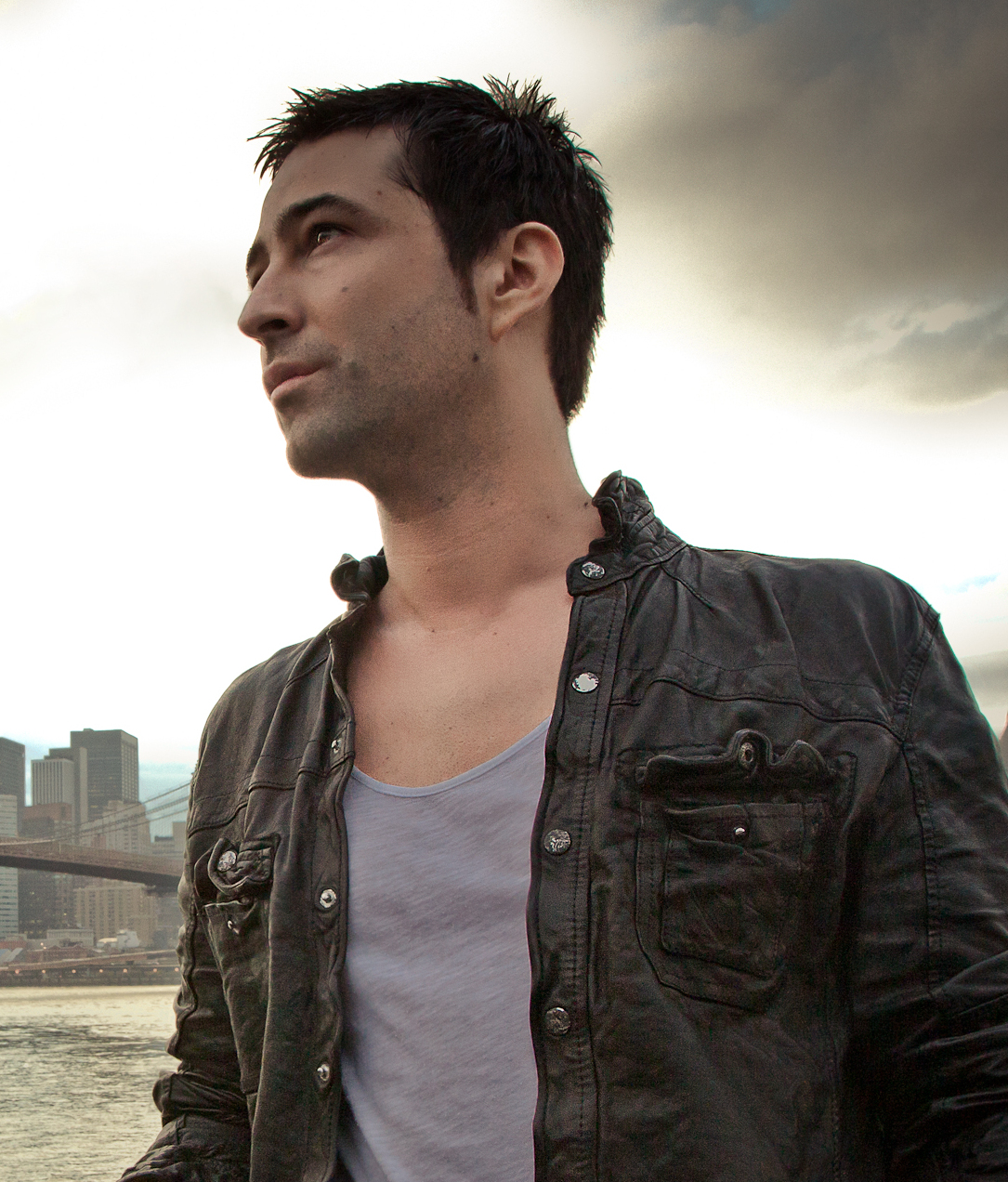
French producer Sandy Vee (pictured in 2010) co-wrote and co-produced "Higher" entirely with Steinberg Nuendo.

Cruz and French producer Sandy Vee co-wrote and co-produced "Higher". Vee produced the track entirely by using digital audio workstation software Steinberg Nuendo. The producer subsequently mixed the track in Paris. Musically, it is set in the key of C# minor with a tempo of 128 beats per minute. "Higher" is a dance, electronic, Europop, and disco track that relies on a simple bassline. The track contains synths and lively beats. Charles Decant of Puremédias noted the urban elements, suggesting they could help Minogue broaden her audience appeal. The song captures the euphoric feeling of the dancefloor, where Cruz declares he knows how to "get down on the floor". McCoy's version also leans into the urban sound, and the rapper mentioned the 1984 musical film Breakin' 2: Electric Boogaloo in his rap verse, "I feel like Breakin' 2: Electric Boogaloo / You play Kelly, I'll be O-Zone".

In reviews of Rokstarr, several critics picked the solo version of "Higher" as an album highlight. Melanie Bertoldi of Billboard felt Cruz sounded exceptionally ecstatic on the track, while Ken Capobianco of Boston.com praised the smooth production but dismissed the "lame-brain" lyrics. Minogue's remix received praise, as critics felt that she blended well with the song. Pure Charts favoured her version over the original solo track. Copsey was impressed by her falsetto vocals and the catchy chorus, calling the track "impossible to resist", while Evening Herald commended it as a "feelgood, camp, catchy, bubblegum summer hit". DirectLyrics considered the inclusion of Minogue made the track more interesting, specifically pointed to the presence and sassiness she added.

The decision to replace Minogue for the US version was criticized by several critics, who expressed a preference for her version over McCoy's. Shahryar Rizvi of Dallas Observer panned the rapper's lazy songwriting, while DirectLyrics opined that he contributed little to the track, suggesting that American singer-songwriter Wynter Gordon would have been a better choice for the US feature. In retrospect, Classic Pop placed "Higher" among Minogue's best collaboration, while Clash lauded it as "a duet of titans" that deserves to be recognised and listed it as one of her best tracks.

== Commercial performance ==
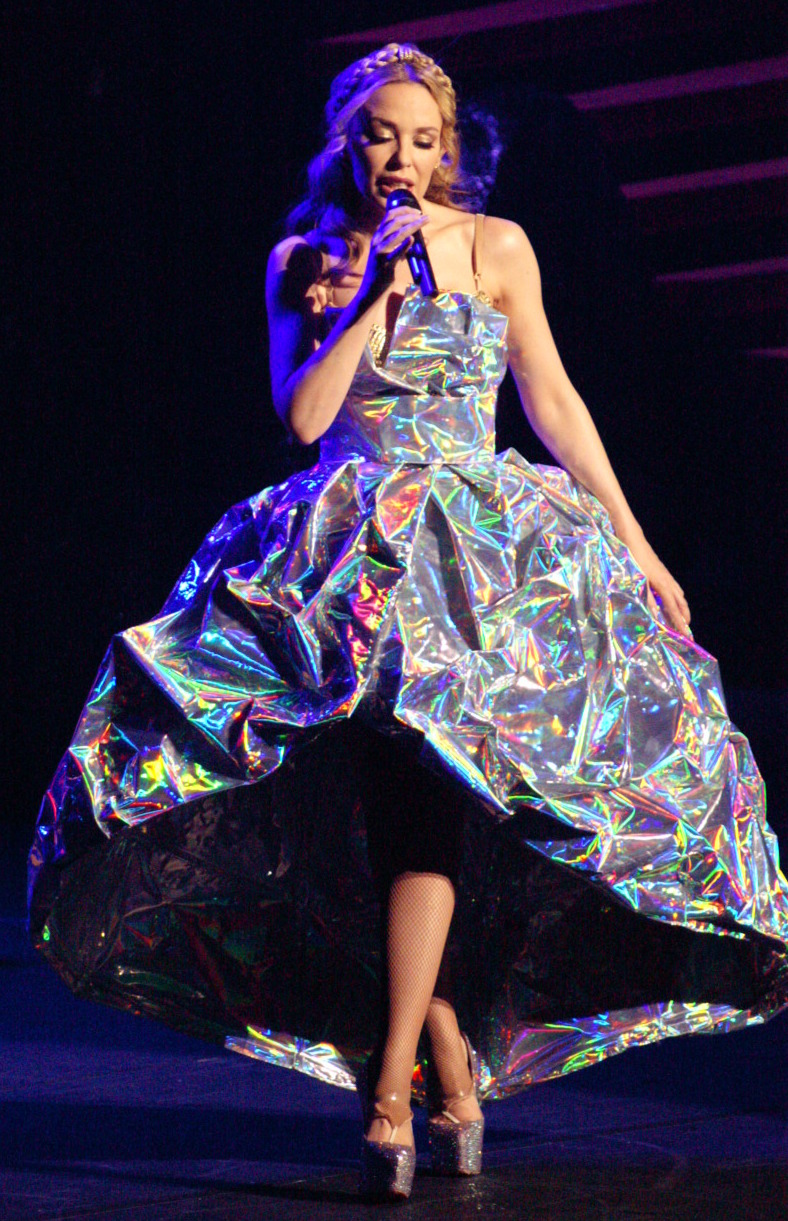
Originally written for Minogue's (pictured in 2011) Aphrodite (2010), "Higher" became her 34th top 10 entry in the UK.

In the UK, "Higher" peaked at number 8 on the UK Singles Chart on 12 February 2011, selling 37,437 copies during its fourth charting week. Alan Jones of Music Week reported that "Higher" faced more simultaneous competing cover versions than any other song in chart history, including 29 soundalikes available online on Amazon and iTunes alone. The single marked Cruz's seventh, McCoy's second, and Minogue's 34th top 10 entry in the region. It became one of Minogue's best-selling singles in the UK, selling 338,000 copies in the United Kingdom by May 2018. Across European countries, Minogue's version peaked in the top 5 on charts in Luxembourg (1), Norway (2), Poland (2), Austria (3), Germany (3), and Hungary (4). The single was certified platinum in Austria, Germany, and Switzerland.

On 19 February 2011, McCoy's version of "Higher" peaked at number 24 on the US Billboard Hot 100. Remixes of "Higher" featuring both Minogue and McCoy were sent to US dance clubs, leading to all three artists sharing credit for the song on the Dance/Club Play Songs chart. "Higher" climbed to number 3 on the chart on 5 March, the same week Minogue topped the chart with "Better than Today", making her the first act ever with two concurrent top-three hits on that chart. Three weeks later, on 26 March, "Higher" hit number one for a week. According to Jones, the release of "Higher" sparked renewed interest in its parent album, Rokstarr, leading to a revival for the album on charts worldwide in January 2011.

== Promotion ==
A lyrics video for Minogue's remix of "Higher" was uploaded on YouTube by Island Records on 1 November 2010. Norwegian director Alex Herron directed two music videos for "Higher", featuring Cruz with Minogue and McCoy, respectively. Minogue's version was released on 19 November 2010, before the release of McCoy's version two days later. Shot in a London Docklands warehouse, the video with Minogue begins with two BMW cars racing inside. Minogue and Cruz ride as passengers in the backseat. Following the race, the cars converge, and the singers emerge. Minogue, accompanied by a group of female dancers, then engages in a face-off with Cruz as they sing in front of a band. Following a similar concept to the Minogue version, the video featuring McCoy adds new angles and scenes. Rizvi questioned the concept of both videos and suggested that the singers should sit in the front seat. DirectLyrics, despite complimenting Minogue's appearance, found the video too safe and underwhelming. PureMedias echoed the lack of originality and suggested likely BMW funding, given the obvious product placement.

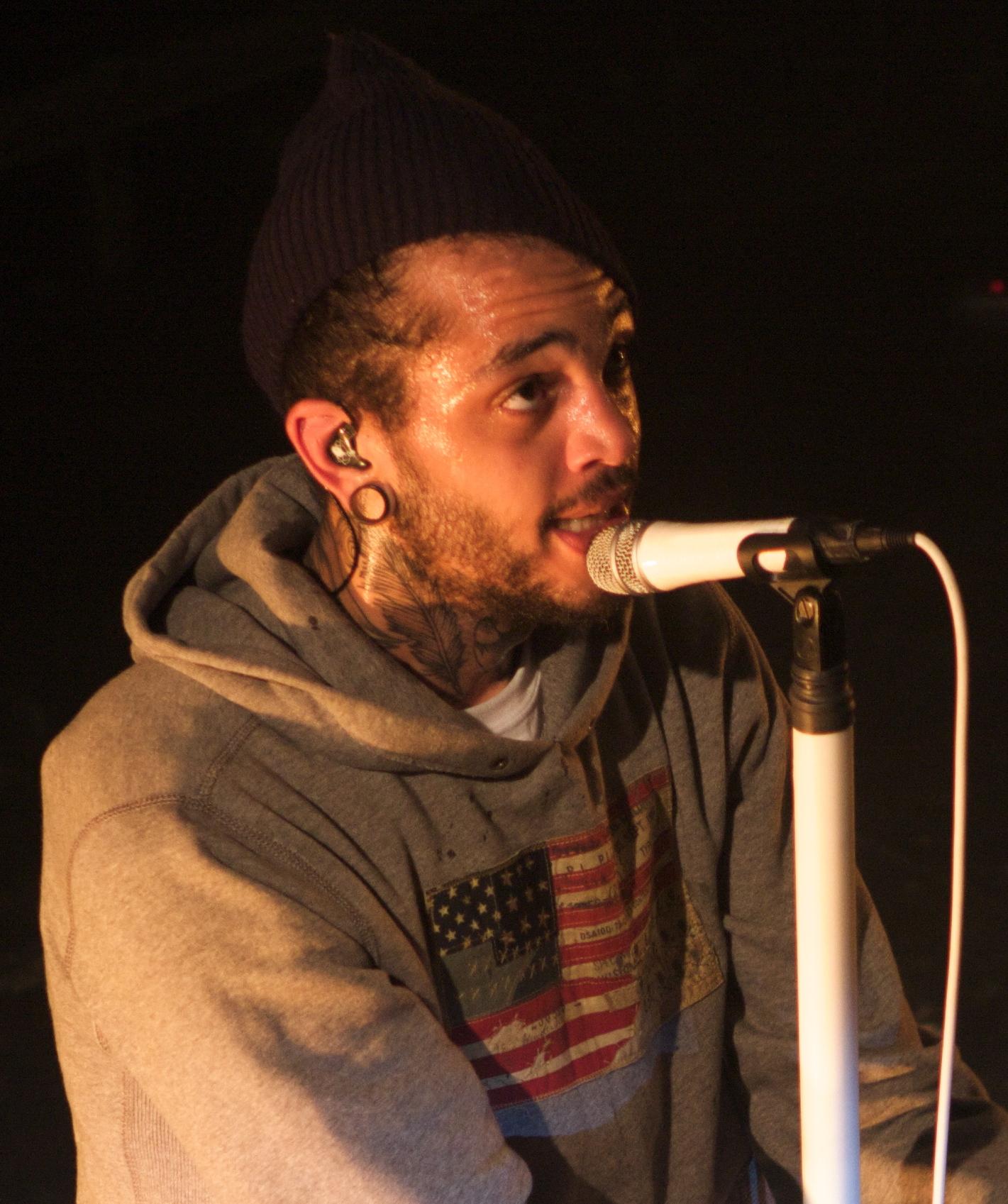
McCoy (pictured in 2011) performed his remix of "Higher" with Cruz at the Madison Square Garden in December 2010.

On 30 October 2010, Cruz and Minogue sang "Higher" on stage for the first time at Starfloor 2010, a French musical event organized by Fun Radio. The performance occurred at Bercy Arena, Paris, in front of 17,000 people. Two months later, on 10 December, Cruz and McCoy performed the song on Z100's Jingle Ball 2010 at the Madison Square Garden, New York City. Glenn Gamboa of Newsday found the performance lackluster, while Ben Rafliff of The New York Times highlighted it as one of the performances showcasing collectivity and interwoven trends within the year's teen pop scene.

Cruz promoted "Higher" by performing the track in several television shows in the UK in February 2011. He sang with British singer Jade Ewen on T4 (7 February), and performed with American singer Kimberly Wyatt on ITV's Daybreak (14 February) and BBC's Let's Dance for Comic Relief (19 February). He performed the track for BBC Live Lounge on 25 February, and in two US television talk shows in March: The Ellen DeGeneres Show (1 March) and Conan (4 March). Throughout 2010 and 2011, Cruz played "Higher" on several festival concerts, including Jingle Bell Ball (4 December 2010), KISS 108's Jingle Ball (9 December 2010), and BBC Radio 1's Big Weekend (15 May 2011). On 20 November 2011, Christina Grimmie performed at the pre-show of American Music Awards of 2011 alongside Cruz in a special rendition of "Higher". A year later, Minogue sang "Higher" at the 2012 Abu Dhabi Grand Prix on 2 November 2012, where she dressed in a blue one-piece suit.

== Personnel ==
Personnel are adapted from the 2010 CD single liner notes and Apple Music.

- Taio Cruz – vocals, songwriting, production
- Kylie Minogue – vocals
- Sandy Vee – songwriting, production, mixing engineer
- Dick Beetham – mastering engineer
- Simon Colin – recording engineer
- Travie McCoy – vocals

== Charts ==
=== Weekly charts ===
2010–2011 weekly chart performance for the Kylie Minogue version of "Higher", except where noted
Chart (2010–2011)	Peak position
Australia (ARIA)	25
Austria (Ö3 Austria Top 40)	3
Belgium (Ultratop 50 Flanders)	12
Belgium (Ultratop 50 Wallonia)	9
Canada Hot 100 (Billboard)	13
CIS Airplay (TopHit)	10
Finland (Suomen virallinen lista)	7
France (SNEP)	7
Germany (GfK)	3
Global Dance Tracks (Billboard)	8
Hungary (Rádiós Top 40)	4
Ireland (IRMA)	7
Luxembourg Digital Songs (Billboard)	1
Mexico (Billboard Ingles Airplay)	10
Netherlands (Dutch Top 40) Travie McCoy version	7
Netherlands (Single Top 100) Travie McCoy version	15
New Zealand (Recorded Music NZ)	5
Norway (VG-lista)	2
Poland (Polish Airplay Top 100)	2
Poland (Dance Top 50)	31
Russia Airplay (TopHit)	10
Spain (Promusicae)	16
Spain (Airplay Chart)	6
Sweden (Sverigetopplistan)	18
Switzerland (Schweizer Hitparade)	4
Scottish Singles Sales (Official Charts)	6
UK Singles (Official Charts) Kylie Minogue and Travie McCoy version	8
UK Singles Downloads (Official Charts) Kylie Minogue and Travie McCoy version	8
Ukraine Airplay (TopHit)	91
US Billboard Hot 100 Travie McCoy version	24
US Dance Club Songs (Billboard) Kylie Minogue and Travie McCoy version	1
US Dance Airplay (Billboard) Travie McCoy version	6
US Latin Pop Airplay (Billboard) Travie McCoy version	40
US Pop Airplay (Billboard) Travie McCoy version	13
US Rhythmic Airplay (Billboard) Travie McCoy version	24

=== Year-end charts ===
2011 year-end charts for the Kylie Minogue version of "Higher", except where noted
Chart (2011)	Position
Austria (Ö3 Austria Top 40)	20
Belgium (Ultratop Flanders)	88
Belgium (Ultratop Wallonia)	80
Brazil (Crowley)	87
Canada (Canadian Hot 100)	58
France (SNEP) Taio Cruz version	21
Germany (Official German Charts)	18
Hungary (Rádiós Top 40)	12
Netherlands (Dutch Top 40) Travie McCoy version	35
Netherlands (Single Top 100) Travie McCoy version	94
Poland (Dance Top 50)	94
Russia Airplay (TopHit)	75
Switzerland (Schweizer Hitparade)	27
UK Singles (Official Charts Company) Kylie Minogue and Travie McCoy version	70
US Dance Club Songs (Billboard) Kylie Minogue and Travie McCoy version	3
US Dance/Mix Show Airplay (Billboard) Travie McCoy version	33

== Certifications ==
Certifications for the Taio Cruz version of "Higher", except where noted
Region	Certification	Certified units/sales
Australia (ARIA) Kylie Minogue version	Gold	35,000^{^}
Austria (IFPI Austria)	Platinum	30,000^{*}
Brazil (Pro-Música Brasil)	Gold	30,000^{‡}
Canada (Music Canada)	Platinum	80,000^{*}
Germany (BVMI)	Platinum	300,000^{‡}
New Zealand (RMNZ) Kylie Minogue version	Gold	7,500^{*}
Sweden (GLF)	Gold	20,000^{‡}
Switzerland (IFPI Switzerland) Kylie Minogue version	Platinum	30,000^{^}
United Kingdom (BPI) Kylie Minogue and Travie McCoy version	Gold	338,000
United States (RIAA)	Platinum	1,000,000^{*}
^{*} Sales figures based on certification alone.^{^} Shipments figures based on certification alone.^{‡} Sales+streaming figures based on certification alone.

== Release history ==
Release dates and formats for "Higher"
Region	Date	Format	Version
Europe	26 November 2010	Digital download	Featuring Kylie Minogue
Australia	26 November 2010	Digital download	Featuring Kylie Minogue
United States	30 November 2010	Adult contemporary radio	Featuring Travie McCoy
Canada	7 December 2010	Digital download	Featuring Kylie Minogue
Europe	10 December 2010	Digital download	Featuring Kylie Minogue
Australia	10 December 2010	Digital download	Featuring Kylie Minogue
Germany	10 December 2010	Maxi CD single	Featuring Kylie Minogue
Australia	17 December 2010	Digital download	Featuring Travie McCoy
United States	20 December 2010	Digital download	Featuring Travie McCoy
United Kingdom	19 January 2011	Digital download	EP, featuring Kylie Minogue
France	31 January 2011	CD single	Featuring Kylie Minogue
United States	1 February 2011	Digital download	The Remixes EP
United Kingdom	7 February 2011	Digital download	Featuring Kylie Minogue or Travie McCoy
Brazil	25 February 2011	Digital download	Featuring Kylie Minogue

== See also ==
- List of number-one dance singles of 2011 (U.S.)
