= Falling in Love (Taio Cruz song) =

Promotional single by Taio Cruz

from the album Rokstarr
- B-side: "Acoustic Version"
- Released: 15 April 2011
- Recorded: 2009–2010
- Genre: R&B; pop rock
- Length: 3:32
- Label: Island
- Songwriter(s): Taio Cruz; Alan Kasirye
- Producer(s): Taio Cruz

"Falling in Love" is a song by English singer-songwriter Taio Cruz, released as the eighth overall single and second single from the second re-release of his second studio album, Rokstarr. The single was released exclusively in America and Spain, and was available via digital download from 15 April 2011. The music video was uploaded to YouTube on 18 February 2011.

== Music video ==
The music video was released to YouTube on 18 February 2011. It features Cruz performing the single whilst sitting at a piano in the window of a first floor apartment. He precedes to perform the song there until the second chorus, in which he leaves the apartment, and arrives in a private club where begins to perform on the stage. The lights then fade, and when they rise again, everybody has left the club, except Cruz, who continues to perform the song alone until its conclusion. Despite not being released in the United Kingdom or Europe, the video was made available to watch via YouTube in both territories.

== Track listing ==
1. "Falling in Love" – 3:32
2. "Falling in Love" (Acoustic Version) – 3:29

== Charts ==
Chart (2011)	Peak position
Spain (PROMUSICAE)	58

== Release history ==
Region	Date	Format
Spain	15 April 2011	Digital download
