= Dynamite (Taio Cruz song) =

2010 song by Taio Cruz

Single by Taio Cruz

from the album Rokstarr
- Released: 1 June 2010 (US); 26 July 2010 (AUS); 30 July 2010 (GER, ITA); 6 August 2010 (NED); 23 August 2010 (UK)
- Recorded: 2009
- Studio: A Side (Stockholm); Dr. Luke's (Los Angeles); Milano, Rokstarr (London)
- Genre: Electropop; dance-pop
- Length: 3:22
- Label: Island
- Songwriters: Lukasz Gottwald; Max Martin; Benjamin Levin; Bonnie McKee
- Producers: Dr. Luke; Benny Blanco

Taio Cruz singles chronology
"Dirty Picture" (2010)	"Dynamite" (2010)	"Second Chance" (2010)

Music video
- "Dynamite" on YouTube

"Dynamite" is a song by British singer-songwriter Taio Cruz from the revised version of his second studio album, Rokstarr (2010). The song was written by Max Martin, Bonnie McKee, Benjamin Levin, and Lukasz Gottwald; the latter two are also the producers. The song features additional instrumentation by Cruz himself. It was released internationally as the fourth single from Rokstarr. In the UK, the song was released as the first single from Cruz's compilation album, The Rokstarr Collection (2010). On 1 June 2010, it was released to US and Canadian radio stations as his second single and across Europe as his fourth single. An official remix was released featuring new label mate Jennifer Lopez.

"Dynamite" became Cruz's second number-one single on the UK Singles Chart and the Canadian Hot 100 as well topping charts in Belgium, Luxembourg, Ireland, Australia and New Zealand. The song reached number two on the US Billboard Hot 100, and by January 2012 it had sold more than 5.7 million copies in the U.S. and Canada, becoming the second best-selling song by a British artist in the digital era there, behind Adele's "Rolling in the Deep".

== Composition ==
"Dynamite" is an electropop and dance-pop song. Written in the key of E major, it has a tempo of 120 beats per minute. According to Cruz, "The song 'Dynamite' itself is about when you go to the club and when you go to a party and when you're just going out... you got to feel like, 'I'm just gonna explode.'" Lukasz Gottwald and Max Martin had written the melody, and asked Bonnie McKee to write lyrics. McKee only met Cruz months after the song's release, and later said that "I thought ["Dynamite"] was the dumbest song I had ever written and thought it was going nowhere. And I actually think it was the biggest song I have written so far."

== Release and reception ==
The song was released in the UK on 23 August 2010. The song has met with mixed to positive reviews from contemporary music critics. While reviewing "Rokstarr", Jon Caramanica from The New York Times gave a mixed review, saying that the song has "vapid lyrics to navigate (e.g. "I hit the floor cause that's my plans, plans, plans, plans / I'm wearing all my favorite brands, brands, brands, brands") but they don't disrupt the mood, which is emphatic and rarely sensual".

Nick Levine from Digital Spy rated the song 4 out of 5 stars and gave it a positive review, naming it "a suitably Eurohousey club pumper" and saying that it's "essentially a cheap, tasty, and entirely satisfying banger". The New Yorker critic Sasha Frere-Jones named the song as his second favorite of 2010.

== Chart performance ==
"Dynamite" debuted at number 26 on the Billboard Hot 100 and at number 13 on the Digital Songs chart, selling 83,000 copies in its opening week. The single rose to number 14 on the week ending 10 July 2010 and on the week ending 21 August 2010, the single climbed to a peak of number two, giving Cruz his second top-three single in the US. The song kept this position for three consecutive weeks. It also became Cruz's second consecutive number one single on Billboard's Hot Dance Airplay chart in its 21 August 2010 issue. "Dynamite" charted on the Billboard Hot 100 for 47 weeks, making it the longest run for a single since Train's "Hey, Soul Sister", which stayed on that chart for 54 weeks. As of May 2012, it has sold more than 6 million digital copies in the US alone. This marks the first song by a British act to reach this plateau, the twelfth song to do so, and only the second song to reach 6 million downloads without reaching number one (the first being Jason Mraz's "I'm Yours", which reached number six in September 2008).

The single debuted on the Canadian Hot 100 at number eight on the week ending 17 June 2010, marking Cruz's second Top 10 hit in the country. The following week the single fell to number nine, where it remained at for four consecutive weeks. On the week ending 18 September 2010, the song peaked at number one, becoming Cruz's second Canadian number one single, following "Break Your Heart"'s two-week stay at that position in May 2010. The song became the best-selling single in Canada during 2010 with sales of 319,000 copies.

On the chart dated 16 August 2010, "Dynamite" topped the New Zealand Singles Chart, and was certified gold, selling 7,500 copies. The song topped the Irish Singles Chart in its first week, becoming Cruz's first number one on that chart, following previous number two hit "Break Your Heart".

In Cruz's native United Kingdom, "Dynamite" charted at number one on the UK Singles Chart on 29 August 2010. This became his second number-one single in UK after "Break Your Heart". It knocked "Green Light" by Roll Deep off the summit, and was knocked off in turn by "Please Don't Let Me Go" by Olly Murs a week later.

== Music video ==
The music video begins with a group of female mechanics working on cars at a garage. Cruz, wearing a red helmet, rides a silver motorbike towards the garage and stops by. As the music starts, he takes off his helmet and puts on his black sunglasses. He then kicks off a party, complete with a jacuzzi and fireworks. As the sun goes down and night falls, Cruz gives an impromptu concert of sorts with the mechanics as his audience. An enormous, fiery explosion then goes off behind Cruz, before subsiding into a shower of sparks.

Cruz has said that this is the perfect backdrop for the subtext of his song and that his inspiration came from "wanting to do things on a bike" since his previous videos included cars and boats. "So you're gonna see me spin the tyres on this, which is pretty cool!" One of the vehicles brought for the video shoot was a "massive truck" which was used to film big screen project Universal Soldier. Speaking of the shoot he said "I've never done a video that has this many props in it. We've got the most amazing, wrecked cars."

An official remix video was created by G-Pain which was published on September 11, 2022.

== Live performances ==
Taio performed "Dynamite" for the first time on Live with Regis & Kelly on 9 June 2010. Later, he also performed on Jimmy Kimmel Live!, T4 on the Beach, America's Got Talent, GMTV, Dancing with the Stars, and on 31 December 2010, he performed the song on Dick Clark's New Year's Rockin' Eve with Ryan Seacrest. On 12 August 2012, Cruz performed "Dynamite" at the 2012 Summer Olympics closing ceremony. He also performed it at grand launching of NET. TV in 2013.

== Usage in media ==
The song is featured in the 2011 video game Just Dance 3.

== Track listing ==
- UK CD single and Digital download
1. "Dynamite" (Original Mix) – 3:24
2. "Dynamite" (Ralphi Rosario Club Remix) – 8:03
3. "Dynamite" (Mixin Marc Club Remix) – 5:34
4. "Dynamite" (StoneBridge Club Remix) – 7:20
- German CD single
1. "Dynamite" – 3:24
2. "Dynamite" (Mixin Marc Radio Mix) – 3:34

== Personnel ==
- Songwriting – Lukasz Gottwald, Max Martin, Benjamin Levin, Bonnie McKee, Taio Cruz
- Production, drums, keyboards and programming – Lukasz Gottwald, Benjamin Levin
- Vocals and programming – Taio Cruz
- Engineering – Emily Wright
- Recording assistant – Tatiana Gottwald
- Production coordination – Irene Richter, Vanessa Silberman, Megan Dennis
- Mixing – Serban Ghenea
- Mix engineering – John Hanes
- Assistant mix engineering – Tim Roberts
- Mastering – Tom Coyne

Credits adapted from the liner notes of Rokstarr and Tidal.

== Charts ==
=== Weekly charts ===
Chart (2010–2011)	Peak position
Australia (ARIA)	1
Austria (Ö3 Austria Top 40)	2
Belgium (Ultratop 50 Flanders)	5
Belgium (Ultratop 50 Wallonia)	1
Canada Hot 100 (Billboard)	1
Czech Republic Airplay (ČNS IFPI)	5
Denmark (Tracklisten)	12
Europe (European Hot 100 Singles)	3
Finland (Suomen virallinen lista)	7
France (SNEP)	5
Germany (GfK)	3
Hungary (Dance Top 40)	22
Hungary (Rádiós Top 40)	9
Ireland (IRMA)	1
Israel International Airplay (Media Forest)	10
Italy (FIMI)	27
Luxembourg Digital Songs (Billboard)	1
Mexico Anglo (Monitor Latino)	5
Netherlands (Dutch Top 40)	3
Netherlands (Single Top 100)	4
New Zealand (Recorded Music NZ)	1
Norway (VG-lista)	4
Poland Airplay (ZPAV)	5
Russia Airplay (TopHit)	26
Scottish Singles Sales (Official Charts)	1
Slovakia Airplay (ČNS IFPI)	2
Spain (Promusicae)	22
Spain (Airplay Chart)	6
Sweden (Sverigetopplistan)	9
Switzerland (Schweizer Hitparade)	3
UK Singles (Official Charts)	1
UK Hip Hop/R&B (Official Charts)	1
US Billboard Hot 100	2
US Adult Contemporary (Billboard)	15
US Adult Pop Airplay (Billboard)	5
US Dance Club Songs (Billboard)	1
US Dance Airplay (Billboard)	1
US Pop Airplay (Billboard)	1
US Rhythmic Airplay (Billboard)	2

=== Year-end charts ===
Chart (2010)	Position
Australia (ARIA)	3
Austria (Ö3 Austria Top 40)	15
Belgium (Ultratop 50 Flanders)	26
Belgium (Ultratop 50 Wallonia)	36
Canada (Canadian Hot 100)	4
France (SNEP)	40
Germany (Official German Charts)	22
Hungary (Dance Top 40)	99
Ireland (IRMA)	17
Netherlands (Dutch Top 40)	35
Netherlands (Single Top 100)	48
New Zealand (Recorded Music NZ)	8
Russia Airplay (TopHit)	175
Sweden (Sverigetopplistan)	25
Switzerland (Schweizer Hitparade)	22
UK Singles (OCC)	17
US Billboard Hot 100	9
US Adult Top 40 (Billboard)	46
US Dance Club Songs (Billboard)	15
US Dance/Mix Show Airplay (Billboard)	23
US Mainstream Top 40 (Billboard)	4
US Rhythmic (Billboard)	13

Chart (2011)	Position
Australia (ARIA)	81
Canada (Canadian Hot 100)	39
Hungary (Rádiós Top 40)	22
Netherlands (Dutch Top 40)	93
UK Singles (OCC)	156
US Billboard Hot 100	44
US Adult Contemporary (Billboard)	31
US Adult Top 40 (Billboard)	37

=== Decade-end charts ===
Chart (2010–2019)	Position
Australia (ARIA)	79
US Billboard Hot 100	50

== Certifications and sales ==
Region	Certification	Certified units/sales
Australia (ARIA)	7× Platinum	490,000^{^}
Austria (IFPI Austria)	Platinum	30,000^{*}
Belgium (BRMA)	Gold	15,000^{*}
Brazil (Pro-Música Brasil)	Diamond	250,000^{‡}
Canada (Music Canada)	5× Platinum	400,000^{*}
Denmark (IFPI Danmark)	2× Platinum	180,000^{‡}
Germany (BVMI)	5× Gold	750,000^{‡}
Italy (FIMI)	Platinum	70,000^{‡}
New Zealand (RMNZ)	4× Platinum	120,000^{‡}
Spain (Promusicae)	Platinum	60,000^{‡}
Sweden (GLF)	Platinum	40,000^{‡}
Switzerland (IFPI Switzerland)	Platinum	30,000^{^}
United Kingdom (BPI)	3× Platinum	1,800,000^{‡}
United States (RIAA)	8× Platinum	6,000,000
^{*} Sales figures based on certification alone.^{^} Shipments figures based on certification alone.^{‡} Sales+streaming figures based on certification alone.

== Radio and release history ==
=== Radio adds ===
Region	Date	Format	Label
United States	1 June 2010	Contemporary hit radio	Mercury Records; Island Records
United Kingdom	16 July 2010	Urban radio	Island Records
Australia	26 July 2010	Contemporary hit radio	Island Records Australia; Universal Music Australia

=== Purchaseable release ===
Region	Date	Format	Label
Germany	30 July 2010	Digital download	Universal Music
Italy	30 July 2010	Digital download	Universal Music
Switzerland	30 July 2010	Digital download	Universal Music
Netherlands	6 August 2010	Digital download	Universal Music
Germany	20 August 2010	CD single	Universal Music
United Kingdom	23 August 2010	Digital download	Island
United Kingdom	24 August 2010	CD single	Island

== China Anne McClain version ==
"Dynamite"

Single by China Anne McClain

from the album A.N.T. Farm
- Released: May 3, 2011 (Radio Disney premiere); July 26, 2011
- Recorded: 2010
- Studio: Walt Disney
- Genre: Dance-pop; electropop
- Length: 2:43
- Label: Walt Disney
- Songwriters: Benjamin Levin; Bonnie McKee; Lukasz Gottwald; Max Martin; Taio Cruz

China Anne McClain singles chronology
"Dynamite" (2011)	"Calling All the Monsters" (2011)

"Dynamite" was covered by singer and actress China Anne McClain for the Disney Channel live-action series A.N.T. Farm. It started playing on Radio Disney on 3 May 2011 and was released for digital download on iTunes and Amazon on July 26, 2011, by Walt Disney Records. It is the second track on the series soundtrack of the same name, from which it also served as the lead single. The video of the song was released the same day as a digital download and also received frequent airplay on Disney Channel at the time of its debut on the network. McClain performed it as her lead role, Chyna Parks, in the series' pilot episode TransplANTed. McClain also had a live performance of this song live on August 22, 2011.

=== Music video ===
The music video for McClain's version of the song was aired on Disney Channel and uploaded on China Anne McClain's official VEVO channel on 3 May 2011. It shows McClain performing the song in an audition. It starts out slow and normal, which doesn't draw the judges' (composed of the other A.N.T. Farm cast members) attention. However, afterward, she performs it with such passion and energy that it draws people into the auditorium, which was once empty aside from the panel of judges. The music video has more than 90 million views on YouTube.

=== Charts ===
Chart (2011)	Peak position
US Kid Digital Songs (Billboard)	2

== See also ==
- List of best-selling singles
- List of best-selling singles in the United States
- List of number-one singles of 2010 (Australia)
- List of Canadian Hot 100 number-one singles of 2010
- List of number-one singles of 2010 (Ireland)
- List of number-one singles from the 2010s (New Zealand)
- List of UK Singles Chart number ones of the 2010s
- List of UK R&B Singles Chart number ones of 2010
- List of Billboard Hot Dance Club Songs number ones of 2010
- List of Billboard Mainstream Top 40 number-one songs of 2010
