= Taio Cruz =

English singer and songwriter (born 1980)

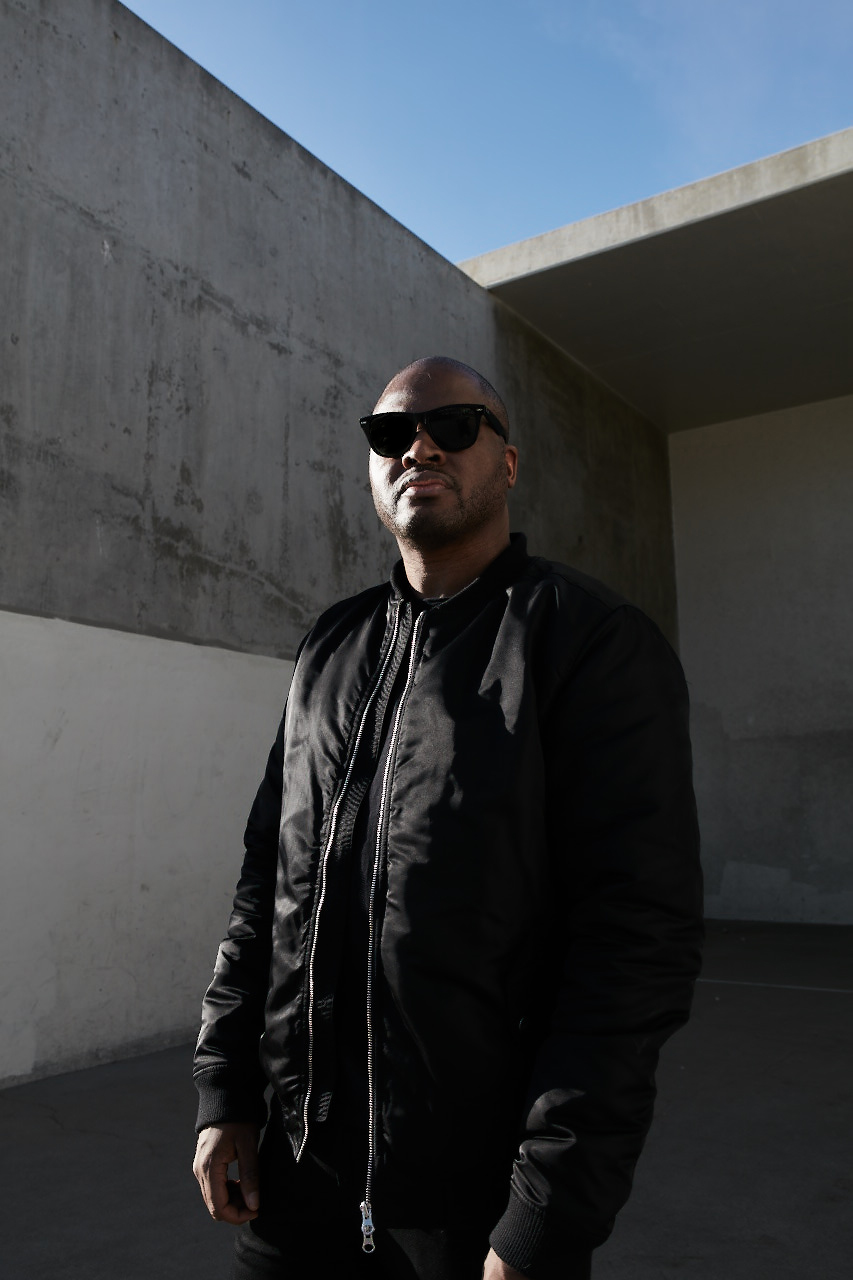
- Cruz in 2017

Background information
- Also known as: Tayo Onile-Ere; Jacob Cruz
- Born: Adetayo Ayowale Onile-Ere; 23 April 1980 (age 46); Brent, London, England
- Genres: Pop; R&B
- Occupations: Singer; songwriter; rapper; record producer
- Years active: 2003–present
- Labels: Rokstarr; Island; Republic; 4th & B'way; Mercury; Tourean; Warner Bros.; Universal
- Website: taiocruz.com

Adetayo Ayowale Onile-Ere (Note: Attributed to multiple sources:) (born 23 April 1980), (Note: Sources differ regarding his birth year; examples include 1980, 1982, 1983 and 1985.) known professionally as Jacob Taio Cruz (/ˈtaɪoʊ/ TY-oh), is a British singer, songwriter, rapper, and record producer.

Cruz was discovered in the mid-2000s by American record producer Tricky Stewart, joining the record company RedZone Entertainment as in-house talent. After several years in songwriting, he released his R&B-styled debut single "I Just Wanna Know" in 2006. A modest hit and his first UK singles chart entry, its success led him to sign with Republic Records and Island Records' UK branch. The labels released his debut studio album, Departure (2008), which he solely wrote, arranged and produced. It received gold certification by the British Phonographic Industry (BPI) and earned critical praise, as well as a nomination at the 2009 Music of Black Origin Awards (MOBO).

Cruz adopted an EDM-pop sound for his subsequent releases. His second album, Rokstarr (2009), was met with further commercial success, entering 13 international music charts and peaking within the top ten of the Billboard 200. Despite mixed critical response, it was preceded by the single "Break Your Heart", which peaked atop both the UK singles chart and Billboard Hot 100, and spawned the single "Dynamite", which peaked at atop the former chart and peaked at number two on the latter. Two further singles, "Dirty Picture" (with Kesha) and "Higher" (featuring Kylie Minogue or Travie McCoy), peaked within the UK chart's top ten. Cruz performed the song "Telling the World" as the lead single for the 2011 animated film Rio's soundtrack. His third studio album, TY.O (2011), moderately entered several international charts, but failed to enter the UK Albums or the Billboard 200; it contained the UK hits "Hangover" (featuring Flo Rida) and "There She Goes" (featuring Pitbull).

He has since released several non-album singles, and co-wrote several hit songs including Tinchy Stryder's "Never Leave You" (2009), Jennifer Lopez's "I'm Into You" (2011), David Guetta's "Without You", "Wish U Were Here" by Cody Simpson (both 2012), and "Kiss Me" by Olly Murs (2014).

== Biography ==
=== Early life and career ===
Cruz was born as Adetayo Ayowale Onile-Ere on 23 April 1980 in London to a Nigerian Yoruba lawyer father and a Brazilian mother who had a hairdressing business. He was raised in Kensal Rise. He was educated at fee-paying independent schools, attending Bilton Grange preparatory school in Warwickshire and Battle Abbey School in East Sussex, before relocating to London where he went to Stanmore College.

Cruz's songwriting career began as part of Tricky Stewart's writing collective, RedZone Entertainment and achieved notability in 2005 when he was awarded a Brit Award for co-writing Will Young's 2004 single, "Your Game".

Cruz is the founder and chief executive of Rockstar Music London, which in 2006 released his debut single "I Just Wanna Know". The single charted at #29 in the UK singles charts. It won him some admirers including Island Records's Darcus Beese and Monte Lipman, who, according to manager Binns, "both believed 'I Just Wanna Know' fitted the format on both sides of the Atlantic". In 2006, Cruz signed a split single deal with Universal Music Group companies, Republic Records and the UK branch of Island Records.

=== 2007–08: Departure ===
In September 2007, Cruz released his second single "Moving On", which made the top 30 in the UK. In March 2008 his next single, "Come On Girl", featuring Luciana, peaked at No. 5 on the UK charts. The related album Departure appeared on 17 March and peaked at No. 17. This was followed by the single "I Can Be", which reached No. 18 in May. On 18 August, "She's Like a Star" was released, which was a remix of the previous single and featured American rapper Busta Rhymes and girl-group Sugababes. The remix later appeared on the Sugababes studio album Catfights & Spotlights, which peaked at No. 20. It was later revealed that Cruz narrowly missed out on the chance to record the song "Umbrella" which was recorded by Rihanna and ended up topping charts around the world.

=== 2009–2011: Rokstarr, international breakthrough and The Rokstarr Collection ===
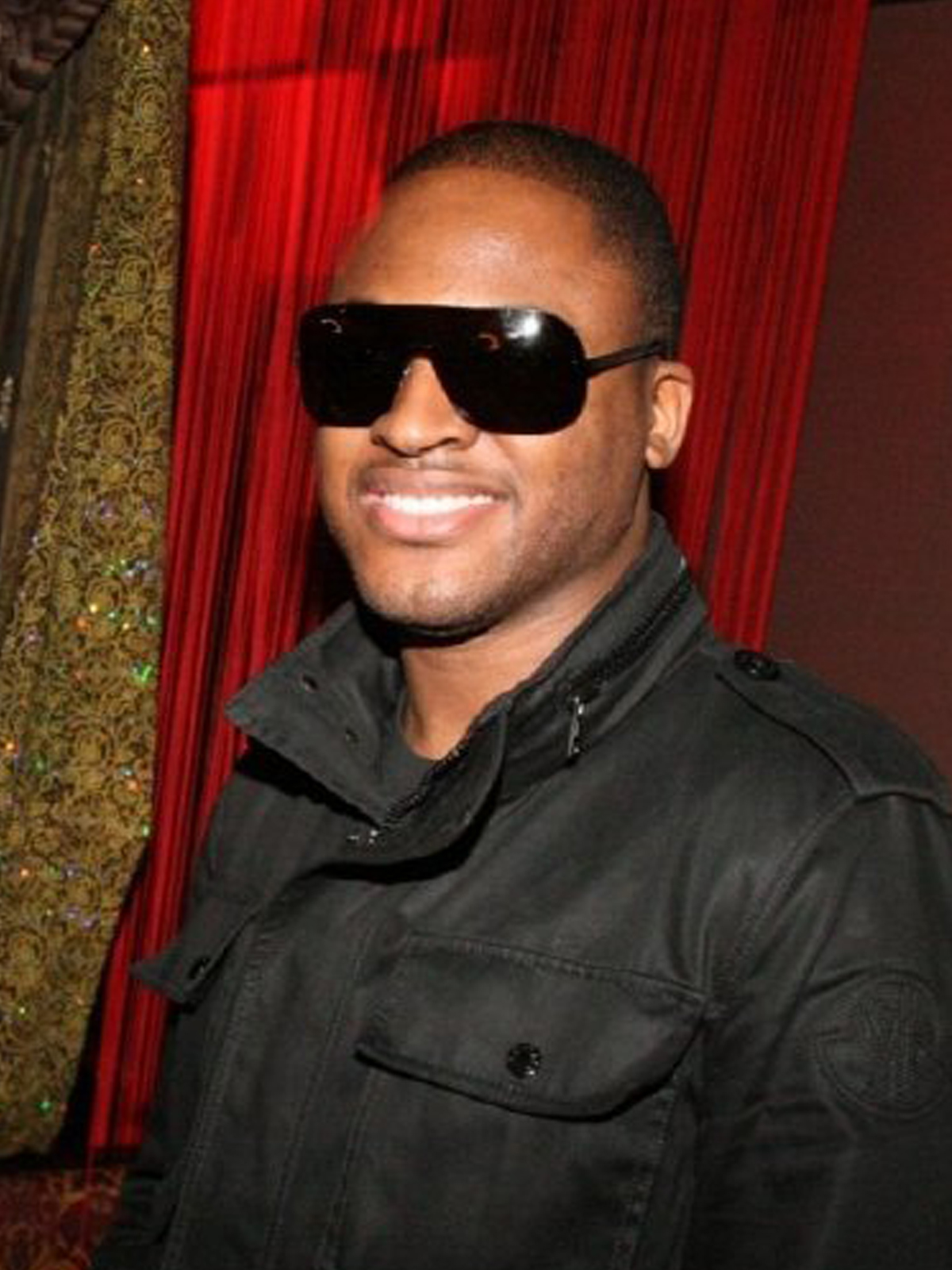
Cruz at Tup Tup Palace nightclub, Newcastle upon Tyne, UK. 2009.

Cruz was featured on Tinchy Stryder's breakout single "Take Me Back" which peaked at No. 3 in the UK Singles Chart. According to Cruz's official Myspace blog, as of 1 January 2009, Rokstarr Music London changed its name to Rokstarr Entertainment Division, abbreviated to R.E.D Inc. During 2009, he worked on his follow-up album entitled Rokstarr. It was released on 12 October through R.E.D Inc./Island Records and is written and produced by Cruz, with co-writes and co-productions predominantly with UK producer Fraser T Smith. The album's lead single "Break Your Heart" was released on 14 September and reached number one in the UK, where it stayed for three weeks. In the US it went directly from number 53 to number one, breaking the record for the largest leap of a début single. At the 2010 Brit Awards, "Break Your Heart" was nominated for Best British Single. The success of the song attracted the attention of David Massey and Daniel Werner from Mercury/Island Def Jam who were excited and aggressive about releasing "Break Your Heart" in the United States on their label. According to Cruz's manager Jamie Binns, the relationship with Monte Lipman at Universal Republic had "gone a bit quiet" by this point and as Taio wanted to be with the label that was most enthusiastic about his music, a move from Universal Republic to Mercury/Island Def Jam was engineered.

The single reached the top spot in the United States for one week on the Billboard Hot 100. In an interview with The Guardian, it was stated that Cruz was "clever" to have hooked up with US rapper Ludacris on his breakthrough hit. In order to introduce Cruz into the U.S. market, David Massey had suggested that the single feature an American rapper with chart credibility. The album spawned two other UK singles, "No Other One", and the top-ten hit "Dirty Picture" featuring American electropop singer Kesha. The album's fourth single (second in the United States) titled "Dynamite" debuted at 26 and peaked at number two on the U.S. Billboard Hot 100. At the 2011 Brit Awards, "Dynamite" was nominated for Best British Single, and at the 2011 Billboard Music Awards the song won three Billboard Awards, including Top Hot 100 Song.

Rokstarr was followed by the compilation album The Rokstarr Collection which includes songs both from Departure and the international version of Rokstarr. Cruz later released four versions of his single "Higher"—one featuring Kylie Minogue, one featuring Travie McCoy, one featuring both, and one with just himself.

Cruz has also been featured on the soundtrack of American reality TV series Jersey Shore.

=== 2011–12: TY.O ===
In March 2011, Cruz premiered an all-new song called "Telling the World", which was written by Cruz and Alan Kasirye for the Rio soundtrack. The track was not featured on any of Cruz's prior studio albums. On 23 May 2011, Cruz received his first Billboard Award in the United States. He announced onstage that his third album, entitled Black and Leather, would be released in the fourth quarter of 2011. In June 2011, Cruz released a collaborative single, "Little Bad Girl", with French DJ David Guetta and American rapper Ludacris. The song was a worldwide smash, topping singles charts across the world. During July and August 2011, a series of unreleased songs, recorded during the album sessions, were leaked to YouTube. in an interview, Cruz promised a "fun" and "energetic" album, and claimed that due to the leak, none of the tracks posted on YouTube would be included on the album. Cruz claimed, "It's a shame really, because one person has spoilt it for all the fans. They could have had an album packed with 17, 18 tracks, and now, they're only getting eleven because of one stupid act of tomfoolery." During the interview, Cruz also claimed that the title of the album had been changed to Troublemaker, after one of the tracks included on the album. On 4 October 2011, the single "Hangover" was officially released in Germany and the US, and it was rumoured that a solo version of the song, that features on the physical release, would be included as a bonus track on the album. However, these rumours were later quashed.

Around October 2011, the album was made available for pre-order, and in turn, the album's final title, TY.O, was revealed. Cruz announced, via his Twitter account, that he made the decision to phonetically name the album TY.O in hopes that it would help people pronounce his name correctly. The album was first released in Germany on 2 December 2011. Originally slated for release in the US on 17 May 2012 it was rescheduled to 31 December 2012 to coincide with the UK release, along with new tracks, including the U.S. single "Fast Car".

Cruz was scheduled to co-headline Pitbull's Australian leg of Planet Pit World Tour in August 2012. On 12 August, Cruz performed at the closing ceremony of the 2012 Summer Olympics in London. The performance at London's Olympic Stadium saw Cruz sing his own song "Dynamite", and also perform "Written in the Stars" alongside Jessie J and Tinie Tempah.

=== 2013–present: #Black, Roses Collection, and business ventures ===
In early 2013, Cruz recorded vocals over the song "Brazil" by electronic artist Deadmau5 and titled the remake "Touch the Sky".

In August 2013, Taio Cruz announced on his Facebook and Twitter account that he would be releasing a new app. It is called Kewe and is a social media app for Android and iOS, where people can interact and keep up with what Taio Cruz is doing. It was launched on 18 August 2013.

On 24 November 2013, Cruz announced his fourth studio album, #Black via his Instagram, Facebook, and Twitter pages.

On 21 June 2014, Cruz released a new track titled "Don't You Dare" produced by Dr. Luke for his upcoming #Black album.

On 27 April 2015, Cruz released his first single in two years. "Do What You Like", produced by Taio and the Grammy Award-winning production team, The Monsters & The Strangerz, was fully released on 24 July 2015 through a joint venture between the multinational Cruz owned venture capital company, Tourean and Kobalt Music Group. The "Do What You Like" full release features remixes by Bel Air, Billy Da Kid, KREAM and Zoo Station. "Do What You Like" is the first single from Cruz's Roses Collection. According to his biography, Cruz will henceforth release collections of singles; rejecting the outdated album format. Cruz called this particular collection Roses, "because every rose is unique". Roses will consist of around ten tracks, each with its own lifecycle.

On 4 December 2015, Tujamo re-released his song "Booty Bounce", featuring vocals from Cruz.

On 10 November 2017, Cruz released his first song in two years, titled "Row the Body", via Warner Bros. Records. The single features rapper French Montana.

On 6 September 2019, Cruz released "Time For You", which features Wonder Stereo.

== Writing and production ==
Cruz has written songs on albums by Cheryl, JLS, The Saturdays, The Wanted and David Guetta. Cruz wrote and featured on Tinchy Stryder's hit single "Take Me Back". Pop rock band McFly recorded "Shine a Light" which not only features, but was also penned and produced by Cruz for their fifth studio album. Cruz also penned Jennifer Lopez's 2011 single "I'm Into You", featuring Lil Wayne. He also contributed significantly to David Guetta's fifth album Nothing but the Beat, penning two of his hit singles "Without You", featuring Usher and "Little Bad Girl", featuring Cruz and Ludacris. He also wrote "Mechanics of the Heart" for Cheryl's album A Million Lights. In 2025, he co-wrote "Dopamine", the lead single for Robyn's Sexistential album.

== Other ventures ==
=== RXTR/Rokstarr brand ===
On 1 September 2009, Cruz launched the brand Rokstarr, a fashion and accessories brand which had a focus on sunglasses. Speaking in October to R&B writer Pete Lewis, Cruz promoted his brand: "There's a load of US celebrities that are all rocking the sunglasses already—Kid Cudi, Justin Timberlake, Kanye West.... Then in the UK we have The Saturdays, JLS, Daniel Merriweather—who've all been twittering and writing on their blogs how much they love them. So yeah, it's definitely my new album 'Rokstarr' and the fashion brand that are my two main focuses at the moment."

Meanwhile, speaking again to Lewis in April 2010, Cruz gave his brand more free publicity: "We're currently looking to expand the brand and possibly go into things like watches. I've also got a new subsidiary of Rokstarr called 'Rok By Rokstarr'. And we've just started doing things like jeans and T-shirts, and stuff that more of the fans of Taio Cruz can buy. Because with Rokstarr in itself being so expensive, a lot of the kids out there who want to buy Rokstarr things can't. So we're bringing in stuff that's a little bit more High Street and more affordable."

In 2012 the brand was renamed to RXTR, a backronym for Riots and Twelve Rebels. The new name came along with new products, watches, which were immediately stocked at Selfridges on Oxford Street in London.

As of 2015, the RXTR website redirects to Cruz's artist website.

=== Philanthropy ===
Cruz filmed a public service announcement with Little Kids Rock, a national nonprofit that works to restore and revitalize music education in disadvantaged U.S. public schools.

== Discography ==
- Departure (2008)
- Rokstarr (2009)
- TY.O (2011)

== Writer discography ==
- Nitin Sawhney, "Rainfall"
- Tinchy Stryder, "Never Leave You"
- Tinchy Stryder, "Take Me Back" (with Stryder)
- Tinchy Stryder, "Second Chance" (with Stryder)
- McFly, "Shine a Light"
- Nightcrawlers, "Cryin' Over You" (with Nightcrawlers)
- David Guetta, "Little Bad Girl" (with Guetta & Ludacris)
- David Guetta, "Without You" (featuring Usher)
- Jennifer Lopez, "I'm Into You" (featuring Lil Wayne)
- Will Young, "Your Game" (Credited as Tayo Onile-Ere)
- The Wanted, "Made"
- Cheryl Cole, "Stand Up"
- Cheryl Cole, "Mechanics of the Heart"
- Cody Simpson, "Wish U Were Here"
- Keshia Chanté, "Set U Free"
- Nick Jonas, "I Want You"
- Olly Murs, "Kiss Me"
- Robyn, "Dopamine"

== Awards and nominations ==
Year	Award	Category	Work	Result
2004	Brit Awards	Best British Song	"Your Game"	Won
2008	MOBO Awards	Best UK Male		Nominated
2010	American Music Awards	Breakthrough Artist		Won
2010	Brit Awards	Best British Song	"Break Your Heart"	Nominated
2010	iTunes Best Album & Song	Best Song	"Dynamite"	Nominated
2010	Premios 40 Principales	Best International Song	"Break Your Heart"	Nominated
2010	ASCAP Awards	Ascap Vanguard Award	Departure	Won
2010	Teen Choice Awards	Choice Summer Music Star: Male		Nominated
2011	Brit Awards	Best British Song	"Dynamite"	Nominated
2011	Virgin Media Awards	Best Male		Nominated
2011	Virgin Media Awards	Best Collaboration	"Dirty Picture"	Nominated
2011	Virgin Media Awards	Best Video	"Dirty Picture"	Nominated
2011	Billboard Awards	Top New Artist		Nominated
2011	Billboard Awards	Top Hot 100 Song	"Dynamite"	Won
2011	Billboard Awards	Top Pop Song	"Dynamite"	Won
2011	Billboard Awards	Top Digital Song	"Dynamite"	Won
2011	Billboard Awards	Top Radio Song	"Dynamite"	Nominated
2011	Billboard Awards	Top Streaming Song	"Dynamite"	Nominated
2011	2011 MuchMusic Video Awards	MuchMusic.com Most Watched Video	"Dynamite"	Won
2011	ASCAP Awards	Song Of The Year	"Dynamite"	Won
2012	ASCAP Awards	(Honoured) Most Performed Song	"Dynamite"	Won
2012	ASCAP Awards	(Honoured) Most Performed Song	"Without You"	Won
