= I Just Wanna Know =

2006 single by Taio Cruz

Single by Taio Cruz

from the album Departure
- B-side: "Backseat Love"
- Released: 4 November 2006
- Recorded: 2006
- Genre: R&B
- Length: 3:57
- Label: Island
- Songwriter: Taio Cruz
- Producer: Taio Cruz

Taio Cruz singles chronology
"I Just Wanna Know" (2006)	"Moving On" (2007)

"I Just Wanna Know" is the debut single written and produced by English singer and songwriter Taio Cruz. "I Just Wanna Know" was released as the lead single from Cruz's debut studio album Departure (2008). The single was released on 4 November 2006, via digital download, and two days later physically. It charted on the UK Singles Chart at #29. Despite having a lower peak position than his second single, "Moving On", "I Just Wanna Know" managed six weeks inside the UK top 75 compared to the four weeks "Moving On" charted for. The single is the only of Cruz's releases to be made available on two physical single formats. The B-side, "Backseat Love", features rapper Erick Sermon.

== Music video ==
The music video for "I Just Wanna Know" lasts for a total length of three minutes and forty-four seconds. The video depicts Cruz performing the song at a country house, surrounded by a posse of guests, who have turned up for a dinner party. It also depicts Cruz reflecting on the events of the party the following day. Although the video premiered in October 2006, it was not uploaded to Cruz' official YouTube account until 26 June 2009.

== Track listing ==
- Digital download
1. "I Just Wanna Know" (Radio Edit) – 3:35
- Digital download – Amazon Exclusive
1. "I Just Wanna Know" (Wookie Acoustic Mix) – 4:05
- UK CD1 and Digital single
1. "I Just Wanna Know" (Radio Edit) – 3:35
2. "Backseat Love" (featuring Erick Sermon) – 3:43
- UK CD2 and Digital EP
1. "I Just Wanna Know" (Album Version) – 3:59
2. "I Just Wanna Know" (Wookie's Funk'd Out Mix) – 6:39
3. "I Just Wanna Know" (Bimbo Jones Vocal Mix) – 5:53
4. "I Just Wanna Know" (The Paduans Remix) – 4:15

== Charts ==
Chart (2006)	Peak position
UK Singles (Official Charts)	29
UK Hip Hop/R&B (Official Charts)	2

== I Just Wanna Know '08 ==
"I Just Wanna Know '08"

Single by Taio Cruz

from the album Departure
- B-side: "She's Like a Star"
- Released: 10 November 2008
- Recorded: 2006
- Genre: R&B
- Length: 3:35
- Label: Island
- Songwriter: Taio Cruz
- Producer: Taio Cruz

Taio Cruz singles chronology
"She's like a Star" (2008)	"I Just Wanna Know '08" (2008)	"Take Me Back" (2009)

"I Just Wanna Know '08" is a re-release of Cruz' debut single that occurred on 10 November 2008. Following the success of the singles "I Can Be" and "She's Like a Star", Island Records made the decision to re-issue "I Just Wanna Know" in an attempt to gain a higher charting position for the single. Although the single was not officially issued physically, a promotional single containing the official remix of "She's Like a Star" became widely available. Despite mass promotion, the single only managed to peak at a mediocre #90.

=== Music video ===
The music video for the re-release of "I Just Wanna Know" lasts for a total length of four minutes and six seconds. The video depicts Cruz performing the song in a social club, surrounded by a live band. The majority of footage included in the video was taken from an intimate performance given by Cruz in June 2008. Although the video premiered in October 2008, it was not uploaded to Cruz' official YouTube account until 26 June 2009.

=== Track listing ===
- Digital download
1. "I Just Wanna Know" (Radio Edit) – 3:35
- Digital EP
1. "I Just Wanna Know" (Delinquent Remix) – 3:59
2. "I Just Wanna Know" (Jim Beanz Remix) – 4:05
3. "I Just Wanna Know" (The Bimbo Jones Radio Mix) – 3:13
- Promo CD single
1. "I Just Wanna Know" (Radio Edit) – 3:35
2. "I Just Wanna Know" (Jim Beanz Remix) – 4:05
3. "She's Like a Star" (featuring Busta Rhymes and the Sugababes) – 3:44

== Charts ==
Chart (2008)	Peak position
UK Singles (Official Charts)	90

== Reception ==
DJ Chuckie called the song "a cult R&B classic".
