= Departure (Taio Cruz album) =

Studio album by Taio Cruz
- Released: 17 March 2008
- Recorded: 2006–2008
- Genre: Pop; R&B
- Length: 43:58
- Label: Island; Republic
- Producer: Taio Cruz

Taio Cruz chronology
Departure (2008)	Rokstarr (2009)

Singles from Departure
- 1. "I Just Wanna Know" Released: 6 November 2006; 2. "Moving On" Released: 10 September 2007; 3. "Come On Girl" Released: 3 March 2008; 4. "I Can Be" Released: 26 May 2008; 5. "She's Like a Star" Released: 11 August 2008; 6. "I Just Wanna Know '08" Released: 10 November 2008

Departure is the debut studio album by English singer and songwriter Taio Cruz. It was released on 17 March 2008. The album entered the UK Albums Chart at number 17.

== Background ==
In terms of his musical ambitions for the album, in February 2008 Cruz told noted UK R&B writer Pete Lewis of the award-winning Blues & Soul: "I tried to be diverse in my music while not going too far left. Before I go off and hit people with random stuff that they just wouldn't recognise, I'd rather they get to know me first! Which is why I've given them something they can relate to and won't be too difficult for them to grasp, while at the same time not making it generic. Unlike American R&B – which is often really samey a sometimes a bit obvious – I genuinely don't think my record sounds like anybody else."

== Singles ==
The first single was "I Just Wanna Know", which was released on 6 November 2006. It hit number 29 on the UK Singles Chart. The second single was "Moving On", which was released on 10 September 2007. The digital download version was released on 3 September 2007. The song did better than the first single by hitting number 26 on the UK Singles Chart. The third single, "Come On Girl" featuring Luciana, was released on 3 March 2008 and hit number 5 on the UK Singles Chart. The fourth single, "I Can Be", reached number 19 on the UK Singles Chart, dated on the chart 25 May 2008, based on downloads sales alone. It also reached number 23 on the Irish Singles Chart, again on the back of downloads. The fifth single, "She's Like a Star", was released on 11 August 2008. The song peaked at number 20 on the UK Singles Chart.

== Critical reception ==
Professional ratings
Review scores
Source	Rating
Digital Spy	3/5 stars
The Guardian	3/5 stars
Time Out London	5/6 stars

Departure earned largely positive reviews. Alex Macpherson from The Guardian wrote: "This isn't only manifest in the beats and electronic focus; the album is drenched in wonderfully camp disco strings. Cruz's own swooping vocals are most reminiscent of Seal; "Never Gonna Get Us" seems permanently on the verge of segueing into Crazy. Though somewhat lacking in low end at times (Cruz should learn about the virtues of a heavy bassline), this is a stylish, inventive debut." BBC editor Paul Clarke noted: "Most of the ballads deploy strings over their R&B rhythms, but "Come On Girl", is all crunchy electro. "Fly Away" starts with a slick electric guitar riff and "I Can Be" recalls '80s British pop soul acts like Joe Jackson or Fine Young Cannibals. Yet Departure is a much more American than British-sounding album, with Cruz's voice blurring into a mid-Atlantic burr." Digital Spy critic Nick Levine found that "this frequently impressive debut suggests Cruz can make good on his pledge, once he realises, of course, that variety is a staple ingredient of any great pop album. For now, though, Departure's combination of state-of-the-art beats and lovelorn lyrics points to a meeting with Leona Lewis' A&R man very, very soon."

== Commercial performance ==
Departure debuted and peaked at number 17 on the UK Albums Chart, with first week sales of 11,880 units. In September 2008, the album was officially certified gold by BPI by reaching sales in excess of 100,000 units.

== Track listing ==
All songs written, arranged and produced by Taio Cruz.

No.	Title	Length
1.	"I'll Never Love Again"	3:51
2.	"I Just Wanna Know"	4:00
3.	"I Can Be"	3:54
4.	"I Don't Wanna Fall in Love"	3:24
5.	"So Cold"	3:29
6.	"Fly Away"	4:05
7.	"Driving Me Crazy"	3:16
8.	"Moving On"	3:27
9.	"Come On Girl" (featuring Luciana)	3:36
10.	"Never Gonna Get Us"	3:54
11.	"She's Like a Star"	3:39
12.	"Can't Say Go"	3:23

United Kingdom and Ireland iTunes Store bonus track
No.	Title	Length
13.	"Your Game"	3:38

HMV and digital deluxe edition bonus tracks
No.	Title	Length
13.	"Come on Girl" (Delinquent Mix)	4:37
14.	"Fly Away" (Delinquent Mix)	3:57
15.	"I Can Be" (Delinquent Mix)	4:19
16.	"I Just Wanna Know" (Delinquent Mix)	3:11
17.	"I'll Never Love Again" (Delinquent Mix)	4:34

== Charts ==
Weekly chart performance for Departure
Chart (2008)	Peak position
UK Albums (OCC)	17
UK R&B Albums (OCC)	3

== Certifications ==
Certifications for Departure
Region	Certification	Certified units/sales
United Kingdom (BPI)	Gold	100,000^{^}
^{^} Shipments figures based on certification alone.
