= No Other One (song) =

Single by Taio Cruz

from the album Rokstarr
- Released: 30 November 2009
- Recorded: 2009
- Genre: R&B; electropop; dance-pop
- Length: 3:37
- Label: Island
- Songwriters: Taio Cruz; Fraser T Smith
- Producers: Taio Cruz; Fraser T Smith

Taio Cruz singles chronology
"Break Your Heart" (2009)	"No Other One" (2009)	"Dirty Picture" (2010)

"No Other One" is a single by British singer Taio Cruz, the second single from his album, Rokstarr. It was released on November 30, 2009. The song peaked at #42 on the UK Singles Chart, making it the lowest charting single from the album.

== Reception ==
The song was awarded two stars by Digital Spy, with the full review stating: "Taio Cruz's current album, Rokstarr, kicks off with a meaty portion of club bangers before drifting somewhat disjointedly into soft rock territory more familiar to Take That and Coldplay. Those more subdued songs are perhaps being saved for a later date, but for now he's sticking - or positively clinging - to the same formula that sent 'Break Your Heart' all the way to the top in September. Lots of pop artists forge their own distinct sound of course, but 'No Other One' is verging on an outright rip-off of its predecessor. Those same Europoppy synths are out in force, there's a hefty dose of Auto-Tune on Cruz's vocals and it boasts an equally repetitive hook that's sure to get stuck in your head from about 20 seconds in. Though a perfectly enjoyable effort in its own right, it can't help feeling like a bit of a comedown after the superior thumper that came before it."

== Track listing ==
- CD single and Digital download
1. "No Other One" (Radio Edit) – 3:37
2. "No Other One" (Ian Carey Remix Radio Edit) – 3:34
- Digital download – EP
1. "No Other One" (Radio Edit) – 3:37
2. "No Other One" (Ian Carey Remix Radio Edit) – 3:34
3. "Break Your Heart" (featuring Ludacris) – 3:05

== Chart performance ==
Chart (2009)	Peak position
UK Singles Chart	42
UK R&B Chart	16

== Release history ==
Region	Date	Format	Label
United Kingdom	November 29, 2009	Digital download	Island Records
United Kingdom	November 30, 2009	CD single	Island Records
