= Come On Girl =

2008 single by Taio Cruz

Single by Taio Cruz featuring Luciana

from the album Departure
- B-side: "Can't Say Go"
- Released: 3 March 2008
- Recorded: 2007
- Genre: Electro-R&B
- Length: 3:33
- Label: Island
- Songwriter: Taio Cruz
- Producer: Taio Cruz

Taio Cruz singles chronology
"Moving On" (2007)	"Come On Girl" (2008)	"I Can Be" (2008)

Luciana singles chronology
"What Planet You On?" (2008)	"Come On Girl" (2008)	"Famous" (2008)

"Come On Girl" is a song written and produced by Taio Cruz, featuring a guest vocal from singer Luciana. It is the third single from his debut studio album Departure (2008). It was his biggest hit to date, peaking at number five in the UK Singles Chart, outperforming both of his previous top 30 UK hits, until his 2009 hit "Break Your Heart", which peaked at number one. The single features the B-side "Can't Say Go", written and produced by Cruz himself.

== Background ==
Speaking in February 2008 to R&B writer Pete Lewis of the award-winning Blues & Soul, Cruz explained the reasons for the single's club influence: "Because lately I've been going to clubs where they play a lot of electro, it's definitely got a bit of that vibe in there. But, while some people might associate that driving beat with house and dance music, I've also noticed how Timbaland's latest productions on Justin Timberlake and Britney Spears have these new beats with a four-to-the-floor drum pattern too. So, because I think that's where R&B is going, I basically went in that direction while adding an English techno edge that the Americans wouldn't even know about." The music video features Cruz in a very slow car chase. Luciana also makes a guest appearance in the video.

== Track listing ==
- CD single
1. "Come on Girl" (Radio Edit) – 3:22
2. "Can't Say Go" – 3:18
3. "Come on Girl" (The Wideboys Remix) – 5:34
4. "Come on Girl" (Delinquent Remix) – 5:11
- Digital download – Radio Edit
1. "Come on Girl" (Radio Edit) – 3:22
- Digital download – Album Version
1. "Come on Girl" (Album Version) – 3:33
- Digital download – EP
1. "Come on Girl" (The Wideboys Remix) – 6:08
2. "Come on Girl" (No Rap) – 3:08
3. "Come on Girl" (Radio Edit) – 3:22
4. "Come on Girl" (Delinquent Remix) – 5:09
5. "Come on Girl" (Sticky Dirty Pop Remix) – 4:25
6. "Come on Girl" (Naughty Boy Remix) – 3:56
- Digital download – Remix single
1. "Come on Girl" (The Wideboys Radio Edit) – 3:16
2. "Come on Girl" (Delinquent Remix) – 5:09
3. "Come on Girl" (Sticky Dirty Pop Remix) – 4:25

== Charts ==
=== Weekly charts ===
Chart (2008)	Peak position
European Hot 100	22
Ireland (IRMA)	19
UK Singles (OCC)	5
UK R&B (Official Charts Company)	1

=== Year-end charts ===
Chart (2008)	Position
UK Singles (Official Charts Company)	72

== Certifications ==
Region	Certification	Certified units/sales
United Kingdom (BPI)	Silver	200,000^{‡}
^{‡} Sales+streaming figures based on certification alone.
