= Moving On (Taio Cruz song) =

Single by Taio Cruz

from the album Departure
- Released: 10 September 2007
- Recorded: 2007
- Genre: R&B
- Length: 3:13
- Label: Island
- Songwriter(s): Taio Cruz
- Producer(s): Taio Cruz

Taio Cruz singles chronology
"I Just Wanna Know" (2006)	"Moving On" (2007)	"Come On Girl" (2008)

"Moving On" is a song written and produced by Taio Cruz, and was the second single taken from his debut studio album Departure (2008). "Moving On" became his second top thirty hit, peaking at number 26 on the UK Singles Chart, outpeaking his debut single by three places. It did not, however, spend as long inside the UK top 75 as previous single "I Just Wanna Know", which had a six-week chart run, in comparison to the four-week chart run for "Moving On".

== Reception ==
In context of the review of "Departure", Digital Spy stated:

Cruz's official biography is at pains to inform us that Departure, his debut album, is not just written and performed, but arranged, produced and mixed by Cruz himself. Too clever by half he may be, but you can't blame Cruz for laying claim to the album's sonic template: with its super-sized synths, dramatic string samples and just-as-crisp-as-Timbaland beats, Departure sounds tremendous. Sadly, it's let down by an over-reliance on slow jams, with only the rock-influenced 'Fly Away' revisiting the carefree, dancefloor-friendly vibe of 'Come On Girl'. More typical is the hard-edged balladry of Cruz's early singles 'Moving On' and 'I Just Wanna Know', which combine sleek, electro-tinged production with surprisingly bleak lyrics about romantic ups, and mainly, downs.

== Track listing ==
- CD single and Digital download
1. "Moving On" (Radio Edit) - 3:13
2. "Moving On" (Alex's Club Remix) - 5:44
3. "Moving On" (Kardinal Beats Remix) - 3:47
4. "Moving On" (P*Nut Remix) - 4:17
- Digital download - Amazon exclusive
1. "Moving On" (Wookie Acoustic Mix) - 3:34

== Charts ==
Chart (2007)	Peak position
UK Singles (OCC)	26
