= I Can Be (Taio Cruz song) =

Single by Taio Cruz

from the album Departure
- B-side: "Disco Fever"
- Released: 26 May 2008
- Recorded: 2007
- Genre: R&B
- Length: 3:47
- Label: Island
- Songwriter: Taio Cruz
- Producer: Taio Cruz

Taio Cruz singles chronology
"Come On Girl" (2008)	"I Can Be" (2008)	"She's like a Star" (2008)

"I Can Be" is a song by British singer-songwriter Taio Cruz, released as the fourth single from his debut album Departure, released in May 2008. The song peaked at number 18 on the UK Singles Chart. The single's B-side, "Disco Fever", was written and recorded exclusively for the release, and featured in the television adverts for Britannia High, an ITV1 musical series broadcast in July 2008.

== Reception ==
Digital Spy gave the song three out of five stars, claiming the song's "electro beats and string samples are subtler and more graceful than Timbaland's chunky wallops" and "the ultra-confident and cliché-packed lyrics, though not to everyone's tastes, are refreshingly unpretentious."

== Track listing ==
- CD single
1. "I Can Be" (Radio Edit) – 2:52
2. "Disco Fever" – 3:22
3. "I Can Be" (Digital Dog Club Mix) – 6:18
4. "Moving On" (Rokstarr Remix) – 4:15
- Digital download
1. "I Can Be" (Radio Edit) – 2:52
2. "I Can Be" (Edit) (featuring Estelle) – 3:28
- Digital download – EP
1. "I Can Be" (Digital Dog Club Radio Edit) – 3:04
2. "I Can Be" (Digital Dog Urban Remix) – 3:37
3. "I Can Be" (Delinquent Remix) – 5:44

== Charts ==
=== Weekly charts ===
Chart (2008)	Peak position
European Hot 100	56
UK Singles (OCC)	18
UK Airplay (Music Week)	17

=== Year-end charts ===
Chart (2008)	Position
UK Singles (Official Charts Company)	150
