= Break Your Heart =

2009 single by Taio Cruz

- Original version cover

Single by Taio Cruz

from the album Rokstarr
- Released: 13 September 2009 (UK); 2 February 2010 (US)
- Recorded: 2009
- Genre: Dance-pop; electropop
- Length: 3:23 (original version); 3:05 (single version/remix with Ludacris)
- Label: Island; Mercury
- Songwriters: Taio Cruz; Fraser T. Smith; Chris Bridges (remix)
- Producers: Taio Cruz; Fraser T. Smith

Taio Cruz singles chronology
"Take Me Back" (2009)	"Break Your Heart" (2009)	"No Other One" (2009)

Music video
- "Break Your Heart" (ft. Ludacris) on YouTube

"Break Your Heart" is a song by British singer and songwriter Taio Cruz. The song serves as the lead single from his second studio album, Rokstarr (2009). It was written by Cruz and Fraser T. Smith and produced by Smith. It was first released in the United Kingdom on 20 September 2009, followed by a release in the United States and other markets on 2 February 2010. The single version features US rapper Ludacris; that version was the single released in North American countries. The song, originally penned for Cheryl Cole, is an electropop song with dance-pop elements, accompanied by Cruz's vocals. The song is lyrically a warning to someone about being a heartbreaker.

The song received mixed to positive reviews, critics commending its infectious sound, but noting that it was generic. The single entered at the top of the UK Singles Chart. Outside the United Kingdom, "Break Your Heart" topped the charts in Canada, Switzerland and the United States, and also within the top ten of the charts in many other countries, including Australia and the Netherlands. The accompanying music video features several scenes of Cruz on escapades with different women, including a speedboat compared to classic Diddy and a club scene with Ludacris in the US version.

== Background ==
"Break Your Heart" was one of two songs penned by Cruz for Cheryl Cole for her debut solo album, 3 Words. After Cruz did not hear back from Cole's label about the song, he reworked the song for a male and made it the first song off his second album, Rokstarr. Cruz told MTV News UK that after he released the song, Cole's people would have liked the song for her after all. The latter track by Cruz, "Stand Up" made it onto the final track list on Cole's album.

However, according to the song's other co-writer Fraser T Smith in an interview with HitQuarters, "Break Your Heart" was rejected by Cole's Polydor label boss Ferdy Unger-Hamilton who felt it was too similar to "Heartbreaker" by will.i.am, the executive producer of 3 Words. Smith also told This Must Be Pop: "Taio felt the lyric was a bit cocky for him to carry off – I told him he sounded great on it."

Speaking of the song's lyrical background, Cruz told Pete Lewis of Blues & Soul:

"It's about breaking a girl's heart, but in a way that's kinda not on purpose. It's more that I'm just a single guy, trying to be single and trying to remain single. And sometimes, when you are in that place, you get girls who wanna be a part of what you're about – but, because you're not really ready for a relationship, those girls can end up being heartbroken. So what I'm basically saying is 'I might just break your heart. But I'm only gonna break your heart if you come through this way right now'."

Cruz also has called his song "catchy" with a "good melody" and "fun topic", stating that "both girls and guys can get into this character". In an interview with Entertainment Weekly, Cruz elaborated and said the song was partially based on a personal situation, and rather an "exaggeration of an experience".

The success of the song in the United Kingdom attracted the attention of David Massey and Daniel Werner from Mercury/Island Def Jam who were excited and aggressive about releasing "Break Your Heart" in the United States on their label. According to Cruz's manager Jamie Binns, the relationship with Monte Lipman at Universal Republic had "gone a bit quiet" by this point and as Taio wanted to be with the label that was most enthusiastic about his music, a move from Universal Republic to Mercury/Island Def Jam was engineered. Massey and Werner's belief in the single's potential within the United States and relentless promotional push they gave it helped the song reach the Billboard Hot 100 top spot.

=== Ludacris remix ===
In addition to re-working his album for a US release, Cruz tapped US rapper Ludacris on a remix for the US version of "Break Your Heart". According to Cruz's manager Jamie Binns, Mercury Records president David Massey had suggested that to introduce Cruz to the American market, the single should feature an American rapper with chart credibility. Massey and Mercury A&R manager Daniel Werner engineered an introduction with Ludacris' manager Jeff Dixon, who then played the song to Ludacris, who loved the track and within a week his contribution was complete.

On collaborating with Ludacris, Cruz said, "With Ludacris, pretty much every track he's ever featured on sounds amazing. I gave him a quick call and asked him if he could get on the record, and he recorded it and sent it over. As I expected, there was nothing I needed to change. It sounded perfect. He put my name in there, which is great – so people know to pronounce it now properly, hopefully." The version featuring Ludacris was originally released digitally as the b-side to "No Other One" in November 2009, before in the United States in February 2010.

== Composition ==
"Break Your Heart" (Remix)
A 31-second sample of the remix version of "Break Your Heart" featuring Cruz's vocals and Ludacris' rap-intro.

"Break Your Heart" is an electropop song featuring a "surging dance-pop" sound, accompanied with Cruz's Auto-Tuned R&B vocals. It is written in the key of E♭ major described as a "medium dance groove", Cruz's vocals span from B♭_{3} to B♭_{4}, and it's tempo has 122 beats per minute. According to Jason Draper of Yahoo! Music UK, the song is a mix of European and American urban music. It includes several tempo changes, which have been compared to that of Jay Sean's "Down". The song is filled with boasting lyrics about being a heartbreaker rather than being heartbroken.

== Critical reception ==
Although BBC Music called the song a "cheese-fest", the reviewer said "in a weird way it's kind of beautiful", investing in the "Ibiza-inspired R&B trend". The review also compared the song to Dizzee Rascal and Cruz's "layered vocals" and "slick production" to OneRepublic and Timbaland's "Apologize". Michael Menachem of Billboard said that the "stateside version" turns up the heat with Ludacris' feature as "Cruz's breezy vocals on this electro-pop number have all the warmth of smooth R&B, while producer Fraser T Smith sets up the right ratio of catchy vocals and tempo changes to make a hit". Ash Dosanjh of New Musical Express said that Cruz's downfall was when he acts the player, as on "Break Your Heart" and "Dirty Picture". Caroline Sullivan of The Guardian said Cruz was "proficient but generic" in the song, but his "autotuned vocals could have been anyone's, and this facelessness is a problem Cruz rarely surmounts." Chris Ryan of MTV Buzzworthy said that the song "perfectly embodies Cruz's infectious, dancefloor-friendly sound and sleek, immaculate production", and compares it to Jason Derulo and Akon.

== Chart performance ==
"Break Your Heart" entered at the top of the UK Singles Chart on 20 September 2009 – for the week ending dated 26 September 2009 – becoming Cruz's first single to do so. The song remained at the top of the chart for three weeks. The song also peaked at number one in Switzerland, and in the top ten in several other countries across Europe.

In Australia, the Ludacris remix of the single peaked at number two on the ARIA Singles Chart.

In the United States, the Ludacris remix of "Break Your Heart" entered at number fifty-three on the Billboard Hot 100. The following week, the single jumped from number fifty-three to the top of the chart, Cruz also set the record for largest jump to the top of the chart by a debut act. The record was previously held by US singer Kelly Clarkson, who jumped from 52 to one with her American Idol coronation song, "A Moment Like This", and who also holds the record for the biggest non-debut jump on the chart, moving from 97 to one with "My Life Would Suck Without You". It originally moved 31,000 digital copies in the United States for a partial sales week prompting its original Hot 100 entry, and shifted 273,000 downloads in its first full week of availability, claiming the top debut on Hot Digital Songs. It also marked Ludacris' fifth number one song. The song eventually dominated US airplay also, peaking at number one on the Mainstream Top 40 chart. Cruz became the twelfth male artist to have his first solo single peak at the top of the chart, and was the third since October 2008, following Jay Sean and Jason Derulo. By August 2012, "Break Your Heart" had sold 3,712,000 digital copies in the United States.

== Music video ==
Cruz and his girlfriend on a speedboat in the music video.

The original music video was filmed in Sotogrande, Spain in July 2009, with new parts filmed in Miami, United States in February 2010 to include Ludacris, resulting in two versions of the video.

The video begins with Cruz and his girlfriend, played by Uzbekistan-born supermodel Nadya Nepomnyashaya, sitting together in a sports car near a pier. She tells him "You know I'm just gonna hurt you." Cruz responds by saying "You know I'm only gonna break your heart, right?" She says "You want a bet?" and he says "Bring It On." They then exit the car, walk down the pier and enter a nearby speedboat. Scenes are then shown in several different venues, including a club, a boat, a beachfront party, the speedboat and a hotel room. Throughout the video, Cruz is on escapades with different women and his girlfriend on escapades with other men. The video ends with Cruz's girlfriend laughing at his attempts to break her heart and then the two get off the boat they are on and go back onto the speedboat. For the version with Ludacris, there are scenes with him and Cruz in a white concrete backdrop with a flashing light, as well as the two of them together with a large group of people in another club.

When asked if Diddy was an influence on the video, Cruz said "Probably on some kind of subconscious level. I just love supermodels, I love sunshine, and I love sports cars. And this time we also added a speedboat. So you got the four S's in there." In an interview with Rap-Up, when talking about the video portraying him as a heartbreaker, Cruz said "No, not really. I suppose maybe 20%. It was more of just playing a character and having fun, just going out there and making a real cool, fun, cocky video. Not everyone has seen the whole plot of the video, but it's actually myself and my girlfriend both going out with the intention of breaking everyone's hearts."

== Covers and other uses ==
"Weird Al" Yankovic included the chorus in his polka medley "Polka Face" from his 2011 album Alpocalypse. Violinist Lindsey Stirling used the song to perform to on America's Got Talent.

It was also covered by Blondie whilst on the European Leg of 2010 Endangered Species Tour.

== Track listing ==
- German CD single
1. "Break Your Heart" (featuring Ludacris) – 3:05
2. "Break Your Heart" (The Wideboys Remix Radio Edit) – 3:46
- UK CD single
1. "Break Your Heart" – 3:23
2. "Break Your Heart" (Vito Benito FF Radio Remix) – 3:22
3. "Break Your Heart" (Paul Thomas Remix) – 7:41
4. "Break Your Heart" (Cassette Club Remix) – 7:22
- Digital download
1. "Break Your Heart" – 3:23
2. "Break Your Heart" (Paul Thomas Remix) – 7:41
- Digital download – EP
1. "Break Your Heart" (Vito Benito FF Radio Remix) – 3:22
2. "Break Your Heart" (Cassette Club Remix) – 7:22
3. "Break Your Heart" (Agent X Remix) – 4:27

== Credits and personnel ==
Credits adapted from the album liner notes.

- Songwriting – Taio Cruz, Fraser T. Smith (and Chris Bridges for remixed version)
- Producing – Taio Cruz, Fraser T. Smith
- Engineering – Beatriz Artola
- Mixing – Fraser T. Smith
- Mastering – Dick Beetham

== Charts ==
=== Weekly charts ===
Chart (2009–2010)	Peak position
Australia (ARIA)	2
Austria (Ö3 Austria Top 40)	10
Belgium (Ultratop 50 Flanders)	3
Belgium (Ultratop 50 Wallonia)	2
Canada Hot 100 (Billboard)	1
CIS Airplay (TopHit)	8
Czech Republic Airplay (ČNS IFPI)	3
Denmark (Tracklisten)	36
Europe (European Hot 100 Singles)	2
Finland (Suomen virallinen lista)	4
France (SNEP)	2
Germany (GfK)	5
Hungary (Rádiós Top 40)	2
Ireland (IRMA)	2
Japan (Japan Hot 100)	4
Mexico Anglo (Monitor Latino)	6
Netherlands (Dutch Top 40)	8
Netherlands (Single Top 100)	21
New Zealand (Recorded Music NZ)	17
Norway (VG-lista)	7
Russia Airplay (TopHit)	10
Slovakia Airplay (ČNS IFPI)	3
Spain (Promusicae)	19
Sweden (Sverigetopplistan)	6
Switzerland (Schweizer Hitparade)	1
UK Singles (Official Charts)	1
UK Hip Hop/R&B (Official Charts)	1
US Billboard Hot 100	1
US Adult Contemporary (Billboard)	24
US Adult Pop Airplay (Billboard)	18
US Dance Club Songs (Billboard)	5
US Pop Airplay (Billboard)	1
US Rhythmic Airplay (Billboard)	3

Chart (2025)	Peak position
Poland (Polish Airplay Top 100)	56

2026 weekly chart performance
Chart (2026)	Peak position
Finland Airplay (Radiosoittolista)	89

=== Monthly charts ===
Chart (2010)	Peak position
Brazil (Brasil Hot 100 Airplay)	40
Brazil (Brasil Hot Pop Songs)	14

=== Year-end charts ===
Chart (2009)	Position
CIS (TopHit)	191
Russia Airplay (TopHit)	101
UK Singles (OCC)	37

Chart (2010)	Position
Australia (ARIA)	31
Austria (Ö3 Austria Top 40)	32
Belgium (Ultratop 50 Flanders)	30
Belgium (Ultratop 50 Wallonia)	18
Brazil (Crowley)	100
Canada (Canadian Hot 100)	5
CIS (TopHit)	39
France (SNEP)	18
Germany (Official German Charts)	23
Hungary (Rádiós Top 40)	25
Netherlands (Dutch Top 40)	36
Netherlands (Single Top 100)	84
Romania (Romanian Top 100)	72
Russia Airplay (TopHit)	58
Sweden (Sverigetopplistan)	28
Switzerland (Schweizer Hitparade)	9
US Billboard Hot 100	10
US Mainstream Top 40 (Billboard)	7
US Rhythmic (Billboard)	14

=== Decade-end charts ===
Chart (2010–2019)	Position
US Billboard Hot 100	97

== Certifications ==
Certifications for "Break Your Heart"
Region	Certification	Certified units/sales
Australia (ARIA)	2× Platinum	140,000^{^}
Austria (IFPI Austria)	Gold	15,000^{*}
Belgium (BRMA)	Gold	15,000^{*}
Brazil (Pro-Música Brasil)	Platinum	60,000^{‡}
Canada (Music Canada)	3× Platinum	240,000^{*}
Denmark (IFPI Danmark)	Platinum	90,000^{‡}
Germany (BVMI)	2× Platinum	600,000^{‡}
Italy (FIMI)	Gold	50,000^{‡}
New Zealand (RMNZ)	Platinum	30,000^{‡}
Spain (Promusicae) Ludacris remix	Gold	30,000^{‡}
Sweden (GLF)	Gold	20,000^{‡}
Switzerland (IFPI Switzerland)	2× Platinum	60,000^{^}
United Kingdom (BPI)	2× Platinum	1,200,000^{‡}
United States (RIAA)	3× Platinum	3,712,000
^{*} Sales figures based on certification alone.^{^} Shipments figures based on certification alone.^{‡} Sales+streaming figures based on certification alone.

== Release history ==
Region	Date	Format	Label
United Kingdom	13 September 2009	Digital download	Island
United Kingdom	14 September 2009	CD single	Island
United States	2 February 2010	Mainstream and rhythmic airplay	Mercury
United States	25 February 2010	Digital download	Mercury
United States	11 May 2010	Urban airplay	Mercury

== See also ==
- List of UK Singles Chart number ones of the 2000s
- List of UK R&B Singles Chart number ones of 2009
- List of Billboard Hot 100 number-one singles of the 2010s
- List of Billboard Mainstream Top 40 number-one songs of 2010
- List of number-one dance airplay hits of 2010 (U.S.)
- List of Canadian Hot 100 number-one singles of 2010
- List of number-one hits of 2010 (Switzerland)
