= The Voice Belgique =

Television program

- Created by: John de Mol Jr. Roel van Velzen
- Presented by: Current; Jérémie Baise (12–); Former; Maureen Louys (1–11); Adrien Devyver (backstage; 1–3); Walid (backstage; 4–6); Cécile Djunga (backstage; 7); Fanny Jandrain (Blinds–Battles; 10)
- Judges: Current; Christophe Willem (10–); Loïc Nottet (9, 12–); Axelle Red (12–); Hoshi (12–); Former; Lio (1); Joshua (1); Quentin Mosimann (1–2, 5–6); Beverly Jo Scott (1–7, 9–11); Natasha St-Pier (2–3); Marc Pinilla (2–3, 6); Bastian Baker (3); Jali (4); Stanislas (4–5); Chimène Badi (4); Cats on Trees (5); Bigflo & Oli (6); Matthew Irons (7–8); Slimane Nebchi (7–8); Vitaa (7–8); Henri PFR (9); Typh Barrow (8–10); Black M (10); Mentissa (11); Hatik (11)
- Country of origin: Belgium
- Original language: French
- No. of series: 12
- No. of episodes: 112

Production
- Producer: Talpa Media Group
- Production companies: Talpa Media Group (2011–2019); ITV Studios (2021–present)

Original release
- Network: La Une & VivaCité
- Release: 20 December 2011 – present

Related
- The Voice Kids Belgique; The Voice (franchise)

The Voice Belgique is a Francophone Belgian reality television singing competition. The TV show is part of the international The Voice franchise that started in the Netherlands as The Voice of Holland. It began on 20 December 2011, one month after its Flemish Belgian counterpart, The Voice van Vlaanderen went on air. It is currently airing on La Une from RTBF network.

One of the important premises of the show is the quality of the singing talent. Four coaches, themselves popular performing artists, train the talents in their group and occasionally perform with them. Talents are selected in blind auditions, where the coaches cannot see, but only hear the auditioner.

The original panel featured Quentin Mosimann, Lio, duo from Joshua and Beverly Jo Scott; the panel for the most recent twelfth season featured Loïc Nottet, Christophe Willem, Hoshi and Axelle Red. Coaches that have made an appearance in previous seasons include Marc Pinilla, Natasha St-Pier, Bastian Baker, Jali, Stanislas, Chimène Badi, Cats on Trees, Bigflo & Oli, Matthew Irons, Slimane Nebchi, Vitaa, Typh Barrow, Henri PFR, Black M, Mentissa and Hatik.

== Format ==
Logo used in the previous seasons.

The series consists of three phases: a blind audition, a battle phase, and live performance shows. Four judges/coaches, all noteworthy recording artists, choose teams of contestants through a blind audition process. Each judge has the length of the auditioner's performance (about one minute) to decide if he or she wants that singer on his or her team; if two or more judges want the same singer (as happens frequently), the singer has the final choice of coach.

Each team of singers is mentored and developed by its respective coach. In the second stage, called the battle phase, coaches have two of their team members battle against each other directly by singing the same song together, with the coach choosing which team member to advance from each of four individual "battles" into the first live round. Within that first live round, the surviving four acts from each team again compete head-to-head, with public votes determining one of two acts from each team that will advance to the final eight. At the same time, the coach chooses which of the remaining three acts comprises the other performer remaining on the team.

In the final phase, the remaining contestants (Final 24) compete against each other in live broadcasts. The television audience and the coaches have an equal say (50/50) in deciding who moves on to the final 4. With one team member remaining for each coach, the (final 4) contestants compete against each other in the finale with the outcome decided solely by public vote.

== Coaches and hosts ==
=== Coaches ===
The coaches for the first season were announced to be Quentin Mosimann, Lio, the musical group Joshua and Beverly Jo Scott. Scott and Mosimann continued for the second season while Lio and Joshua were replaced by Marc Pinilla and Natasha St-Pier respectively. On 13 August 2013, it was announced that Mosimann would not be returning for the third season, while Scott, Pinilla and St-Pier would all continue as coaches. They were joined by debuting coach Bastian Baker. For the fourth season, it was announced that Scott would be the only coach returning from the previous season while Jali, Chimène Badi and Stanislas would replace Pinilla, St-Pier and Baker.

On 3 August 2015, it was announced that Scott and Stanislas would continue as coaches for the fifth season, along with Mosimann who returned after a two-season hiatus. They were joined by musical duo Cats on Trees. On 27 October 2016, it was announced that Scott and Mosimann would be back for the sixth season, while Pinilla would rejoin the panel after a two season hiatus, replacing Stanislas. They were joined by hip-hop duo Bigflo & Oli who made their debut as a coach, replacing Cats on Trees. On 28 August 2017, it was announced that only Scott would return for the seventh season while Mosimann, Pinilla and Bigflo & Oli would all be departing. Scott was instead joined by Matthew Irons, Slimane Nebchi and Vitaa. On 27 June 2018, it was announced that Irons would be returning for the eighth season. On 13 August 2018, it was confirmed that Nebchi and Vitaa would also continue as coaches. On 17 August 2018, Scott announced her departure from the show after seven seasons. On 22 August 2018, Typh Barrow was announced as Scott's replacement.

For the ninth season, Barrow continued as a coach alongside Scott, who returned after a one season hiatus. They were joined by new coaches Henri PFR and Loïc Nottet, who was previously a runner-up contestant in the third season. On 27 August 2021, it was announced that Scott and Barrow would be returning for the tenth season, while Christophe Willem and Black M would be replacing Henri PFR and Nottet. On 20 June 2023, it was announced that Scott and Willem would be returning as coaches for the eleventh. At the same time, it was confirmed that Black M and Barrow have left to join The Voice Kids. They were replaced by new coaches Hatik and Mentissa Aziza. On 6 February 2025, it was announced that of the coaches from the eleventh season, only Willem would continue for the twelfth season. Meanwhile, Nottet returned after a two season hiatus alongside new coaches Hoshi and former The Voice van Vlaanderen coach Axelle Red, replacing Scott, Hatik and Aziza.

=== Gallery ===
Coaches gallery

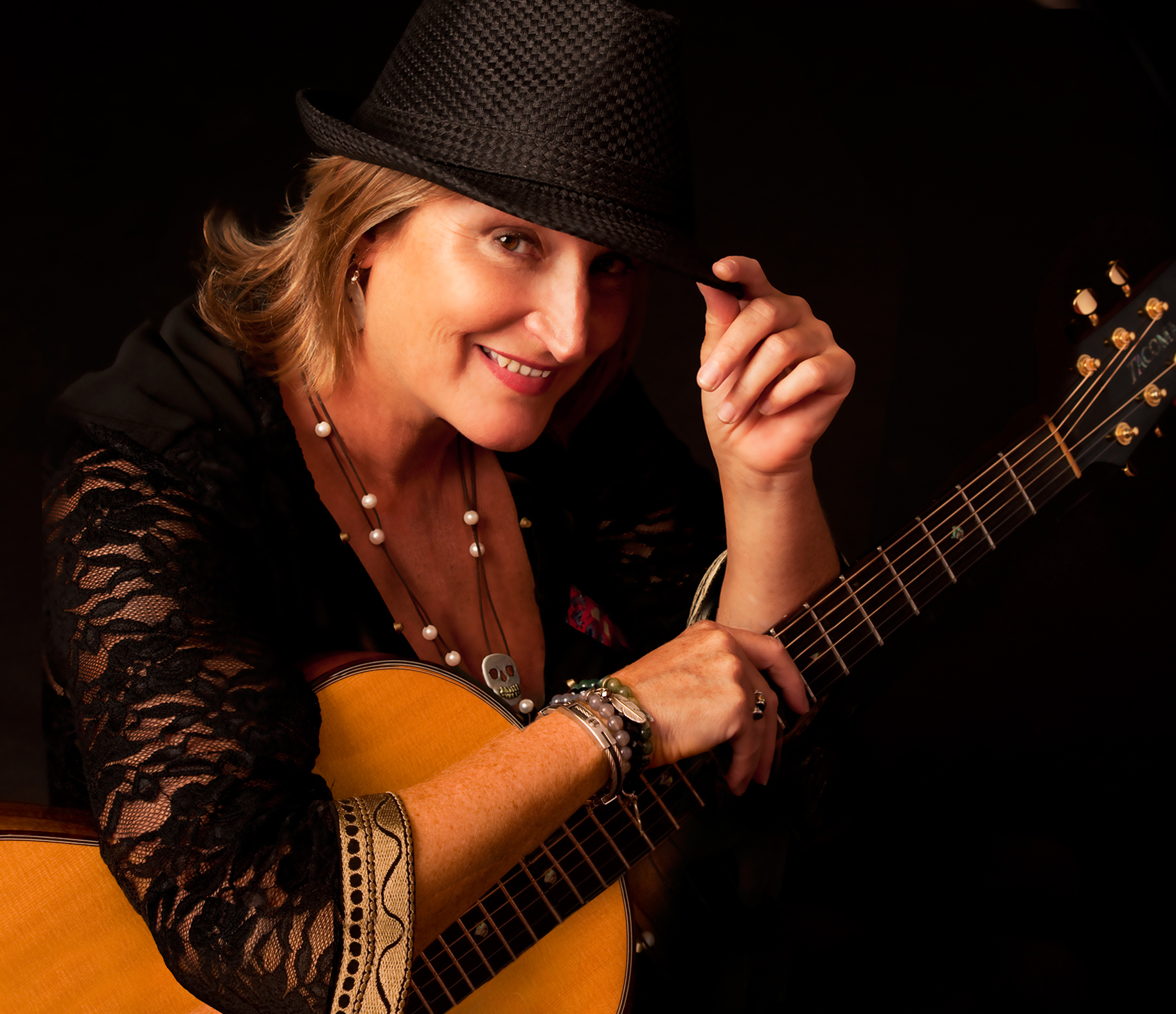
Beverly Jo Scott (2011–2018, 2020–2024)

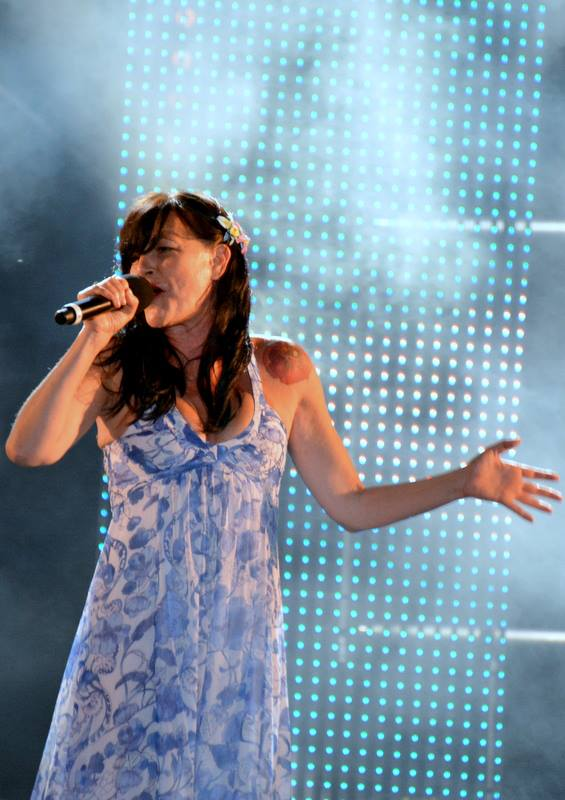
Lio (2011–2012)

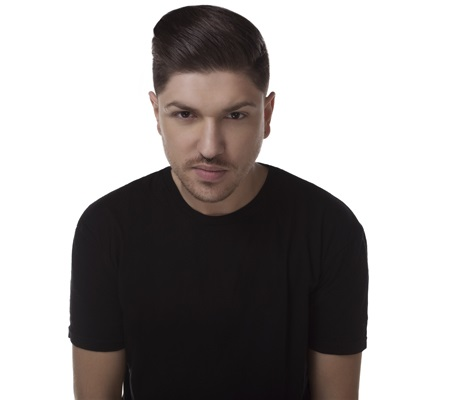
Quentin Mosimann (2011–2013, 2016–2017)

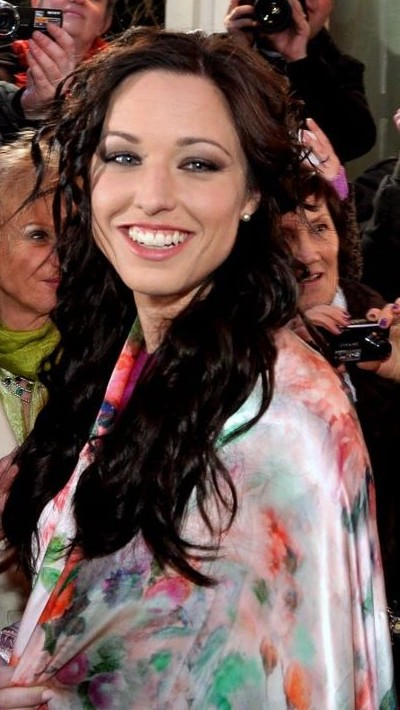
Natasha St-Pier (2013–2014)

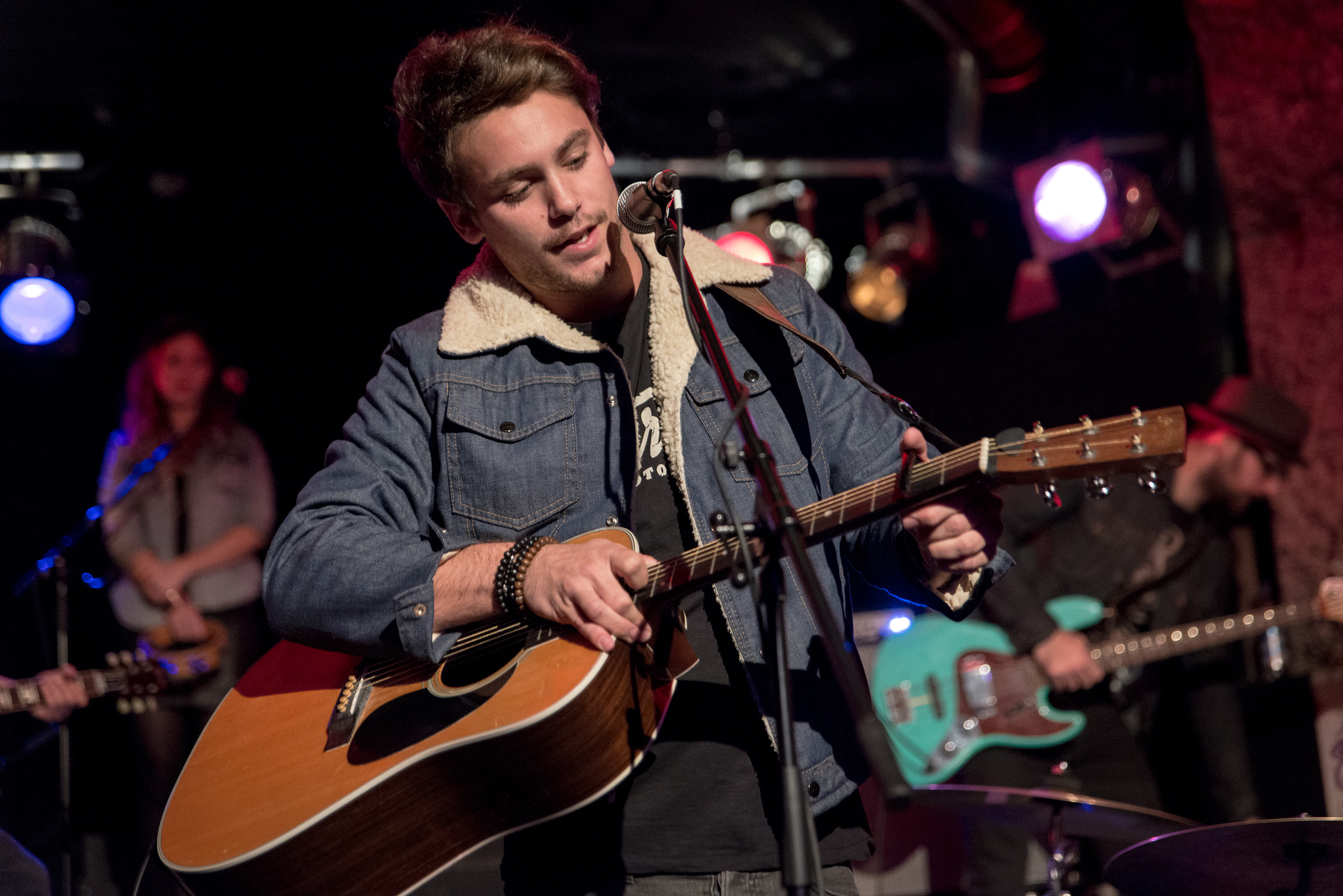
Bastian Baker (2014)

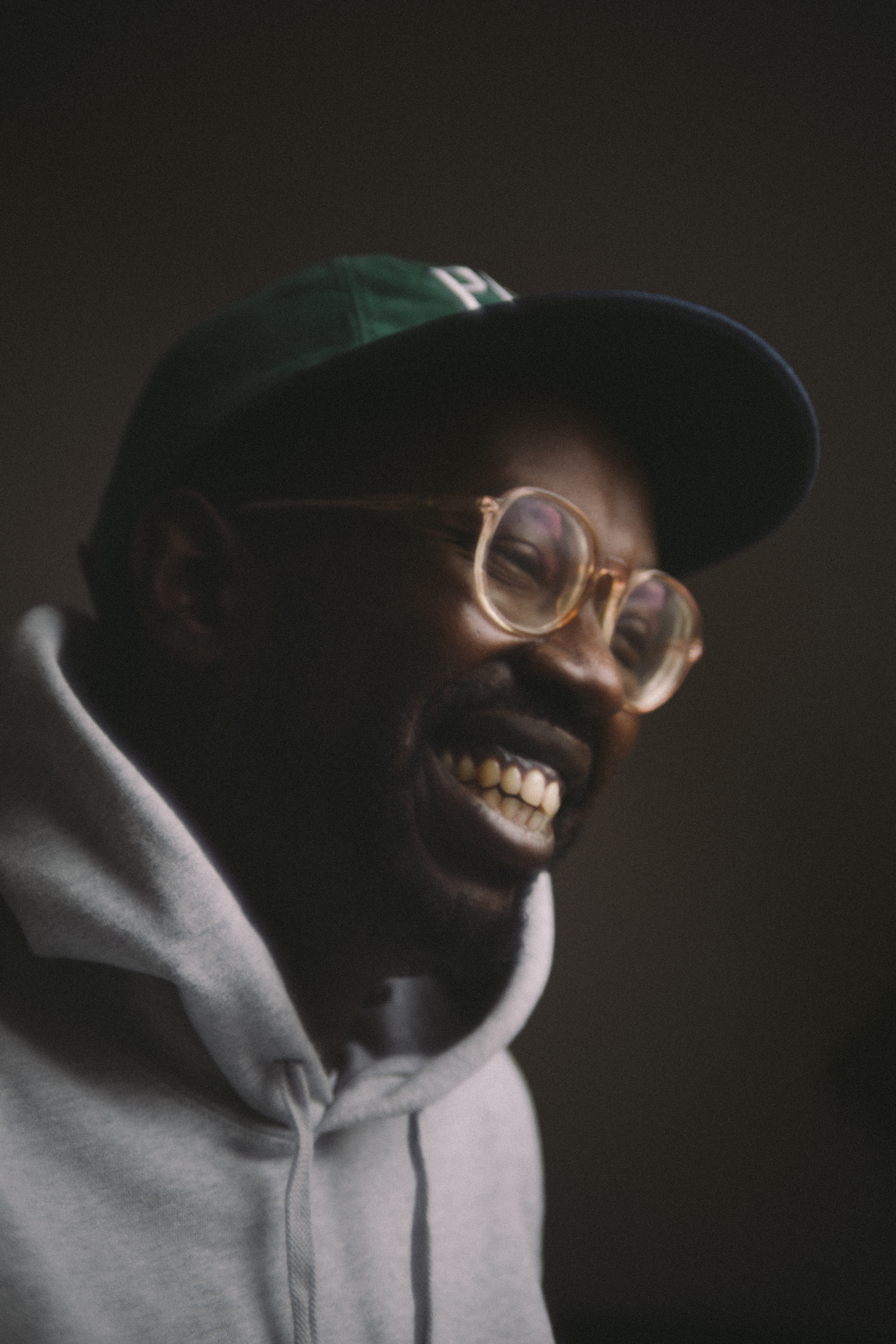
Jali (2015)

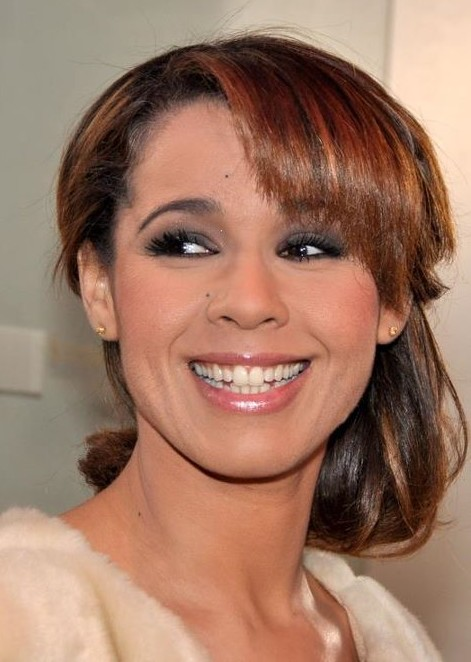
Chimène Badi (2015)

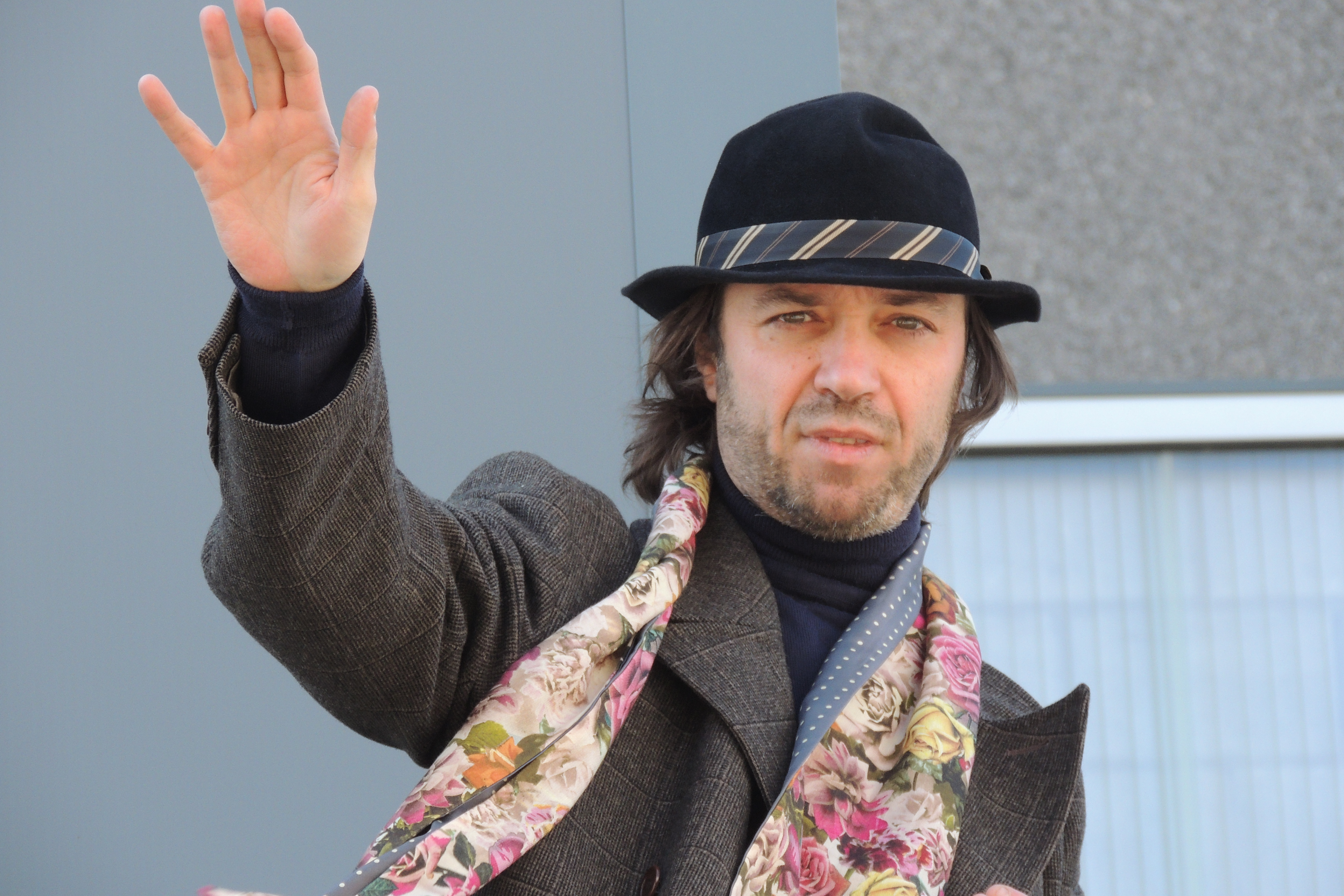
Stanislas (2015–2016)

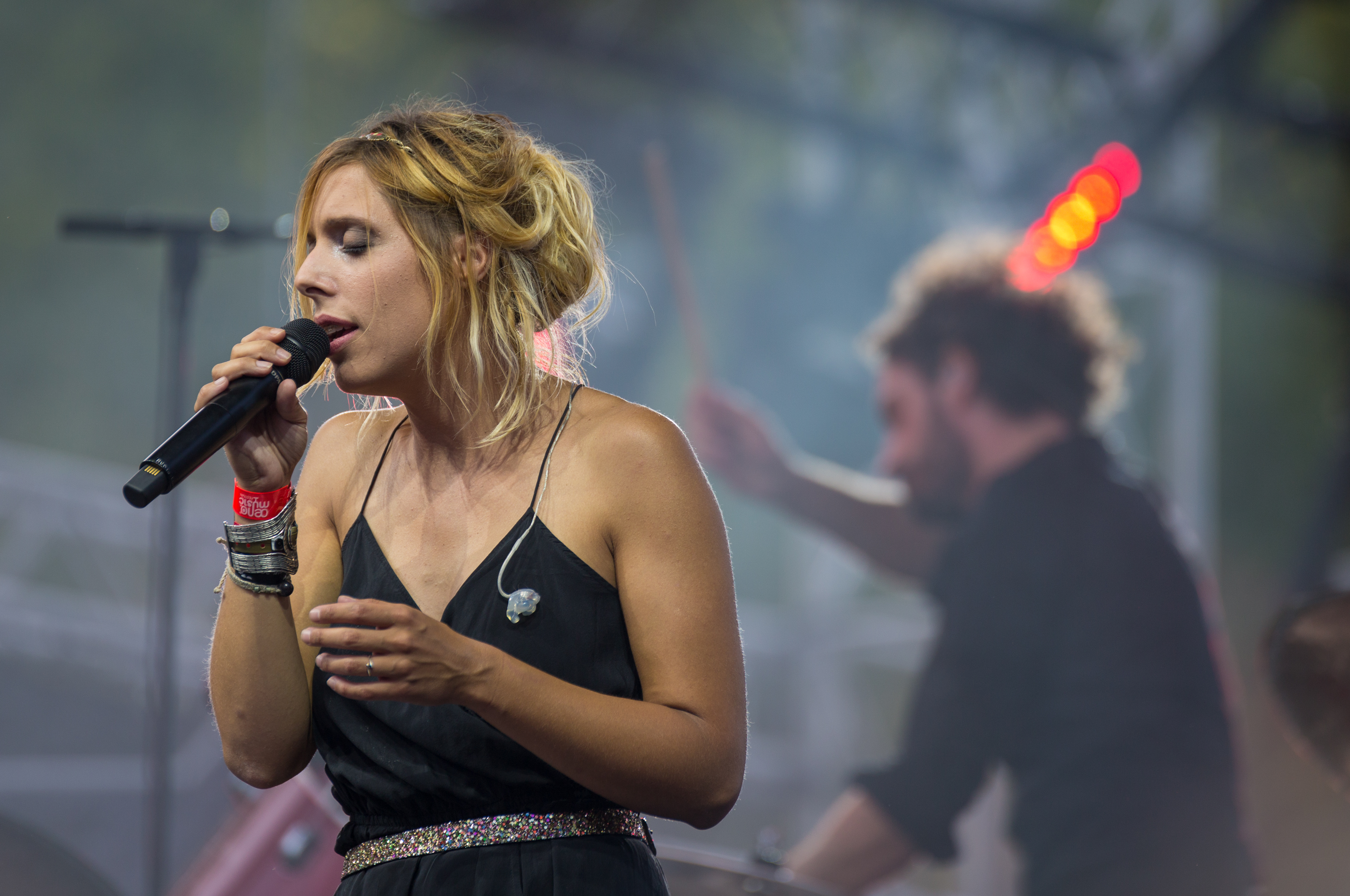
Cats on Trees (2016)

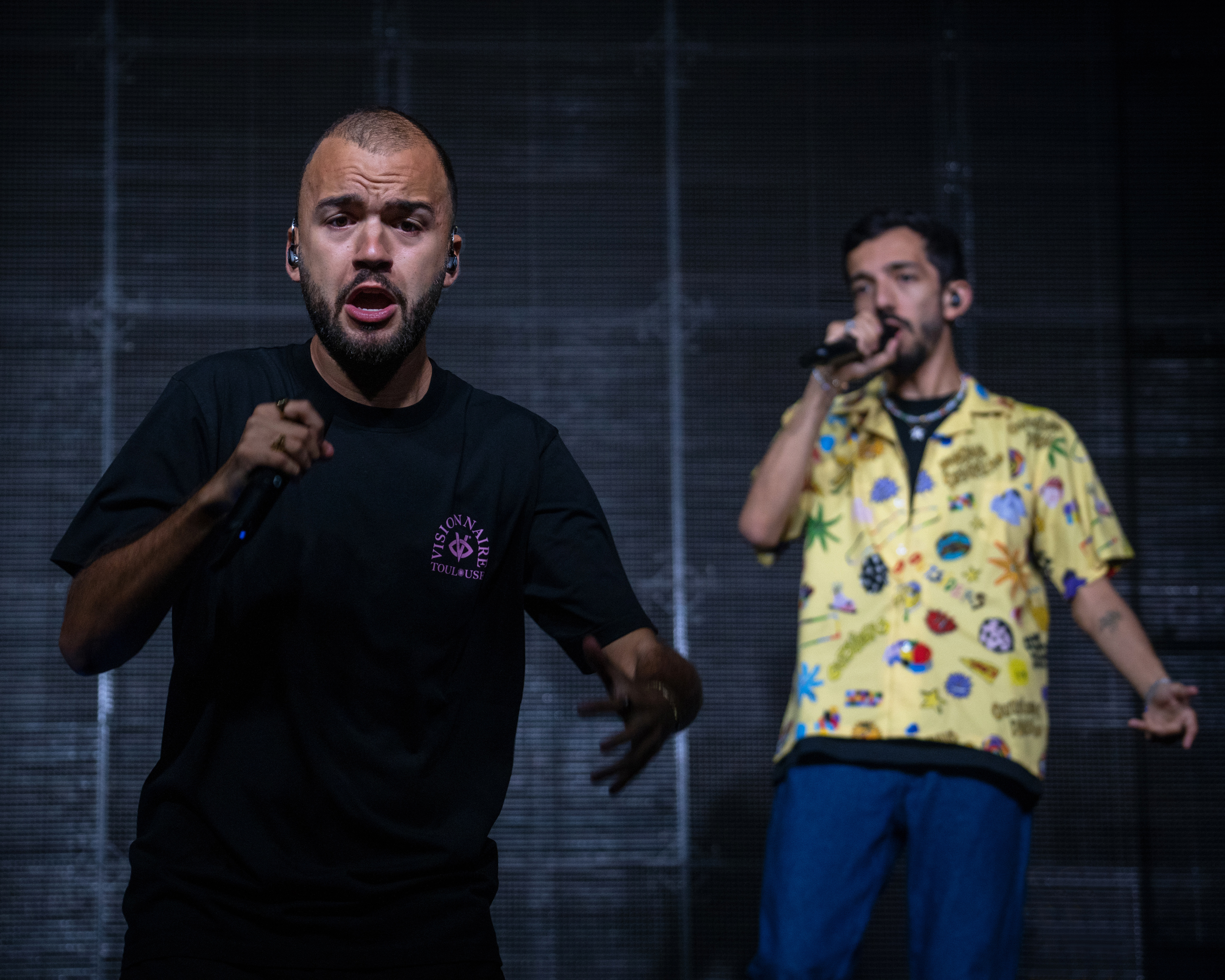
Bigflo & Oli (2017)

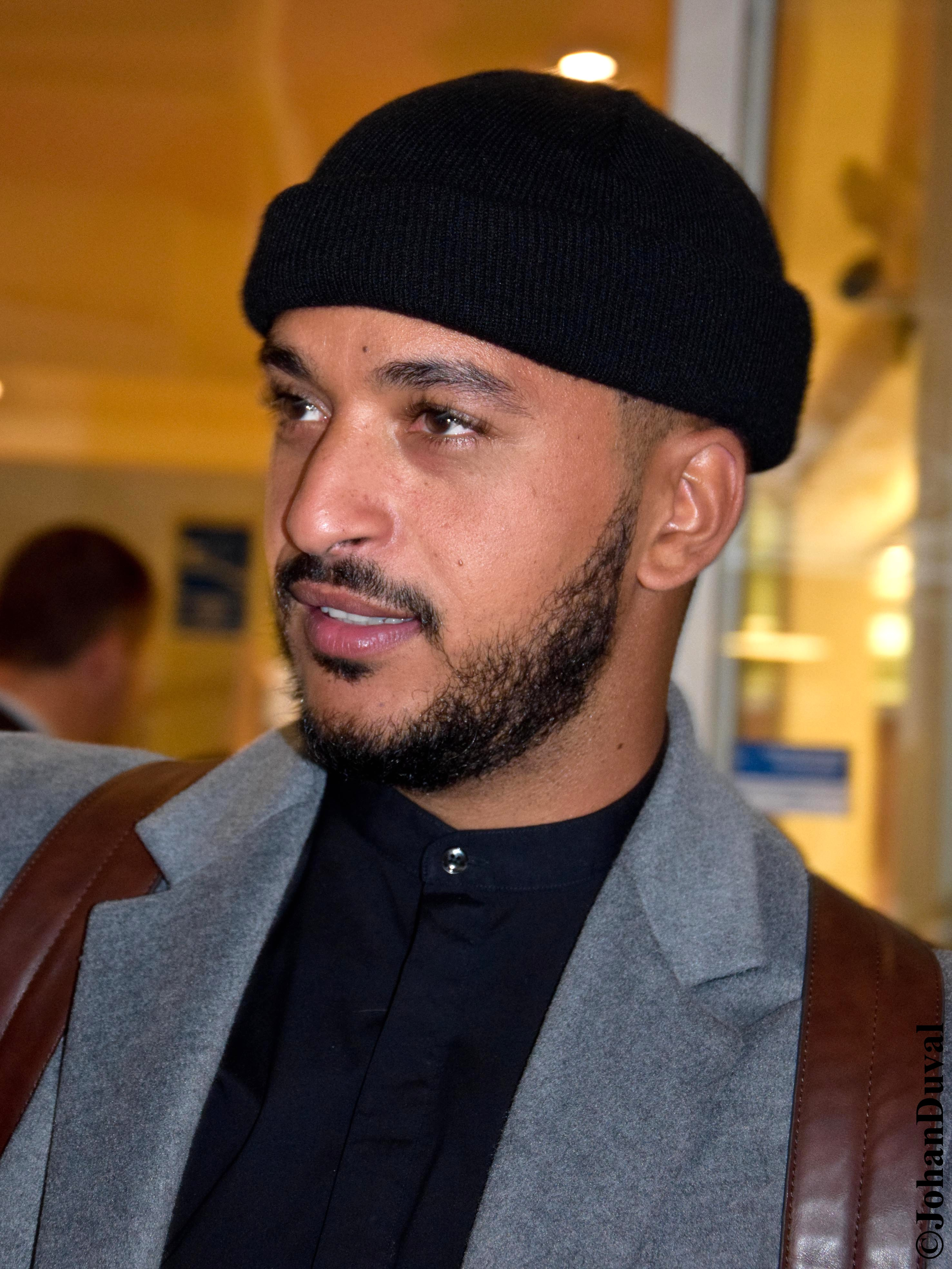
Slimane Nebchi (2018–2019)

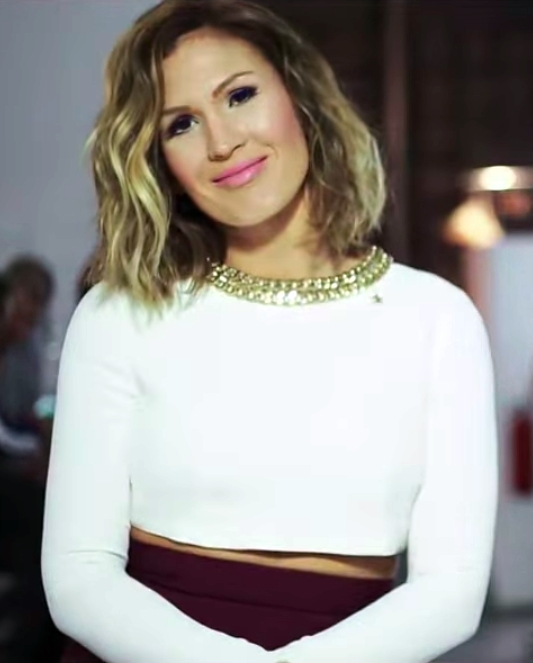
Vitaa (2018–2019)

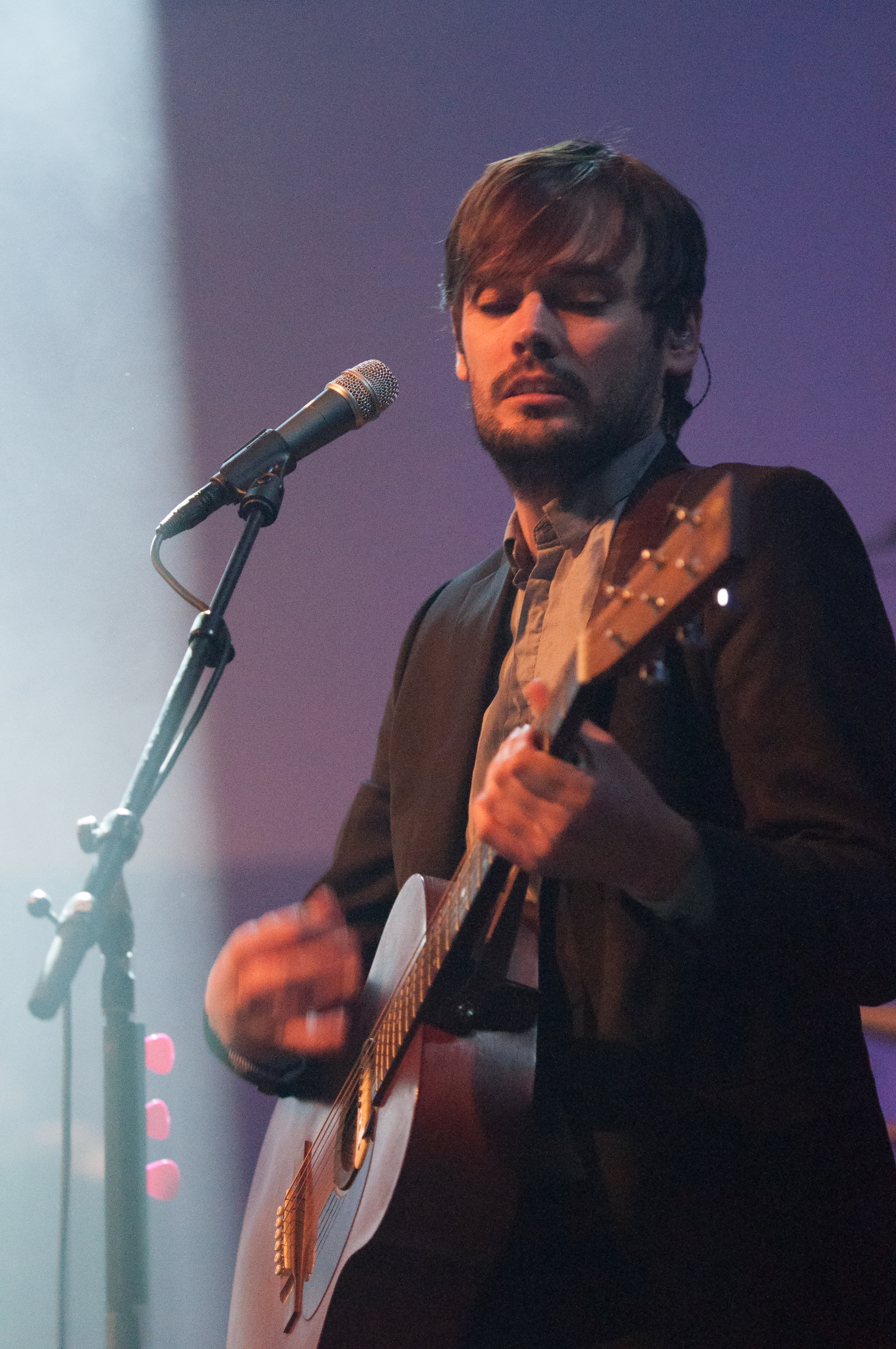
Matthew Irons (2018–2019)

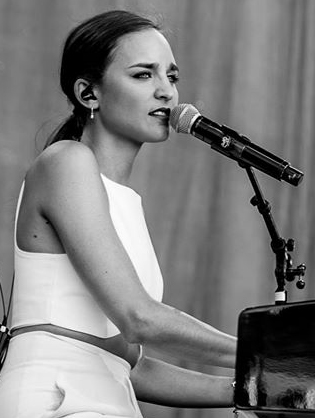
Typh Barrow (2019–2022)

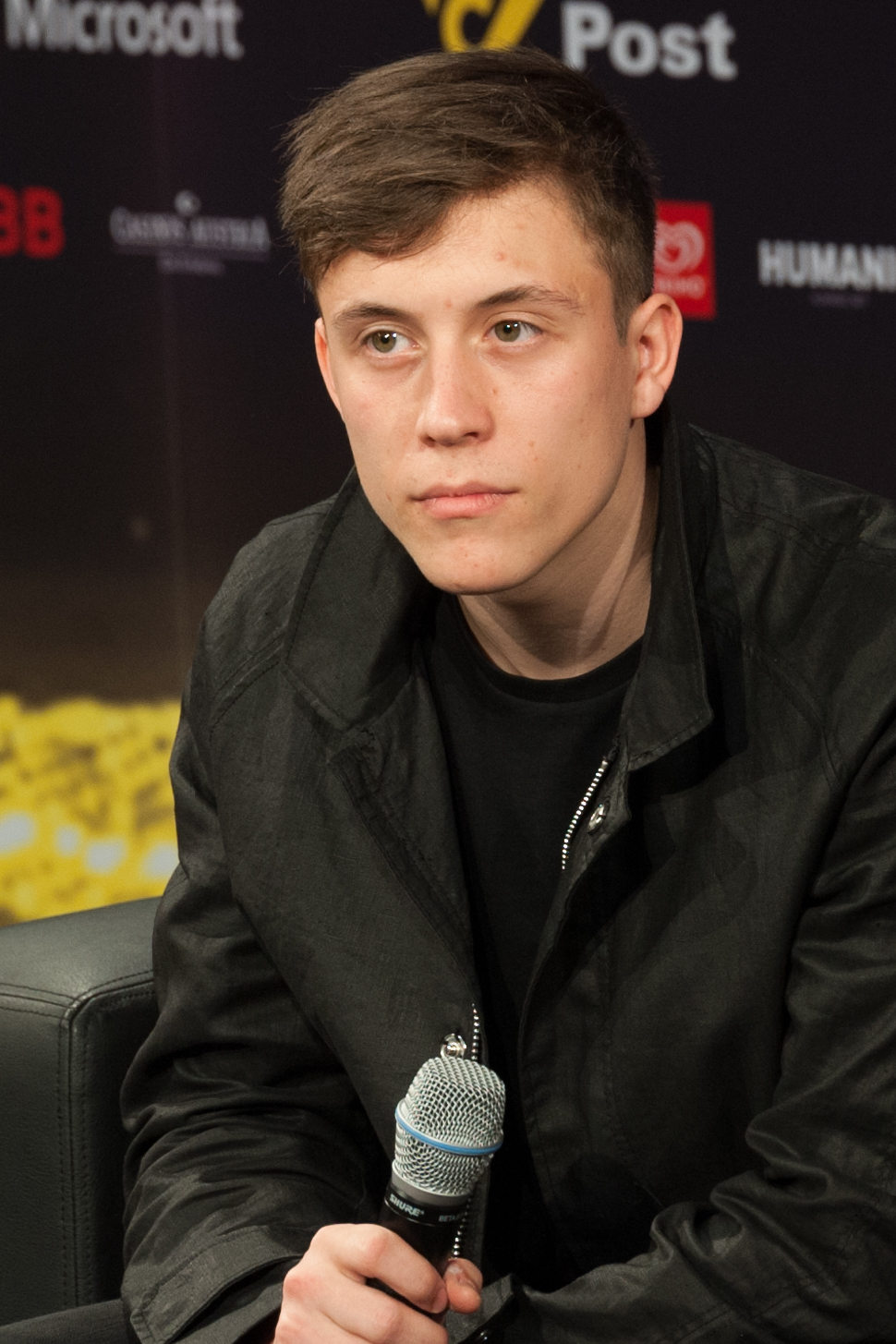
Loïc Nottet (2020–2021; 2026–)

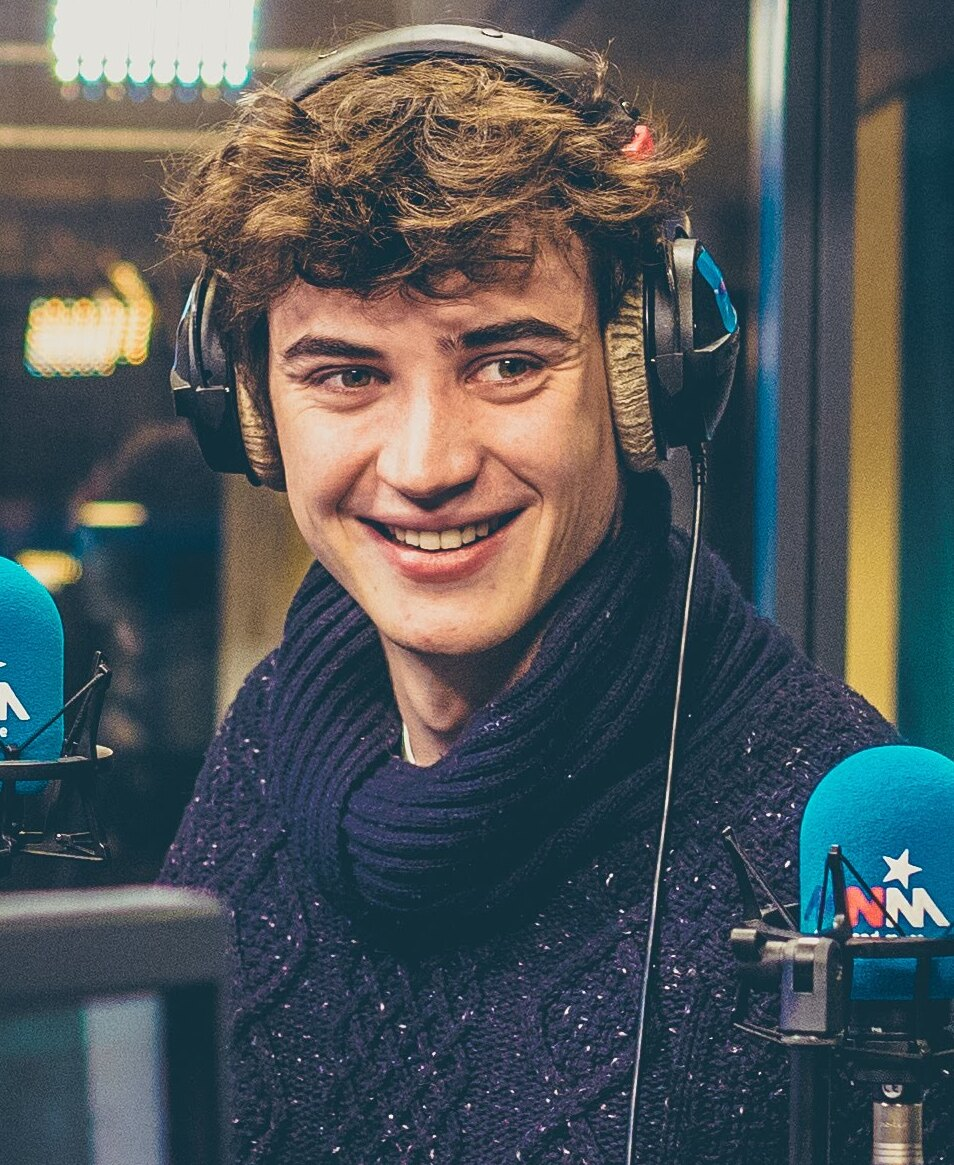
Henri PFR (2020–2021)

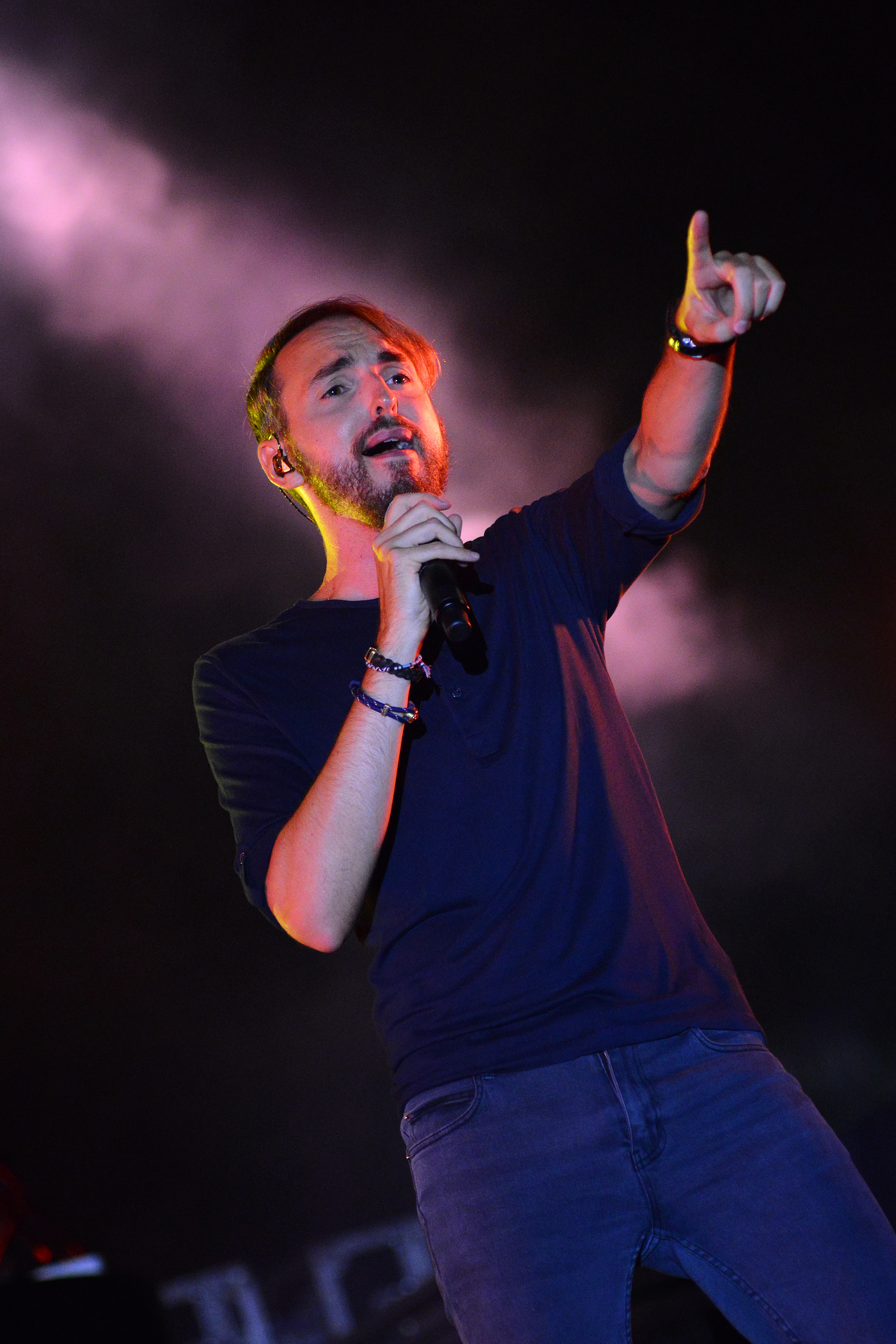
Christophe Willem (2021–)

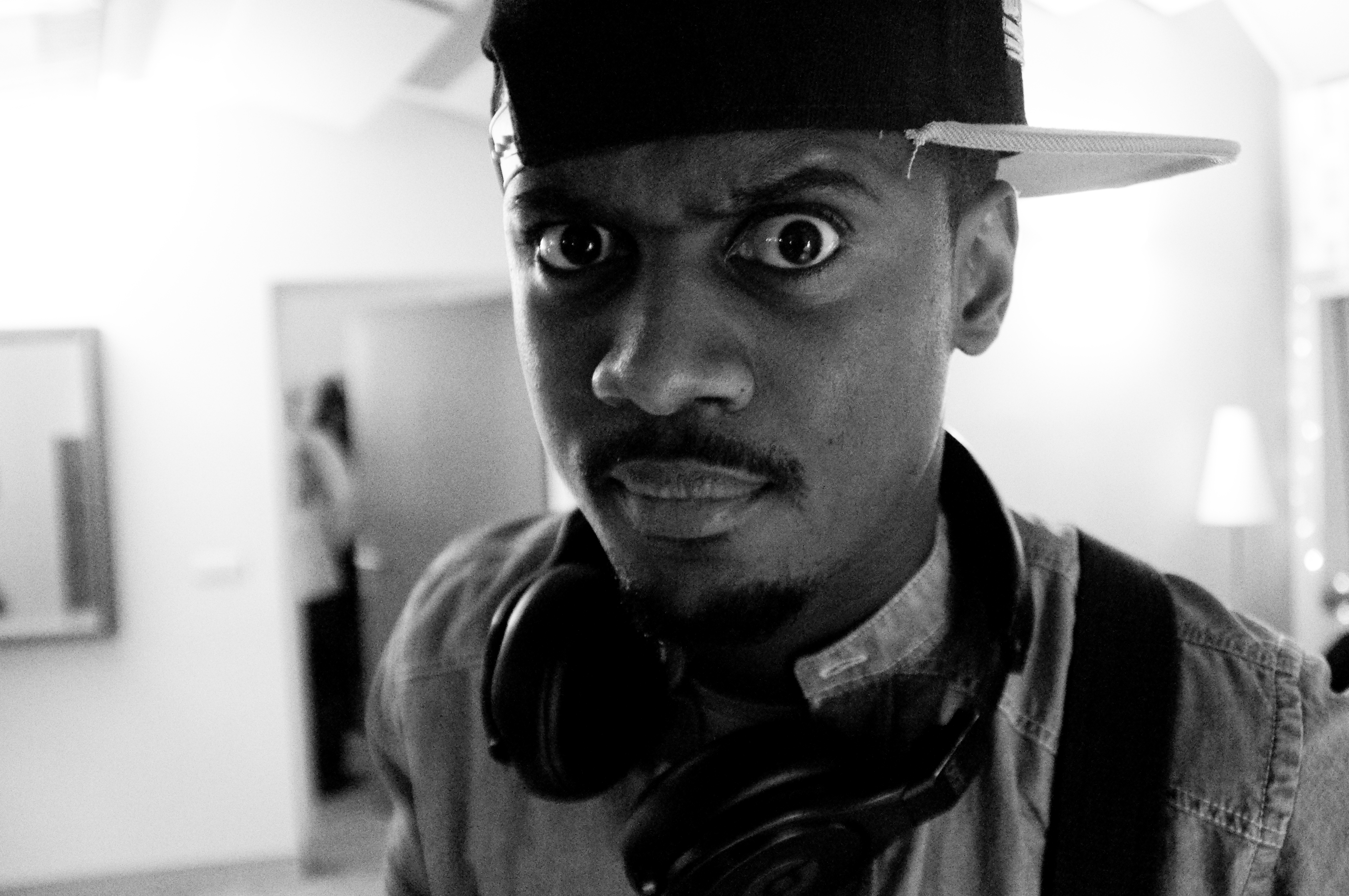
Black M (2021–2022)

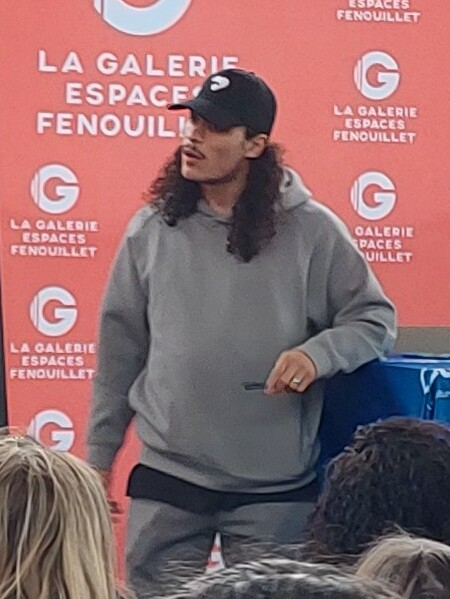
Hatik (2024)

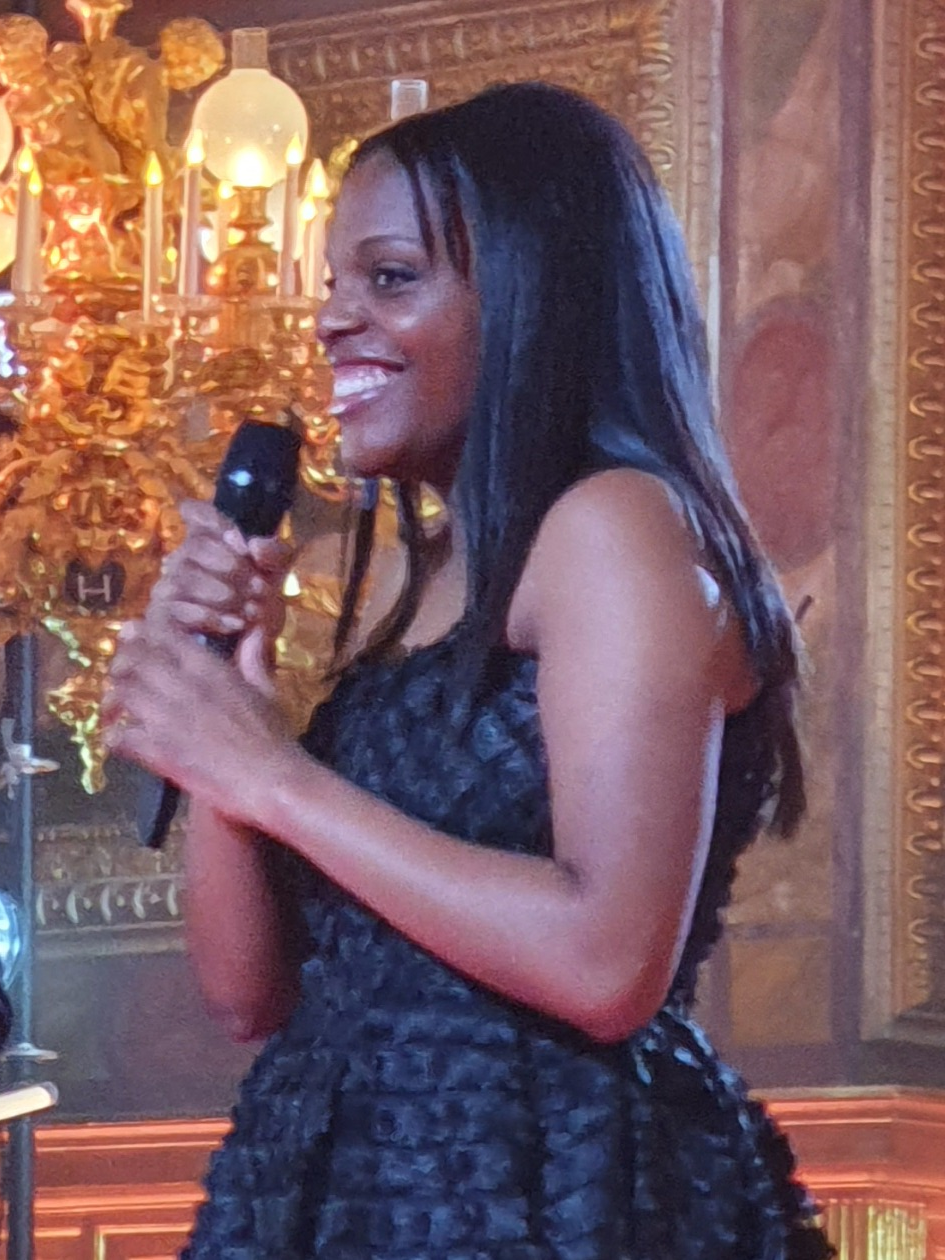
Mentissa Aziza (2024)

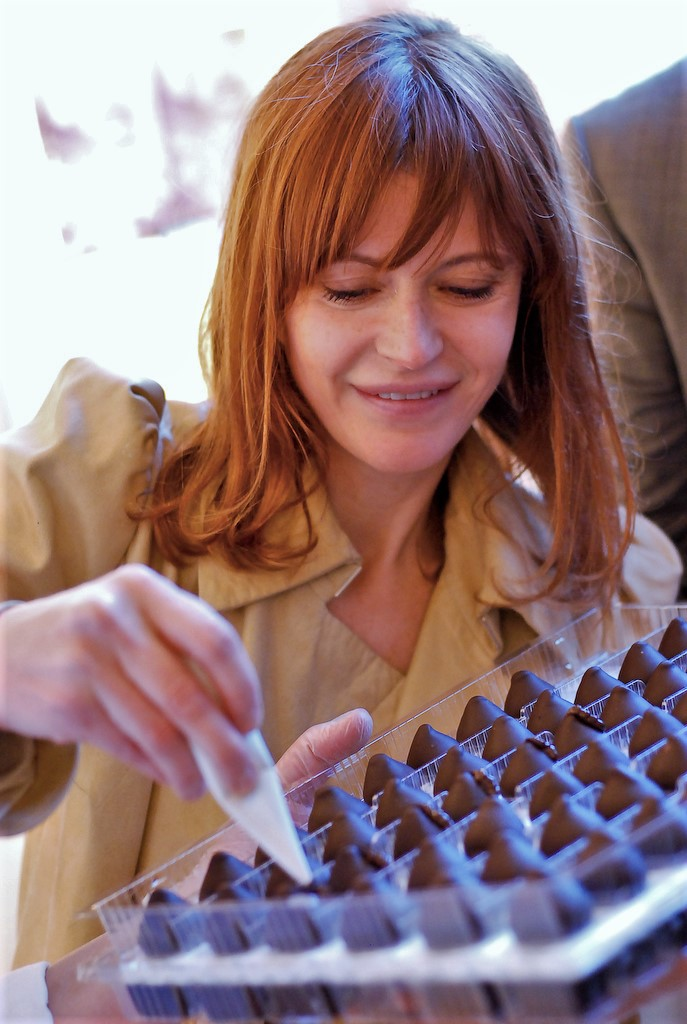
Axelle Red (2026–)

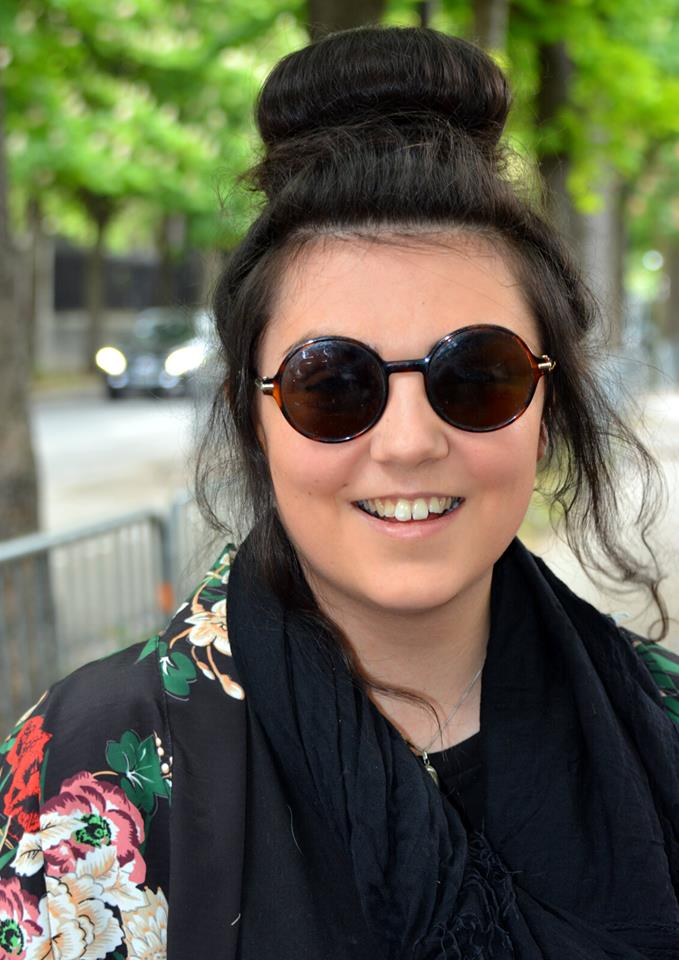
Hoshi (2026–)

=== Line-up of coaches ===
Coaches' line-up by chairs order
Season	Year	Coaches			
Season	Year	1	2	3	4
1	2011-12	Quentin	Lio	Joshua	BJ Scott
2	2013	Marc	BJ Scott	Quentin	Natasha
3	2014	Natasha	Marc	BJ Scott	Bastian
4	2015	Jali	Chimène	BJ Scott	Stanislas
5	2016	Stanislas	BJ Scott	Quentin	Cats on Trees
6	2017	Marc	Quentin	BJ Scott	Bigflo & Oli
7	2018	Matthew	BJ Scott	Slimane	Vitaa
8	2019	Matthew	Typh	Slimane	Vitaa
9	2020-21	Henri	BJ Scott	Typh	Loïc
10	2021-22	Christophe	BJ Scott	Black M	Typh
11	2024	Christophe	Mentissa	Hatik	BJ Scott
12	2026	Christophe	Hoshi	Loïc	Axelle

=== Timeline of coaches ===
Featured as a full-time coach
Featured as a guest coach

K	Coach	Season											
K	Coach	1	2	3	4	5	6	7	8	9	10	11	12
	Beverly Jo Scott												
	Quentin Mosimann												
	Joshua												
	Lio												
	Marc Pinilla												
	Natasha St-Pier												
	Bastian Baker												
	Stanislas												
	Jali												
	Chimène Badi												
	Cats on Trees												
	Bigflo & Oli												
	Matthew Irons												
	Vitaa												
	Slimane Nebchi												
	Typh Barrow												
	Loïc Nottet												
	Henri PFR												
	Christophe Willem												
	Black M												
	Mentissa Aziza												
	Hatik												
	Axelle Red												
	Hoshi												

=== Hosts ===
Maureen Louys was the original presenter of the show, with Adrien Devyver serving as the backstage host. In season 4, Devyver was replaced by Walid, who served as the backstage host from seasons 4 through 6 before being replaced by Cécile Djunga. Djunga left after one season, with seasons 8 and 9 having no backstage host. In season 10, Fanny Jandrain joined as the backstage host, leaving the following season and resulting in the show having no backstage host for the remainder of the series.

In season 12, Louys was replaced by Jérémie Baise after serving as presenter for 11 seasons.

=== Timeline of hosts ===
Featured as a full-time host
Featured as a backstage host

Host	Season											
Host	1	2	3	4	5	6	7	8	9	10	11	12
Maureen Louys												
Adrien Devyver												
Walid												
Cécile Djunga												
Fanny Jandrain												
Jérémie Baise												

== Coaches' teams ==
- Winning
- Runner-up
- Third place
- Fourth place
- These are each of the coaches' teams throughout the seasons' live shows. Winners are in **bold** and finalists in italic.

Season	Coaches and their finalists			
1	Quentin Mosimann	Lio	Joshua	Beverly Jo Scott
1	**Roberto Bellarosa**; Léonie Wasukulu; Juliane Chleide; Luc De Wacter; Charlotte Moors; Marco Celsi	Daisy Hermans; Simon Fosseprez; Caroline Bloukiaux; Kevin Cools; Meggy Niessen; Dunia Moreno	Giusy Piccarreta; Mathieu Duchêne; Lubiana Kepaou; Christian Aines; Michel Colyn; P-Jo	Renato Bennardo; Julie Compagnon; Megan Giart; Caroline Gonda; Stéphanie Hansen; Maïkel Chauveau
2	Quentin Mosimann	Natasha St-Pier	Marc Pinilla	Beverly Jo Scott
2	Michaël Meers; Laura Diliberto; Grazia Zambataro; Kate O'Sullivan; Mélissa Dubois; Véronique Capelle; Elena Marin Avila; Mounia Hamra	Robin Guérit; Manou Maerten; Antoine Innocent; Elia Fragione; Céline Boonen; Lisa Pezzuto; Tiziana Balsamo; Lou-Marine Vanden Abeelen	**David Madi**; Samuel Bosmans; Tatiana Didion; André Tajchman; Jennifer Hozay; Ambre de Pierpont; William Druet; Célia Manzo	Angy Sciacqua; Loredana Castiglia; Vanessa Marcoux; Alexandre Houart; Théo Pollet; Audrey Lallemand; Anne-Sophie Terschan; Maxime Votot
3	Bastian Baker	Natasha St-Pier	Marc Pinilla	Beverly Jo Scott
3	Julie Carpino; Thomas Vereecke; Raphaël Rozenfeld; Adeline Vanden Abeele; Renata Skunczyk; Laura Saint Georges; Aurélie Boffé; Angelo Milioto	**Laurent Pagna**; Alice Dutoit; Manuel Marchetti; Jean-Michel Kraus; Tessa Dixson; Noémie Renuart; Eva Gonçalves; Sahra Ben Kacem	Boris Motte; Philip Pliskin; Lindsay Ordonez; Maxime Seclin; Tanaïssa Beer; Laura Dikovec; Cédric Toussaint; Karolina Kulicka	Loïc Nottet; Maxime Malevé; Suzy Magnien; Kayla Galland; Aline Stecker; Raphaël Galante; Manon Hardy; Lionel Blum
4	Jali	Chimène Badi	Stanislas	Beverly Jo Scott
4	Thomas Damoiseaux; Barbara Hermans; Mathilde Hoslet; Marie Gaziaux; Kévin Van Eesbeek; Khalil Abtal; Miriana Buscemi; Justine Fizaine	**Florent Brack**; Joke Leloux; Antoine Decocq; Jessy Douaire; Aurélie Boniver; Ambre Conté; Maïté Monard; Michaël Donato	Tatiana Trenogina; Amélie Willame; Clément Vancraeynest; Nathalie Darimont; Juliette Van Vyve; Coralie Derongé; David Cage; Mike Kadima	Carmen Araujo Santamaria; Samuel De Noos; Céline Strappazon; Aurore Kiritchouk; Dounia Jnioui; Lawra Marzano; Jana Jordens; Félicia Mukendi
5	Quentin Mosimann	Cats on Trees	Stanislas	Beverly Jo Scott
5	Olivier Kaye; Davide Manna; Prescillia Forthomme; Marie Henrot; Andy Demaiffe; Lyssia Demeulenaere; Stéphanie Carvalho; Sarah Boudou	Christophe Wurm; Pierre Lizée; Ellie Delvaux; Maéva Fiston; Virginie Cuffolo; Laura Dos Santos; Célestine Bastens; Bruno Zorzetto	Emma de Quick; Fanny Foguenne; Brigitte Thibaut; Julien Feller; Tiffany Jakab; Belinda Iberhysaj; Séva Dothée; Alexandre Diliberto	**Laura Cartesiani**; Inès Bailly; Gil Teixeira; Aline Oger; Hervé Cornerotte; Jonathan Viroux; Louise Parisis; Arnaud Sioen
6	Quentin Mosimann	Bigflo & Oli	Marc Pinilla	Beverly Jo Scott
6	**Théophile Rénier**; François Gennart; Carla Katz; Milla Vitali; Daniel Muzembe; Perrine Prieur; Angélie Lisman; Margaux Coene	Oriane Simon et Pierre de Neuville; Marie Lenoir; Eloïse Delfosse; Lazaros Papadopoulos; Tom Joway; Malamaténia Renard; Vanessa Issa; Fei-Lin Benoit	Julien Michel; Céleste Corneliau; Valentine Collinet; Marine Delmotte; Bruno Di Carlo; Vienna Pezzuto; Collin de Bruyne; Leutrim Aliaj	Tyana Plewacki; Livio Hans; Laura Curado; Joséphine Le Grelle; Emilio Amico; Eva Marx; Tamara Legrand; Pistice Yoka Mpela
7	Matthew Irons	Slimane Nebchi	Vitaa	Beverly Jo Scott
7	**Valentine Brognion**; Estelle Pepinster; Marie-Cécile de Lhoneux; Lola Lippert; Yasha Deleeuw; Sara Kobi; Nejla Belhaj; David-Adrian Porzio Mortera	Soraya Slimani; Adrien Binon; Andreia Rio; Samuel Nagy; Marylène Corro; Maëla Warlet; Luca Turco; Eliot Vassamilet	Stéphanie Euphoria; Camille Schneyders; Sarah Zekhnini; Lejla Burazerovic; Anaïs Cambus; Paak Kormongkolkul; Mona Miozesky; Jonathan Thambwe	Jeff Danes; Deborah Brull; Léa Pochet; Fabiola Legrain; Philippe Lombert; Woody Wittock; Pierre Edel; Selim Boudraa
8	Matthew Irons	Slimane Nebchi	Vitaa	Typh Barrow
8	**Charlotte Foret**; Ola Polet; Pavel Guershovitch; Samir Ziatt; Luna van Den Hauwe; Youry Tilman; Amanda Gielen; Muriel D'Ailleurs	Guillaume Vermeire; Emanuel Ibraim; Sophie de Pireux; Juliette Moisan; Alice Spapen; Arthur Meunier; Zainab Gahmrane; Maëlle Lepeut	Nicholas Brynin; Hilario Dos Santos; Jo-Ann Teope; Naïm Lallali; Camille Poupet; Emeline Tout Court; Max Montagne; Baptiste Guidicelli	Matteo Terzi; Iris Hemazro; Cloé Zimmer; Thomas Alfra; Jérémy Charron; Jean-Christian Muneza; Byllel Benyahia; Romane Collin
9	Henri PFR	Loïc Nottet	Beverly Jo Scott	Typh Barrow
9	Sonita Ojong; Lou Boland; TK Russel; Hasmik Shirinyan; Jennifer Malengela; Dania Bartoloméo; Quentin Henri; Barbara Candolini; Mamadou "Douma" Ba	Orlane Willems; Joséphine Ugeux Remy; Mathias de Vleeschouwer; Thomas Lieben; Tissène Badi; Macha Azarkadon; Maira "Belassa" Belkouaci; Bradley Kasongo	**Jérémie Makiese**; Elsa Puslecki; Mateo Rodriguez; Sevan Richard; Vik Autier; Clara Moffroid; Khadija Faber; Ziza Youssouf	Alice Van Eesbeeck; Edith Pirard; Jonas Gomes; Jérémy Delaunoy; Bryan Limbourg; Mathilde Goedermans; Laysa Chennit
10	Christophe Willem	Black M	Beverly Jo Scott	Typh Barrow
10	Maysha Capoul; Rosalie Vancauwenberghe; Arthmony; Enola Elearts; Manal Ermichi; Maréva Poaty; Iris Fournier	Sekina Bensiali; Valentin Sortino; Anae Bida; Roxane Taquet; Levandé; Saphyra Malulu Buanda	**Alec Golard**; Raphaël Rufo; Nora Volon; Adriana de Chavagnac; Chloé Lopes Valadao; Christopher Mingiedi	Valentine Martens; Diana Kovalova; Zélia Ponthieu; Mounir Abouroh; Oan Warnon; Daniel Vincke
11	Christophe Willem	Hatik	Beverly Jo Scott	Mentissa Aziza
11	Clément Corillon; Selena Gasore; Maxime Ukwishaka; Nikie Vinck; Marika Mantia; Sandy Bakomi; Maestrina; Jacques Lemière	Alyah Lukunku; Bart Kobain; Naomi Amore; Tamera Petaroscia; Tom Correia de Oliveira; Eléa Choustoulakis; Cécilia Quiroga Garcia; Veton	**Emma Sorgato**; Tiziano Greco; Miya El Hadi; Shelby Ouattara; Çiğdem Yönder; Diogo De Almeida Fonseca; Princesse Taptchou Simo; Florence Colacino	Alexandre Houard; Louisa Gerard; Jasper Publie; Victoria Lechanteur; Zoé Arnould Siroul; Marie Alexandre; Herisoa Randriatsizafy; Valentin Vertessen
12	Christophe Willem	Hoshi	Loïc Nottet	Axelle Red
12	Rizlane Bakali; Sébastien Nicolaï; Thibault Charlot; Raylson Silva Diniz; Charlotte Remwa	Pepe; Théo Rasquin; Django Van Aerschot; Antoine Buyl; Moke Ame Mowatt	**Clément Chevalier**; Laura Rwanyagasore; Evan Brichart; Manon Amand; Ana Romano	Emeka; Apolline Bosschem; Gloomy; Chloé Pappalardo; Thalles Lopes Santana de Almeida

== Series overview ==
Teams colour key
Artist from Team BJ	Artist from Team Jali	Artist from Team Loïc
Artist from Team Quentin	Artist from Team Chimène	Artist from Team Henri
Artist from Team Joshua	Artist from Team Cats on Trees	Artist from Team Christophe
Artist from Team Lio	Artist from Team Bigflo & Oli	Artist from Team Black M
Artist from Team Marc	Artist from Team Matthew	Artist from Team Mentissa
Artist from Team Natasha	Artist from Team Vitaa	Artist from Team Hatik
Artist from Team Bastian	Artist from Team Slimane	Artist from Team Axelle
Artist from Team Stanislas	Artist from Team Typh	Artist from Team Hoshi

The Voice Belgique series overview
Season	Aired in	Winner	Runner-up	Third place	Fourth place	Winning coach	Host(s)	
Season	Aired in	Winner	Runner-up	Third place	Fourth place	Winning coach	Main	Backstage
1	2011–12	Roberto Bellarosa	Renato Bennardo	Daisy Hermans	Giusy Piccarreta	Quentin Mosimann	Maureen Louys	Adrien Devyver
2	2013	David Madi	Robin Guérit	Angy Sciacqua	Michaël Meers	Marc Pinilla	Maureen Louys	Adrien Devyver
3	2014	Laurent Pagna	Loïc Nottet	Julie Carpino	Boris Motte	Natasha St-Pier	Maureen Louys	Adrien Devyver
4	2015	Florent Brack	Carmen Santamaria	Thomas Damoiseaux	Tatiana Trenogina	Chimène Badi	Maureen Louys	Walid
5	2016	Laura Cartesiani	Emma de Quick	Olivier Kaye	Christophe Wurm	Beverly Jo Scott	Maureen Louys	Walid
6	2017	Théophile Rénier	Tyana Plewacki	Julien Michel	Oriane & Pierre	Quentin Mosimann	Maureen Louys	Walid
7	2018	Valentine Brognion	Jeff Danes	Stéphanie Euphoria	Soraya Slimani	Matthew Irons	Maureen Louys	Cécile Djunga
8	2019	Charlotte Foret	Matteo Terzi	Guillaume Vermeire	Nicholas Brynin	Matthew Irons	Maureen Louys	—N/a
9	2020–21	Jérémie Makiese	Alice Van Eesbeeck	Sonita Ojong	Orlane Willems	Beverly Jo Scott	Maureen Louys	—N/a
10	2021–22	Alec Golard	Valentine Martens	Maysha Capoul	Sekina Bensiali	Beverly Jo Scott	Maureen Louys	Fanny Jandrain
11	2024	Emma Sorgato	Alyah Lukunku	Clément Corillon	Alexandre Houard	Beverly Jo Scott	Maureen Louys	—N/a
12	2026	Clément Chevalier	Emeka	Rizlane Bakali	Pepe	Loïc Nottet	Jérémie Baise	—N/a

== The Voice Kids Belgique ==
The Voice Belgique
- Created by: John de Mol Jr. Roel van Velzen
- Presented by: Current; Fanny Jandrain (3–); Robin Soysa (backstage; 3-); Former; Maureen Louys (1–2); Prezy (backstage; 1); Luana Fontana (backstage; 2)
- Judges: Current; Alice on the Roof (2–); Joseph Kamel (3–); Mentissa (4–); Lorie (4–); Former; Slimane Nebchi (1); Vitaa (1); Black M (2); Matthew Irons (1–3); Typh Barrow (2–3)
- Country of origin: Belgium
- Original language: French
- No. of seasons: 3

Production
- Producer: Talpa Media Group
- Production company: ITV Studios

Original release
- Network: La Une & VivaCité
- Release: 7 January 2020 – present

In July 2019, RTBF announced that they would produce their own version of The Voice Kids. Like the Flemish version, the Wallonian version requires participants to be between the ages of 8 and 14. The first season premiered on 7 January 2020. Océana Siciliano, coached by Slimane, won the first season. The second season premiered on 19 September 2023. Elena Kabongo, coached by Black M, won the second season. The third season premiered on 14 October 2025. Ilena Vigna, coached by Typh Barrow, won the third season.

=== Coaches ===
The coaches for the first season were announced to be Slimane Nebchi, Vitaa and Matthew Irons from the band Puggy. On 22 May 2022, it was announced that there would be 4 coaches instead of 3 in the judging panel for the second season, with only Irons returning while Black M and Alice on the Roof would join the show as new coaches, replacing Nebchi and Vitaa. Typh Barrow joined the show as a fourth coach and the third new coach, thus completing the panel. On 11 October 2024, it was announced that a third season will air. On 25 November 2024, it was announced that Black M would leave the show, while Irons, Alice on the Roof and Barrow would all return as coaches. They are joined by debuting coach Joseph Kamel. On 24 June 2026, it was announced that Irons and Barrow would leave the show. At the same time, Alice on the Roof and Kamel were announced to return for the fourth season, while former The Voice Belgique coach Mentissa Aziza and Lorie would debut as coaches.

Coaches gallery

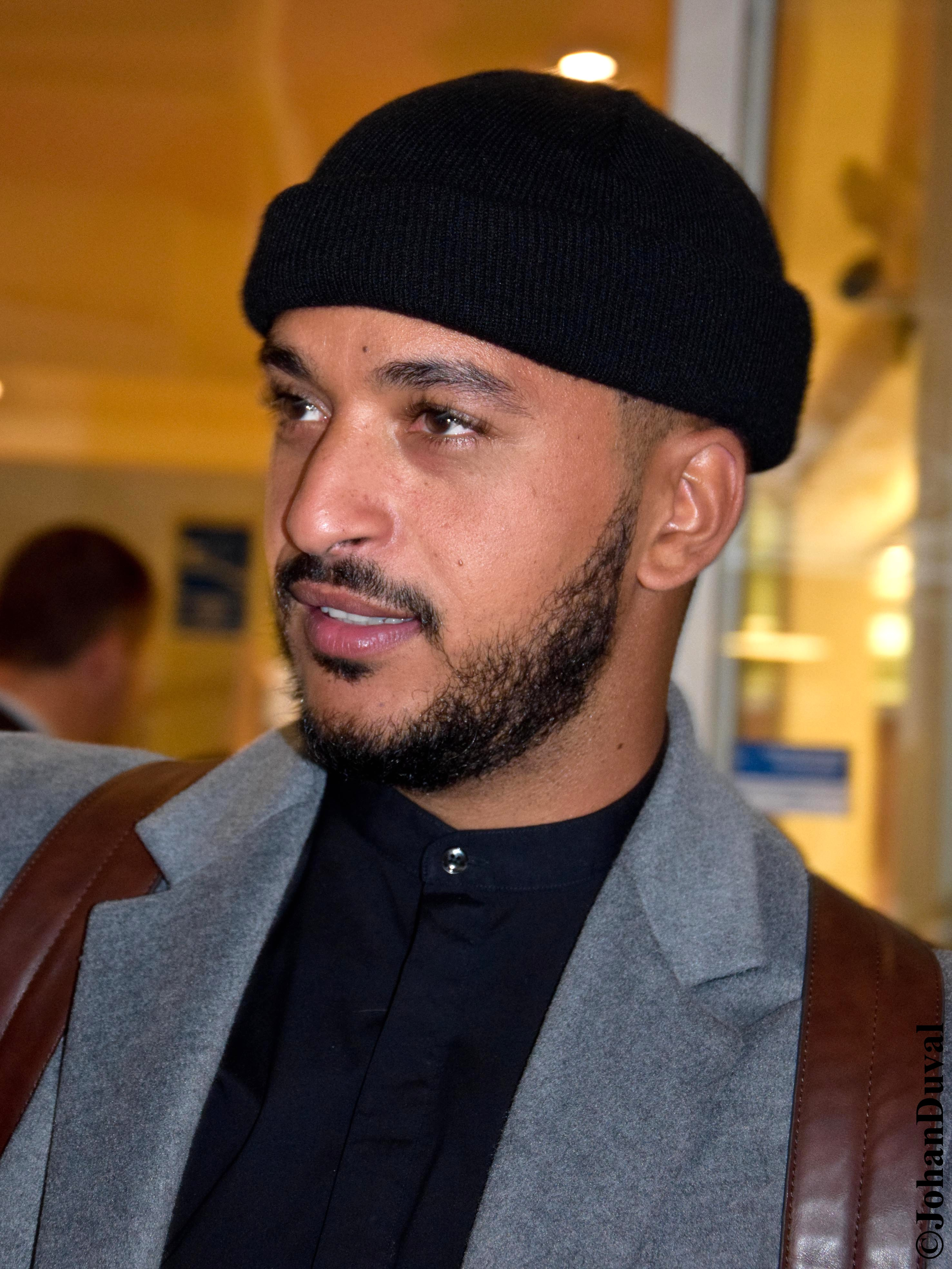
Slimane Nebchi (1)

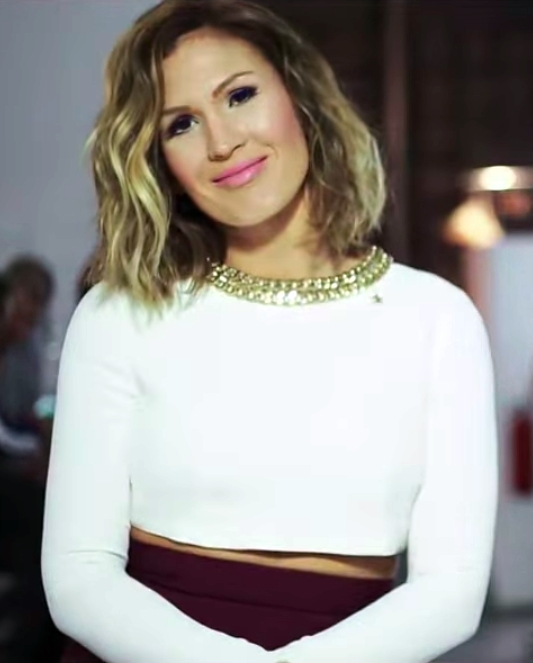
Vitaa (1)

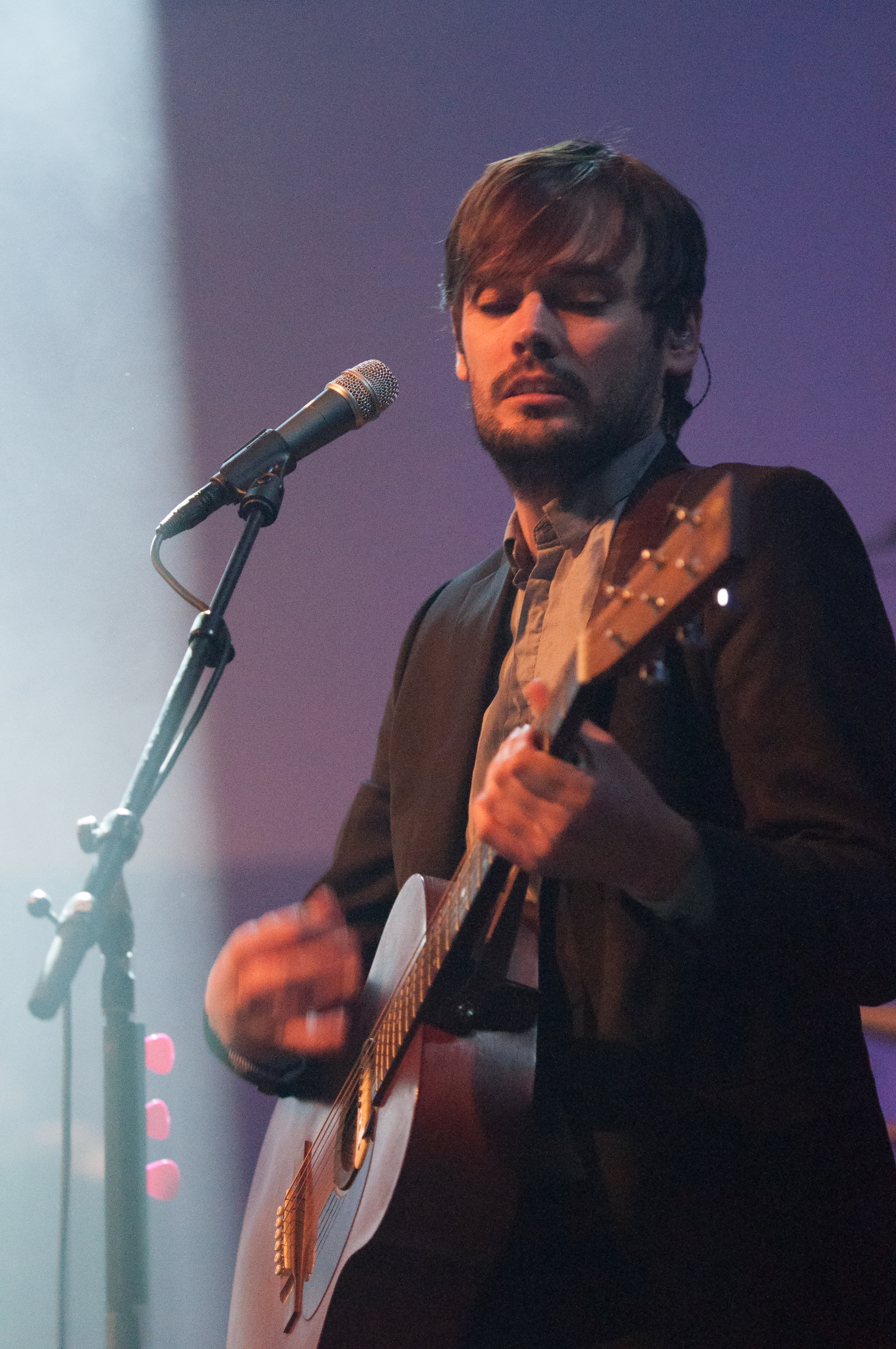
Matthew Irons (1–3)

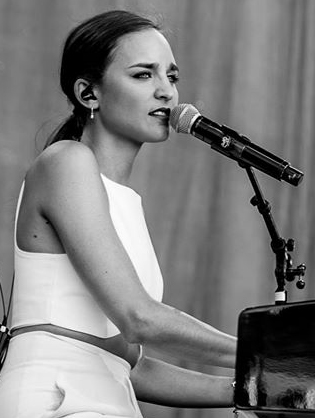
Typh Barrow (2–3)

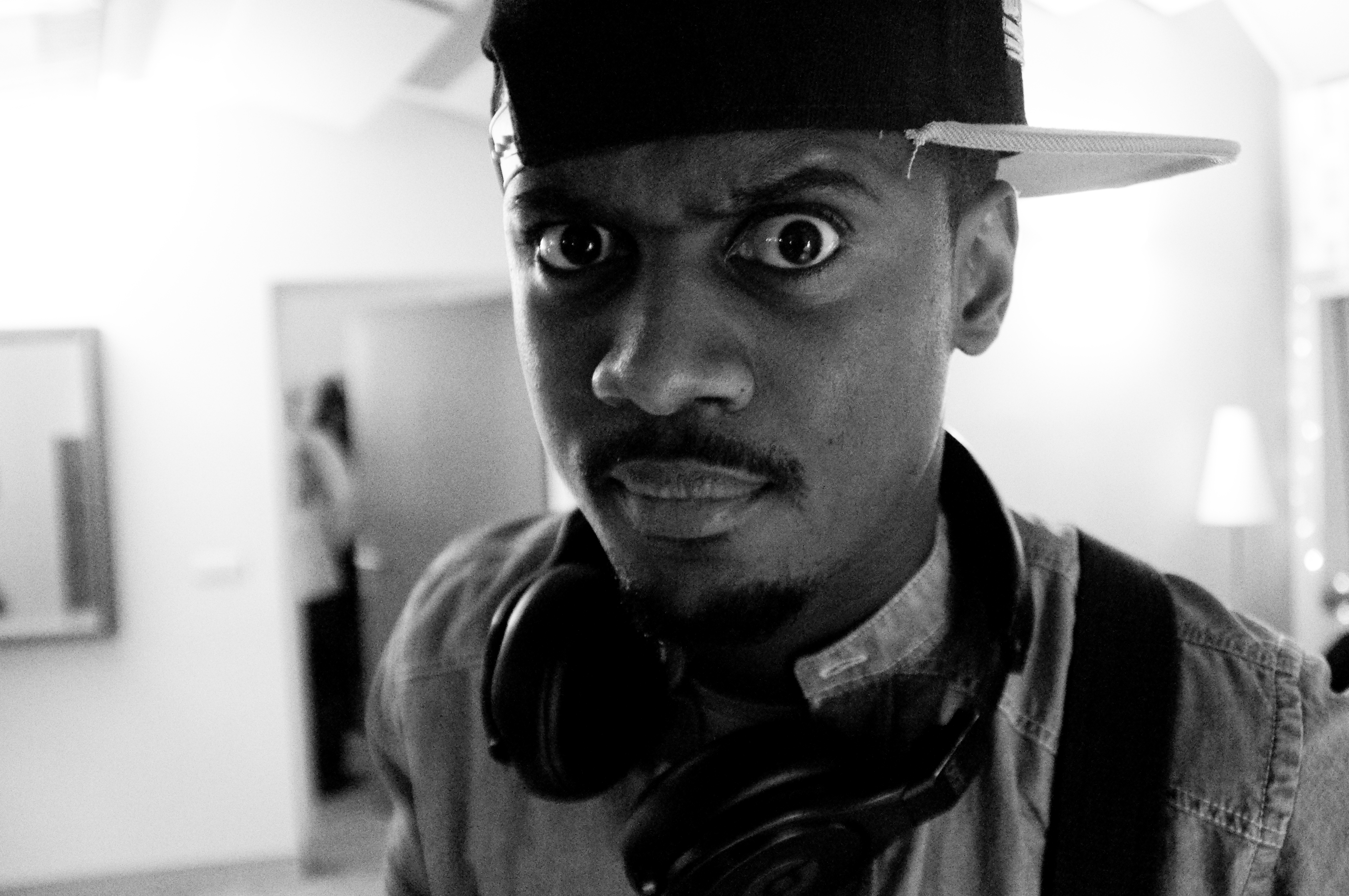
Black M (2)

Alice on the Roof (2–)

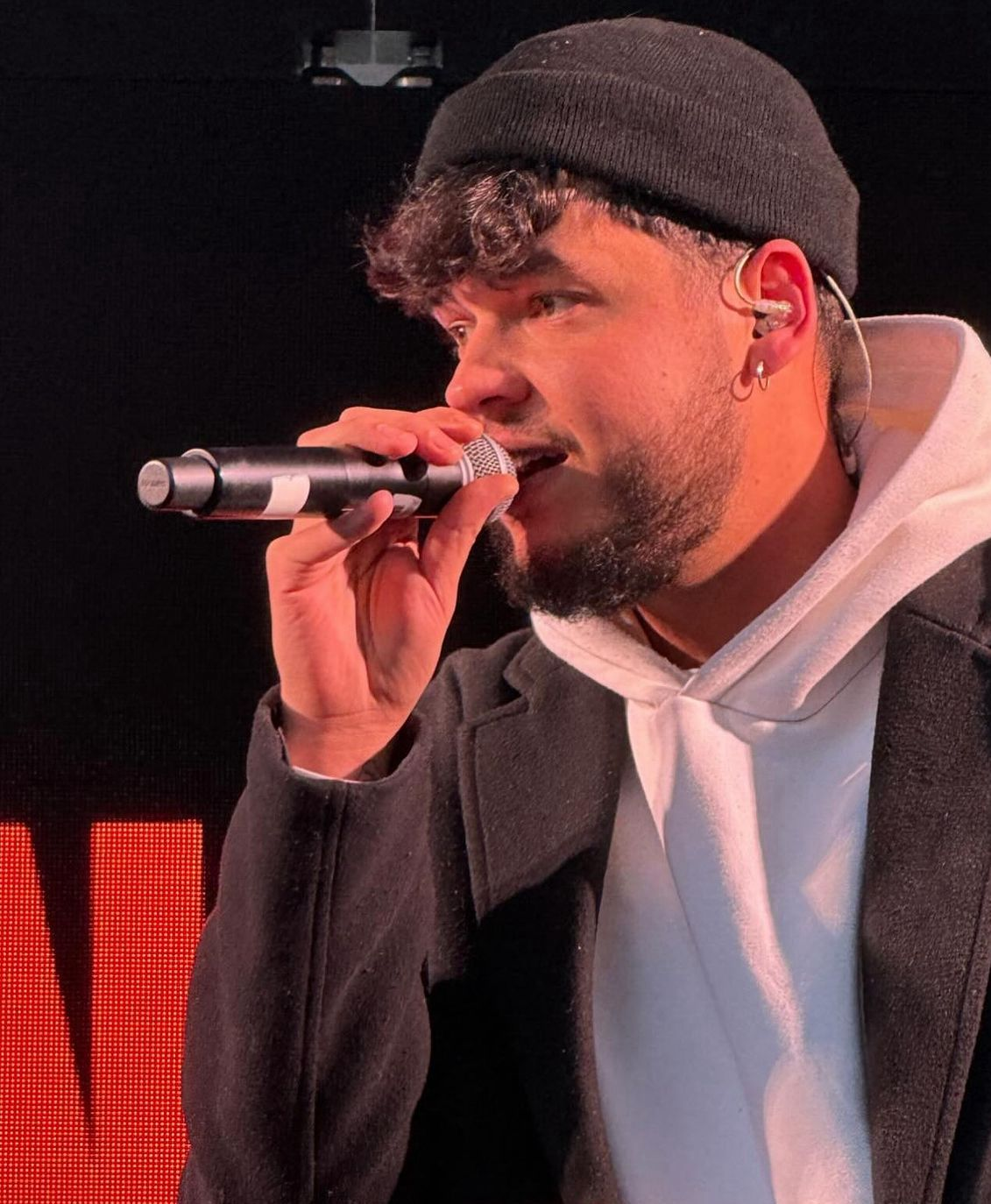
Joseph Kamel (3–)

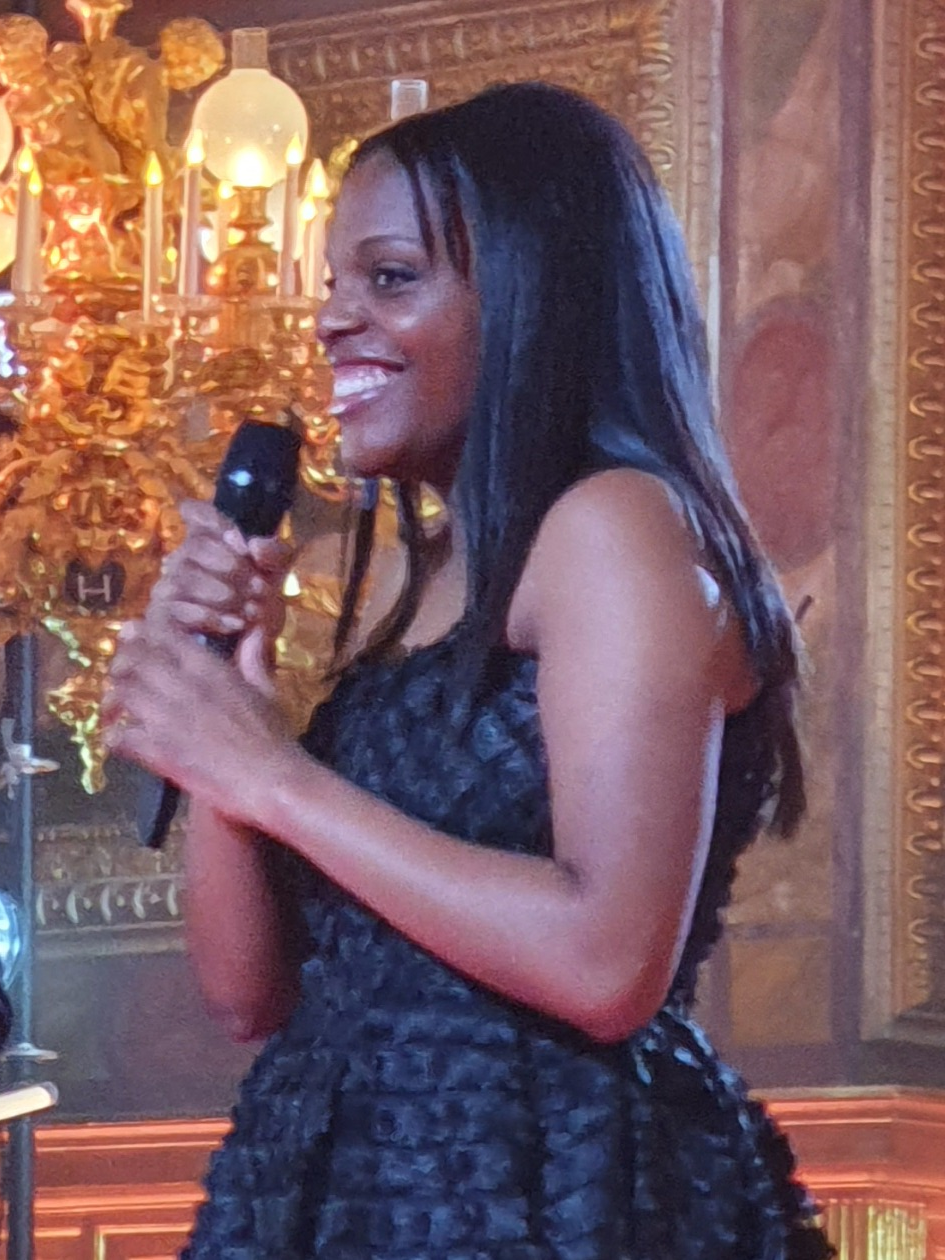
Mentissa Aziza (4–)

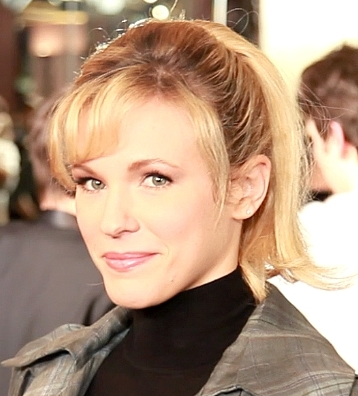
Lorie (4–)

=== Coaches' timeline ===
Coaches	Seasons			
Coaches	1	2	3	4
Matthew Irons				
Slimane				
Vitaa				
Alice on the Roof				
Typh Barrow				
Black M				
Joseph Kamel				
Mentissa Aziza				
Lorie				

=== Line-up of coaches ===
Coaches' line-up by chairs order
Season	Year	Coaches			
Season	Year	1	2	3	4
1	2020	Matthew	Vitaa	Slimane	—N/a
2	2023	Matthew	Alice	Black M	Typh
3	2025	Matthew	Alice	Typh	Joseph
4	2026	Joseph	Lorie	Alice	Mentissa

=== Coaches' teams ===
- Winning
- Runner-up
- Third Place
- Fourth Place

Season	Coaches and their finalists			
1	Matthew Irons	Vitaa	Slimane	
1	Anouk Klein; Sadia	Mathis; Lina	Océana Siciliano; Chiara	
2	Matthew Irons	Alice on the Roof	Black M	Typh Barrow
2	Lucie Mazzu; Mahdi; Larissa; Nina	Tiliano; Malou; Yanis; Nala	Elena Kabongo; Martina; Apolline; Hanaë	Mattia Sciascia; Elsa; Viktoria; Lola
3	Matthew Irons	Alice on the Roof	Typh Barrow	Joseph Kamel
3	Marion Duplicy; Nina; Camilia; Romane	Roméo; Victoire; Leslie; Lou	Ilena Vigna; Alba; Ismaël; Ornella	Mealyah; Zoé Blavier; Camille; Norah
4	Mentissa Aziza	Alice on the Roof	Joseph Kamel	Lorie
4	Upcoming season			

=== Series overview ===
Teams colour key
Artist from Team Matthew	Artist from Team Alice	Artist from Team Joseph
Artist from Team Slimane	Artist from Team Typh
Artist from Team Vitaa	Artist from Team Black M

The Voice Kids Belgique series overview
Season	Aired	Winner	Runner-up	Third Place	Fourth Place	Winning coach	Presenters	
Season	Aired	Winner	Runner-up	Third Place	Fourth Place	Winning coach	Main	Backstage
1	2020	Océana Siciliano	Anouk Klein	Mathis	—N/a	Slimane Nebchi	Maureen Louys	Prezy
2	2023	Elena Kabongo	Lucie Mazzu	Tiliano	Mattia Sciascia	Black M	Maureen Louys	Luana Fontana
3	2025	Ilena Vigna	Roméo	Mealyah	Marion Duplicy	Typh Barrow	Fanny Jandrain	Robin Soysa

== See also ==
- The Voice (franchise)
