= Joseph Kamel =

French-Egyptian singer

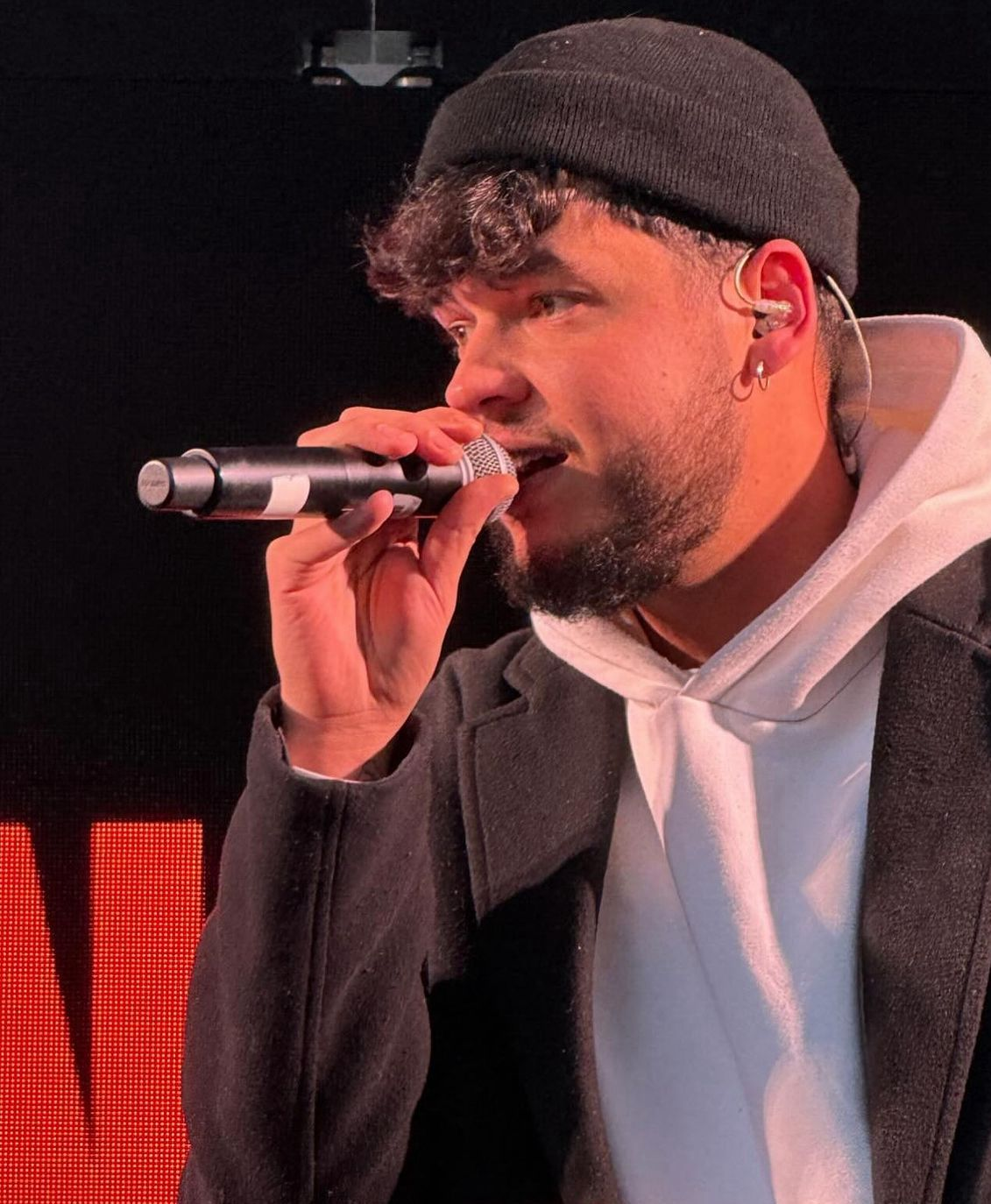
- Kamel in concert at Lyon, France, November 2023

Background information
- Born: 1 June 1996 (age 30); Cairo, Egypt
- Genres: Electro; folk; urban
- Occupations: Singer; songwriter
- Instruments: Vocals
- Years active: 2021–present
- Website: josephkamel.com

Joseph Kamel (born 1 June 1996), is an Egyptian singer who moved to France when he was thirteen. After the release of his self-titled debut EP he found success. His single "Beau", featuring Julien Doré, has over 10 million YouTube views since its release in 2023.

== Early life and travels ==
Kamel was born on 1 June 1996 in Cairo, Egypt. His mother was a doctor doing humanitarian work and his father was an international consultant. Joseph took an interest in music, often inspired by Egyptian culture and moved to France when he was thirteen. Shortly afterwards he began writing songs and playing guitar. While living in France, the genre of music Joseph Kamel performed was heavily inspired by music rooted in nouvelle scène française.

== Career ==
=== 2021–present: Debut and The Voice Kids Belgique ===
Kamel found substantial recognition in 2021 after the release of his eponymous debut EP which features five singles. His second EP, Rendez-vous was released in 2022. He released his debut album, Miroirs, on 27 October 2023. The album features guest appearances from fellow musicians Julien Doré and Mentissa.

In 2024, he began a tour around France, performing numerous singles from his discography.

Since 2025, Kamel has been a coach on The Voice Kids Belgique alongside Matthew Irons, Alice on the Roof, and Typh Barrow.

== Discography ==
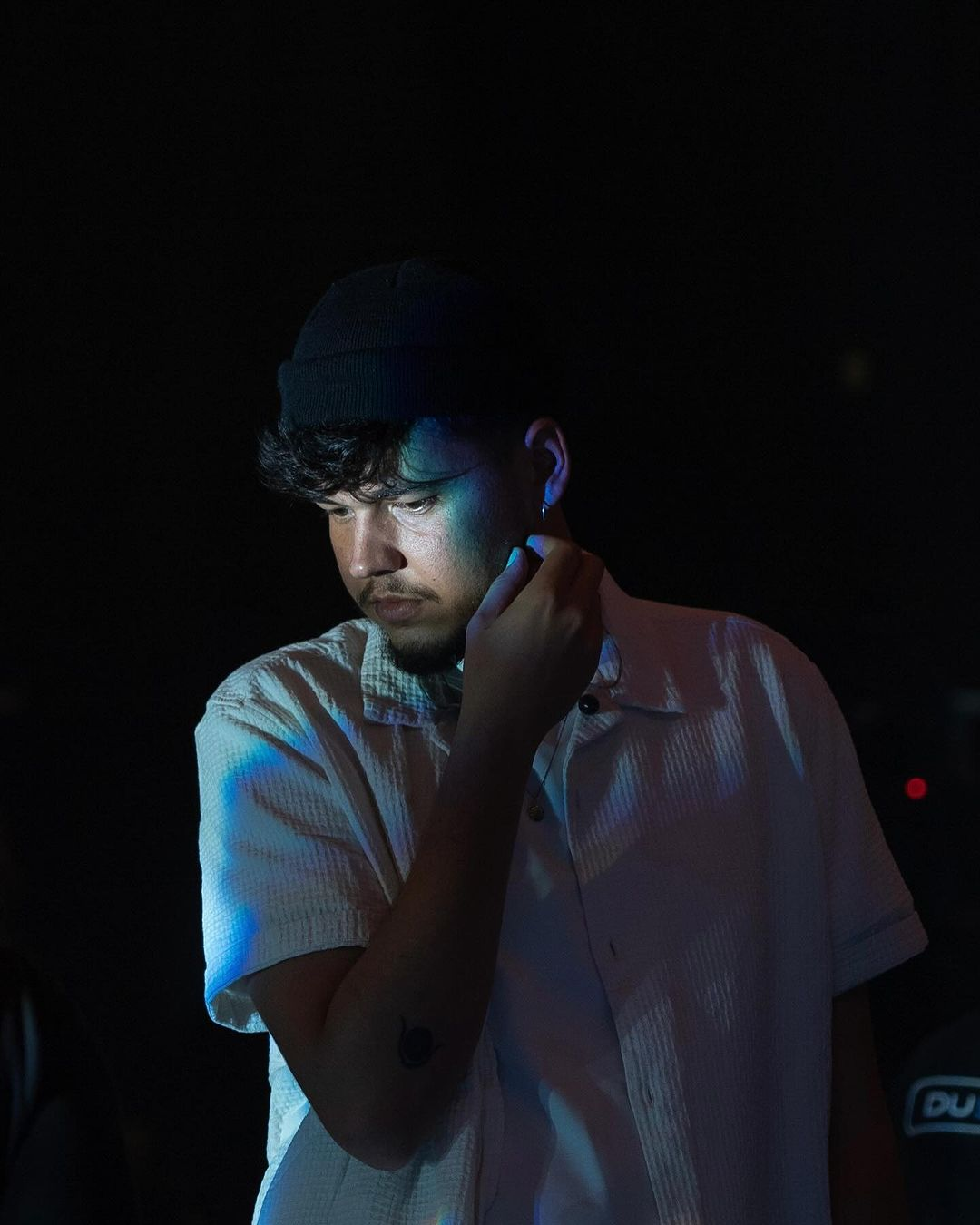
Kamel in September 2023

=== Albums ===
List of albums, with selected details, and chart positions
| Title | Details | Peaks |
| Title | Details | FRA |
|---|---|---|
| Miroirs | Released: 27 October 2023 | — |

=== Extended plays ===
List of extended plays, with selected details, and chart positions
| Title | Details | Peaks |
| Title | Details | FRA |
|---|---|---|
| Joseph Kamel | Released: 24 September 2021 | — |
| Rendez-vous | Released: 3 June 2022 | — |

=== Singles ===
List of singles, showing year released, and the name of the album/extended play
| Title | Year | Album/extended play |
|---|---|---|
| "Dis-moi" | 2021 | Joseph Kamel |
| "Pardon" | 2021 | Joseph Kamel |
| "Café" | 2021 | Joseph Kamel |
| "Le temps" | 2021 | Joseph Kamel |
| "Ne reste pas là" | 2021 | Joseph Kamel |
| "Premier Rendez-Vous" | 2022 | Rendez-vou |
| "Vieux" | 2022 | Rendez-vou |
| "Et Alors" | 2022 | Rendez-vou |
| "Caire" | 2022 | Rendez-vou |
| "Celui qui part" | 2023 | Miroirs |
| "Ados" | 2023 | Miroirs |
| "Beau" (featuring Julien Doré) | 2023 | Miroirs |
| "Tes Questions" | 2023 | Miroirs |
| "Impossible" | 2023 | Miroirs |
| "Miroir" | 2023 | Miroirs |
| "Maintenant" | 2023 | Miroirs |
| "Tu vis" (featuring Mentissa) | 2023 | Miroirs |
| "Ton regard" | 2024 | Miroirs (Edition deluxe) |
| "Petit Frère" | 2024 | Miroirs (Edition deluxe) |
