= Suarez (band) =

Belgian rock pop band

- Origin: Mons, Belgium
- Genre: Pop
- Years active: 2008-present
- Label: PIAS/30 février
- Members: Marc Pinilla; Max "Njava" Randriamanjava; Pata "Njava" Randriamanjava; Dada Ravalison; David Donnat (since 2011)
- Website: www.tadros.com

Suarez is a Belgian rock pop band with Marc Pinilla on lead vocals and the musician brothers Max et Pata Njava and their cousin Dada Ravalison. The band was established in 2008 in Mons, Belgium where the band had its own studio. In 2008, they showcased in a number of festivals including Les Francofolies de Spa where they performed in the new talents section of the festival with great reception prompting them to release two albums On attend, their debut in 2008 and L'indécideur in 2010. For their second album, Suarez received "Best new talent" award during Octaves de la musique, the music awards of the French Belgian market as well as "Album of the Year" for the same album. Their 2010 hit "Qu'est-ce que j'aime ça" remains their most known hit.

2011 saw the joining of David Donnat as a fifth member to the band. The band's third album En équilibre in 2014 has been a commercial success and made it to the top of the Ultratop Belgian (Wallonia) Albums Chart.

Suarez' style of music includes elements of rock, pop, acoustic music, French, English, Latin and Malagasy (Madagascar) music from where most of the members come from. The band was named after Portuguese explorer Diego Suarez who explored Madagascar where the Bay of Diego Suarez is named after him. The band has a following in Belgium, the Netherlands, France and Canada.

== Members ==
- Marc Pinilla - vocals and guitar
- Max Randriamanjava - bass and guitar, backing vocals
- Pata Randriamanjava - drums, backing vocals
- Dada Ravalison - guitar, bass, backing vocals
- David Donnat - percussions (since 2011)

== In popular culture ==
Suzarez' lead vocalist Marc Pinilla served as a coach during the second, third and sixth season, and a guest mentor on the anniversary season of The Voice Belgique, the Belgian version of the music competition show.

== Discography ==
=== Albums ===
Year	Album	Peak positions		Certification
Year	Album	BEL (Fl)	BEL (Wa)	Certification
2008	On attend	—	10	
2010	L'indécideur	—	6	Gold
2014	En équilibre	106	1	Gold
2017	Ni rancœur ni colère	—	2	
2020	Vivant	143	2	
2026	D'amour et d'aléas	—	1	

=== Singles ===
Year	Single	Peak positions			Album
Year	Single	BEL (Wa) Ultratop	BEL (Wa) Ultratip	FR	Album
2008	"On attend"	—	22	—	On attend
2009	"Juste pour voir" (Suarez & Stéphanie Crayencour)	—	11	—	On attend
2010	"Qu'est-ce que j'aime ça"	8	—	163	L'indécideur
2010	"L'indécideur"	17	—	—	L'indécideur
2011	"On s'en fout"	36	—	—	L'indécideur
2011	"Le temps de voir"	—	11	—	L'indécideur
2011	"La fin du monde"	—	1	—	Non-album release
2012	"Le temps de voir" (Léonie & Suarez)	—	6	—	En équilibre
2013	"Souffle de délire"	39	—	—	En équilibre
2014	"Au bord du gouffre"	16	—	—	En équilibre
2014	"Envoyer valser"	—	3	—	En équilibre
2017	"Ni rancœur ni colère"	14	—	—	Ni rancœur ni colère
2017	"Sur tes lèvres"	18	—	—	Ni rancœur ni colère
2019	"Dix ans"	24	—	—	Non-album singles
2020	"Cavale"	15	—	—	Non-album singles
2020	"Céleste"	49	—	—	Non-album singles
2022	"La vie devant"	40	—	—	Non-album singles
2026	"Case départ"	24	—	—	Non-album singles
