= Typh Barrow =

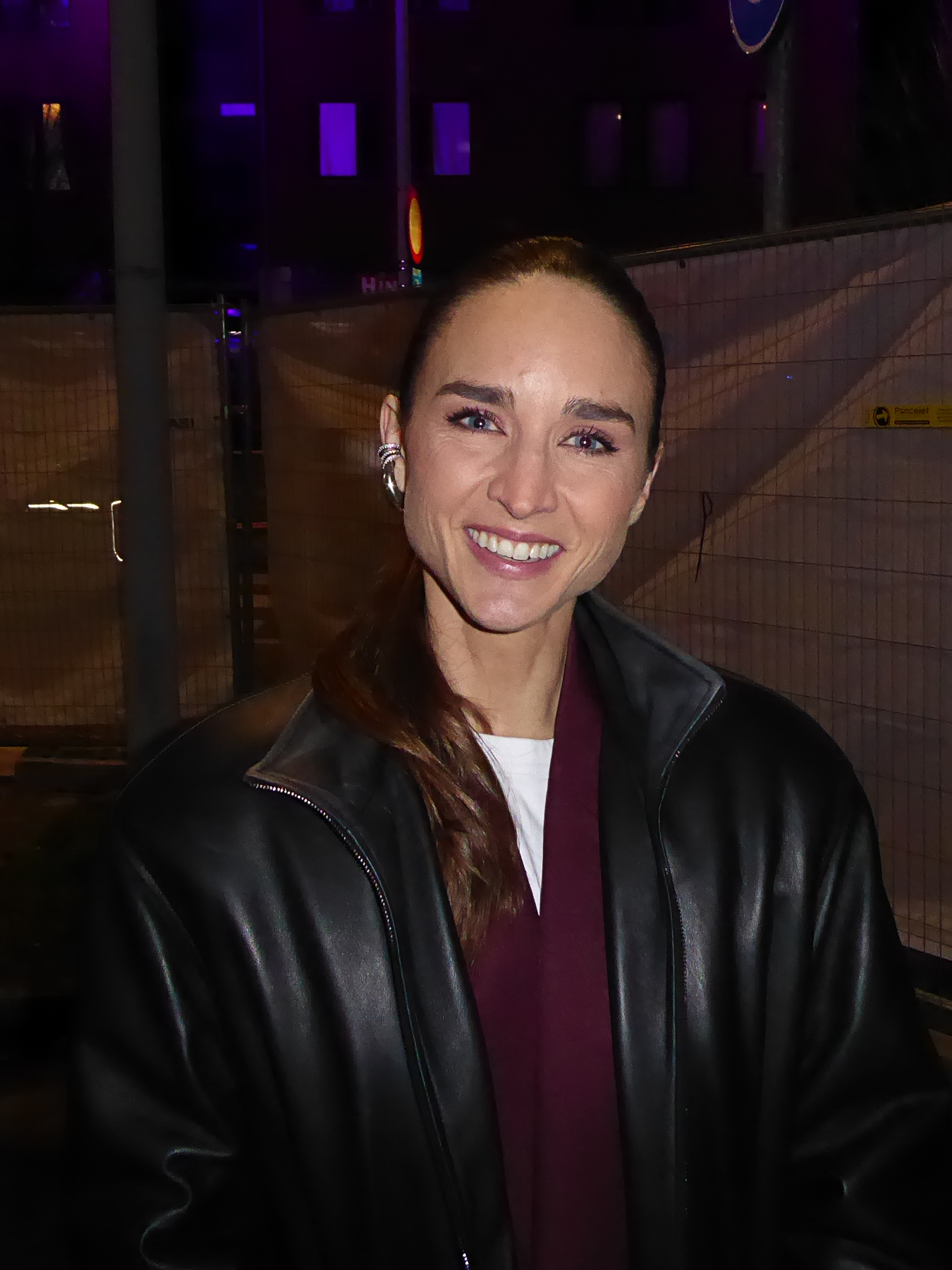
- Typh Barrow, December 2025

Background information
- Born: Tiffany Baworowski; 10 May 1987 (age 39); Brussels, Belgium
- Genres: Pop, Soul, Jazz, R&B
- Occupation: Singer-songwriter
- Instruments: Vocals; piano
- Years active: 2012–present
- Labels: Doo Wap; Visions Records
- Website: www.typhofficial.com

Typh Barrow (born 10 May 1987) is a Belgian singer, songwriter, jurist, composer and pianist, who was born in Brussels. Her style is a mixture of pop and soul music, with jazz and blues accents.

She is considered by the press to be the Belgian Adele or Amy Winehouse.

== Beginnings ==
Barrow began piano at age five, scales at eight, and wrote one of her first songs at twelve. At fourteen, she started taking singing lessons.

She learnt live performing in numerous piano bars and met her future producer and manager, François Leboutte. He had her record her first demos before launching her in the profession.

At the end of 2012, she released her first single, "Your Turn", which was warmly received by Belgian radio stations and was the most played song in the French-speaking part of Belgium in 2013.

Before the release of her first EP, she lost her voice during a live show due to a vocal fold cyst. She had to remain silent for several months to avoid undergoing an operation that might have made her lose her voice tone.

== Success ==
In 2013, Barrow started posting piano-voice covers on YouTube, which quickly achieved millions of views. Her cover of "Gangsta's Paradise" was noticed by the rapper Coolio, its original interpreter, who called it the best cover of his hit.

In 2014, she released two EPs: Time, which contained original songs and recorded in Paris, London and New York in collaboration with Tom Coyne and Volodia, and Visions, a cover EP she offers to her internet followers.

Among her most famous tracks are "Time", "To Say Goodbye", and "No Diggity". All of these tracks made the radio charts and the double EP spent several weeks in the official charts.

Following the success of these songs, she was invited to appear on TV shows, to give concerts across Europe , as well as to perform at festivals such as Les Francofolies de Spa, the Brussels Summer Festival and the Festival de Cannes.

In 2015, the RTBF music show D6bels on Stage dedicated a special edition to Barrow and the news broadcast of the same channel mentioned her among the favourites of the Francofolies de Spa's 2015 edition.

In 2016, she went to London to record her next album at Abbey Road studios, which has preserved the equipment used in the 1960s. She notably worked with Dimitri Tikovoï, Danton Supple, as well as the funk, jazz, hip-hop and soul collective The Heliocentrics. "The Whispers", the first single from these recordings, was released in March 2016.

In January 2017, she was nominated for the D6bels Music Awards in the categories "Female Artist of the Year" and "Artist Classic 21". She also released a new song, "Daddy's Not Coming Back".

On 13 October 2019, she was among various artists (including Yannick Noah, Christophe Maé, Black M, and James Blunt) to perform at RTBF's Cap48 event, (a fundraising event held mainly to help those with disabilities in the French and German communities of Belgium). The event aired live on RTBF.

She served as a coach on The Voice Kids Belgique from its second season to its third season. She won the third season with her artist Ilena Vigna. She also served as a coach on The Voice Belgique from 2019 to 2022.

== Personal life ==
Barrow was born Tiffany Baworowski in Brussels to a Polish father and Belgian mother.

Her mother tongue is French. She is also fluent in English, Spanish and Dutch.

== Discography ==
=== Studio albums ===
Title	Studio album details	Peak chart positions		Certifications
Title	Studio album details	BEL (WA)	BEL (FL)	Certifications
Raw	Released: 18 January 2018; Label: Doo Wap; Format: Digital download, CD, streaming	1	162	BEA: Gold
Aloha	Released: 17 January 2020; Label: Doo Wap; Format: Digital download, CD, streaming	1	—	BEA: Gold
Dreama	Released: 27 March 2026; Label: Visions Records; Format: Digital download, CD, vinyl, streaming; Reissued: 13 November 2026 as Dreama (Gold Edition) (14 tracks), with French-language versions of "Now Now Now" and "Miracle" ("Ici Maintenant", "La Chanson Bleue") and the bonus track "Trop Fort", her first song in French	2	—	

=== EPs ===
Title	EP details	Peak chart positions
Title	EP details	BEL (WA)
Time	Released: 2014; Label: Doo Wap; Format: Digital download, CD, streaming	50
Visions	Released: 2014; Label: Doo Wap; Format: Digital download, CD, streaming	175

=== Singles ===
Title	Year	Peak chart positions		Album
Title	Year	BEL (WA)	BEL (FL)	Album
"Your Turn"	2012	57	—	Time
"Do I Care"	2013	64	—	Time
"To Say Goodbye"	2014	88	—	Time
"No Diggity"	2014	55	—	Visions
"The Whispers"	2016	73	—	Raw
"Daddy's Not Coming Back"	2017	90	—	Raw
"Taboo"	2018	23	88	Raw
"The Absence"	2018	86	—	Raw
"Replace"	2019	10	—	Aloha
"Doesn't Really Matter"	2019	9	Tip22	Aloha
"Aloha" (featuring Gulaan)	2020	18	—	Aloha
"Don't Let Me Go"	2023	17	—	Non-album single
"Close to Me"	2025	15	—	Dreama
"Miracle"	2025	—	—	Dreama
"Now Now Now"	2026	6	—	Dreama
"On My Shoulders"	2026	15	—	Dreama
"Trop Fort"	2026	—	—	Dreama
