= Alice on the Roof =

Belgian singer

Alice Dutoit (French: [alis dytwa]), known professionally as Alice on the Roof (born 23 January 1995 in Soignies, Hainaut) is a Belgian singer. She sings in both English and French. In 2022, she became a coach for the second season of The Voice Kids Belgique and returned for the third season in 2025.

== Life ==
Her mother is an architect and her father is an electrical engineer. She studied piano and singing choral music in a music school from 2001 till 2012, and after completing a bachelor of arts, she went to Brookings, Oregon, to improve her English with a Rotary International scholarship. In Brookings, she also participated in daily piano and choir classes. She now lives in Sirault, Belgium, in the Mons area.

Her stage name comes from a word play on her surname Dutoit: 'du toit' translates from French as 'from the roof'.

Revealed during the third edition of The Voice Belgique, where she was eliminated during the semi-finals, she published her first single Easy come easy go in April 2015, with the help of Marc Pinilla. The single gets a huge success in her homeland, where he is the fourth best selling single of the year 2015. It reached number 1 in the Ultratop and stayed in the list for thirty-five weeks. It also reached the 43rd position of the Ultratop in Flanders. Alice on the Roof received a golden record on 27 November 2015 for this title. Her second single, Mystery Light, reached the fifth position in Wallonia Ultratop and thirty-fifth position in Flanders. Alice has cited her parents and Kate Bush as inspiration for her music and lyrics.

Her first album, Higher, was released on 22 January 2016. It reached the top position on the Ultratop Wallonia et 17 in Flanders.

Alice on the Roof received three awards (the awards of solo artist of the year, breakthrough of the year, and PureFM artist of the year) during the first edition of the D6Bels Music Awards. She received the pop artist award for 2018 during the 4th D6Bels Music Awards.

In 2017, her song track Easy Come Easy Go was included in the soundtrack of the Belgian-French comedy Don't Tell Her.

In 2018, the first single of her second album, Malade, co-written with French author, composer and singer Vianney was released, followed by "How Long" and "T'as quitté la planète" in 2019.

On 17 March 2019 she was the guest of Joelle Schoriels on Belgian TV (RTBF) for "69 minutes sans chichis". On 30 March 2019 she gave a show in Forest National, with Vianney as a surprise guest. Excerpts of this show can be seen in the clip of her latest single, "La Fille sur le Toit", completely shot in the Forest.

Alice on the Roof toured Belgium and France in 2019. In October 2019, she performed in Paris during 5 evenings the first part of Vincent Delerm at La Cigale.

Alice Dutoit will play one of the main parts in a Belgian movie which is scheduled to be released in 2020.

== Discography ==
=== Albums ===
- Higher (2016)
- Madame (2018)

=== EPs ===
- Easy Come Easy Go (2015)
- EP de Malade (2018)

=== Singles ===
- "Mystery Light" (2016)
- "Lucky You" (2016)
- "Malade" (2018)
- "How Long" (2018)
- "La fille sur le toit" (2019)

== Nominations ==
- 2016: Berlin Music Video Awards, Best Cinematography for 'EASY COME EASY GO'
