= Henri PFR =

Belgian DJ, musician and composer

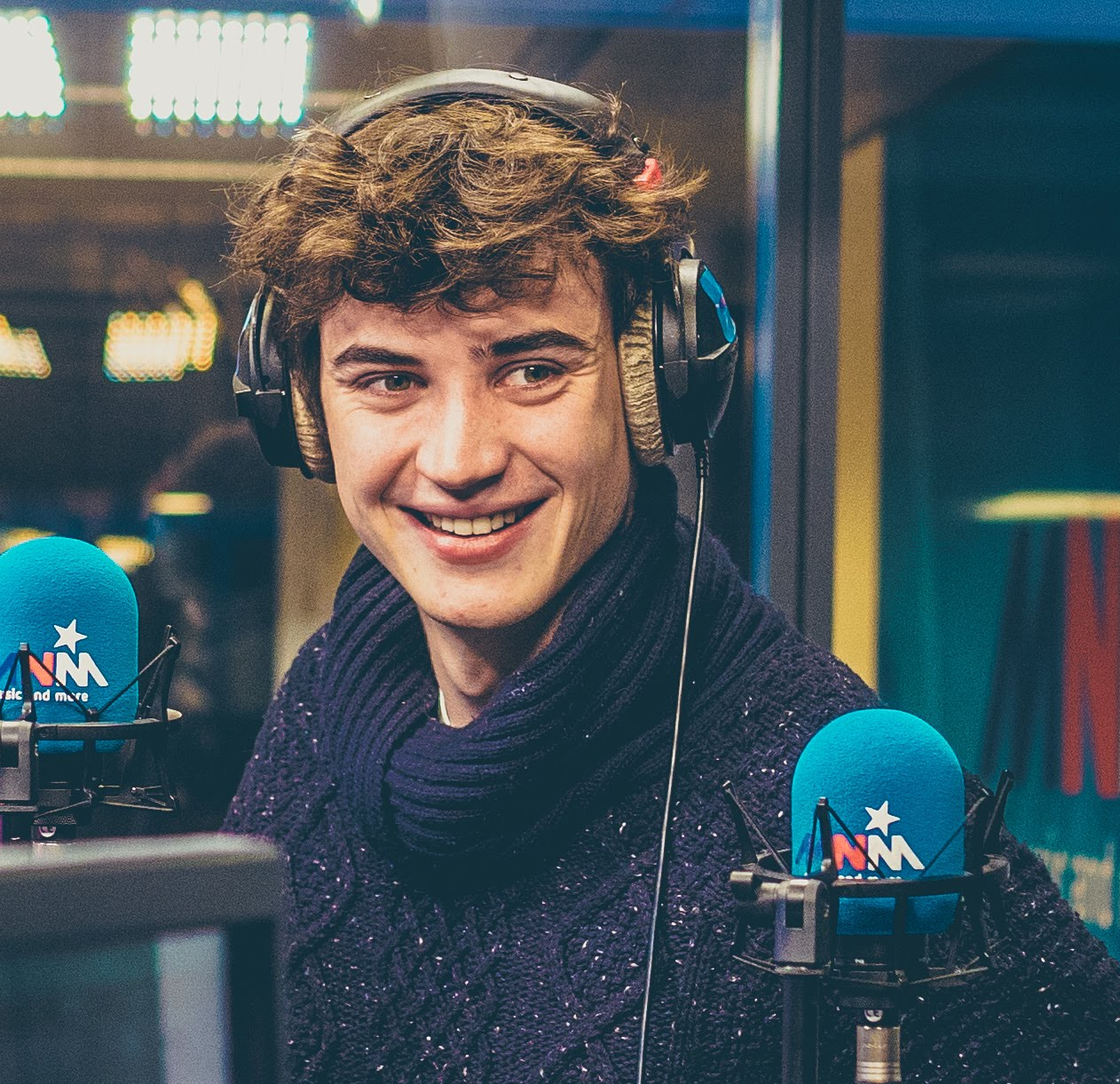

Background information
- Born: Henri Peiffer; 26 September 1995 (age 31); Brussels, Belgium
- Genre: Tropical house
- Occupations: DJ; musician; composer
- Instrument: Piano
- Labels: Sony Music; Armada Music
- Website: www.henripfr.com

Henri Peiffer (born 26 September 1995 in Brussels), known professionally as Henri PFR, is a Belgian DJ, musician and composer.

== Early life and career ==
From the age of six, he spent nine years training in classical piano and studying musical theory. It was around the age of fourteen that young Peiffer first became interested in electronic music. He posted his first mixtape Summer Memories online on the "La Belle Musique" YouTube channel which, with more than 70 million views, caught the attention of Armin van Buuren's Armada label, with which he signed his first two singles, including "Tarida".

He has collaborated with German producer Robin Schulz, for whom he remixed the track "Sugar". Together they produced "Wave Goodbye", a song which is featured on Robin Schulz's album Sugar, released in 2015. Peiffer's music was later released on Sony Music, featuring "One People", "Home" and in October 2016, "Until the End", which remained at the top of the Belgian charts for several months and went platinum in Belgium.

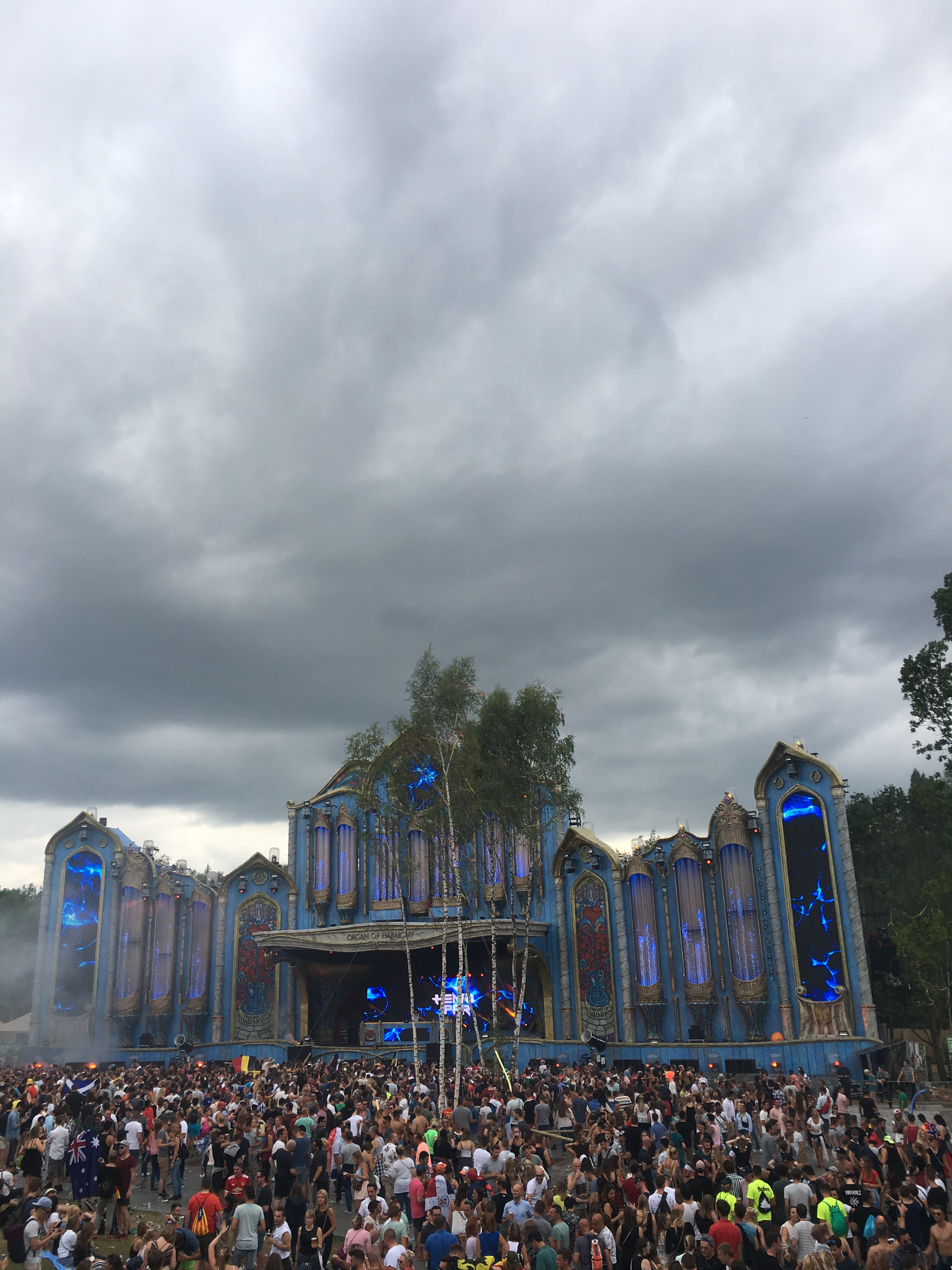
One of the Tomorrowland stages, during the Henri PFR set (2017, july).

In January 2017, he received the Pure (Belgian radio) Newcomer Award at the D6bels Music Awards. In September 2017, he was honoured by the Walloon Brabant province during the Orchid Ceremony, winning an "Orchid" in the Culture category for having contributed to the profile of the province of Walloon Brabant. In October 2017, he received the International Newcomer of the Year Award at the Fun Radio DJ Awards during the Amsterdam Dance Event.

== Discography ==
=== Charted singles ===
Title	Year	Peak chart positions			
Title	Year	BEL (Fl)	BEL (Wa)	BEL (Fl) Tip	BEL (Wa) Tip
"Tarida" (with Stone van Brooken)	2014	—	—	—	2
"Until the End" (featuring Raphaella)	2016	11	3	—	—
"Home"	2016	—	45	—	—
"In the Mood" (with Romeo Blanco featuring Veronica)	2017	19	8	—	—
"Flames"	2017	—	14	24	—
"Bullet" (featuring Ozark Henry)	2018	—	—	15	26
"Catching Butterflies" (with HIDDN)	2018	46	31	31	21
"Easy" (featuring Susan H)	2019	—	—	8	4
"Wake Up" (with Broken Back)	2019	—	20	—	—
"Going On" (featuring Soran)	2019	29	26	1	9
"Loving Myself" (featuring Raphaella)	2019	—	37	1	20
"No One Knows" (with Famba featuring Chiara Castelli)	2020	47	21	1	—
"Bruises" (with Madism featuring Lono)	2021	—	—	1	—
"The Feeling" (with Gabry Ponte)	2021	31	40	—	—
"Bed" (with Rozes featuring Kshmr)	2022	—	38	—	—
"Wanna Be Loved" (with FDVM featuring PolyAnna)	2024	—	20	—	—
"Last Night" (featuring Sadie Rose Van)	2024	—	47	—	—
"Run" (featuring Ragdoll)	2025	—	10	—	—
"The Night (Belongs to Lovers)"	2026	—	44	—	—
"Sola" (with Dr. Chaii)	2026	47	9	—	—
"Make Love" (with Carston)	2026	—	48	—	—
"—" denotes a recording that did not chart or was not released.
