= Cats on Trees =

French musical duo

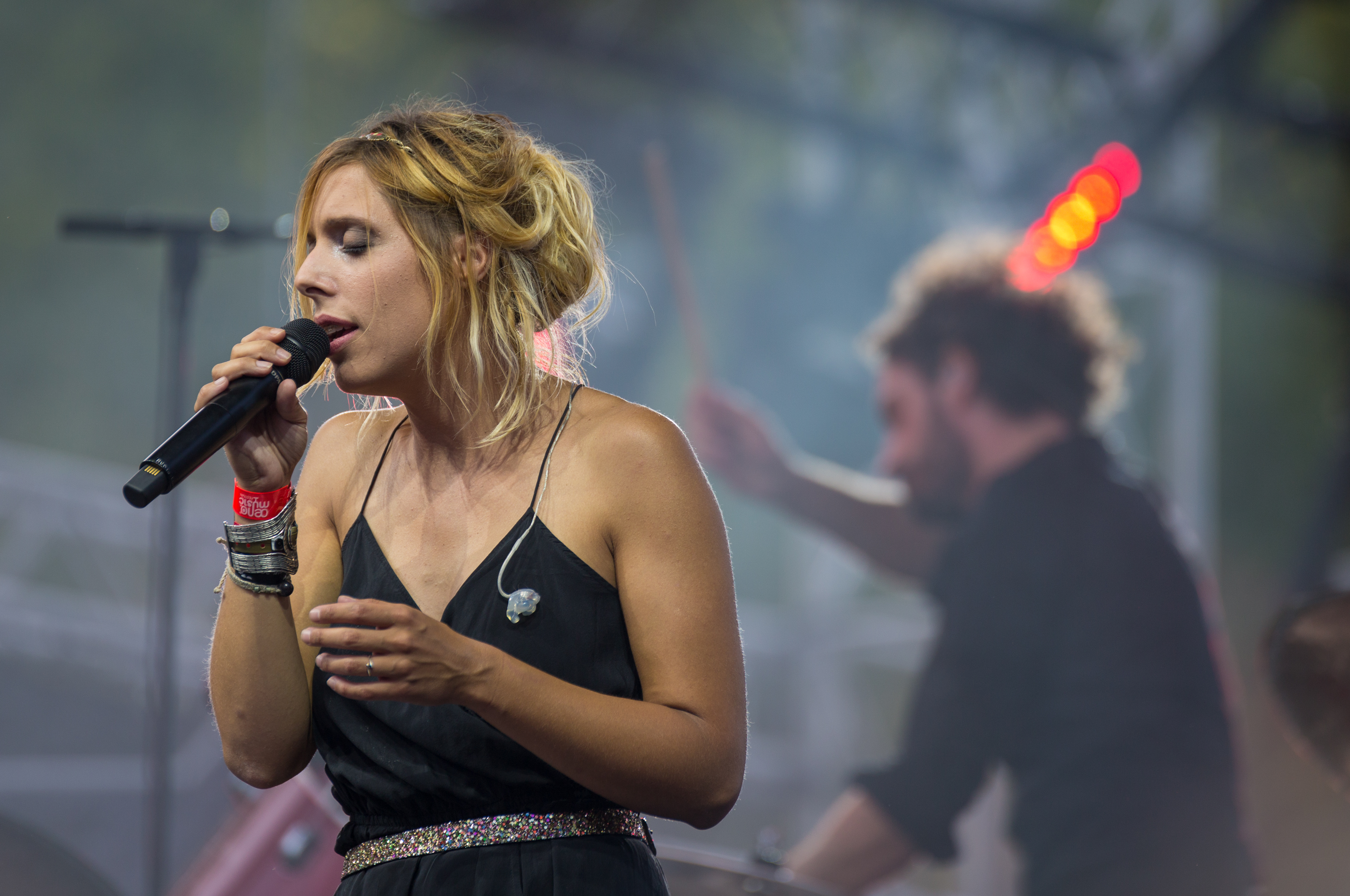
- Cats on Trees in 14th of July 2015's national holiday concert in Toulouse, France

Background information
- Origin: Toulouse, France
- Genres: Pop
- Years active: 2007–present
- Labels: Tôt ou Tard
- Members: Nina Goern; Yohan Hennequin
- Website: catsontrees.com (French)

Cats on Trees is a French musical duo formed in Toulouse (Occitanie), France in 2007 by Nina Goern (on vocals and piano) and Yohan Hennequin (rhythms). Before the duo, Goern was part of Aeria Microcosm and Hennequin part of My Own Private Alaska. The duo specializing in ambient indie pop released their EP followed by their debut self-titled album in 2013 Cats on Trees. "Sirens Call" is the duo's first single.

== Discography ==
=== Albums ===
Year	Album	Peak positions				Certification
Year	Album	FR	BEL (Vl)	BEL (Wa)	SWI	Certification
2013	Cats on Trees	9	197	10	81	
2018	Neon	17	–	40	–	
2022	Alie	40	–	–	–	

=== Singles ===
Year	Single	Peak positions				Album
Year	Single	FR	BEL (Vl)	BEL (Wa)	SWI	Album
2013	"Sirens Call"	3	82* (Ultratip)	4	44	Cats on Trees
2013	"Burn"	–	–	–	–	Cats on Trees
2014	"Jimmy"	87	–	32* (Ultratip)	–	Cats on Trees
2014	"Love You like a Love Song"	41	–	22* (Ultratip)	–	Cats on Trees (Deluxe edition)
2015	"Jimmy" (feat. Calogero)	36	–	1* (Ultratip)	–	
2018	"Keep on Dancing"	17	–	17* (Ultratip)	–	TBA

*Did not appear in the official Belgian Ultratop 50 charts, but rather in the bubbling under Ultratip charts.
