= Bandits (Belgian band) =

Belgian teen pop rock band

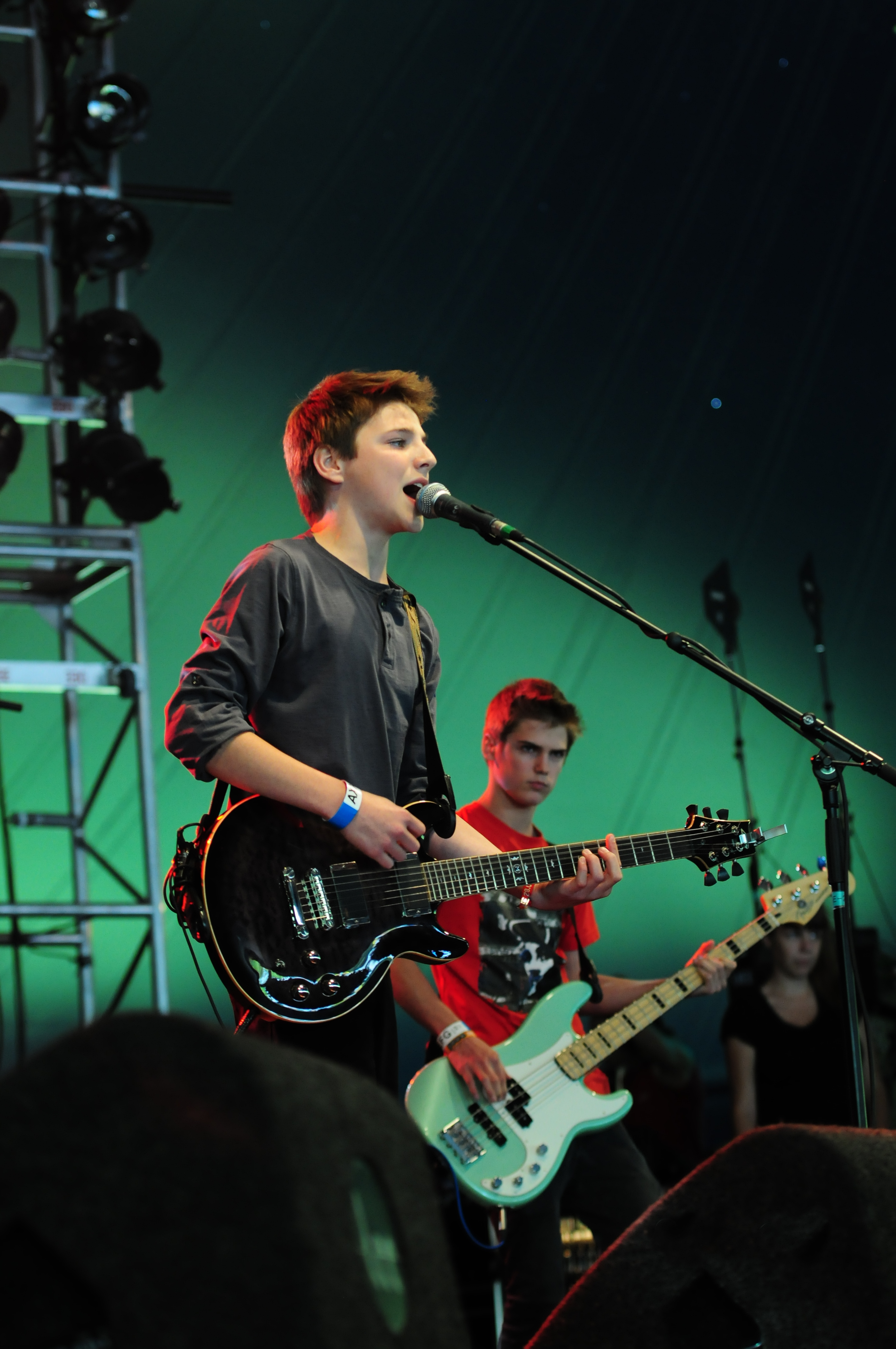
- Jasper and Thomas during a concert in 2012.

Background information
- Origin: Belgium
- Genres: Pop rock
- Years active: 2011–2017
- Labels: Pias
- Members: Jasper Publie; Toon Smet; Tim Tielemans; Thomas Van Achteren
- Website: bandits.be

Bandits is a Flemish teen Pop rock band, current members are lead vocalist Jasper Publie (1996), drummer Toon Smet (1997), guitarist Tim Tielemans (1998) and bassist Thomas Van Achteren (1995). Jasper Publie's father, Jan Publie, and Toon Smet's father are roadies of the band.

== History ==
=== The beginnings, Gizonband 2010 ===
The band Bandits has emerged from the band Gizonband (guitar without notes). Publie, Tielemans and Van Achteren already knew each other from the guitar school. When Jasper Publie participated in the Belgian pre-selections for the Junior Eurovision Song Contest in 2007, he met Toon Smet.

The band was active from 2007 until the name change in 2011. The Gizonband has played at Maanrock 2010 on the mainstage. The new name was meant as a wordplay on 'band', initially they wanted to call it Bandit, but there already existed a band with that name. Their target audience are teens; female fans call themselves Bandita's, the boys Bandito's.

=== 2011 ===
The Bandits performed several shows in Belgium in 2011. The first major event which they participated was Pennenzakkenrock. A reality show that went by the same name about the Bandits aired on VTMKZOOM. Meanwhile, they released three singles: Stop!, Tweelingzus and 't Kan niet op. On November 23, their first album Bandits was released at the theater Theadrôme in Wilrijk. They were also a guest on Ketnet King Size (November 27) and Jim (December 21).

=== 2012 ===
In 2012 Bandits was one of the bands that received a dedicated episode in the quiz show I-fans on Ketnet. At January 18 the band received an Anne Award in the category "beste kids pop". On January 21, the band was again invited, without bassist Van Achteren due to illness, for Ketnet King Size. They revealed that they made an amateur film in the summer break between festivals. In November 2012 also participated in the first edition of the program VTMKZOOM Pop.

=== 2013 ===
On April 19, Bandits performed at the Sportpaleis during Nekka-Nacht, with the implementation of Iedereen is van de wereld by the Dutch band The Scene along with Thé Lau. The single Time Bomb scored in Thailand and hit the iTunes playlist. On July 4, Publie was a guest at the music station Channel V. This was at the beginning of the journey through Thailand of the Publie family.

During the summer the band could be seen at numerous festivals in Belgium, including Gentse Feesten, Marktrock and for a first time in the Netherlands. At the end of 2013, on November 1, Bandits have given a private concert at the Lotto Arena in Antwerp. On the same day Bandits & Friends was also presented, their new CD.

=== 2014 ===
In the spring of 2014 Bandits took part in the Belgian Eurosong 2014, the nationwide preselection for the Eurovision Song Contest 2014. On February 16, they placed themselves, with the most votes during the callback, for the semi-finals. Here they finished second, which gave them the right to participate in the finals. In the grand finale, they were also the second, after Axel Hirsoux.

=== 2015 ===
At June 24 there was a releaseparty for their new album, called Geval Apart.

== Discography ==
=== Albums ===
Year	Album
2011	Bandits
2014	Bandits live en akoestisch
2015	Bandits geval apart

=== Singles ===
Year	Single
2011	"Stop!"
2011	"Tweelingzus"
2013	"Tijdbom"
2014	"Voorbij"
2015	"'t Ga wenen van komen"
2015	"Slapen zal ik niet laten"
2016	"No Next Time"
