= Mother (Axel Hirsoux song) =

2014 song by Axel Hirsoux

Single by Axel Hirsoux
- Released: 10 March 2014
- Recorded: 2013–14
- Genre: Pop
- Length: 3:00
- Label: VRT Line Extensions
- Songwriter(s): Ashley Hicklin; Rafael Artesero
- Producer(s): David Poltrock

Axel Hirsoux singles chronology
"Mother" (2014)	"Bellissimo" (2014)

Eurovision Song Contest 2014 entry
- Country: Belgium
- Artist(s): Axel Hirsoux
- Language: English
- Composer(s): Ashley Hicklin & Rafael Artesero
- Lyricist(s): Ashley Hicklin & Rafael Artesero

Finals performance
- Semi-final result: 14th
- Semi-final points: 28

Entry chronology
- ◄ "Love Kills" (2013)
- "Rhythm Inside" (2015) ►

"Mother" is a song by Belgian singer Axel Hirsoux. It was chosen to represent Belgium at the Eurovision Song Contest 2014 in Denmark after winning Eurosong 2014. The song was written by Spanish songwriter Rafael Artesero, who also composed the 2005 and 2006 Andorran entries "La mirada interior" and "Sense tu" and British songwriter Ashley Hicklin, who also composed the 2010 Belgium Eurovision entry "Me and My Guitar" performed by Tom Dice.

== Track listing ==
Digital download
No.	Title	Length
1.	"Mother" (Eurosong 2014)	3:00

== Charts ==
Chart (2014)	Peak position
Belgium (Ultratop 50 Flanders)	7
Belgium (Ultratop 50 Wallonia)	32

== Release history ==
Region	Date	Format	Label
Belgium	10 March 2014	Digital download	VRT Line Extensions
