= Belgium in the Eurovision Song Contest 2014 =

- Eurovision Song Contest 2014
- Participating broadcaster: Vlaamse Radio- en Televisieomroeporganisatie (VRT)
- Country: Belgium
- Selection process: Eurosong 2014
- Selection date: 16 March 2014

Competing entry
- Song: "Mother"
- Artist: Axel Hirsoux
- Songwriters: Rafael Artesero; Ashley Hicklin

Placement
- Semi-final result: Failed to qualify (14th)

Participation chronology

Belgium was represented at the Eurovision Song Contest 2014 with the song "Mother", written by Ashley Hicklin and Rafael Artesero, and performed by Axel Hirsoux. The Belgian participating broadcaster, Flemish Vlaamse Radio- en Televisieomroeporganisatie (VRT), selected its entry through the national final Eurosong 2014. The competition featured thirty competing acts and consisted of seven shows. In the final on 16 March 2014, "Mother" performed by Axel Hirsoux was selected as the winner via the votes of seven international jury groups and a public televote.

Belgium was drawn to compete in the first semi-final of the Eurovision Song Contest which took place on 6 May 2014. Performing during the show in position 10, "Mother" was not announced among the top 10 entries of the first semi-final and therefore did not qualify to compete in the final. It was later revealed that Belgium placed fourteenth out of the 16 participating countries in the semi-final with 28 points.

== Background ==
Prior to the 2014 contest, Belgium had participated in the Eurovision Song Contest fifty-five times since its debut as one of seven countries to take part in 1956. Since then, they have won the contest on one occasion in 1986 with the song "J'aime la vie", performed by Sandra Kim. Following the introduction of semi-finals for the 2004 contest, Belgium had been featured in only three finals. In 2013, "Love Kills" by Roberto Bellarosa qualified to the final and placed twelfth.

The Belgian participation in the contest alternates between two broadcasters: Flemish Vlaamse Radio- en Televisieomroeporganisatie (VRT) and Walloon Radio-télévision belge de la Communauté française (RTBF) at the time, with both broadcasters sharing the broadcasting rights. Both broadcasters –and their predecessors– had selected the Belgian entry using national finals and internal selections in the past. In 2012 and 2013, both VRT and RTBF internally selected an artist to represent Belgium and organised a national final in order to select the song. On 3 June 2013, VRT confirmed its participation in the 2014 contest and announced that the Eurosong national final would be held to select its entry. This marked the return of a multi-artist Eurosong for the first time since 2008.

== Before Eurovision ==
=== Eurosong 2014 ===
Eurosong 2014 was the national final that selected Belgium's entry in the Eurovision Song Contest 2014. The competition consisted of seven shows that commenced on 2 February 2014 and concluded with a final on 16 March 2014 where the winning song and artist were selected. All shows were hosted by Eva Daeleman and Peter Van de Veire and broadcast on Eén as well as online at the broadcaster's Eurosong website eurosong.een.be. The final was also broadcast online at the official Eurovision Song Contest website eurovision.tv.

==== Format ====
Thirty artists were selected to compete in Eurosong. Two casting shows aired on 2 and 9 February 2014 with each show featuring fifteen of the artists auditioning in front of an expert jury by performing a cover version of a past Eurovision Song Contest song. The top four as determined by jury directly qualified to the semi-finals, while the fifth to eighth placed acts advanced to the Call Back round. The Call Back round took place on 16 February 2014 where an additional four artists as determined by an expert jury and public televoting qualified to the semi-finals. Three semi-finals took place on 23 February 2014, 3 March 2014 and 9 March 2014 where each artist presented their candidate Eurovision song. Each show featured four artists and the top two as determined by an expert jury and public televoting qualified to the final. The final took place on 16 March 2014 where the winner was chosen by seven international jury groups and public televoting.

During each of the seven shows, the expert jury provided commentary and feedback to the artists as well as selected entries to advance in the competition. The experts were:

- Bart Peeters – singer and television presenter
- Piet Goddaer – musician known by his stage name Ozark Henry
- Jef Martens – musician and DJ known by various aliases such as Basto and Lazy Jay
- Ruslana – Ukrainian singer, winner of the Eurovision Song Contest 2004

==== Competing entries ====
On 1 October 2013, VRT opened two separate submission forms: one for artists to submit a video recording of them performing a cover version of a past Eurovision Song Contest song and another for songwriters to submit their songs. The submission deadline for the two applications concluded on 14 October 2013 and 28 October 2013, respectively. The names of the thirty acts selected for the competition were announced on 24 January 2014. Among the competing artists were former Eurovision Song Contest participants Veronica Codesal (member of Aelia), who represented Belgium in 2003 as part of the group Urban Trad, and Kate Ryan (lead singer of Day One), who represented Belgium in 2006. Sixteen songs were selected from those received during the submission period and matched with the artists that advanced from the casting shows. The jury panel that selected both the artists and songs for the competition consisted of Bart Peeters, Piet Goddaer, Jef Martens and Ruslana. The four artists that failed to advance from the Call Back round to the semi-finals (Jessy, Joyce, Mr. Jones and White Bird) were also matched with a candidate Eurovision song but did not perform them during the competition.

Artist	Song	Songwriter(s)
2 Fabiola feat. Loredana	"She's After My Piano"	Ovidiu Jacobsen, Phillip Halloun, Simen Eriksrud, Cecilie Harboe
Axeela	"Chasing Rainbows"	Bernd Klimpel, Dimitri Ehrlich, Lauren Amaris
Axel Hirsoux	"Mother"	Ashley Hicklin, Rafael Artesero
Bandits	"One"	Tony Adams Rosa
Day One	"Whoever You Are"	Yves Gaillard
Eva Jacobs	"Nothing Is Impossible"	Mick Lee, Pernille Georgi, Chris "Ruff Diamond" Robinson
Jessy	"Beautiful"	Jessy De Smet, Yves Gaillard, Tim Burkes
Joyce	"I Think I"	Joyce Lemmens, Robbe Tom Balis, Wouter Vander Veken
Mr. Jones	"Still Believe"	Patrick Hamilton, Vincent Pierins, Tom Eeckhout
Nelson	"Wild Side"	Nelson Moraïs, Yves Gaillard
Petra	"Killer Touch"	Georgie Dennis, Christopher Wortley, Paul Drew, Greig Watts, Pete Barringer
Sil	"What's the Time in Tokyo?"	Marcella Detroit, Marcus Winther-John, Paul Drew, Greig Watts, Pete Barringer
Tisha Cyrus	"Kitty Cat"	Big John Snr, Yves Gaillard
Udo	"Hero (In Flanders Fields)"	Pokka Jr., Nadge, Udo Mechels
White Bird	"Fire and Ice"	Tom Helsen, Yannick Fonderie
Yass	"Need You Tonight"	Yass Smaali, Yves Gaillard, Ashley Hicklin, Leon Paul Palmen, Rupert Blackman

==== Casting shows ====
The two casting shows aired on 2 and 9 February 2014 and took place at the Sportpaleis in Antwerp. Both shows were filmed earlier on 3 December 2013.In each show fifteen artists performed a cover version of a past Eurovision Song Contest song and an expert jury determined four acts that qualified to the semi-finals and an additional four acts that advanced to the Call Back round. Jury member Ruslana did not vote during both shows as she was unable to attend the casting shows due to her involvement in the pro-European Union protests in Ukraine.

Show 1 – 2 February 2014
R/O	Artist	Song	B. Peeters	P. Goddaer	J. Martens	Average	Place	Result
1	Joyce	"Mister" (Note: Performed as "Sister" by the original artist.) (Sergio and the Ladies)	88	78	79	82	5	Call Back
2	The Exclusive Strings	"Hard Rock Hallelujah" (Lordi)	72	64	68	68	15	—N/a
3	White Bird	"Fly on the Wings of Love" (Olsen Brothers)	84	79	77	80	8	Call Back
4	Eva Jacobs	"In Your Eyes" (Niamh Kavanagh)	86	85	86	86	3	Semi-final
5	The Fuckuleles	"Waterloo" (ABBA)	76	80	73	76	10	—N/a
6	Jessy	"Euphoria" (Loreen)	86	82	75	81	7	Call Back
7	Gracious Wild	"In Love for a While" (Anna Rossinelli)	76	76	65	72	12	—N/a
8	Violet Sky	"Door de wind" (Ingeborg)	76	73	69	73	11	—N/a
9	Axel Hirsoux	"Tu te reconnaîtras" (Anne-Marie David)	86	82	83	84	4	Semi-final
10	3M8S	"Only Teardrops" (Emmelie de Forest)	75	75	62	71	14	—N/a
11	Nelson	"Glorious" (Cascada)	90	89	80	86	2	Semi-final
12	Elvya Dulcimer	"Sweet People" (Alyosha)	76	70	69	72	12	—N/a
13	2 Fabiola feat. Loredana	"My Number One" (Helena Paparizou)	84	81	79	81	6	Call Back
14	Di Stephano	"L'amour ça fait chanter la vie" (Jean Vallée)	80	79	75	78	9	—N/a
15	Udo	"Ne partez pas sans moi" (Celine Dion)	96	95	89	93	1	Semi-final

Show 2 – 9 February 2014
R/O	Artist	Song (Original artists)	B. Peeters	P. Goddaer	J. Martens	Average	Place	Result
1	Soulbrothers	"Puppet on a String" (Sandie Shaw)	74	66	65	68	13	—N/a
2	Mr. Jones	"Standing Still" (Roman Lob)	84	82	74	80	8	Call Back
3	Sil	"Where Are You?" (Imaani)	86	85	80	84	6	Call Back
4	Aelia	"Poupée de cire, poupée de son" (France Gall)	74	66	65	68	14	—N/a
5	Tisha Cyrus	"Düm Tek Tek" (Hadise)	90	86	81	86	3	Semi-final
6	Yass	"L'oiseau et l'enfant" (Marie Myriam)	92	89	85	89	2	Semi-final
7	Day One	"Satellite" (Lena)	91	89	75	85	5	Call Back
8	Dina Rodrigues	"Ne partez pas sans moi" (Celine Dion)	72	72	70	71	12	—N/a
9	Andrei Lugovski	"In a Moment Like This" (Chanée and N'evergreen)	76	75	74	75	10	—N/a
10	Bastien	"Fly on the Wings of Love" (Olsen Brothers)	82	78	76	79	9	—N/a
11	Maureen	"Ding-a-dong" (Teach-In)	77	75	69	74	11	—N/a
12	Manuel Palomo	"Eres tú" (Mocedades)	66	60	62	63	15	—N/a
13	Axeela	"Believe" (Dima Bilan)	88	84	83	85	4	Semi-final
14	Bandits	"Geef het op" (Clouseau)	88	81	80	83	7	Call Back
15	Petra	"All Kinds of Everything" (Dana)	94	92	89	92	1	Semi-final

==== Call Back ====
The Call Back round took place on 9 February 2014 at the Videohouse in Vilvoorde. The eight artists that placed fifth to eighth in the preceding two casting shows each performed a cover version of a past Eurovision Song Contest song and the combination of results from an expert jury and a public televote determined the top four that qualified to the semi-finals.

Call Back – 16 February 2014
R/O	Artist	Song	Jury Votes						Place
R/O	Artist	Song	B. Peeters	P. Goddaer	J. Martens	Ruslana	Average	Rank	Place
1	White Bird	"Love Shine a Light" (Katrina and the Waves)	88	84	75	80	82	4	5
2	Jessy	"Je t'adore" (Kate Ryan)	78	80	60	60	70	6	6
3	Mr. Jones	"My Star" (Brainstorm)	72	65	50	50	59	8	7
4	Bandits	Eurovision Medley (Note: Medley of "Anne" originally performed by Clouseau (from the 1989 Belgian national final), "Jennifer Jennings" originally performed by Louis Neefs and "Only Teardrops" originally performed by Emmelie de Forest.)	95	87	80	86	87	3	1
5	Joyce	"Save Your Kisses for Me" (Brotherhood of Man)	78	70	55	70	68	7	8
6	Day One	"Nocturne" (Secret Garden)	95	98	80	90	91	1	3
7	Sil	"J'aime la vie" (Sandra Kim)	93	92	81	90	89	2	2
8	2 Fabiola feat. Loredana	"Euphoria" (Loreen)	90	80	65	65	75	5	4

==== Semi-finals ====
The three semi-finals took place on 23 February, 2 March and 9 March 2014 at the Videohouse in Vilvoorde. In each show four artists performed their candidate songs for the 2014 Eurovision Song Contest and the combination of results from an expert jury and a public televote determined the top two that qualified to the final.

Semi-final 1 – 23 February 2014
R/O	Artist	Song	Jury Votes						Place
R/O	Artist	Song	B. Peeters	P. Goddaer	J. Martens	Ruslana	Average	Rank	Place
1	Day One	"Whoever You Are"	96	98	80	85	90	2	3
2	Eva Jacobs	"Nothing Is Impossible"	95	90	90	90	91	1	1
3	Udo	"Hero (In Flanders Fields)"	85	70	69	75	75	3	2
4	Petra	"Killer Touch"	86	75	68	70	75	4	4

Semi-final 2 – 2 March 2014
R/O	Artist	Song	Jury Votes						Place
R/O	Artist	Song	B. Peeters	P. Goddaer	J. Martens	Ruslana	Average	Rank	Place
1	Axeela	"Chasing Rainbows"	88	78	72	85	81	4	4
2	Yass	"Need You Tonight"	95	90	80	92	89	2	2
3	2 Fabiola feat. Loredana	"She's After My Piano"	90	80	75	90	84	3	3
4	Sil	"What's the Time in Tokyo?"	96	95	87	95	93	1	1

Semi-final 3 – 9 March 2014
R/O	Artist	Song	Jury Votes						Place
R/O	Artist	Song	B. Peeters	P. Goddaer	J. Martens	Ruslana	Average	Rank	Place
1	Nelson	"Wild Side"	92	84	72	85	83	3	3
2	Axel Hirsoux	"Mother"	98	100	99	100	99	1	1
3	Tisha Cyrus	"Kitty Cat"	88	60	50	75	68	4	4
4	Bandits	"One"	97	88	78	95	90	2	2

==== Final ====
The final took place on 16 March 2014 at the Sportpaleis in Antwerp where the six entries that qualified from the preceding three semi-finals competed. The winner, "Mother" performed by Axel Hirsoux, was selected by the combination of results from seven international jury groups and a public televote. The public and the jury each had a total of 280 points to award. Each of the jury groups awarded points in the following manner: 4, 6, 8, 10 and 12 points, while the televote awarded points based on the percentage of votes each song achieved. For example, if a song gained 10% of the viewer vote, then that entry would be awarded 10% of 280 points rounded to the nearest integer: 28 points. The expert panel participated in the final solely in an advisory role.

Final – 16 March 2014
R/O	Artist	Song	Jury	Televote	Total	Place
1	Yass	"Need You Tonight"	58	19	77	4
2	Sil	"What's the Time in Tokyo?"	32	6	38	5
3	Udo	"Hero (In Flanders Fields)"	22	10	32	6
4	Bandits	"One"	42	48	90	2
5	Eva Jacobs	"Nothing Is Impossible"	52	37	89	3
6	Axel Hirsoux	"Mother"	74	160	234	1

Detailed International Jury Votes
R/O	Song	Denmark	Belarus	Spain	Macedonia	Netherlands	Azerbaijan	Ireland	Total
R/O	Song	Denmark	Belarus	Spain	North Macedonia	Netherlands	Azerbaijan	Ireland	Total
1	"Need You Tonight"	12	12	10	8	8	8		58
2	"What's the Time in Tokyo?"	4		4	6	6	6	6	32
3	"Hero (In Flanders Fields)"	6	4				4	8	22
4	"One"		6	8	4	10	10	4	42
5	"Nothing Is Impossible"	10	10	6	12	4		10	52
6	"Mother"	8	8	12	10	12	12	12	74

==== Ratings ====
Viewing figures by show
Show	Date	Viewing figures		Ref.
Show	Date	Nominal	Share	Ref.
Casting show 1	2 February 2014	1,193,662	45.82%	
Casting show 2	9 February 2014	1,287,527	47.42%	
Call Back	16 February 2014	1,264,901	49.22%	
Semi-final 1	23 February 2014	1,272,961	47.20%	
Semi-final 2	2 March 2014	1,262,317	46.71%	
Semi-final 3	9 March 2014	1,206,126	47.06%	
Final	16 March 2014	1,383,045	51.92%	

=== Promotion ===
On 14 April, Axel Hirsoux filmed the music video for "Mother" at the Vaudeville Theater in Brussels together with 200 mothers that VRT sought through an application period. The video was released to the public on 25 April. Axel Hirsoux specifically promoted "Mother" as the Belgian Eurovision entry on 31 March 2014 by performing during the Eurovision in Concert event which was held at the Melkweg venue in Amsterdam, Netherlands and hosted by Cornald Maas and Sandra Reemer.

== At Eurovision ==
Axel Hirsoux presenting himself and "Mother" at the Eurovision Song Contest 2014

According to Eurovision rules, all nations with the exceptions of the host country and the "Big Five" (France, Germany, Italy, Spain and the United Kingdom) are required to qualify from one of two semi-finals in order to compete for the final; the top ten countries from each semi-final progress to the final. The European Broadcasting Union (EBU) split up the competing countries into six different pots based on voting patterns from previous contests, with countries with favourable voting histories put into the same pot. On 20 January 2014, a special allocation draw was held which placed each country into one of the two semi-finals, as well as which half of the show they would perform in. Belgium was placed into the first semi-final, to be held on 6 May 2014, and was scheduled to perform in the second half of the show.

Once all the competing songs for the 2014 contest had been released, the running order for the semi-finals was decided by the shows' producers rather than through another draw, so that similar songs were not placed next to each other. Belgium was set to perform in position 10, following the entry from Ukraine and before the entry from Moldova.

The two semi-finals and the final was broadcast in Belgium by both the Flemish and Walloon broadcasters. VRT broadcast the shows on één and Radio 2 with commentary in Dutch by Peter Van de Veire and Eva Daeleman. RTBF televised the shows on La Une with commentary in French by Jean-Louis Lahaye and Maureen Louys. The final was also broadcast by RTBF on VivaCité with commentary in French by Olivier Gilain. The Belgian spokesperson, who announced the Belgian votes during the final, was Angelique Vlieghe.

=== Semi-final ===
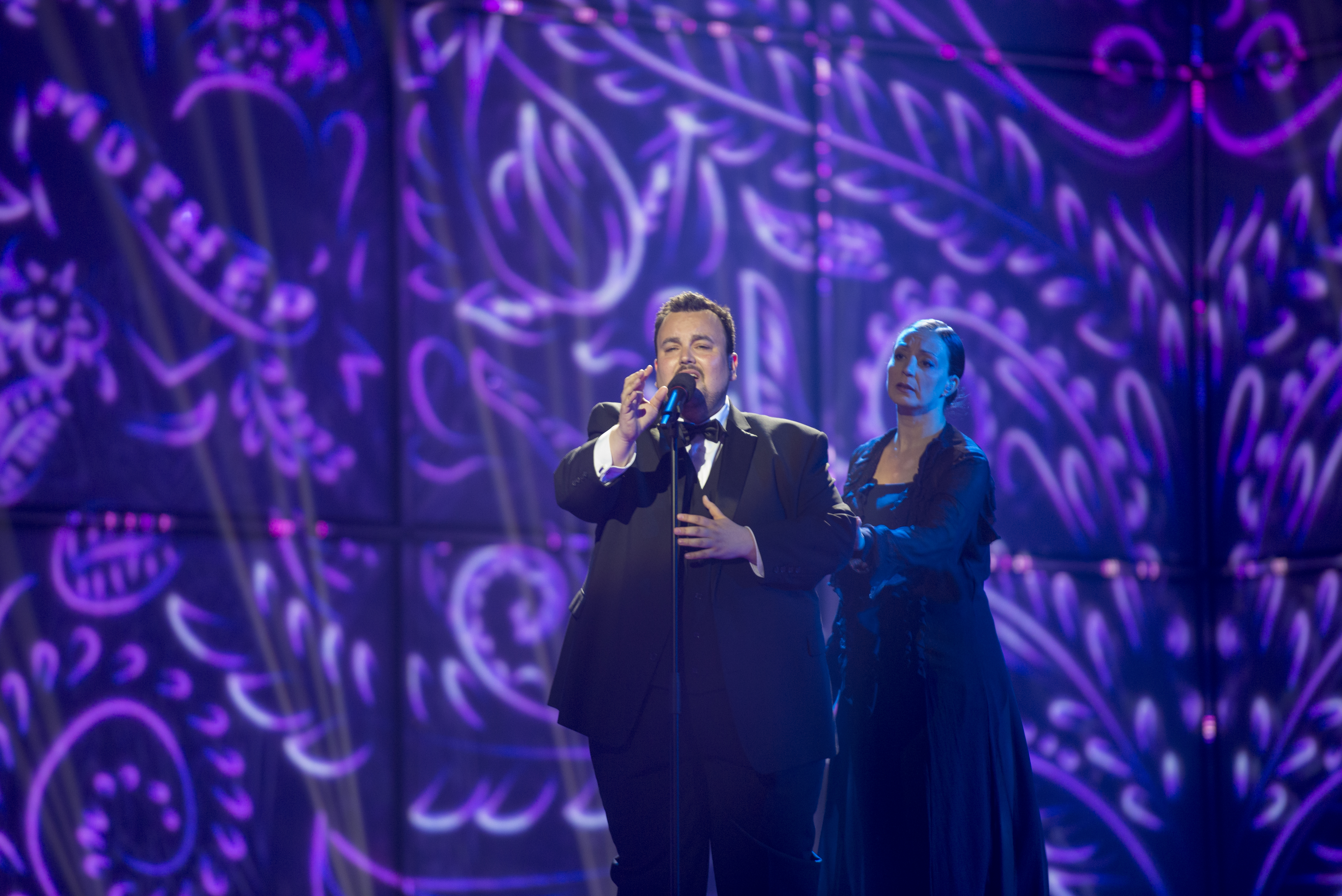
Axel Hirsoux during a rehearsal before the first semi-final

Axel Hirsoux took part in technical rehearsals on 29 April and 2 May, followed by dress rehearsals on 5 and 6 May. This included the jury show on 5 May where the professional juries of each country watched and voted on the competing entries.

The Belgian performance featured Axel Hirsoux dressed in a black suit and bow tie and joined by a female dancer in a long black dress who performed gentle choreography that symbolised the mother's love of a child. The stage colour was purple and the LED screens displayed flowery sketches. The performance also featured moving spotlights and the use of a wind machine. The dancer that joined Axel Hirsoux during the performance was Isabelle Beernaert, who also choreographed the Belgian performance.

At the end of the show, Belgium was not announced among the top 10 entries in the first semi-final and therefore failed to qualify to compete in the final. It was later revealed that Belgium placed fourteenth in the semi-final, receiving a total of 28 points.

=== Voting ===
Voting during the three shows consisted of 50 percent public televoting and 50 percent from a jury deliberation. The jury consisted of five music industry professionals who were citizens of the country they represent, with their names published before the contest to ensure transparency. This jury was asked to judge each contestant based on: vocal capacity; the stage performance; the song's composition and originality; and the overall impression by the act. In addition, no member of a national jury could be related in any way to any of the competing acts in such a way that they cannot vote impartially and independently. The individual rankings of each jury member were released shortly after the grand final.

Following the release of the full split voting by the EBU after the conclusion of the competition, it was revealed that Belgium had placed eleventh with both the public televote and fourteenth with the jury vote in the first semi-final. In the public vote, Belgium scored 41 points, while with the jury vote, Belgium scored 24 points.

Below is a breakdown of points awarded to Belgium and awarded by Belgium in the first semi-final and grand final of the contest, and the breakdown of the jury voting and televoting conducted during the two shows:

==== Points awarded to Belgium ====
Points awarded to Belgium (Semi-final 1)
Score	Country
12 points	
10 points	
8 points	
7 points	Moldova
6 points	Armenia
5 points	
4 points	Azerbaijan; Russia
3 points	Netherlands
2 points	Montenegro
1 point	France; San Marino

==== Points awarded by Belgium ====
Points awarded by Belgium (Semi-final 1)
Score	Country
12 points	Hungary
10 points	Netherlands
8 points	Sweden
7 points	Ukraine
6 points	Portugal
5 points	Latvia
4 points	Iceland
3 points	Armenia
2 points	Albania
1 point	Russia

Points awarded by Belgium (Final)
Score	Country
12 points	Austria
10 points	Sweden
8 points	Netherlands
7 points	Hungary
6 points	Denmark
5 points	Romania
4 points	Ukraine
3 points	Finland
2 points	Spain
1 point	United Kingdom

==== Detailed voting results ====
The following members comprised the Belgian jury:

- Bob Savenberg (jury chairperson) – musician, singer, producer, artist, manager, represented Belgium in the 1991 contest as part of Clouseau
- Laura van den Bruel (Iris) – singer, represented Belgium in the 2012 contest
- Roos Van Acker – radio DJ, television host, artist
- Yannic Fonderie – music producer, composer
- Wouter Vander Veken – music producer, composer, label manager

Detailed voting results from Belgium (Semi-final 1)
R/O	Country	B. Savenberg	Iris	R. Van Acker	Y. Fonderie	W. Van der Veken	Jury Rank	Televote Rank	Combined Rank	Points
01	Armenia	13	15	14	14	15	15	1	8	3
02	Latvia	5	14	11	9	5	9	6	6	5
03	Estonia	6	8	10	13	6	8	13	11	
04	Sweden	1	1	9	2	3	2	5	3	8
05	Iceland	15	12	2	3	1	5	10	7	4
06	Albania	4	9	8	5	14	7	9	9	2
07	Russia	8	5	12	4	9	6	12	10	1
08	Azerbaijan	11	6	13	10	8	11	14	14	
09	Ukraine	3	4	4	6	7	3	7	4	7
10	Belgium									
11	Moldova	14	11	7	7	12	12	15	15	
12	San Marino	10	13	6	15	13	14	8	12	
13	Portugal	12	7	5	11	10	10	4	5	6
14	Netherlands	9	2	3	8	2	4	2	2	10
15	Montenegro	7	10	15	12	11	13	11	13	
16	Hungary	2	3	1	1	4	1	3	1	12

Detailed voting results from Belgium (Final)
R/O	Country	B. Savenberg	Iris	R. Van Acker	Y. Fonderie	W. Van der Veken	Jury Rank	Televote Rank	Combined Rank	Points
01	Ukraine	1	11	7	5	6	5	13	7	4
02	Belarus	19	17	26	9	17	17	23	22	
03	Azerbaijan	18	16	22	11	8	16	26	24	
04	Iceland	26	12	6	6	5	11	16	13	
05	Norway	16	18	20	17	20	18	10	14	
06	Romania	8	7	17	18	16	13	5	6	5
07	Armenia	21	26	25	24	19	25	1	11	
08	Montenegro	20	19	18	15	22	19	24	25	
09	Poland	25	25	24	25	26	26	4	16	
10	Greece	24	20	15	22	25	23	7	17	
11	Austria	7	6	1	7	1	3	3	1	12
12	Germany	17	15	13	19	10	15	20	19	
13	Sweden	3	2	10	2	2	1	6	2	10
14	France	23	24	23	20	9	21	21	23	
15	Russia	9	14	14	12	15	12	15	12	
16	Italy	22	21	19	21	21	22	18	21	
17	Slovenia	14	13	12	10	18	14	25	20	
18	Finland	5	8	8	3	3	4	14	8	3
19	Spain	13	3	9	14	12	10	9	9	2
20	Switzerland	11	23	16	23	23	20	12	18	
21	Hungary	2	9	3	1	7	2	8	4	7
22	Malta	12	5	2	16	11	9	19	15	
23	Denmark	6	10	4	8	4	6	11	5	6
24	Netherlands	10	4	5	13	13	8	2	3	8
25	San Marino	15	22	21	26	24	24	22	26	
26	United Kingdom	4	1	11	4	14	7	17	10	1
