= Axel Hirsoux =

Belgian singer (born 1982)

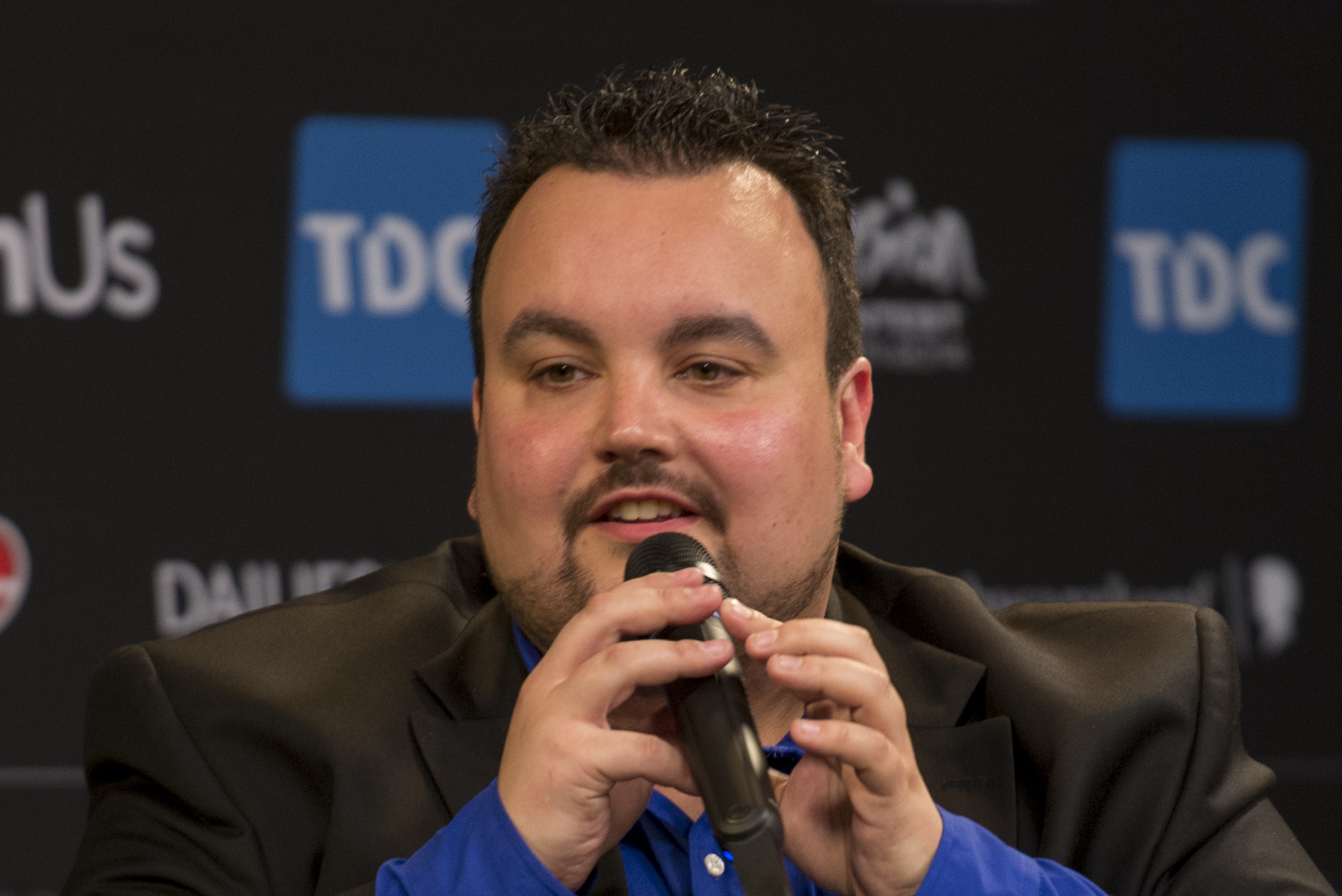
- Axel Hirsoux (2014)

Background information
- Born: Axel Hirsoux; 26 September 1982 (age 43); La Hestre, Manage, Belgium
- Genres: Pop, classical crossover
- Occupation: Singer
- Instrument: Vocals
- Years active: 2013–present

Axel Hirsoux (born 26 September 1982) is a Belgian singer. He represented Belgium in the Eurovision Song Contest 2014 in Copenhagen, Denmark with the song "Mother". In the final of the local pre-selection Eurosong, he received more than 50 percent of the televotes and 4 times the maximum of 12 points from the international jury.

== Career ==
=== 2013: The Voice Belgique ===
In 2013, he participated in Walloon TV-talent-contests: and 'The Voice Belgique' (being eliminated in the second round).

Axel Hirsoux presenting himself and the name of the song he is performing in the Eurovision Song Contest 2014. The clip is in English.

=== 2014–present: Eurovision Song Contest ===
In 2014 it was announced that Hirsoux would compete in Eurosong 2014, the Belgian national selection for the Eurovision Song Contest 2014 organised by the Belgian broadcaster Vlaamse Radio- en Televisieomroeporganisatie (VRT). He performed the song "Mother" during the first Casting Show, the song progressed to the Semi-final. On 9 March 2014 he performed during the third Semi-final, he progressed to the Final. The final of the competition took place on 16 March 2014 at the Sportpaleis in Antwerp. He was announced as the winner and would represent Belgium in the Eurovision Song Contest 2014 at the B&W Hallerne in Copenhagen, Denmark. During the semi-final allocation draw on 20 January 2014 at the Copenhagen City Hall, Belgium was drawn to compete in the second half of the first semi-final on 6 May 2014. The song failed to qualify from the first semi-final, placing 14th and scoring 28 points. After the contest on 7 July 2014 he released the single "Bellissimo". In November 2014 Hirsoux & Camille Beniest released the single "Because You Need Me". On 1 June 2015, he released the single "Haut l'humain".

== Personal life ==
While in Copenhagen for the Eurovision Song Contest, Hirsoux told OUTtv he is married to a man.

== Discography ==
=== Singles ===
Title	Year	Peak chart positions		Album
Title	Year	BEL (Vl)	BEL (Wa)	Album
"Mother"	2014	7	32	Non-album singles
"Bellissimo"	2014	49^{[A]}	—	Non-album singles
"Because You Need Me" (with Camille Beniest)	2014	83^{[A]}	—	Non-album singles
"Haut l'humain"	2015	—	—	Non-album singles
"Après l'hiver"	2015	—	—	Non-album singles
"Au plus près de mes rêves"	2016	—	—	Non-album singles
"—" denotes a single that did not chart or was not released.

Awards and achievements
Preceded by Roberto Bellarosa with "Love Kills"	Belgium in the Eurovision Song Contest; 2014	Succeeded by Loïc Nottet with "Rhythm Inside"
