= Fortiche =

French animation studio

Fortiche Production SAS
- Logo used since 2009
- Type: Private
- Industry: Animation
- Founded: June 3, 2009; 17 years ago
- Founders: Pascal Charrue; Jérôme Combe; Arnaud Delord
- Headquarters: Paris, France
- Number of locations: 3
- Products: Animated series; Music videos; Advertising
- Revenue: 16,261,500 euro (2020)
- Number of employees: 350 (2022)
- Website: forticheprod.com

Fortiche Production SAS is a French animation studio headquartered in Paris with a branch in Montpellier and Las Palmas (Spain). It features a team of up to 450 people across creation, direction, and production. The studio is now expanding into original IP development and major international productions.

Founded in 2009 in Paris, the studio is renowned for its signature 2D/3D hybrid aesthetic. The studio is best known for its long-standing collaboration with Riot Games, having produced the hit series Arcane and several cinematics and music videos for League of Legends since 2013. Fortiche also produced music videos for high-profile artists such as Stromae, Pomme, Coldplay and Gorillaz.

== Development ==
Fortiche Production SAS was founded in 2009 and initially created music videos and commercials. This work, rooted in Jerome's Combe's work with Stéphane Hamache and André Bessy built the trademark style: a combination of 2D and 3D animation has defined the studio's style, the "Touche Fortiche".

They moved on to creating music videos for Freak Kitchen, Gorillaz and LIMOUSINE. These projects caught the attention of Riot Games. Together, they produced their first League of Legends promotional video, Get Jinxed. The video was a hit with the MOBA community. For the latter, Fortiche produced game trailers in the form of short films along with music videos, most notably Pop/Stars.

Other works include the title sequence for the Rabbids Invasion animated series and the 55-minute historical documentary film Le dernier Gaulois about the Gallic Wars animated by Fortiche, aired in 2015 by the French channel France 2 broadcast. Motion capture technology was used for this.

At the 2017 industry fair Cartoon Movie in Bordeaux, the studio pitched the feature film project Miss Saturne with a pilot short film.

=== Arcane ===
In November 2021, Fortiche, in collaboration with Riot Games, released the series Arcane set in the League of Legends-universe on the streaming platforms Netflix and in China on Tencent Video. It was the world's most-watched series on Netflix for two weeks in November 2021 and was extremely well received by critics.

During the six year creation of Arcane, staff numbers grew from around 15 to around 300. The studio expanded in 2020 with branches in Montpellier and Las Palmas. The studio's revenue rose to €16.4 million for 2021. Le Figaro reported that the budget of Arcane was €60–80 million. In November 2021 Riot-Games-CEO Nicolo Laurent announced via Twitter that a second season was commissioned from Fortiche. The second and final season premiered on November 9, 2024 and concluded on November 23. In total, 700 people worked on the series at various points throughout its eight-year production cycle.

On March 14, 2022, Riot Games announced a new equity investment in Fortiche Production. Under the terms of the investment, Riot now holds a significant non-controlling stake in Fortiche. Brian Wright (Chief Content Officer at Riot) and Brendan Mulligan (Director of Corporate Development at Riot) have also joined Fortiche's board of directors.

=== Original productions ===
==== Penelope of Sparta ====
In 2023, Fortiche announced the development of its first original animated feature film, Penelope of Sparta. The film is described as a reimagining of The Odyssey set within a science-fiction and fantasy universe. The plot serves as a prequel to Homer’s epic poem, focusing on the teenage years of Penelope and Odysseus.

==== Miss Saturne (Mini-series) ====
At the 2025 Annecy International Animation Film Festival, Fortiche announced the development of the animated mini-series Miss Saturne, a collaboration with Arte Numérique and Les Storygraphes. Originally conceived as a feature film and presented at Cartoon Movie in 2017, the production has since been reformatted into ten ten-minute episodes. Adapted from the novel by Barbara Israël, the series is aimed at teenagers and young adults, featuring an aesthetic heavily influenced by 1980s New wave music. The story follows 16-year-old Mercy and her companion, Tom, as they flee their past aboard a night train departing from Nice. The series will explore themes of adolescence, grief, and identity formation.

== Filmography ==
=== Films ===
- Le dernier Gaulois (2015) – TV Movie
- Penelope of Sparta (in development)

=== Television series ===
- Rocket & Groot (2017)
- Arcane (2021–2024)
- Miss Saturne (in development)

=== Music videos ===
- "Hurts Like Heaven" - Coldplay (2012)
- "DoYaThing" - Gorillaz featuring James Murphy and Andre 3000 (2012)
- "La Gaviota" - Limousine (2012)
- "Get Jinxed" - Agnete Kjølsrud and Christian Linke (2013)
- "Warriors" - Imagine Dragons (2014)
- "Freak of the Week" - Freak Kitchen
- "Pop/Stars" - K/DA featuring Madison Beer, (G)I-DLE and Jaira Burns (2018)
- "Rise" - Mako featuring The Word Alive and The Glitch Mob (2018)
- "Enemy" - Imagine Dragons and J.I.D (2021)
- "Blood Sweat & Tears" - Sheryl Lee Ralph (2024)
- "Bite Marks" - TEYA (2025)
- "Ma Meilleure Ennemie" - Stromae, Pomme (2025)
- "Firestarter" - K/DA featuring Miyeon and Soyeon of I-dle, Sophie Powers, Mimi Webb (2026)

=== Video game cinematics ===
- "A Dark Gambit" (2025) - Cinematic launching the 2025 League of Legends competitive season
- "Beginning of the End" (2025) - Mid-season cinematic for League of Legends
- "Twilight's End" (2025) - Concluding cinematic for the 2025 League of Legends competitive season

== Exhibitions ==
=== 2023: "Eternal Mucha" exhibition at the Grand Palais Immersif ===
From March 22 to November 5, 2023, Fortiche participated in the "Eternal Mucha" exhibition at the Grand Palais Immersif in Paris. The studio presented pre-production assets from the Arcane series to illustrate the profound influence of Alphonse Mucha’s Art Nouveau style on the show's art direction.

=== 2025: First exhibition dedicated to Arcane in Montpellier ===
The first-ever exhibition solely dedicated to the creation of Arcane was held from January 27 to February 21, 2025, at Montpellier City Hall. Organized in collaboration with Riot Games and the City of Montpellier, this event allowed visitors to explore the series through original artwork, storyboards, and final renders, illustrating the entire visual development pipeline.

=== 2025: Annecy Festival exhibition ===
As part of the 2025 Annecy International Animation Film Festival, Fortiche and Riot Games, in partnership with CITIA and the City of Annecy, presented an exhibition from June 8 to 14 at the UBA Pâquier site. The showcase featured original concepts, visual development art, set designs, and audiovisual content retracing every stage of the production process.

== Main awards ==
Award	Year	Production	Number of awards	Detail
Primetime Emmy Awards	2025	Arcane, season 2	3	Outstanding Animated Program; Outstanding Individual Achievement in Animation: Colorscript and color keys artist (Faustine Dumontier); Outstanding Individual Achievement in Animation: Background designer (Bruno Couchinho)
Primetime Emmy Awards	2022	Arcane, season 1	4	Outstanding Animated Program; Outstanding Individual Achievement in Animation: Art direction (Anne-Laure To); Outstanding Individual Achievement in Animation: Art direction (Julien Georgel); Outstanding Individual Achievement in Animation: Background designer (Bruno Couchinho)
Annie Awards	2025	Arcane, season 2	6	Outstanding Achievement for Directing in an Animated Television/Broadcast Production (Pascal Charrue, Arnaud Delord, Barthélémy Maunoury); Outstanding Achievement for Editorial in an Animated Television/Broadcast Production (Nazim Meslem, Gilad Carmel, Roberto Fernandez); Outstanding Achievement for Character Animation in an Animated Television/Broadcast Production (Tom Gouill); Outstanding Achievement for Production Design in an Animated Television/Broadcast Production (Arnaud-Loris Baudry, Julien Georgel, Faustine Dumontier, Charlotte O’Neill); Outstanding Achievement for Storyboarding in an Animated Television/Broadcast Production (Joséphine Meis); Outstanding Achievement for Animated Effects in an Animated Television/Broadcast Production (Guillaume Degroote, Aurélien Ressencourt, Adam Bachiri, Guillaume Zaouche, Jérôme Dupré)
Annie Awards	2022	Arcane, season 1	7	Outstanding Achievement for Production Design in an Animated Television/Broadcast Production (Julien Georgel, Aymeric Kevin, Arnaud Baudry); Outstanding Achievement for Animated Effects in an Animated Television/Broadcast Production (Guillaume Degroote, Aurélien Ressencourt, Martin Touzé, Frédéric Macé, Jérôme Dupré); Outstanding Achievement for Character Animation in an Animated Television/Broadcast Production (Léa Chervet); Outstanding Achievement for Character Design in an Animated Television/Broadcast Production (Evan Monteiro); Outstanding Achievement for Directing in an Animated Television/Broadcast Production (Pascal Charrue, Arnaud Delord, Barthélémy Maunoury); Outstanding Achievement for Production Design in an Animated Television/Broadcast Production (Julien Georgel, Aymeric Kevin, Arnaud Baudry); Outstanding Achievement for Storyboarding in an Animated Television/Broadcast Production (Joséphine Meis)
