= Arcane League of Legends =

Arcane League of Legends (Soundtrack from the Animated Series)

Soundtrack album by Arcane & League of Legends Music
- Released: November 21, 2021
- Genre: Soundtrack
- Length: 36:57
- Label: Riot Games; Virgin; UMG

Arcane & League of Legends Music chronology
Arcane League of Legends (Soundtrack from the Animated Series) (2021)	Arcane League of Legends: Season 2 (Soundtrack from the Animated Series) (2024)

Singles from Arcane League of Legends (Soundtrack from the Animated Series)
- 1. "Enemy" Released: October 28, 2021

Arcane League of Legends (Soundtrack from the Animated Series) is the soundtrack to the first season of the 2021 animated television series Arcane, set in Riot Games' League of Legends fictional universe. The soundtrack features 11 songs released on November 21, 2021, through Riot Games' music division. It is preceded by the Imagine Dragons and JID song "Enemy", released as the lead single from the album on October 28, and accompanied with a music video. The song, which also served as the series' theme music, charted in numerous countries.

At the 2022 Billboard Music Awards, the album received a nomination for Top Soundtrack, which it lost to Encanto.

== Original soundtrack ==
=== Track listing ===
Arcane: League of Legends, Original Soundtrack
No.	Title	Writer(s)	Artist(s)	Length
1.	"Playground"	Mako, Sebastien Najand	Bea Miller	3:50
2.	"Our Love"	Curtis Harding, Sam Cohen	Curtis Harding, Jazmine Sullivan	3:38
3.	"Goodbye"	Mako	Ramsey	3:51
4.	"Dirty Little Animals"	BONES UK, Sebastien Najand	BONES UK	3:25
5.	"Enemy"	Imagine Dragons & JID	Imagine Dragons & JID	2:53
6.	"Guns for Hire"	Mako	Woodkid	3:46
7.	"Misfit Toys"	Pusha T; Mako	Pusha T & Mako	3:09
8.	"Dynasties and Dystopia"	Denzel Curry; Gizzle; Bren Joy	Denzel Curry, Gizzle, Bren Joy	2:58
9.	"Snakes"	Pvris; Miyavi	Pvris, Miyavi	2:41
10.	"When Everything Went Wrong"	Fantastic Negrito	Fantastic Negrito	3:13
11.	"What Could Have Been"	Mako	Sting, Ray Chen	3:33
Total length:				36:57

=== Reception ===
Writing for the music database AllMusic, Neil Z. Yeung summarised, "The Arcane: League of Legends soundtrack is quite the immersive listen, notable for its scope, inclusivity, and keen ear for interesting artistic choices."

=== Charts ===
==== Weekly charts ====
Chart (2021–2024)	Peak position
Belgian Albums (Ultratop Wallonia)	165
Finnish Albums (Suomen virallinen lista)	7
New Zealand Albums (RMNZ)	37
Norwegian Albums (VG-lista)	9
UK Album Downloads (OCC)	37
UK Soundtrack Albums (OCC)	1
US Billboard 200	94
US Soundtrack Albums (Billboard)	3

==== Year-end charts ====
Chart (2022)	Position
US Soundtrack Albums (Billboard)	24

== Original score ==
The original score for the first season was released in three acts, covering three episodes and debuted the day after its premiere. Act 1 was released on November 7, 2021, followed by Act 2 and 3 on November 14 and 21, respectively.

Arcane: League of Legends (Act 1) [Original Score]
No.	Title	Length
1.	"The Bridge"	1:42
2.	"The City of Progress"	1:19
3.	"Intruders"	0:39
4.	"The Getaway"	1:21
5.	"Just a Taste"	2:06
6.	"You're Stronger Than You Think"	1:29
7.	"Someone Just Volunteered"	3:00
8.	"The Flashback"	2:19
9.	"Some Mysteries Are Better Left Unsolved"	1:47
10.	"Escape From the Arcade"	1:06
11.	"The Grand Council Chamber"	1:08
12.	"The Trial"	1:26
13.	"There's a Monster Inside All of Us"	1:43
14.	"You Can't Escape the Past"	3:36
15.	"It's Viktor"	1:12
16.	"A Story of Opposites"	1:47
17.	"Stubborn to the End"	2:46
18.	"Deal's Changed"	1:14
19.	"Our Hextech Dream"	1:11
20.	"Give Us a Chance"	1:07
21.	"I Can Help Them"	0:57
22.	"A Short Reunion"	2:04
23.	"Rise to the Surface"	1:44
24.	"Open Up!"	0:47
25.	"The Era of Hextech"	1:06
26.	"You Have to Work!"	1:20
27.	"The Explosion"	1:22
28.	"Revenge"	3:11
29.	"You're a Jinx"	4:25
Total length:		50:54

Arcane: League of Legends (Act 2) [Original Score]
No.	Title	Length
1.	"A Bicentennial"	2:35
2.	"The Firelights"	1:37
3.	"She's Here"	2:10
4.	"The Next Chapter of Hextech"	1:44
5.	"Our Future Is Bright"	0:51
6.	"Fire"	0:55
7.	"Stillwater Prison"	0:36
8.	"The Assailant"	0:56
9.	"Field Shooting"	0:55
10.	"Order for Release"	2:40
11.	"Headache"	0:40
12.	"Too Risky"	1:04
13.	"Welcome to the Lanes"	0:56
14.	"They Think, They Adapt"	0:51
15.	"Rematch"	0:36
16.	"The Concerto"	2:25
17.	"Romance"	2:51
18.	"Traitor"	3:51
19.	"She's Back"	1:10
20.	"The Toy Boat"	1:23
21.	"You've Got a Good Heart"	2:08
22.	"I'm Calling It the Hexcore"	1:39
23.	"The Apothecary"	1:51
24.	"A Well-Deserved Retirement"	2:27
25.	"How Could I Forget?"	1:37
26.	"I Understand Now"	1:02
27.	"I'm Right Here"	1:18
28.	"Showdown"	3:44
Total length:		46:32

Arcane: League of Legends (Act 3) [Original Score]
No.	Title	Length
1.	"I Missed You"	1:34
2.	"A Delicate Art"	0:44
3.	"We'll Get Through This"	0:48
4.	"The Price of Our Freedom"	2:13
5.	"Don't Forget Again"	1:57
6.	"Everyone Else Betrays Us"	1:32
7.	"This City Needs Healing"	2:01
8.	"We Call Them Firelights"	1:25
9.	"Viktor and the Hexcore"	1:14
10.	"Ambush"	3:23
11.	"Boy Savior"	2:07
12.	"Old Friend"	1:02
13.	"A Wolf Has No Mercy"	2:44
14.	"All For Nothing"	1:28
15.	"Mother and Daughter"	1:11
16.	"It's Just Heimerdinger Now"	2:34
17.	"A Diplomatic Solution"	2:22
18.	"Oil and Water"	1:07
19.	"First Steps"	0:50
20.	"Something I've Been Working On"	1:57
21.	"We Got a Deal, Pretty Boy?"	1:59
22.	"The Raid"	1:17
23.	"Fallout"	2:21
24.	"You Won't Make It Alone"	2:15
25.	"Everyone's Gotta Do Their Part"	1:33
26.	"Promise Me"	1:46
27.	"Oasis"	0:58
28.	"Is There Anything So Endearing as a Daughter?"	0:58
29.	"She Still Needs You"	2:11
30.	"One Final Proposal"	1:27
31.	"Where Should I Sit?"	3:51
32.	"Remember Who You Are"	1:54
33.	"You're Perfect"	1:18
Total length:		58:01
