= Enemy (Imagine Dragons and JID song) =

2021 song by Imagine Dragons and JID

Single by Imagine Dragons and JID

from the album Arcane (Soundtrack from the Animated Series) and Mercury – Acts 1 & 2
- Released: October 28, 2021
- Length: 2:53
- Label: Interscope; Kidinakorner
- Songwriters: Justin Tranter; Ben McKee; Dan Reynolds; Daniel Platzman; Mattias Larsson; Robin Fredriksson; Wayne Sermon; Destin Route
- Producer: Mattman & Robin

Imagine Dragons singles chronology
"Monday" (2021)	"Enemy" (2021)	"Bones" (2022)

JID singles chronology
"Garden Party" (2021)	"Enemy" (2021)	"Surround Sound" (2022)

Music video
- "Enemy" on YouTube

"Enemy" is a song by American pop rock band Imagine Dragons and American rapper JID. It was released through Interscope Records and Kidinakorner on October 28, 2021, as the lead single of the soundtrack to the Netflix animated series Arcane, to which it also serves as the opening theme. The song was written by the artists alongside Justin Tranter and the producers Mattman & Robin. The song was also included on the band's fifth studio album Mercury – Act 1 (2021) and its reissue, Mercury – Acts 1 & 2 (2022). The song became JID's first song to reach the top 5 in the US, and became the band's first song to reach the top 5 since the 2017 song "Thunder". In 2023, for the 35th anniversary of Alternative Airplay – where "Enemy" charted for 54 weeks, of which 9 were spent at the top spot – Billboard ranked the song as the 14th-most successful in the chart's history.

== Background ==
"Enemy" was recorded for the Netflix animated series Arcane, which premiered on November 6, 2021. The inspiration behind the song was the video game League of Legends, with the band having previously recorded the song "Warriors" for the 2014 League of Legends World Championship. On Instagram, JID said "I wrote this verse a couple years ago but initially the opening lines were from a song I started with Mac [Miller], he told me it would fit better on this song and I’m glad he did."

The opening title version, featuring a more orchestrated instrumental and slightly extended length, was released on November 23, 2024. It serves as the closing track of the album Arcane League of Legends: Season 2 (Soundtrack from the Animated Series).

== Content ==
In a press release, the band's vocalist Dan Reynolds explained: "'Enemy' is about reconciling internal conflict in a world where it feels impossible to trust even yourself. In Arcane, two sisters' lives take them on different paths and leads to a division that threatens to tear an entire city apart. Like the series, the song is meant to be both personal and a critique of a society that seems intent on creating division."

== Music video ==
An accompanying animated video was released alongside the song, and produced by Riot Games and Fortiche Production. It features the League of Legends character Jinx in a story about "the parts of her childhood that led her to a life of crime" and several scenes of "the falling out between Jinx and her sister Vi".

== Personnel ==
Credits adapted from Tidal.

- Mattman & Robin – producer, composer, lyricist, associated performer, background vocalist, bass, brass band, drums, guitar, programming, synthesizer
- Justin Tranter – composer, lyricist, associated performer, background vocalist
- Imagine Dragons – composer, lyricist, engineer, studio personnel
- John Hanes – additional engineer, mix engineer, studio personnel
- JID – associated performer, vocals
- Dan Reynolds – associated performer, background vocals
- Ben Sedano – engineer, studio personnel
- Serban Ghenea – engineer, mixer, studio personnel
- Randy Merrill – mastering engineer, studio personnel

== Charts ==
=== Weekly charts ===
Weekly chart performance for "Enemy"
Chart (2021–2025)	Peak position
Argentina Hot 100 (Billboard)	68
Australia (ARIA)	15
Austria (Ö3 Austria Top 40)	3
Belgium (Ultratop 50 Flanders)	17
Belgium (Ultratop 50 Wallonia)	4
Bolivia (Billboard)	17
Brazil (Top 100 Brasil)	100
Canada Hot 100 (Billboard)	5
Canada CHR/Top 40 (Billboard)	2
Canada Hot AC (Billboard)	3
Canada Rock (Billboard)	29
CIS Airplay (TopHit)	73
Costa Rica (FONOTICA)	19
Czech Republic Airplay (ČNS IFPI)	87
Czech Republic Singles Digital (ČNS IFPI)	3
Denmark (Tracklisten)	21
Estonia Airplay (TopHit)	148
Finland (Suomen virallinen lista)	9
France (SNEP)	6
Germany (GfK)	4
Global 200 (Billboard)	3
Greece International (IFPI)	3
Hungary (Rádiós Top 40)	1
Hungary (Single Top 40)	7
Hungary (Stream Top 40)	1
Iceland (Tónlistinn)	5
India International (IMI)	5
Ireland (IRMA)	12
Italy (FIMI)	25
Lebanon (Lebanese Top 20)	20
Lithuania (AGATA)	4
Luxembourg (Billboard)	3
Malaysia (RIM)	19
Netherlands (Dutch Top 40)	5
Netherlands (Single Top 100)	6
New Zealand (Recorded Music NZ)	6
Norway (VG-lista)	5
Paraguay Streaming (SGP)	76
Peru (UNIMPRO)	23
Philippines (Billboard)	24
Poland Airplay (ZPAV)	1
Portugal (AFP)	2
Romania (Billboard)	23
Russia (Billboard)	7
San Marino Airplay (SMRTV Top 50)	15
Singapore (RIAS)	8
Slovakia Airplay (ČNS IFPI)	1
Slovakia Singles Digital (ČNS IFPI)	1
South Africa Streaming (TOSAC)	34
Spain (PROMUSICAE)	45
Suriname (Nationale Top 40)	6
Sweden (Sverigetopplistan)	12
Switzerland (Schweizer Hitparade)	6
Turkey (Billboard)	24
Ukraine Airplay (TopHit)	93
UK Singles (Official Charts)	17
US Billboard Hot 100	5
US Adult Contemporary (Billboard)	14
US Adult Pop Airplay (Billboard)	1
US Hot Rock & Alternative Songs (Billboard)	2
US Pop Airplay (Billboard)	1
US Rock & Alternative Airplay (Billboard)	2
Vietnam (Vietnam Hot 100)	44

Weekly chart performance
Chart (2026)	Peak position
Ukraine Airplay (TopHit)	61

=== Monthly charts ===
2022 monthly chart performance for "Enemy"
Chart (2022)	Peak position
CIS Airplay (TopHit)	74

2026 monthly chart performance for "Enemy"
Chart (2026)	Peak position
Ukraine Airplay (TopHit)	71

=== Year-end charts ===
2021 year-end chart performance for "Enemy"
Chart (2021)	Position
Hungary (Single Top 40)	65
Hungary (Stream Top 40)	38

2022 year-end chart performance for "Enemy"
Chart (2022)	Position
Australia (ARIA)	22
Austria (Ö3 Austria Top 40)	12
Belgium (Ultratop Flanders)	56
Belgium (Ultratop Wallonia)	10
Brazil (Pro-Música Brasil)	115
Canada (Canadian Hot 100)	12
CIS Airplay (TopHit)	177
Denmark (Tracklisten)	46
France (SNEP)	27
Germany (Official German Charts)	18
Global 200 (Billboard)	9
Hungary (Rádiós Top 40)	16
Hungary (Single Top 40)	41
Hungary (Stream Top 40)	10
Italy (FIMI)	78
Lithuania (AGATA)	14
Netherlands (Dutch Top 40)	34
Netherlands (Single Top 100)	44
New Zealand (Recorded Music NZ)	16
Poland (ZPAV)	25
Sweden (Sverigetopplistan)	45
Switzerland (Schweizer Hitparade)	13
UK Singles (OCC)	60
US Billboard Hot 100	15
US Adult Contemporary (Billboard)	39
US Adult Top 40 (Billboard)	12
US Hot Rock & Alternative Songs (Billboard)	3
US Mainstream Top 40 (Billboard)	20
US Rock Airplay (Billboard)	2

2023 year-end chart performance for "Enemy"
Chart (2023)	Position
Global 200 (Billboard)	164

== Certifications ==
Certifications for "Enemy"
Region	Certification	Certified units/sales
Australia (ARIA)	2× Platinum	140,000^{‡}
Austria (IFPI Austria)	Platinum	30,000^{‡}
Belgium (BRMA)	Platinum	40,000^{‡}
Brazil (Pro-Música Brasil)	3× Diamond	480,000^{‡}
Canada (Music Canada)	5× Platinum	400,000^{‡}
Denmark (IFPI Danmark)	Platinum	90,000^{‡}
France (SNEP)	Diamond	333,333^{‡}
Germany (BVMI)	Platinum	400,000^{‡}
India (IMI)	7× Platinum	840,000
Italy (FIMI)	2× Platinum	200,000^{‡}
Mexico (AMPROFON)	3× Diamond+Platinum+Gold	2,310,000^{‡}
New Zealand (RMNZ)	3× Platinum	90,000^{‡}
Poland (ZPAV)	Diamond	250,000^{‡}
Portugal (AFP)	3× Platinum	30,000^{‡}
Spain (Promusicae)	3× Platinum	180,000^{‡}
United Kingdom (BPI)	Platinum	600,000^{‡}
United States (RIAA)	4× Platinum	4,000,000^{‡}
Streaming
Central America (CFC)	3× Platinum	21,000,000^{†}
Chile (Profovi)	Gold	16,350,983
Greece (IFPI Greece)	Platinum	2,000,000^{†}
^{‡} Sales+streaming figures based on certification alone.^{†} Streaming-only figures based on certification alone.

== Release history ==
Release history for "Enemy"
Region	Date	Format	Label	Ref.
Various	October 28, 2021	Digital download; streaming	Interscope; Kidinakorner	
United States	December 7, 2021	Alternative radio	Interscope	
Italy	December 10, 2021	Contemporary hit radio	Universal	
United States	February 1, 2022	Contemporary hit radio	Interscope	

== See also ==
- List of best-selling singles in Mexico
