= Jinx (League of Legends) =

Video game character

- Jinx from League of Legends
- First game: League of Legends
- Created by: Katie De Sousa (concept); Graham McNeill (character)
- Designed by: Katie De Sousa; August Browning
- Voiced by: Various: Sarah Anne Williams (League of Legends) Mia Sinclair Jenness (Arcane; child) Ella Purnell (Arcane; adult)

In-universe information
- Alias: Powder (birth name)
- Home: Zaun (formerly the undercity of Piltover)

Jinx is a character in Riot Games' League of Legends media franchise. She was introduced as a playable champion in the October 2013 update for the 2009 video game of the same name, which was complemented by the animated music video "Get Jinxed" to commemorate her official debut. In the game's fictional universe, Jinx is a manic and impulsive criminal from Zaun who serves as the archenemy of her sister Vi. The Netflix animated series Arcane explores the character's origin story as Powder who, following a series of personal tragedies, is taken in and raised by the crime lord Silco. Ella Purnell voices the character in Arcane.

Jinx has become one of the franchise's most popular and iconic characters since her introduction. Her portrayal in Arcane and Purnell's vocal performance garnered critical acclaim.

== Concept and creation ==
Illustrator Katie De Sousa posted conceptual artwork of the "gun-toting, braid-rocking criminal" that would ultimately become Jinx on a bulletin board for potential ideas at Riot Games. De Sousa wanted to create a "completely insane female villain who is beyond any kind of reform or rehabilitation" for League of Legends. De Sousa was also a fan of "Attack Damage Carry" (ADC), a term used to describe champions that deal high levels of continuous damage in matches. The character was given the codename "Psycho Arsenal" and remained on the board for months until August Browning, seeking to make a weapon-swapping ADC, decided to develop her with De Sousa, while her backstory was written by Graham McNeill. They avoided giving her a "sexy persona" and instead depicted her as a pale and slender woman who wielded disproportionately oversized weapons to make her stand out from other female League champions. The Joker, Gollum, and actress Helena Bonham Carter served as primary inspirations for Jinx's character. Harley Quinn also was an inspiration for the character.

To commemorate Jinx's in-game debut, an animated music video starring the character titled "Get Jinxed" was released on the League of Legends YouTube channel. Jinx would officially join League of Legends in the October 2013 update, voiced by Sarah Anne Williams. Jinx's origin was later expanded upon when she was adapted by Christian Linke and Alex Yee for the animated streaming series Arcane. The first season was released on Netflix in November 2021. Ella Purnell voices Jinx in the series, while Mia Sinclair Jenness voices a younger version of the character in Act 1.

== Appearances ==
=== League of Legends ===
Jinx was added as a playable champion to the marksman roster of League of Legends in October 2013. As established in the lore written by Graham McNeill, Jinx was once a young innocent girl from Zaun, the seedy underbelly of the utopian city of Piltover. She harbors a dark and mysterious past with Vi, another champion from the game. Following a childhood tragedy, Jinx grew up to become "manic and impulsive" and her capacity for creating mayhem "became the stuff of legend". Her most notorious crimes include releasing a stampede of exotic animals, disrupting trade by lining the city's bridges with destructive explosives, and pulling a heist on one of Piltover's most secure treasuries. The game's developers ensured the character moved quickly during gameplay to portray her chaotic personality and energy.

Jinx's primary weapons include her minigun nicknamed "Pow-Pow"; her shock pistol "Zapper"; her explosive grenades called "Flame Chompers"; and her customized rocket launcher dubbed "Fishbones" for its shark-inspired design.

Jinx's alternate character skins in the game originate from parallel realities separate from the main lore. In the "Odyssey" universe, Jinx is a member of an intergalactic crew that travels the cosmos. In the "Star Guardian" universe, she is part of a magical girl squad. Jinx's design from Arcane was also adapted as an alternate skin in League of Legends.

=== Arcane ===
Jinx as depicted in Arcane

Arcane reveals that Jinx was originally named Powder. She and her older sister Vi were orphaned following the repressed undercity's failed uprising against the utopian city of Piltover, after which they were taken in by Vander, the leader of the rebellion.

At the start of the first season, Powder and Vi steal a set of arcane crystals from Jayce Talis, and Powder accidentally causes an explosion. The sisters escape, but the enforcers of Piltover pursue them to the undercity. Vander turns himself in to protect them only to be taken by Silco, his former brother-in-arms. Powder attempts to help Vi and her foster brothers, Mylo and Claggor, rescue Vander and uses the stolen crystals to cause a massive explosion that results in the deaths of Vander, Mylo, and Claggor. In her grief, Vi calls Powder a "jinx" and leaves, causing Powder to seek comfort in Silco's arms.

Years later, a teenage Powder goes by the name Jinx, having been raised by Silco, who has taken control of the undercity and renamed it Zaun. Jinx steals an arcane "Hextech" gemstone from Jayce for Silco, killing six enforcers in the process and prompting rookie enforcer Caitlyn Kiramman to recruit Vi, who has been imprisoned for years, to help track Jinx down. Jinx turns on Vi upon realizing that she is working with Caitlyn, and is grievously wounded during an encounter with Ekko, her former childhood friend and the leader of insurgents known as the Firelights. Silco brings Jinx to Singed, who injects her with the chemical stimulant "Shimmer" to heal her injuries. Jinx hallucinates Vi and Caitlyn inflicting her pain so she kidnaps them both. She abducts Silco as well upon overhearing him lament choosing between Zaun's independence and her as part of an ultimatum offered to him by Jayce. Jinx forces Vi to choose between Caitlyn and herself. Both Vi and Silco appeal to Jinx, causing her to suffer a panic attack. Silco breaks free and almost shoots Vi before Jinx, in a psychotic fit, guns him down. In his final moments, Silco reaffirms he never would have betrayed Jinx and comforts her by telling her that she is "perfect". Jinx, having weaponized the gemstone to power a rocket launcher, fires at the Piltover council just as they approve to grant Zaun its independence.

In the second season, Jinx befriends a young orphan named Isha and works with Sevika, Silco's former lieutenant, to return collected smog known as "The Gray" back into Piltover via the ventilation system, although Jinx loses one of her fingers to Caitlyn in the process. Piltover declares martial law and Jinx, having become a revolutionary symbol in Zaun, refuses Sevika's urgings to lead a revolt until Isha is captured by the enforcers. After freeing Isha and the other arrested Zaunites, Jinx is attacked by a human-wolf hybrid creature, whom she discovers is a revived Vander. Jinx and Vi work together to track Vander down and bring him to Viktor, a "herald" who promises to restore Vander's humanity, but Viktor's commune is besieged by Noxian general Ambessa Medarda, and Isha sacrifices herself to save Jinx from Vander. Sent into depression by Isha's death, Jinx surrenders to Caitlyn and is imprisoned in a dungeon, where she hallucinates Silco advising her to walk away to break the cycle of violence. Jinx attempts suicide after being freed by Vi but is dissuaded by Ekko, and the two unite all of Zaun for a final confrontation against Viktor and the Noxian army in Piltover. Jinx seemingly sacrifices herself to save Vi and kill Vander, although Caitlyn later discovers evidence hinting at Jinx's survival.

=== Music videos ===
Jinx was one of the first champions from League of Legends to star in her own animated music video in the lead-up to her in-game debut. "Get Jinxed" by Agnete Kjølsrud from the band Djerv, which follows Jinx's destructive exploits in Piltover, was released on YouTube on October 8, 2013.

Jinx appears as the central character of the music video for Arcane's theme song, "Enemy" by Imagine Dragons and JID, which depicts "the parts of [Jinx's] childhood that led her to a life of crime". The video was released on YouTube on October 28, 2021, to promote the series. In March 2025, Jinx made another music video appearance for Stromae and Pomme's "Ma meilleure ennemie", which according to Billboard, "builds on the notable dance sequence between fan-favorite characters Powder and Ekko that occurs in the seventh episode of the second season. That experience significantly impacts Ekko later in the season, spurring him to help Jinx and further explore their connection".

=== Other appearances ===
Jinx has also featured in various League of Legends spin-off games, including Teamfight Tactics, Legends of Runeterra, and League of Legends: Wild Rift. As promotion for Arcane, Jinx was added as a playable character in PUBG Mobile, Fortnite, and Among Us. She appears as a coach in the video game Just Dance 2023 Edition for the song "Playground" by Bea Miller, portrayed by Céline Baron.

== Reception ==
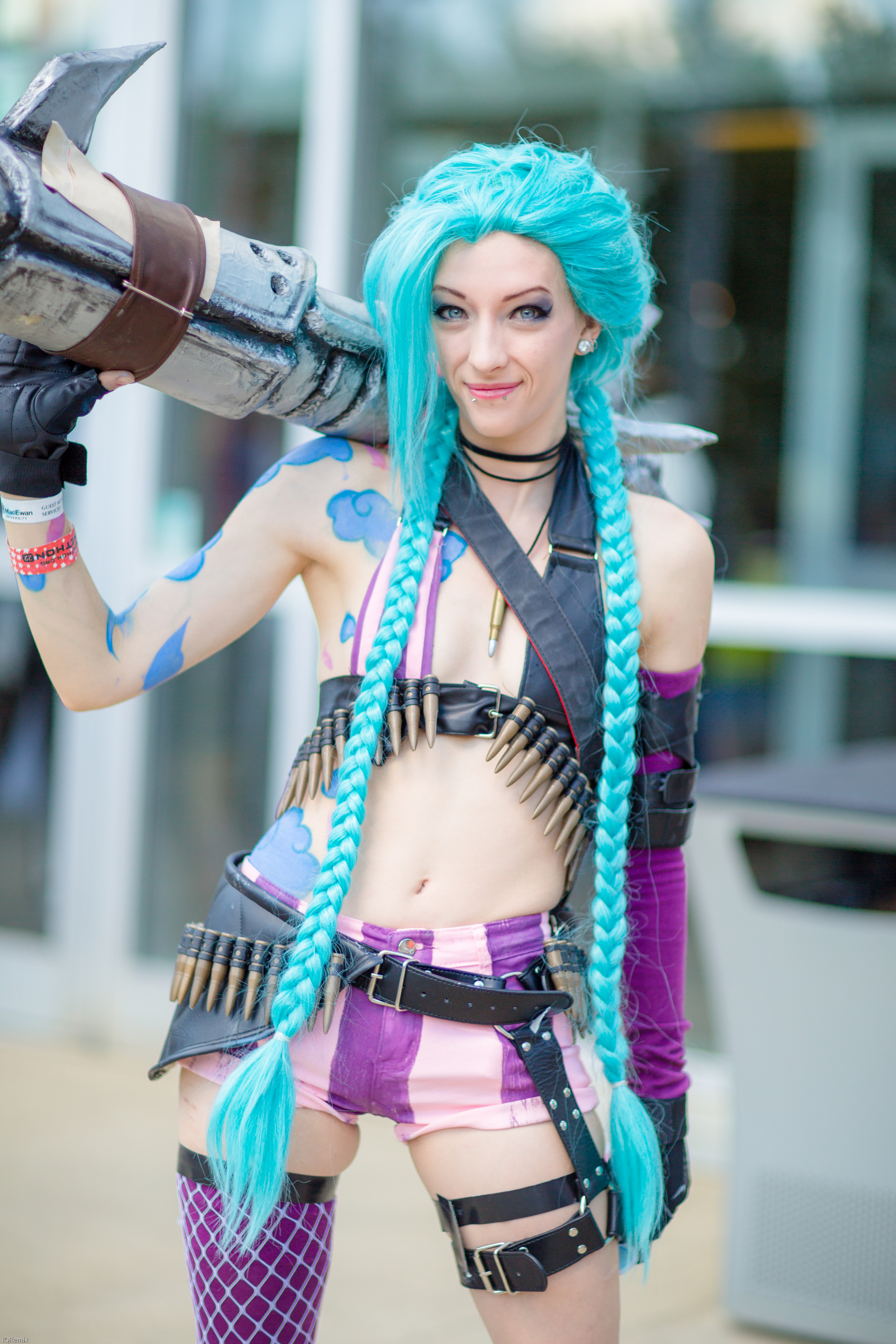
Jinx has been the frequent subject of cosplay.

Jinx is often labeled as a "fan-favorite" and one of the most iconic champions from League of Legends, and has become one of the most popular video game characters for fanart and cosplay. Dot Esports attributes Jinx's continued popularity towards the "Get Jinxed" music video and her "magnetic" design. PC Gamer listed Jinx as the 23rd most iconic character in PC gaming, citing her as the mascot for League of Legends. Jinx has been featured in multiple videos for Riot Games' League of Legends YouTube channel, and was even the focal point of the cinematic launch trailer for the mobile game League of Legends: Wild Rift.

Jinx's portrayal in Arcane garnered widespread acclaim from critics and fans. Rafael Motamayor of IGN described the character as "compelling" and "what keep[s] you engaged episode after episode". Fans have lauded the series' serious treatment of Jinx's mental illness to make her a more tragic character, rather than using it as a quirk for comedy. Similarities have been noted between Jinx's characterization in Arcane and the DC Comics supervillain the Joker (who served as an inspiration for Jinx), specifically with regards to her actions in the season finale.

Reception for the character remained positive in Arcane's second season, with praise for her character development and emotional growth. In particular, the romance between Ekko and Powder in the alternate timeline depicted in "Pretend Like It's the First Time" received praise and analysis from critics, with Isaiah Colbert from Gizmodo favorably comparing Ekko and Powder's dynamic to the romance between Max and Chloe from Life Is Strange. Elijah Gonzalez from Paste found the relationship between Ekko and Powder "crushing" and "bittersweet," while Motamayor for IGN praised the relationship for conveying themes of "regret, choices, new beginnings, and what could have been."

The dance sequence between Powder and Ekko has been thoroughly evaluated, with many praising the music and animation. Fans have speculated that the four-frames-per-second rendering for the dance scene is a reference to Ekko's ability to travel four seconds into the past. The song that plays during the sequence, "Ma meilleure ennemie" by Stromae and Pomme, became the most-streamed French-language track in 24 hours on Spotify.

Ella Purnell won the Annie Award for Outstanding Achievement for Voice Acting in an Animated Television / Broadcast Production for her performance in the sixth episode of Arcane's first season, "When These Walls Come Tumbling Down".
