= Mia Sinclair Jenness =

American actress (born 2005)

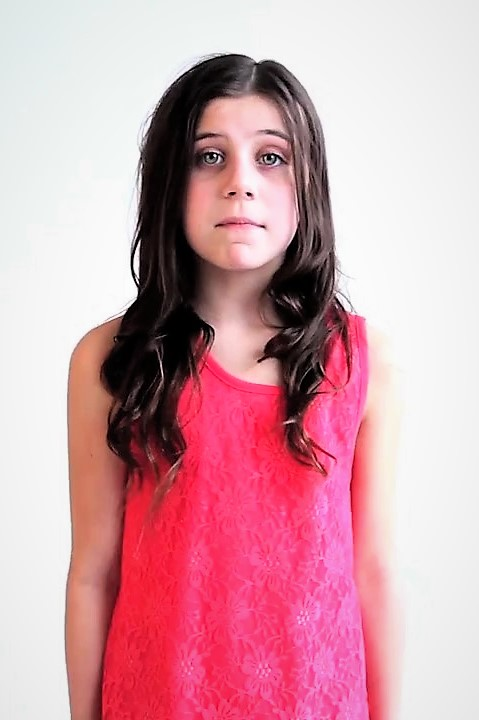
- Jenness in 2015
- Born: December 14, 2005 (age 20); Livingston, New Jersey, U.S.
- Occupation: Actress
- Years active: 2011–present
- Mother: Emily Bauer
- Website: www.miasinclairjenness.com

Mia Sinclair Jenness (born December 14, 2005) is an American teen theater actress. She was one of three girls who rotated as the star title character on the US tour for Matilda the Musical. In the off-Broadway play Mary Page Marlowe, she portrays the 12-year-old version of Mary. In 2018, she voiced the title character Nancy Clancy on Disney Junior's animated television series Fancy Nancy. She also had an ensemble and understudy role on the 2014–15 Broadway production of Les Miserables. She portrayed Lily Nill in the pilot episode for the TV series Panic. She voices young Powder in the Netflix League of Legends-based series Arcane.

== Early life ==
Jenness grew up in Millburn, New Jersey and is the daughter of actress Emily Bauer. In 2012, at age six, she participated in the play And a Child Shall Lead, which is about the Terezin concentration camp. Her brother, Brady Jenness, is also an actor.

== Personal life ==
Jenness lives in Hell's Kitchen, Manhattan.

== Filmography ==
=== Film ===
Year	Title	Role	Notes
2011	A Letter to Momo	Umi (English version, voice)	
2015	Hotel Transylvania 2	Additional Voices	
2016	Under the Shadow	Dorsa (English version, voice)	
2020	10 Things We Should Do Before We Break Up	Wallace	
2021	Child of Kamiari Month	Kanna (English version, voice)	
2022	The Storied Life of A.J. Fikry	Molly Klock	

=== Television ===
Year	Title	Role	Notes
2012	Celebrity Ghost Stories	Kady	Season 4 Episode 4
2017	Orange Is the New Black	Young Frieda	Season 5 Episode 2
2017	Welcome to the Wayne	Pracky Singer (singing voice)	Season 1 Episode 3
2017	Sesame Street	Twinkle Twinkle Little Elmo	Season 47 Episode 6
2018	Blue Bloods	Emily Bennett	Season 8 Episode 19
2018	Raven's Home	Leslie	Season 2 Episodes 12 and 13
2019	Better Things	Young Sam	Season 3 Episode 10
2018-2022	Fancy Nancy	Nancy Clancy (voice)	
2021-2024	Arcane	Powder (voice)	
