= Ma meilleure ennemie =

Single by Stromae and Pomme

from the album Arcane League of Legends: Season 2
- Language: French
- Released: 6 December 2024
- Length: 2:27
- Label: Riot Games
- Songwriters: Paul Van Haver; Claire Pommet; Alexander Seaver; Luc Van Haver
- Producers: Stromae; Alexander Seaver; Luc Van Haver

Stromae singles chronology
"Mon amour" (2022)	"Ma meilleure ennemie" (2024)	"Que ce soit clair" (2025)

Pomme singles chronology
"Nelly" (2022)	"Ma meilleure ennemie" (2024)

Music video
- "Ma meilleure ennemie" on YouTube

"Ma meilleure ennemie" (English: 'My Best Enemy') is a song by Belgian singer-songwriter Stromae and French musician Pomme. It was released on 23 November 2024 as part of the soundtrack to the second season of the Netflix animated series Arcane (2024), and later impacted Italian radio on 6 December, through Riot Games and Virgin Music.

The song was written by the artists alongside Alexander Seaver, as well as Stromae's brother and long-time collaborator Luc Van Haver. In April 2025, an extended version of the soundtrack was released, which includes a new version of "Ma meilleure ennemie" featuring British rock band Coldplay and Palestinian-Chilean singer Elyanna.

== Background ==
On 23 November 2024, Stromae took to social media to announce his collaboration with Pomme, saying they "crafted a special song" for the final season of the series Arcane, which was released on Netflix the same day.

The song marked the return of the singer after a two-year break from music and the cancellation of his Multitude Tour in early 2023 for health reasons.

"Ma meilleure ennemie" plays during "Pretend Like It's the First Time", the seventh episode of Arcane's second season. It accompanies a key scene that sees the characters Ekko and Powder dancing.

== Commercial performance ==
"Ma meilleure ennemie" debuted at number 8 on the global Spotify chart with over 5.9 million streams, a record among French-language tracks. According to Mediatraffic, the song also moved 145,000 units during its first week worldwide.

== Charts ==
=== Weekly charts ===
Weekly chart performance
Chart (2024–2025)	Peak position
Argentina Hot 100 (Billboard)	73
Australia (ARIA)	23
Austria (Ö3 Austria Top 40)	28
Belarus Airplay (TopHit)	4
Belgium (Ultratop 50 Flanders)	8
Belgium (Ultratop 50 Wallonia)	1
Bolivia (Billboard)	9
Brazil Hot 100 (Billboard)	27
Canada Hot 100 (Billboard)	29
Chile (Billboard)	14
CIS Airplay (TopHit)	13
Croatia (Billboard)	19
Czech Republic Singles Digital (ČNS IFPI)	2
Ecuador (Billboard)	22
Finland (Suomen virallinen lista)	19
France (SNEP)	1
Germany (GfK)	28
Global 200 (Billboard)	11
Greece International (IFPI)	1
Hungary (Single Top 40)	11
Ireland (IRMA)	18
Israel (Mako Hitlist)	72
Italy (FIMI)	54
Kazakhstan Airplay (TopHit)	4
Latvia Airplay (TopHit)	12
Latvia Streaming (LaIPA)	2
Lebanon (Lebanese Top 20)	4
Lithuania (AGATA)	2
Luxembourg (Billboard)	4
Moldova Airplay (TopHit)	102
Netherlands (Dutch Top 40)	31
Netherlands (Single Top 100)	21
New Zealand (Recorded Music NZ)	11
Norway (VG-lista)	31
Peru (Billboard)	19
Philippines (Philippines Hot 100)	82
Poland (Polish Streaming Top 100)	2
Portugal (AFP)	7
Romania (Billboard)	7
Russia Airplay (TopHit)	12
Singapore (RIAS)	13
Slovakia Singles Digital (ČNS IFPI)	5
Spain (Promusicae)	28
Suriname (Nationale Top 40)	28
Sweden (Sverigetopplistan)	30
Switzerland (Schweizer Hitparade)	4
Turkey International Airplay (Radiomonitor Türkiye)	2
Ukraine Airplay (TopHit)	113
United Arab Emirates (IFPI)	18
UK Singles (Official Charts)	19
US Billboard Hot 100	69
US World Digital Song Sales (Billboard)	2

=== Monthly charts ===
Monthly chart performance
Chart (2024–2025)	Peak position
Belarus Airplay (TopHit)	15
CIS Airplay (TopHit)	17
Kazakhstan Airplay (TopHit)	6
Latvia Airplay (TopHit)	21
Lithuania Airplay (TopHit)	16
Russia Airplay (TopHit)	17

=== Year-end charts ===
Year-end chart performance
Chart (2025)	Position
Belarus Airplay (TopHit)	47
Belgium (Ultratop 50 Flanders)	103
Belgium (Ultratop 50 Wallonia)	6
CIS Airplay (TopHit)	80
France (SNEP)	30
Global 200 (Billboard)	200
Kazakhstan Airplay (TopHit)	24
Latvia Airplay (TopHit)	158
Lithuania Airplay (TopHit)	171
Russia Airplay (TopHit)	80
Switzerland (Schweizer Hitparade)	89

== Certifications ==
Certifications
Region	Certification	Certified units/sales
Australia (ARIA)	Gold	35,000^{‡}
Belgium (BRMA)	Platinum	20,000^{‡}
France (SNEP)	Diamond	333,333^{‡}
New Zealand (RMNZ)	Gold	15,000^{‡}
United Kingdom (BPI)	Silver	200,000^{‡}
United States (RIAA)	Gold	500,000^{‡}
Streaming
Greece (IFPI Greece)	Gold	1,000,000^{†}
^{‡} Sales+streaming figures based on certification alone.^{†} Streaming-only figures based on certification alone.

== Release history ==
Release dates and formats
Region	Date	Format(s)	Label(s)	Ref.
Italy	6 December 2024	Radio airplay	Riot Games; Virgin	

== See also ==
- List of number-one hits of 2024 (France)
- List of Ultratop 50 number-one singles of 2024
