= Wildlike =

- Theatrical release poster
- Directed by: Frank Hall Green
- Written by: Frank Hall Green
- Produced by: Frank Hall Green; Julie Christeas; Schuyler Weiss; Joseph Stephans
- Starring: Bruce Greenwood; Ella Purnell; Brian Geraghty
- Cinematography: Hillary Spera
- Edited by: Mako Kamitsuna
- Music by: Daniel Bensi; Saunder Jurriaans
- Production companies: Killer Films; Tandem Pictures; Greenmachine Films
- Distributed by: Amplify
- Release dates: October 10, 2014 (Hamptons International Film Festival); September 25, 2015 (United States)
- Running time: 104 minutes
- Country: United States
- Language: English

Wildlike is a 2014 American feature film written and directed by Frank Hall Green. Filmed in Alaska and starring Ella Purnell, Bruce Greenwood, Brian Geraghty, Nolan Gerard Funk and Ann Dowd, it has a 92% Fresh rating on Rotten Tomatoes, and has played over 150 film festivals and won over 100 festival awards. It was filmed on location in Denali National Park, Juneau, Anchorage, Palmer, Whittier, Matanuska Glacier, and on the state ferry boat Kennicott run by the Alaska Marine Highway System.

The film was produced by Green, with Julie Christeas, Schuyler Weiss and Joseph Stephans, and executive-produced by Christine Vachon. The director of photography was Hillary Spera, and it was edited by Mako Kamitsuna. The score was composed by Daniel Bensi and Saunder Jurriaans, and the production designer was Chad Keith.

== Plot ==
Mackenzie (Ella Purnell), a 14-year-old girl, is sent to stay with her uncle (Brian Geraghty) in Juneau, Alaska, at the request of her drug-addicted mother following her hospitalization and the unavailability of another guardian, her father having died the preceding year. Her mother informs her daughter of her plan to rent an apartment in Seattle (around their "grand ole neighbourhood") and receive outpatient care but seeks time to settle things out. However, after being molested by her uncle whom she had been entrusted to, she runs away and ends up finding healing in a journey across the state of Alaska, following an older widowed backpacker (Bruce Greenwood) in the hope of eventually reaching her final destination, Seattle.

== Cast ==
- Ella Purnell as Mackenzie
- Bruce Greenwood as Rene Bartlett
- Brian Geraghty as Uncle
- Ann Dowd as Jeanie
- Nolan Gerard Funk as Tommy

== Release ==
A joint project by Greenmachine Film, Tandem Pictures and Killer Films Wildlike was released nationwide in 2015 to positive reviews. It opened the 2014 Anchorage International Film Festival, and was screened at the Napa Valley Film Festival, Athens International Film Festival. and the Oceanside International Film Festival.

After screening at the 2015 Hamptons International Film Festival, it was shown at over 200 others, including the Woodstock, Napa Valley, Newport Beach, IndieMemphis, Woods Hole, Cleveland, Cork, Austin, Atlanta, Independent Boston, Savannah, Cucalorus, and St. Louis, and Minneapolis-St. Paul International film festivals. It was also shown at Hawaii's Big Island Film Festival, where it received the Best Feature prize.

On Rotten Tomatoes, Wildlike holds an approval rating of 92% based on 13 reviews, and an average rating of 7.4/10.

== Awards and honors ==
Awards and Nominations received by Wildlike
Award	Category	Nominee	Result
2015 Phoenix Film Festival	Best Picture	Wildlike	Won
2015 Phoenix Film Festival	Best Acting Ensemble	Wildlike	Won
2015 Phoenix Film Festival	Best Screenplay	Wildlike	Won
