= Ella Purnell =

British actress (born 1996)

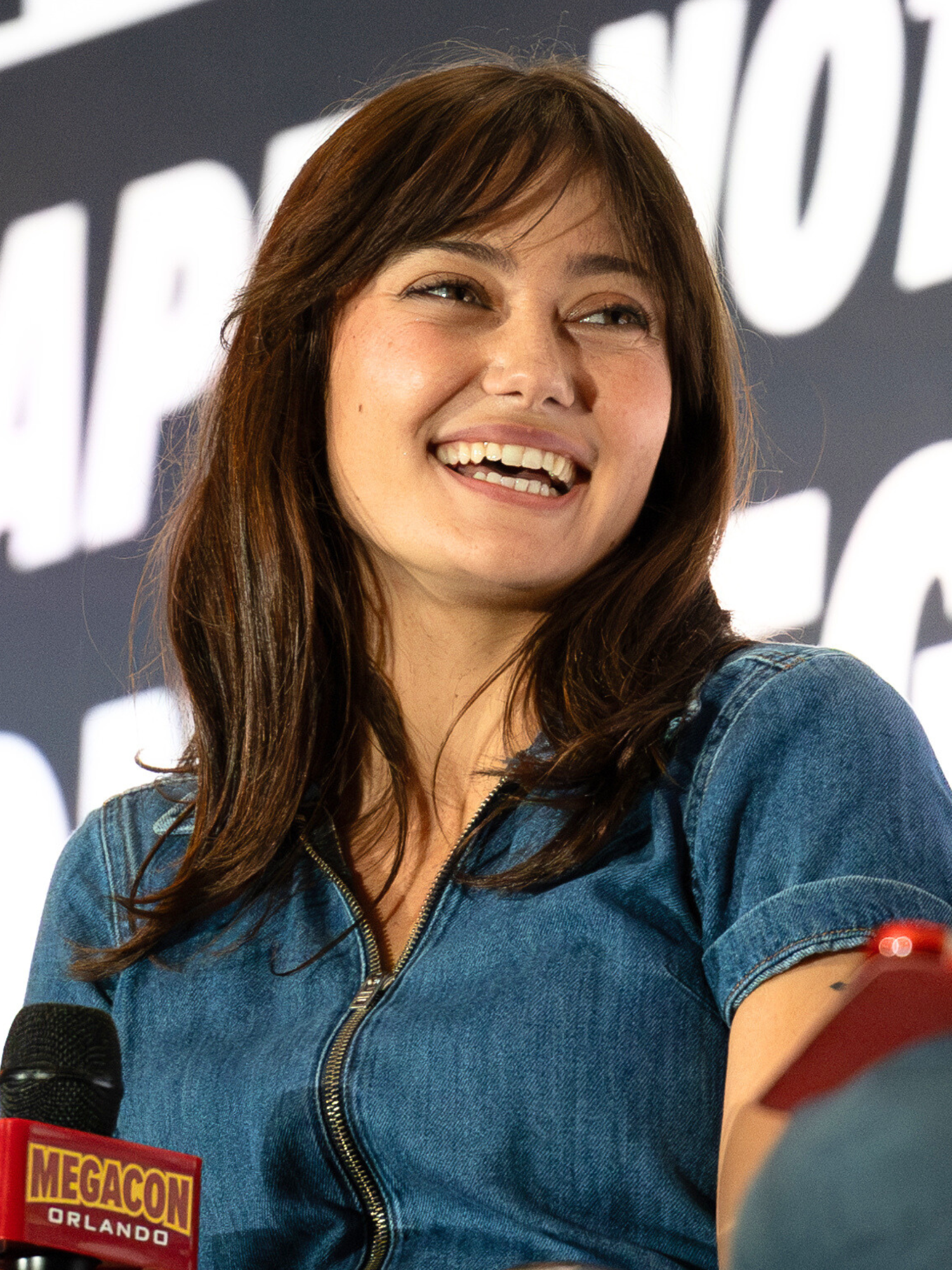
- Purnell at the MegaCon Orlando in 2025
- Born: Ella Summer Reed Purnell; 17 September 1996 (age 30); London, England
- Occupation: Actress
- Years active: 2009–present

Ella Summer Reed Purnell (born 17 September 1996) is an English actress. She began her career as a child actress in West End theatre and films, including Never Let Me Go (2010), Intruders (2011) and Maleficent (2014). Her other films include Miss Peregrine's Home for Peculiar Children (2016), Churchill (2017) and Army of the Dead (2021).

On television, Purnell starred in the series Ordeal by Innocence (2018) and Belgravia (2020). She is known for her work in the critically acclaimed series, Yellowjackets (2021–present), Fallout (2024–present) and Sweetpea (2024–present). She voiced Jinx in Arcane (2021–2024) and Gwyndala in Star Trek: Prodigy (2021–2024).

== Early life ==
Purnell was born in the Whitechapel area of East London on 17 September 1996 and grew up in the city's Bethnal Green area. She has three younger half-brothers from her mother's second marriage. Purnell attended Bethnal Green Montessori, the City of London School for Girls and then Forest School. She attended classes at the Young Actors Theatre Islington and the Sylvia Young Theatre School.

At age 18, Purnell intended to pause her acting career and earn a place at university, intending to become a children's writer or teacher. She decided to travel the world for a year to "find herself" but returned to acting when offered a role in Tim Burton's Miss Peregrine's Home for Peculiar Children (2016), which she accepted as it had been her dream to work with Burton. She described her decision to defer university as "bittersweet at first because it felt like a lost opportunity of a different path in life" but was glad to have chosen acting.

== Career ==
At age 8, Purnell starred in a Croatian commercial for Toffifee. At 13, she was cast in a 2009 production of Oliver! at London's Theatre Royal, Drury Lane. Towards the end of her time in the show, she was cast as the younger version of Keira Knightley's character in Mark Romanek's film Never Let Me Go (2010). She was then cast as Kayleigh in Gustavo Ron's film Ways to Live Forever (2010) and as Mia in Juan Carlos Fresnadillo's film Intruders (2011). She was named by Screen International as one of its 10 UK Stars of Tomorrow in 2010. She later appeared in the BBC HD short film Candy (2011).

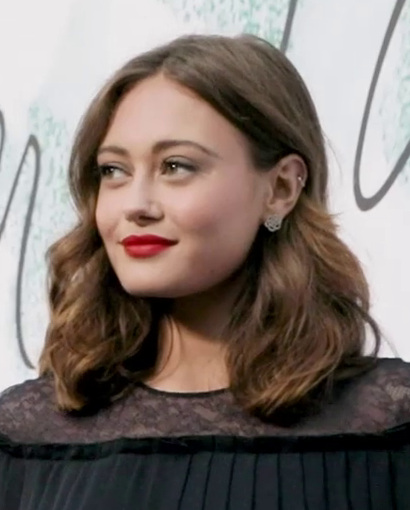
Purnell at the 2017 Serpentine Summer Party at Kensington Gardens, London

Purnell appeared as Dolce in Jeff Wadlow's film Kick-Ass 2 (2013) and starred in Frank Hall Green's film Wildlike (2014), which earned her accolades at festivals. She played the teenage version of Angelina Jolie's titular character in Maleficent (2014). She appeared in the Channel 4 film Cyberbully (2015) with Maisie Williams. She returned to film star in Tim Burton's Miss Peregrine's Home for Peculiar Children (2016) as she had always wanted to work with him. She next played Mia in the film Access All Areas (2017), and Winston Churchill's secretary Helen Garrett in the historical drama Churchill (2017).

In 2018, Purnell appeared as Hester Argyll in the BBC miniseries Ordeal by Innocence and starred as Tess in the Starz series Sweetbitter. Starz cancelled the latter series after two seasons. Purnell played Lady Maria Grey in Julian Fellowes' period drama Belgravia (2020) and began starring as Jackie Taylor in the Showtime drama series Yellowjackets (2021–present). She voiced Gwyn in the animated series Star Trek: Prodigy (2021), and voiced Jinx in the Netflix series Arcane (2021–2024). She began starring as Lucy MacLean in the Amazon Prime Video series Fallout (2024–present), and as the main character in the dark comedy series Sweetpea (2024–present), garnering critical praise for both. She also served as an executive producer for Sweetpea.

== Personal life ==
As of May 2024, Purnell divides her time between London and Los Angeles. Discussing her views on fame with British Vogue, Purnell shared: "There's no end goal for me that revolves around success. It revolves around my personal growth and personal challenges."

She plays the piano and also enjoys scuba diving.

== Advocacy ==
In 2016, Purnell worked with her former Forest School schoolmate Arifa Nasim to launch Educate2Eradicate, a UK-based organisation building on Nasim's grassroots efforts to eradicate honour-based violence and addressing the issue of forced child-marriage.

In 2019, Purnell commented on the importance of diversity in Hollywood and wanting to use her platform to raise awareness: "I am no longer willing to be complicit in this industry. Don’t get me wrong; I love acting, I grew up in this world. I’m very grateful. But I’m also very aware of how damaging it can be in its lack of diversity and representation. I want to be more conscious with who I work with, and what I work on. I want to use any platform I have to bring awareness to issues that matter. I want to help people and be a part of positive change."

== Filmography ==
=== Film ===
Key
†	Denotes films that have not yet been released

Year	Title	Role	Notes
2010	Never Let Me Go	Young Ruth	
2010	Ways to Live Forever	Kayleigh	
2011	Intruders	Mia	
2013	Kick-Ass 2	Dolce	
2014	Wildlike	MacKenzie	
2014	Maleficent	Teen Maleficent	
2016	The Legend of Tarzan	Young Jane Porter	Uncredited
2016	Miss Peregrine's Home for Peculiar Children	Emma Bloom	
2017	Churchill	Helen Garrett	
2018	UFO	Natalie	
2021	Army of the Dead	Kate Ward	
TBA	The Scurry †		Post-production
TBA	The Return of Stanley Atwell †	Pamela	Post-production

=== Television ===
Key
†	Denotes TV productions that have not yet been released

Year	Title	Role	Notes
2015	Cyberbully	Megan	Television film
2018	Ordeal by Innocence	Hester Argyll	Miniseries, 3 episodes
2018–2019	Sweetbitter	Tess	Main role, 14 episodes
2020	Belgravia	Lady Maria Grey	Miniseries, 6 episodes
2021–2024	Star Trek: Prodigy	Gwyn (voice)	Main role, 40 episodes
2021–2024	Arcane	Jinx (voice)	Main role, 15 episodes
2021–present	Yellowjackets	Jackie Taylor	Main role (10 episodes, season 1), recurring role (6 episodes, seasons 2–3)
2024	Invincible	Jane (voice)	1 episodes
2024–present	Fallout	Lucy MacLean	Main role, 16 episodes
2024–present	Sweetpea	Rhiannon Lewis	Main role, 6 episodes; also executive producer

=== Video games ===
Year	Title	Role	Notes
2026	Call of Duty: Black Ops 7	Lucy MacLean	Playable character in Multiplayer modes; part of Fallout collaboration

== Awards and nominations ==
Year	Organizations	Category	Work	Result	Ref.
2015	Fargo Film Festival	Best Actress	WildLike	Won	
2015	Brooklyn Film Festival	Best Actress	WildLike	Won	
2018	National Film Awards UK	Best Newcomer	Access All Areas	Nominated	
2021	Annie Awards	Outstanding Achievement for Voice Acting in an Animated Television/Broadcast Production	Arcane	Won	
2023	Hollywood Critics Association TV Awards	Best Guest Actress in a Drama Series	Yellowjackets	Nominated	
2024	Canneseries	Madame Figaro Rising Star Award	Fallout	Won	
2024	Astra TV Awards	Best Actress in a Streaming Drama Series	Fallout	Nominated	
