= Vi (League of Legends) =

Video game character

Vi, The Piltover Enforcer
- League of Legends character
- Official artwork of Piltover Enforcer Vi
- First appearance: League of Legends (December 19, 2012 update)
- Created by: Graham McNeill
- Designed by: Josh Singh (original); Paul Kwon (redesign)
- Voiced by: Cia Court; Hailee Steinfeld (Arcane)

In-universe information
- Significant other: Caitlyn Kiramman (Girlfriend)
- Home: Piltover

Vi (born Violet) is a character from Riot Games' League of Legends media franchise. She was introduced as a playable character, or "Champion" within the game's lore, in a December 2012 update for the 2009 multiplayer online battle arena video game of the same name, which was complemented by an official upload track to commemorate her introduction. She is presented as an impulsive and contemptuous woman who uses a massive pair of gauntlets powered with magical energy as her weapon of choice. Although she is nicknamed The Piltover Enforcer because of her association with the city's Guardians, she is a former criminal who hails from Zaun, originally the undercity region of Piltover. She is the archenemy as well as older sister of the terrorist Jinx, another League of Legends Champion.

Vi has appeared in various derivative works of the franchise, most notably as one of the lead characters of the Netflix animated series Arcane, where she is voiced by Hailee Steinfeld. Storylines explored by Arcane that involve Vi include her history with Jinx, who was originally named Powder, as well as her eventual love interest, the Piltover noblewoman Caitlyn Kiramman. Vi has received a generally positive reception, especially for Arcane's iteration of the character.

== Concept and design ==
Riot Games designer Josh Singh originally conceived the character as a girl named Ruby, who wears roller-skates. Singh's original concept was discarded after two years of development; she was renamed and redesigned by Paul Kwon, who gave her the code name "Piltover Enforcer". Kwon's colleague August Browning approved of his character work and decided to utilize the character as part of the team's ongoing work with introducing new playable Champions for League of Legends. Browning leaned on Kwon's illustration of Vi with oversized gloves, and as a result her gameplay mechanics are primarily based on the archetype of a punk girl with an aggressive personality.

Graham McNeill was the writer responsible for coming up with Vi's backstory as an ex-criminal who assumes the role of a "bad cop" on behalf of the prosperous city of Piltover. Vi was the first League of Legends champion to receive a login screen accompanied by an original, lyrical song track performed by Nicki Taylor and Cia Court, her English voice actress for the video game. Christian Linke and Alex Yee were involved with the lyrical song track, as well as the music and narrative storyboarding for Get Jinxed, the first character-driven cinematic released for a League of Legends champion which served to introduce Jinx, Vi's sister. Linke and Yee would later serve as showrunners of the animated television series adaptation of League of Legends, Arcane.

By September 2021, Netflix announced that Vi would be one of the lead characters of Arcane, and that Hailee Steinfeld was cast for the role. For Linke and Yee, the starring roles for Jinx and Vi in the series' narrative is a natural continuation of their creative work on both characters which began nine years before the release of Arcane's season one. In an interview with Engadget, Linke explained that Jinx and Vi were always intriguing characters to work with because they offer very different perspectives when paired with each other: not only do they possess opposing personalities with a sharp contrast in their visual design and in-universe role, they are more "grounded" compared to the game's more fantastical champions. Linke and Yee also used the existent mysteries set up by League of Legends, where their familial relations and enmity with each other are only hinted at in-game, to explore their pasts and the origins of their rivalry through the storylines written for Arcane. The show gave Linke and Yee an opportunity to focus on the small character details, like Vi's compulsive habit of bouncing her leg as a nuanced nervous tick, with the goal of making the characters' expressions feel real.

Vi and Caitlyn seemingly share romantic chemistry in certain scenes of Arcane. Linke and Yee intentionally kept the slower pacing of Vi and Caitlyn's relationship as they wanted to tell an organic story about the characters that feels true to their personalities and how they have been seen within the game. While the first season of Arcane primarily follows Vi's complicated relationship with Jinx, the showrunners indicated that the show's focus will shift to the developing relationship between Vi and Caitlyn for the second season.

== Appearances ==
=== League of Legends ===
Vi was added to the roster of playable Champions for League of Legends on December 19, 2012. Vi's main weapons are the "Atlas Gauntlet", two massive gloves powered by Hextech that increases her physical strength to superhuman levels. Her gameplay mechanics have undergone a number of revisions since her introduction. Dot Esports noted while Vi's original moveset and statistics stood out for being more suited for the top lane, her abilities and their effects have remained mostly the same without any major changes. The character was banned from professional play for a time in early 2020 due to a potentially game-breaking bug. A “micropatch” was released in November 2021 to downgrade her base statistics and ultimate abilities, which were unintentionally boosted by a prior rescript that in Riot's opinion made her somewhat overpowered.

As established in flavor text written by McNeill, Vi grew up in one of the poorest areas of Zaun. She learned to survive its rough conditions using her brawn and wits, and eventually took leadership of a street gang at a young age, though she has always adhered to a strict moral code she imposed on herself. She disappeared during a time of great turmoil between Zaun and Piltover and was thought to be dead, only to reappear years later as Sheriff Caitlyn Kiramman's trusted partner in the Guardian corps.

Vi's relationship with Jinx, another Champion who would taunt her whenever they encounter each other, was the focus of speculation and fan theories from fans for many years prior to the release of Arcane. Vi also has specific interactions with another League of Legends Champion, Caitlyn, who is presented as her ally and colleague within series lore. Their respective lines of dialogue were interpreted by some players to be of a romantic nature, which were confirmed by the release of Arcane in 2021.

=== Arcane ===
Vi as depicted in Arcane

Arcane establishes that Vi, shortened from Violet, and Jinx, originally known as Powder, are sisters who were orphaned following the repressed undercity's failed uprising against the utopian city of Piltover. Along with two other orphans named Mylo and Claggor, they were both adopted by Vander, the leader of the rebellion.

At the start of the first season, Vi leads her siblings in stealing a set of arcane crystals from Piltover scientist Jayce, but Powder accidentally causes an explosion that attracts attention from Piltover's enforcers. Vi wants to turn herself in to the authorities, but Vander takes her place to protect her, only to be taken away by his former friend Silco. Attempting to help rescue Vander, Powder causes an explosion with the stolen crystals, but it results in the deaths of Vander, Mylo, and Claggor. Furious and distraught, Vi blames Powder, calling her a "jinx" and leaving. Soon after, Vi is abducted by a corrupt Piltover enforcer and imprisoned without trial.

After spending many years in prison, Vi is released by Caitlyn Kiramman, a young, upstart Piltover enforcer who requests her assistance in investigating Silco's criminal enterprise. Returning to the undercity, now called Zaun, Vi and Caitlyn gather evidence. In a notable scene, Vi appears to flirt with Caitlyn, calling her "hot" and nicknaming her "cupcake". They also encounter Vi's sister, who now goes by the moniker of "Jinx" after having been adopted by Silco.

Frustrated by the Piltover council's inaction, Vi allies with Jayce to assault Silco's operations with a contingent of Piltover enforcers, but the two soon part ways after Jayce inadvertently kills a child worker and becomes guilt-ridden. Later, Jinx abducts Vi, Caitlyn, and Silco. Vi attempts to appeal to her sister's better nature after she threatens Caitlyn; Jinx instead shoots Silco to death by accident after she suffers a traumatic attack. Discarding her old identity as Powder, Jinx fires a rocket at the Piltover council building.

Season two begins in the aftermath of Jinx's attack on the council, during which Caitlyn's mother was killed. In response, the surviving council members plan to send an army of enforcers into Zaun. Caitlyn, desiring revenge against Jinx, intends to go with them. While Vi believes that Jinx has no hope of redemption, she adamantly refuses Caitlyn's request that she join the enforcers, choosing instead to leave Caitlyn's house and drink. Awakening hungover the next morning, Vi decides to go to the memorial for the dead councilors after learning how adamantly Caitlyn attempted to convince the enforcers to let Vi join them. However, a Zaunite crime lord launches an assault on the memorial, which is ultimately stopped by Noxian warlord Ambessa Medarda.

Vi joins a strike force led by Caitlyn, intended to locate Jinx and bring down the remnants of Silco's empire. During this time, Caitlyn releases toxic smog into Zaun and grows increasingly aggressive. Privately, Vi asks Caitlyn not to change like everyone else in her life has, and they kiss. Ultimately, Caitlyn and Vi confront Jinx, and Vi is able to pin her to the ground. However, when a child named Isha tries to block Caitlyn from shooting Jinx, Vi prevents Caitlyn from shooting at Jinx and Isha, allowing Jinx to escape. Angered at having lost her chance for vengeance, Caitlyn abandons Vi.

Practically alone, Vi becomes a pit fighter in Zaun, but eventually becomes alcoholic and starts losing fights. One day, Jinx appears and reveals to Vi that Vander is still alive, having been revived as a wolf-like beast. Vi begrudgingly accompanies Jinx and Isha, believing that Jinx is delusional before they confront Vander and temporarily calm his animalistic rage. Hoping to heal Vander, they bring him to Viktor, a "herald" who promises to restore Vander's humanity. However, Vi encounters Caitlyn, who reveals that she has been working with Ambessa, who intends to capture Vander. Realizing that Vander is Vi's father, Caitlyn works with Vi to trick Ambessa and protect Vander. However, Vander descends into a feral rage just as Ambessa and her soldiers arrive. Isha sacrifices herself to protect Jinx, and Vi is knocked unconscious.

Upon awakening, Vi discovers Jinx has been arrested and lashes out at Caitlyn for both imprisoning her and for being manipulated by Ambessa. Vi then frees Jinx, only for the latter to lock Vi into her own prison cell, having grown suicidal in the wake of Isha's death and wanting Vi to be free of guilt for failing to save her sister. Soon, Caitlyn frees Vi, and they have sex in the cell. Later, Vi and Jinx fight alongside Piltover and Zaun in a final battle against Ambessa's army and Viktor. Vander attempts to kill Vi in another feral rampage, causing Jinx to seemingly sacrifice herself to save her sister. In the aftermath of the battle, Vi and Caitlyn live together.

=== Other appearances ===
Vi has appeared in several League of Legends spin-off titles, including Teamfight Tactics, Legends of Runeterra, League of Legends: Wild Rift and 2XKO. In addition, Vi has been featured in various cross-promotional marketing efforts for Arcane. She appears as a playable character in PUBG Mobile, and as an outfit option in Fortnite and Among Us. On December 10, 2019, Riot released a short story starring Vi titled "Child of Zaun", which follows her journey back to Zaun as part of an investigation.

== Promotion and reception ==
On July 2, 2021, Riot released a fully instrumental album titled Sessions: Vi, along with a YouTube animated video that spans the entire album. Riot collaborated with 21 different artists for the album, which has 37 tracks and spans one hour and 40 minutes. The album features lo-fi music which are themed after the idea of Vi unwinding to relaxing tunes as soon as she arrives home from work. Official merchandise themed after Vi include a PVC statue, and a long sleeve t-shirt.

Vi is one of the most popular and recognizable League of Legends champions. Ethan Garcia from Dot Esports described Vi as "a character who changed the perception of League in other media". The character's distinct appearance makes her popular subject for cosplay activities. By December 2021, Vi was identified with a pick rate of 9.4% among League of Legends players, placing her among the game's most played characters at the time.

Vi's depiction in Arcane garnered praise from audiences and critics, which contributed to her renewed popularity among League of Legends players in the 2020s. Hailee Steinfeld's vocal performance was praised by critics. Xan Indigo from Screen Rant appreciated her portrayal as a self-willed and independent woman and her virtues of empathy, humanity and understanding. Jade King from The Gamer praised her character design, and expressed an appreciation that her physical characterization went beyond the male gaze, avoiding any sexualization of costume or design. King particularly liked how the character's body language and facial expressions, which conveys "an almost masculine swagger", was presented.

Arcane's portrayal of the relationship between Vi and Caitlyn is generally well received. GameRevolution reported that fan response on social media towards the suggestion of a relationship was particularly enthusiastic. Jeff Nelson from The Cheat Sheet highlighted the significance of their depiction as queer characters, in light of Riot Games' sensitivity to LGBTQ issues and their willingness to advocate for better inclusivity in its video games. Drawing a favorable comparison to She-Ra and the Princesses of Power, Indigo praised the handling of Vi's relationship with Caitlyn in Arcane, and the way that it shifts from distrust to intimacy gives "a profound touch of humanity within the series", serving as a metaphor for how it is possible to go beyond the differences between Piltover and Zaun. From Indigo's perspective, their tender moments are not completely left to subtext unlike in the video games, but made explicit by their dialogue and actions within important scenes, without an undue emphasis on stereotypes or having to ever use the term "gay" on the screens. On the other hand, Nico Deyo from Polygon criticized season one's attempt to embrace "queer aesthetics" and its failure to properly portray overt romantic gestures between Vi and Caitlyn, which Deyo described as a "maybeship".
