= Annie Award for Outstanding Achievement for Character Animation in an Animated Television/Broadcast Production =

Annual US television award

Annie Award for Character Animation in an Animated Television/Broadcast Production
- Awarded for: Excellence in character animation
- Country: United States
- Presented by: ASIFA-Hollywood
- First award: 2006
- Currently held by: Alli Sadegiani – Win or Lose (2025)
- Website: annieawards.org

The Annie Award for Character Animation in an Animated Television/Broadcast Production is an Annie Award given annually to the best character animation for television or broadcasting productions. It was first presented at the 34th Annie Awards.

== Winners and nominees ==
=== 2000s ===
Year	Recipient(s)	Notes	Program	Episode(s)	Network
2006 (34th)
2006 (34th)	Ya Jae Myung		Avatar: The Last Airbender	"The Blind Bandit"	Nickelodeon
2006 (34th)	Joshua Jennings		Moral Orel		Adult Swim
2006 (34th)	Sihanouk Mariona		Robot Chicken		Adult Swim
2006 (34th)	Eileen Kohlhepp		Family Guy		Fox
2007 (35th)
2007 (35th)	Eric Towner		Robot Chicken		Adult Swim
2007 (35th)	Monica Kennedy		El Tigre: The Adventures of Manny Rivera		Nickelodeon
2007 (35th)	Elizabeth Harvatine		Moral Orel	"Nature (Part 1)"	Adult Swim
2008 (36th)
2008 (36th)	Pierre Perifel		Secrets of the Furious Five		NBC
2008 (36th)	Joshua A. Jennings		Robot Chicken: Star Wars Episode II		Adult Swim
2008 (36th)	Sandro Cleuzo		Secrets of the Furious Five		NBC
2009 (37th)
2009 (37th)	Phillip To		Monsters vs. Aliens: Mutant Pumpkins from Outer Space		NBC
2009 (37th)	Mark Donald		B.O.B.'s Big Break		Nickelodeon
2009 (37th)	Mark Mitchell		Prep & Landing		ABC
2009 (37th)	Tony Smeed		Prep & Landing		ABC
2009 (37th)	Kevan Shorey		Merry Madagascar		NBC

=== 2010s ===
Year	Recipient(s)	Notes	Program	Episode(s)	Network
2010 (38th)
2010 (38th)	David Pate		Kung Fu Panda Holiday		NBC
2010 (38th)	Savelen Forrest		Robot Chicken: Star Wars Episode III		Adult Swim
2010 (38th)	Elizabeth Harvatine		Robot Chicken: Star Wars Episode III		Adult Swim
2010 (38th)	Nicolas A. Chauvelot		Scared Shrekless		NBC
2010 (38th)	Nideep Varghese		Scared Shrekless		NBC
2011 (39th)
2011 (39th)	Tony Smeed		Prep & Landing: Naughty vs. Nice		ABC
2011 (39th)	Michael Franceschi		Kung Fu Panda: Legends of Awesomeness		Nickelodeon
2011 (39th)	Chad Sellers		Prep & Landing: Naughty vs. Nice		ABC
2011 (39th)	Rebecca Wilson Bresee		Prep & Landing: Naughty vs. Nice		ABC
2011 (39th)	Sihanouk Mariona		Mary Shelley's Frankenhole	"Season 2"	Adult Swim
2012 (40th)
2012 (40th)	Dan Driscoll		SpongeBob SquarePants	"It's a SpongeBob Christmas"	Nickelodeon
2012 (40th)	Jennifer Dickie		Justin Time	"Yodel Odel Day"	Family Jr.
2012 (40th)	Savelen Forrest		SpongeBob SquarePants	"It's a SpongeBob Christmas"	Nickelodeon
2012 (40th)	Sihanouk Mariona		Moral Orel	"Before Orel: Trust"	Adult Swim
2012 (40th)	Shi Zimu		Dragons. Riders of Berk		Cartoon Network
2012 (40th)	Teri Yam		Dragons. Riders of Berk		Cartoon Network
2012 (40th)	Yan Jiazhuang		Dragons. Riders of Berk		Cartoon Network
2012 (40th)	Keith Kellogg		Star Wars: The Clone Wars	"Revenge"	Cartoon Network
2013 (41st)
2013 (41st)	Kureha Yokoo		Toy Story of Terror!		ABC
2013 (41st)	Brad Schaffer		Friendship All-Stars of Friendship	"Wrong Number"	LStudio
2013 (41st)	Keith Kellogg		Star Wars: The Clone Wars		Cartoon Network
2013 (41st)	David DeVan		Toy Story of Terror!		ABC
2013 (41st)	JC Tran Quang Thieu		Toy Story of Terror!		ABC
2013 (41st)	Eric Urban		Übermansion		Adult Swim
2014 (42nd)
2014 (42nd)	Justin Nichols		Wander Over Yonder		Disney Channel
2014 (42nd)	Kim Ken		Toy Story That Time Forgot		ABC
2014 (42nd)	Carlo Vogele		Toy Story That Time Forgot		ABC
2014 (42nd)	Don Crum		Toy Story That Time Forgot		ABC
2014 (42nd)	Teresa Drilling		Tumble Leaf		Prime Video
2014 (42nd)	Michael Granberry		Tumble Leaf		Prime Video
2015 (43rd)
2015 (43rd)	Chi-Ho Chan	Character Animator: Heather, Windshear, Dagur, Savage, Hiccup, Toothless, Berserkers	Dragons: Race to the Edge	"Have Dragon Will Travel, Part 1"	Netflix
2015 (43rd)	Scott DaRos	Character Animator: Buddy, Jovie, Fake Santa #1, Fake Santas	Elf: Buddy's Musical Christmas		NBC
2015 (43rd)	Alfonso Estrada	Character Animator: Buddy, Jovie	Elf: Buddy's Musical Christmas		NBC
2015 (43rd)	Yong-Zhi Sun	Lead Animator: Heather, Windshear, Astrid, Hiccup	Dragons: Race to the Edge	"Have Dragon Will Travel, Part 2"	Netflix
2015 (43rd)	Ryan MacNeil	Character Animator: Smoove Move, Chet, Incidental Characters	Turbo FAST	"Turboldly Go"	Netflix
2015 (43rd)	Maurizio Parimbelli	Character Animator: Peter, Benjamin, Lily, Mittens, Pig Robinson, Ducklings	Peter Rabbit	"The Kitten and Pig Adventure"	Nick Jr. Channel
2015 (43rd)	Justin Nichols	Character Animator: Lord Hater	Wander Over Yonder	"The Good Bad Guy"	Disney XD
2016 (44th)
2016 (44th)	Mike Chaffe	Character Animator: Blinky, Aaarrrgghh!!	Trollhunters: Tales of Arcadia	"Becoming, Part 1"	Netflix
2016 (44th)	Rob Thomson	Lead Animator: Peter, Mom, Nana and other various characters	The Snowy Day		Prime Video
2016 (44th)	Joe Heinen	Lead Animator: Fig, Hedge, Stick, Buckeye, Pine, Beetles	Tumble Leaf	"Mighty Mud Movers / Having a Ball"	Prime Video
2016 (44th)	Dan MacKenzie	Lead Animator: Fig, Hedge, Stick, Okra, Maple, Pine, Buckeye, Gourd, Chickens	Tumble Leaf	"Thinking Outside The Hoop / Fig's HayMaze-ing Wander"	Prime Video
2016 (44th)	Barry Kennedy	Character Animator: Disastro, Phil Felt, Joey Felt, Old	Atomic Puppet		Disney XD/Netflix
2017 (45th)
2017 (45th)	Bruno Chiou, Yi-Fan Cho, Kevin Jong, Chun-Jung Chu, Chris Su	Character Animators, Lead Animators: Blinky, Dictatious, Aaarrrgghh!!	Trollhunters: Tales of Arcadia	"Homecoming"	Netflix
2017 (45th)	Ben Willis	Lead Animator: All Characters	Trolls Holiday		NBC
2017 (45th)	Onur Yeldan	Character Animators: All Characters	Trolls Holiday		NBC
2017 (45th)	Kevan Shorey	Character Animators: All Characters	Trolls Holiday		NBC
2017 (45th)	Michael Granberry, Joe Heinen, Rachel Larsen, Hilary Lile, Dan MacKenzie	Character Animators: Maple, Fig, Stick and Okra, Gourd, Coco, Pine, Zucchini, Grubs, Rutabaga, Beetles, Chicks and Beetle Bus	Tumble Leaf	"Rutabagels / Okra-Ball"	Prime Video
2018 (46th)
2018 (46th)	Scott Lewis	Character Animator: The King, Hilda, Arfur	Hilda		Netflix
2018 (46th)	Sikand Srinivas	Character Animator: All Characters	Age of Sail		Google Spotlight Stories
2018 (46th)	Lucas Vigroux	Character Animator: All Characters	Back to the Moon		Google Spotlight Stories
2018 (46th)	Juliane Martin	Character Animator: Eugene, Rapunzel, Cassandra	Rapunzel's Tangled Adventure	"King Pascal"	Disney Channel
2018 (46th)	Dan MacKenzie	Character Animator: Multiple Characters	Tumble Leaf	"Maple's Sand Stand/Fig's New Clothes"	Prime Video
2019 (47th)
2019 (47th)	Aulo Licinio	Lead Animator: Iroek	His Dark Materials	"Betrayal"	HBO
2019 (47th)	Chris O'Hara	Character Animator: Multiple Characters	Ask the StoryBots	"Where Do Planets Come From?"	Netflix
2019 (47th)	Juliane Martin	Character Animator: Various Characters	Rapunzel's Tangled Adventure	"Rapunzel and The Great Tree"	Disney Channel
2019 (47th)	Andrew Muir	Character Animator: All Characters	How to Train Your Dragon: Homecoming		NBC
2019 (47th)	Scott DaRos	Character Animator: All Characters	Robot Chicken	"Ginger Hill in: Bursting Pipes"	Adult Swim

=== 2020s ===
Year	Recipient(s)	Notes	Program	Episode(s)	Network
2020 (48th)
2020 (48th)	David Laliberté		Hilda		Netflix
2020 (48th)	Lucas Fraga Pacheco		Lamp Life		Disney+
2020 (48th)	Kim Blanchette		Alien Xmas		Netflix
2020 (48th)	James Bowman		BoJack Horseman	"Good Damage"	Netflix
2020 (48th)	Dan MacKenzie		Cosmos: Possible Worlds	"Vavilov"	National Geographic/Fox
2021 (49th)
2021 (49th)	Léa Chervet		Arcane	"The Monster You Created"	Netflix
2021 (49th)	Jon Paul Brower		Namoo		Baobab Studios
2021 (49th)	Dan Gill		Love, Death + Robots	"All Through the House"	Netflix
2021 (49th)	Ghazal Tahernia		Ultra City Smiths	"The Little Baby Hand Pinky Grip"	AMC
2021 (49th)	Stephen Loveluck		We the People	"Active Citizenship"	Netflix
2022 (50th)
2022 (50th)	Tim Watts		The Boy, the Mole, the Fox and the Horse		Apple TV+
2022 (50th)	Aziz Kocanaogullari		Entergalactic		Netflix
2022 (50th)	Kecy Salangad		The House		Netflix
2022 (50th)	Toshihiro Nakamura		Oni: Thunder God's Tale	"The Mighty Storm Gods"	Netflix
2022 (50th)	Henrique Baron		StoryBots: Answer Time	"Taste"	Netflix
2023 (51st)
2023 (51st)	Alex Bard		Blue Eye Samurai	"Episodes 101, 104 and 106"	Netflix
2023 (51st)	Alex Small-Butera		Adventure Time: Fionna and Cake	"The Winter King"	Max
2023 (51st)	Kevin Temmer		The Amazing Digital Circus	"Pilot"	Glitch Productions (Note: Released on YouTube.)
2023 (51st)	Andre DeVilliers		Kizazi Moto: Generation Fire	"Moremi, Surf Sangoma, Stardust"	Disney+
2023 (51st)	Laurie Sitzia		Star Wars: Visions	"I Am Your Mother"	Disney+
2024 (52nd)
2024 (52nd)	Tom Gouill		Arcane	"Killing is a Cycle", "Heavy is the Crown", "Finally Got the Name Right", "The Message Hidden Within the Pattern", "The Dirt Under Your Nails", "Pretend Like It's the First Time" and "Blisters and Bedrock"	Netflix
2024 (52nd)	Travis Hathaway		Dream Productions	"The Dream Team", "Out of Body" and "Romance!"	Disney+
2024 (52nd)	Jeff Riley		In the Know	"Yogurt Week" and "Thinksgiving"	Peacock
2024 (52nd)	Colin Lepper		The Patrick Star Show	"Something Stupid This Way Comes"	Nickelodeon
2024 (52nd)	Raymond Dunster		Star Trek: Lower Decks	"Various episodes"	Paramount+
2025 (53rd)
2025 (53rd)	Alli Sadegiani		Win or Lose		Disney+
2025 (53rd)	Floriane Caseiro		Asterix and Obelix: The Big Fight	"Episode III"	Netflix
2025 (53rd)	Brendan Gottlieb		Forevergreen		Nathan Engelhardt and Jeremy Spears
2025 (53rd)	Chris Derochie		Snoopy Presents: A Summer Musical		Apple TV
2025 (53rd)	Nik Ranieri		The Simpsons		Fox
