= Annie Award for Outstanding Achievement for Animated Effects in an Animated Television/Broadcast Production =

Annual US television award

Annie Award for Animated Effects in an Animated Television/Broadcast Production
- Awarded for: Excellence in animated effects
- Country: United States
- Presented by: ASIFA-Hollywood
- First award: 2018
- Currently held by: Edward Ferrysienanda, Kevin Christensen, Guy Shuleman, Benedikt Roettger, and Kevin Tarpinian – Prehistoric Planet: Ice Age (2025)
- Website: annieawards.org

The Annie Award for Animated Effects in an Animated Television/Broadcast Production is an Annie Award given annually to the best animated effects in television or broadcast productions. It was first presented at the 46th Annie Awards.

== Winners and nominees ==
=== 2010s ===
Year	Program	Episode(s)	Recipient(s)	Network/Company
2018 (46th)
2018 (46th)	Trollhunters: Tales of Arcadia	"The Eternal Knight Pt. 2"	David M.V. Jones (Visual Effects Supervisor); Vincent Chou (Overseas FX Supervisor); Clare Yang (Overseas Lead FX Artist)	Netflix
2018 (46th)	DreamWorks Theatre Presents Kung Fu Panda		Zach Glynn, Shyh-Chyuan Huang, Michael Losure, K.C. Ong, Alex Timchenko (FX Artists)	DreamWorks Animation
2018 (46th)	Rise of the Teenage Mutant Ninja Turtles		Jeffrey Lai (FX Animator)	Nickelodeon
2018 (46th)	SuperMansion	"Debbie Does Devizo"	Mike Spitzmiller (VFX Supervisor); Steve Gallant (VFX Lead Artist); Iain Collins, Daniel Craven, Lynda Rollins (VFX Artists)	Crackle
2018 (46th)	Watership Down	"The Journey"	Philip Child (VFX Supervisor); Nilesh Sardesai (CG Supervisor)	Netflix
2019 (47th)
2019 (47th)	Love, Death & Robots	"The Secret War"	Viktor Németh, Szabolcs Illés, Ádám Sipos, Vladimir Zhovna (FX Artists)	Netflix
2019 (47th)	How to Train Your Dragon: Homecoming		Manuel Reyes Halaby (VFX Supervisor); Cristiana Covone, Koya Masubuchi, Jean Claude Nouchy (FX Artists); Dustin Henning (Compositing Lead)	NBC
2019 (47th)	My Moon		Stéphane Coëdel (Compositing Director); Natan Moura (Animation Director)	Eusong Lee / Chromosphere
2019 (47th)	Star Wars: Galaxy of Adventures	"Stormtroopers vs. Rebels – Soldiers of the Galactic Empire"	Araiza Tokumasu Naoki (FX Animator)	Lucasfilm / Titmouse, Inc.
2019 (47th)	3Below: Tales of Arcadia	"A Glorious End Part 1"	Greg Lev, Igor Lodeiro (Visual Effects Supervisors); Chen Ling (Overseas FX Supervisor); Brandon Tyra (Compositing Supervisor)	Netflix

=== 2020s ===
Year	Program	Episode(s)	Recipient(s)	Network/Company
2020 (48th)
2020 (48th)	Jurassic World Camp Cretaceous	"Welcome to Jurassic World"	Emad Khalili, Ivan Wang, Chris Wombold, Kyle Goertz, Kathy D. Tran	Netflix
2020 (48th)	Lamp Life		Greg Gladstone, Keith Daniel Klohn, Matthew Wong	Disney+
2020 (48th)	Fast & Furious Spy Racers	"Sirocco Fire"	Chris Browne, Russell Richardson, Ardy Ala, Reggie Fourmyle, Brandon Webb	Netflix
2020 (48th)	Wizards: Tales of Arcadia	"Killahead, Part Two"	Greg Lev, Igor Lodeiro, Brandon Tyra, Cui Wei, Ma Xiao	Netflix
2020 (48th)	Transformers: War for Cybertron Trilogy	"Chapter 1: Siege"	Masanori Sakakibara	Netflix
2021 (49th)
2021 (49th)	Arcane	"Oil and Water"	Guillaume Degroote, Aurélien Ressencourt, Martin Touzé, Frédéric Macé, Jérôme Dupré	Netflix
2021 (49th)	Castlevania	"The Endings"	Tam Lu, Adam Deats, Sam Deats	Netflix
2021 (49th)	Maya and the Three	"The Sun and the Moon"	Alexander Feigin, Graham Wiebe, Pradeep Mynam, Michael Sun, Sergen Eren	Netflix
2021 (49th)	Shaun The Sheep: The Flight Before Christmas		Jim Lewis	Netflix
2021 (49th)	Trollhunters: Rise of the Titans		Greg Lev, Brandon Tyra, Prakash Dcunha, Vincent Chou, Chen Ling	Netflix
2022 (50th)
2022 (50th)	Love Death + Robots	"Bad Traveling"	Kirby Miller, Igor Zanic, Joseph H. Coleman, Steven Dupuy, Josh Schwartz	Netflix
2022 (50th)	Cars on the Road	"Road Rumblers"	Christopher Foreman, Elana Lederman, John Lockwood, Jae Jun Yi, Justin Ritter	Disney+
2022 (50th)	The House		Germán Díez, Álvaro Alonso Lomba, Hugo Vieites Caamaño	Netflix
2022 (50th)	Prehistoric Planet	"Coasts"	MPC	Apple TV+
2022 (50th)	The Boy, the Mole, the Fox and the Horse		Peter Baynton, Raymond Pang, Martial Coulon	Apple TV+
2023 (51st)
2023 (51st)	Blue Eye Samurai	"All Evil Dreams and Angry Words"	Thomas Decaens, Karl Burtin, and Laurent Bretonniere	Netflix
2023 (51st)	The Bad Guys: A Very Bad Holiday		Sateesh Malla, Russell Richardson Jr., Akash Gopal, Basavaraj P, and Kevin Rumold	Netflix
2023 (51st)	Kizazi Moto: Generation Fire	"Moremi"	Matthew Dunwoody, Dmitry Sarkisov, Podchasha Yuri Anatolyevich, Richard Bothma, and Emile Van Straaten	Disney+
2023 (51st)	Star Wars: Visions – Volume 2	"Sith"	Jonatan Catalán, Alberto Sánchez, Phoebe Arjona, Virginia Cantaro, and Rubén Hinarejos	Disney+
2023 (51st)	What If...?	"What If... Kahhori Reshaped the World?"	Ryan Barringer, Rajkumar Gurudu, Bipin Kumar Patra, and Pranil Ravindra Mahajan	Disney+
2024 (52nd)
2024 (52nd)	Arcane	"The Dirt Under Your Nails"	Guillaume Degroote, Aurélien Ressencourt, Adam Bachiri, Guillaume Zaouche, and Jérôme Dupré	Netflix
2024 (52nd)	Dream Productions	"A Night to Remember"	Gary Bruins, Jongwon Pak, Arturo Aguilar, Alan Browning, and Alen Lai	Disney+
2024 (52nd)	Secret Level	"Crossfire: Good Conflict"	Kamil Murzyn, Rafał Rumiński, Jarosław Armata, Michał Śledź, and Michał Firek	Amazon Prime Video
2024 (52nd)	Secret Level	"Dungeons & Dragons: The Queen's Cradle"	Arthur Loiseau, Tom O'Bready, Esteban Genre, Alexandre Lerouge, and Guillaume Grelier Star	Amazon Prime Video
2024 (52nd)	Secret Level	"Warhammer 40,000: And They Shall Know No Fear"	Josh Schwartz, Joe Coleman, Michael Huang, Guilherme Casagrandi, and Raul Rodrigues	Amazon Prime Video
2025 (53rd)
2025 (53rd)	Prehistoric Planet: Ice Age	"The Big Freeze"	Edward Ferrysienanda, Kevin Christensen, Guy Shuleman, Benedikt Roettger, and Kevin Tarpinian	Apple TV
2025 (53rd)	Marvel Zombies	"Episode 4"	Emma Badia, Tristan Fairclough, Jimmy Dumont, Sheng Hung, and Arth Vasavada	Disney+
2025 (53rd)	Spice Frontier	"Episode 1"	Effects Department	Steamroller Animation
2025 (53rd)	Star Wars: Visions – Volume 3	"The Bird of Paradise"	Takashi Okamoto, Kohei Yamamoto, Genyo Sasaki, Chizuru Nakamura, and Erika Matsui	Disney+
2025 (53rd)	WondLa	"Lost"	FX Team	Apple TV
