= Arcane (TV series) =

2021 animated action-adventure series

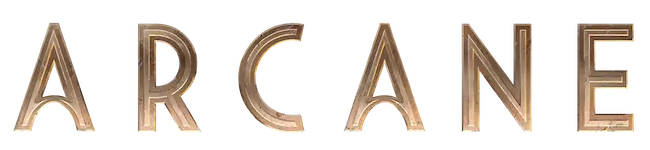
- Also known as: Arcane: League of Legends
- Genre: Action-adventure; Adult animation; Science fantasy; Steampunk
- Created by: Christian Linke; Alex Yee
- Based on: League of Legends by Riot Games
- Showrunners: Christian Linke; Alex Yee
- Directed by: Pascal Charrue; Arnaud Delord; Bart Maunoury
- Voices of: Hailee Steinfeld; Ella Purnell; Kevin Alejandro; Katie Leung; Jason Spisak; Toks Olagundoye; Harry Lloyd; JB Blanc; Reed Shannon; Mick Wingert; Amirah Vann; Ellen Thomas; Brett Tucker
- Theme music composer: Imagine Dragons; JID
- Opening theme: "Enemy"
- Composers: Alexander Temple; Alex Seaver
- Countries of origin: France; United States
- Original language: English
- No. of seasons: 2
- No. of episodes: 18

Production
- Executive producers: Christian Linke; Marc Merrill; Brandon Beck; Jane Chung; Thomas Vu
- Running time: 39–50 minutes
- Production companies: Fortiche; Riot Games
- Budget: $250 million

Original release
- Network: Netflix
- Release: November 6, 2021 – November 23, 2024

Arcane (titled onscreen as Arcane: League of Legends) is an animated steampunk, action-adventure television series created by Christian Linke and Alex Yee. It was produced by the French animation studio Fortiche, under the supervision of Riot Games, and distributed by Netflix. Set in Riot's League of Legends universe, it primarily focuses on sisters Violet / "Vi" (Hailee Steinfeld) and Powder / Jinx (Mia Sinclair Jenness and Ella Purnell) as they become embroiled in a conflict between their native underbelly of Zaun and the city of Piltover. First announced at the League of Legends tenth anniversary celebration in 2019, the series' first season was released in November 2021, and a second and final season was released in November 2024.

Arcane was met with critical acclaim, with praise for its animation, writing, worldbuilding, soundtrack, and voice acting, though the pacing of the second season saw a mixed response. Some have noted the series' appeal to both viewers who have never played League of Legends and longtime fans of the game. It was Netflix's highest-rated series within a week of its premiere, ranked first on the Netflix Top 10 Chart in 52 countries, and second on the chart in the United States. Several critics and publications have considered it to be one of the best video game adaptations ever made. The series won two Primetime Emmy Awards for Outstanding Animated Program, as well as the Annie Award for Best General Audience Animated Television Broadcast Production.

== Premise ==
Amidst the escalating unrest between the rich, utopian city of Piltover and the seedy, oppressed underbelly of Zaun, sisters Vi and Powder find themselves embroiled in a developing conflict over clashing convictions and arcane technologies.

== Voice cast and characters ==
=== Main ===
- Hailee Steinfeld as Violet / "Vi", a Zaunite orphan and Jinx's elder sister
- Ella Purnell as Powder / Jinx, a Zaunite orphan and Vi's sister
  - Mia Sinclair Jenness as young Powder
- Kevin Alejandro as Jayce Talis, a scientist, inventor, and eventual member of the Piltover council, who is responsible for the creation of Hextech
  - Faustino Duran as young Jayce Talis
- Katie Leung as Caitlyn Kiramman, a Piltover enforcer and Jayce's former lab assistant, who becomes Vi's love interest
  - Molly Harris as young Caitlyn Kiramman
- Jason Spisak as Silco, a crime lord based in Zaun, Jinx's second adoptive father, and leader of the Chem-Barons
- Toks Olagundoye as Mel Medarda, a member of the Piltover council who takes an interest in Jayce and Viktor's experiments, and later begins a relationship with the former. She is the disowned heir of Ambessa Medarda and becomes entangled in a conspiracy with the Black Rose.
  - Imogen Faires as young Mel Medarda
- Harry Lloyd as Viktor, Jayce's research partner and former assistant to Cecil B. Heimerdinger, who helped Jayce in the creation of Hextech. He grows to become obsessed with using magic to perfect humanity, partly due to his physical disabilities. Viktor is originally from Zaun, but lives in Piltover.
  - Edan Hayhurst as young Viktor
- JB Blanc as Vander, Silco's former brother-in-arms who took part in a rebellion that led to the death of Vi and Jinx's parents, leading him to adopt both of them. He is also the owner of The Last Drop bar. In the second season, he is turned into a wolf-like beast named Warwick by Singed.
  - Blanc also voices Irius Bolbok (season 1), a member of the Piltover council
- Reed Shannon as Ekko, a childhood friend of Vi and Jinx, and the leader of the revolutionary Zaunite group, the Firelights
  - Miles Brown as young Ekko
- Mick Wingert as Cecil B. Heimerdinger, a founder of Piltover and leader of the city's council who mentors Jayce, Viktor, and later Ekko
  - Wingert also voices Heenot (season 2), an accountant who works for the Chem-Barons
- Amirah Vann as Sevika, Silco's right-hand woman and chief enforcer
- Ellen Thomas as Ambessa Medarda, Mel's mother and a respected but brutal war general from Noxus who seeks to use Hextech weapons against the Black Rose
- Brett Tucker as Dr. Corin Reveck / Singed, Viktor's former mentor, and the chief scientist for Silco and later Ambessa, who performs unethical experiments in an effort to realize immortality and save his cryopreserved daughter

=== Recurring ===
- Shohreh Aghdashloo as Grayson (season 1), the original sheriff of Piltover
- Remy Hii as:
  - Marcus (season 1), the sheriff of Piltover who is secretly a corrupt enforcer working for Silco
  - Tobias Kiramman, Caitlyn's father
- Josh Keaton as:
  - Deckard (season 1), a Zaunite thug who works for Silco
  - Allira Salo, a member of the Piltover council with selfish interests
- Bill Lobley as Huck, a resident of Zaun who becomes addicted to shimmer
- Yuri Lowenthal as Mylo, Vi and Jinx's arrogant adoptive brother
- Roger Craig Smith as Claggor, Vi and Jinx's strong adoptive brother
- Fred Tatasciore as Benzo, Ekko's adoptive father, Vander's friend, and a pawn shop owner
- Mara Junot as Shoola, a member of the Piltover council
- Erica Lindbeck as Elora, Mel's assistant
- Abigail Marlowe as:
  - Cassandra Kiramman, Caitlyn's mother and a member of the Piltover council
  - Renni, a Chem-Baron who runs several chemical facilities
- Dave B. Mitchell as Torman Hoskel (season 1), a member of the Piltover council
- Kimberly Brooks as:
  - Sky Young, Viktor's assistant who has an unrequited crush on him
  - Margot (season 2; mute in season 1), a Chem-Baron who provides prostitution services
- Miyavi as Finn (season 1), a Chem-Baron who supplies weaponry and seeks to usurp Silco
- Stewart Scudamore as Rictus (season 2; mute in season 1), Ambessa's bodyguard
- Earl Baylon as Loris (season 2), a Piltover enforcer who befriends Vi and joins Caitlyn's strike team
- Katy Townsend as Maddie Nolen (season 2), a Piltover enforcer who befriends Caitlyn and joins her strike team
- Lucy Lowe as Isha (season 2), a Zaunite orphan adopted by Jinx
- Ashley Holliday as Gert (season 2), a prominent member of the Jinxers resistance group
- Minnie Driver as LeBlanc / the Illusionary Sorceress (season 2), the leader of the Black Rose who is at odds with Ambessa

=== Guest ===
- Imagine Dragons as The Last Drop's band (season 1)
- JID as The Last Drop's rapper (season 1)
- Ray Chen as an orchestra concert soloist (season 1)
- Krizia Bajos as Ximena Talis (season 1; mute in season 2), Jayce's mother who was rescued by a mysterious wizard in her past
- Mira Furlan as Babette (season 1; mute in season 2), the madame of a brothel in Zaun
- Salli Saffioti as Amara, a member of Piltover's merchant guild who is secretly a member of the Black Rose
- Robbie Daymond as Scar (season 2; mute in season 1), Ekko's right-hand man and second-in-command of the Firelights
- Lenny Citrano as Smeech (season 2; mute in season 1), a Chem-Baron who sells cybernetic enhancements
- Lex Lang as Chross (season 2; mute in season 1), an elderly Chem-Baron who runs a network of informants
- Eve Lindley as Lest (season 2), a healer working for Salo who also spies on him for Mel
- Keston John as Kino Medarda (season 2), Mel's deceased older brother
- Jeannie Tirado as Felicia (season 2), Vi and Jinx's deceased mother

The League of Legends character Orianna also appears in the second season, as well as recurring character Steb, both of whom do not have a credited voice actor.

== Episodes ==
Season	Episodes	Originally released	
Season	Episodes	First released	Last released
1	9	November 6, 2021	November 20, 2021
2	9	November 9, 2024	November 23, 2024

=== Season 1 (2021) ===
No. overall	No. in season	Title	Directed by	Written by	Original release date
Act 1
1	1	"Welcome to the Playground"	Pascal Charrue & Arnaud Delord	Christian Linke & Alex Yee	November 6, 2021
Zaunite sisters Vi and Powder find their parents dead in the aftermath of a battle on the Bridge of Progress. They are taken in by Vander, the leader of the failed rebellion. Years later, Vi, Powder, and their adopted brothers, Mylo and Claggor, break into a Piltover penthouse. Powder steals a set of magical crystals but accidentally shatters one, causing an explosion that destroys part of the building. Fleeing back to Zaun, the siblings encounter Deckard and his thugs; while they beat them in a fistfight, Powder is chased and loses the loot. Vander, now a respected community leader in Zaun, reprimands the children for their carelessness and attempts to resolve matters with Grayson, Sheriff of Piltover's enforcers, and her subordinate Marcus. Vi berates Mylo for calling Powder a "jinx" and consoles her sister. Somewhere in Zaun, crime lord Silco extracts information from Deckard and works with the scientist Singed to test a volatile mutagen, shimmer, on a rat.
2	2	"Some Mysteries Are Better Left Unsolved"	Pascal Charrue & Arnaud Delord	Nick Luddington	November 6, 2021
The stolen crystals are revealed to belong to Jayce Talis, a student at Piltover's academy. Piltover's ruling council has him testify about his unsanctioned experiments; Jayce recounts how arcane magic saved his life as a child and believes it can revolutionize Piltover. However, the academy expels him when he reveals the magical nature of the experiments, and his research is ordered destroyed. On the verge of suicide, his beliefs are renewed when Viktor, the assistant of Professor Heimerdinger, offers to help him. In Zaun, Marcus pressures Vander to reveal the true culprits of the robbery, while the Zaunites pressure him to fight back against the enforcers. To protect the children, Vander remains neutral, causing some to question his leadership. Vi decides to turn herself in. Elsewhere, Silco manipulates Deckard into swallowing a vial of shimmer.
3	3	"The Base Violence Necessary for Change"	Pascal Charrue & Arnaud Delord	Ash Brannon	November 6, 2021
Vander stops Vi and offers himself to Grayson instead. Silco intervenes and captures Vander after a heavily mutated Deckard massacres Grayson and her men, sparing only Marcus. Vi, Mylo, and Claggor set out on a rescue mission, leaving Powder behind. In Piltover, Jayce and Viktor secretly experiment with the crystals under the discretion of councilor Mel Medarda and eventually invent Hextech. A flashback reveals that Vander once betrayed Silco and attempted to drown him. In Zaun, the siblings reach Vander but are cut off by Silco. Vi fights off Silco's thugs but is badly beaten by Deckard. Desperate to help, Powder causes an explosion with the stolen crystals, accidentally killing Mylo and Claggor. A wounded Vander takes shimmer to kill Deckard and save Vi but sacrifices himself in the process. After learning Powder was responsible for the explosion, Vi lashes out, striking her and calling her a "jinx" before walking away. Feeling guilty, she attempts to return but is ambushed and captured by Marcus. Silco embraces the distraught Powder and assures her, “We'll show them all".
Act 2
4	4	"Happy Progress Day!"	Pascal Charrue & Arnaud Delord	David Dunne	November 13, 2021
Several years later, Piltover prospers with Jayce's Hextech technology and celebrates its 200th anniversary on Progress Day. Jayce initially plans to unveil a gemstone-powered device he and Viktor developed but decides against it after Heimerdinger warns of its potential dangers. Powder, now an unstable teenager going by Jinx, smuggles shimmer for Silco, whom she sees as a surrogate father. During one operation, the Firelights, a rivaling Zaunite gang, interfere; Jinx mistakes a Firelight for Vi and has a violent breakdown. Caitlyn, an enforcer and Jayce's childhood friend, investigates the incident. Hoping to regain Silco's approval, Jinx steals Jayce's gemstone and triggers an explosion that kills six enforcers. In response, Jayce is granted a seat on Piltover's council to help protect the city. Seeking answers, Caitlyn travels to Stillwater Prison and encounters Vi, now an adult, imprisoned by Marcus.
5	5	"Everybody Wants to Be My Enemy"	Pascal Charrue & Arnaud Delord	Amanda Overton	November 13, 2021
Caitlyn releases Vi from prison to assist her in tracking down Silco. Marcus secretly works with Silco to facilitate shimmer smuggling while framing the Firelights for the Progress Day bombing. Still traumatized by her family's deaths, Jinx refuses to work on the gemstone. In response, Silco brings her to the river where Vander once tried to drown him and performs a symbolic "baptism" to convince her to embrace being Jinx. In Piltover, Mel begins a romantic relationship with Jayce while helping him navigate the political landscape he now finds himself in as a councilor. Viktor grows increasingly desperate to cure his worsening illness through Hextech. Vi tracks down Sevika, Silco's second-in-command, who reveals Jinx's allegiance to Silco. Distracted, Vi is stabbed by Sevika but is saved by Caitlyn, allowing them to escape. Jinx successfully refines the gemstone and constructs a device similar to Jayce's to harness its power. Sevika reports Vi's return to Silco.
6	6	"When These Walls Come Tumbling Down"	Pascal Charrue & Arnaud Delord	Alex Yee	November 13, 2021
After Viktor collapses in the lab, he and Jayce begin to study the "Hexcore", a revolutionary Hextech device capable of interacting with organic matter and potentially curing diseases. Heimerdinger deems it too dangerous and orders it destroyed, prompting Jayce to orchestrate his removal from the council. Alone, Viktor seeks out Singed, his former mentor, for help in perfecting the Hexcore. Silco orders Marcus to kill Vi and Caitlyn before they can return to Piltover. Jayce orders a bridge blockade for Piltover's protection. Jinx interrogates Sevika and learns of Vi's return. Vi and Caitlyn take refuge in a safehouse as Vi recovers from her fight with Sevika, but Silco locates them after bribing local addicts with shimmer. After escaping, the pair spot a blue flare—one Vi gave Jinx before their ill-fated mission to rescue Vander. The sisters reunite, but Caitlyn's presence triggers Jinx's mistrust. The Firelights then intervene, steal the gemstone, and abduct Caitlyn and Vi, leaving Jinx behind, screaming in anguish.
Act 3
7	7	"The Boy Savior"	Pascal Charrue & Arnaud Delord	Nick Luddington	November 20, 2021
The Firelights' leader is revealed to be Ekko, Vi and Powder's childhood friend. After Vander's death, Silco seized control of Zaun and made the populace dependent on shimmer; the Firelights have been leading efforts to thwart him and rehabilitate addicts. Ekko warns Vi that the Powder they knew is gone and only Jinx remains, though Vi refuses to believe him. Singed provides Viktor with a variant of shimmer to enable the Hexcore to modify his deteriorating body, which Viktor hides from Jayce after the latter unintentionally insults his Zaun origins. Jayce's blockade fuels tensions between the two cities. Caitlyn convinces Ekko to return the gemstone to Piltover while Vi leaves to find Jinx. At the blockade, Marcus stops Ekko and Caitlyn and prepares to kill the latter after shooting Ekko. Seeing this, Vi runs back to help, but Jinx, envious of Caitlyn, unleashes explosives which kill Marcus and his enforcers. Ekko fights Jinx as Vi and an injured Caitlyn flee to Piltover. Ekko nearly defeats Jinx but hesitates to deliver the final blow, allowing her to detonate an explosive near them.
8	8	"Oil and Water"	Pascal Charrue & Arnaud Delord	Ben St. John & Mollie St. John	November 20, 2021
Silco finds a heavily injured Jinx in the aftermath of the explosion and realizes she has recovered the gemstone. He brings her to Singed for treatment, during which Jinx hallucinates that Vi and Caitlyn are the ones operating the painful procedure. Singed injects Jinx with shimmer, causing her eyes to glow purple. Ambessa, Mel's mother and a Noxian warlord, arrives in Piltover after the assassination of Mel's brother to prepare her for the brewing war with Zaun. Heimerdinger, now exiled, meets an injured Ekko. Viktor succeeds in healing his body through the Hexcore and is able to run for the first time, but further experimentation accidentally kills his assistant and childhood friend, Sky. Frustrated by the council's inaction against Silco, Vi leaves Caitlyn and partners with Jayce to dismantle Silco's shimmer factories. Armed with Hextech weapons, they defeat shimmer-enhanced soldiers, but Jayce accidentally kills a child worker during the fight. Caitlyn is kidnapped by Jinx.
9	9	"The Monster You Created"	Pascal Charrue & Arnaud Delord	Christian Linke & Alex Yee	November 20, 2021
The death of the child, son of chem-baroness Renni, forces Jayce to realize the potential cost of a war between Piltover and Zaun. He brokers a peace treaty with Silco, offering Zaun's independence in exchange for Jinx. Ekko reveals the Firelights' hideout to Heimerdinger. Stricken with guilt over Sky's death, Viktor has Jayce promise to destroy the Hexcore. Silco laments choosing between Zaun's freedom and Jinx, who overhears him. After beating Sevika in a fight, Vi is abducted by Jinx and awakens restrained alongside Caitlyn and Silco in the warehouse where Vander died. Jinx hands Vi a pistol and forces her to choose between Caitlyn and herself. Vi refuses and instead appeals to their childhood, causing Jinx to suffer a traumatic breakdown. Silco breaks free and fires at Vi, but misses. Jinx inadvertently shoots him, and with his dying breath, Silco reaffirms his fatherly love for her. Devastated, Jinx finally embraces her new identity. She weaponizes the gemstone into a rocket launcher and fires at the Piltover council just as they approve Zaun's independence.

=== Season 2 (2024) ===
No. overall	No. in season	Title	Directed by	Written by	Original release date
Act 1
10	1	"Heavy Is the Crown"	Arnaud Delord, Bart Maunoury, Pascal Charrue, Etienne Mattera	Amanda Overton	November 9, 2024
Jayce and Mel survive Jinx's rocket assault alongside councilors Shoola and Salo, while the remainder of the Council—including Cassandra, Caitlyn's mother—are killed. Salo is left crippled and Viktor is gravely wounded, prompting Jayce to renege on his promise to destroy the Hexcore and instead fuse it with Viktor to save his life. Ambessa pushes the Council toward military retaliation against Zaun, though Mel opposes the use of Hextech weaponry. Vi declines Caitlyn's offer to join the enforcers but attends a memorial for the fallen councilors. The event is ambushed by Renni and her followers in revenge for Jayce killing her son; the enforcers are unable to hold them back until Ambessa and her Noxian forces arrive, killing the attackers. Salo calls for all-out war with Zaun. Proposing an alternative strategy, Caitlyn forms a specialized unit armed with Jayce's Hextech weapons, led by herself, Vi, and enforcers Maddie, Lorris, and Steb, to capture Jinx, eliminate the remaining Chem-Barons, and shut down shimmer production at its source.
11	2	"Watch It All Burn"	Arnaud Delord, Bart Maunoury, Marietta Ren	Nick Luddington	November 9, 2024
Following Silco and Renni's deaths, the Chem-Barons clash for power over Zaun despite Sevika's calls for unity. Smeech, one of the Barons, proposes surrendering Jinx to Piltover to end hostilities, but Sevika refuses. Elsewhere, Caitlyn's team raids Jinx's hideout, forcing her to flee. During her escape, Jinx rescues a young orphan named Isha from her attackers. Later, Smeech is killed by the two and Sevika after a failed assassination attempt on Jinx. In Piltover, Viktor awakes from his coma and, realizing Jayce broke his promise, parts ways with him. Returning to Zaun, he finds that the Hexcore has given him magical abilities after he heals Huck, a shimmer addict, and inspires a cult-like following. Meanwhile, the Firelights' tree, vital for their sustenance, begins to show signs of magical corruption, prompting Ekko and Heimerdinger to infiltrate the Academy and consult Jayce.
12	3	"Finally Got the Name Right"	Arnaud Delord, Bart Maunoury, Christelle Abgrall	Henry Jones	November 9, 2024
As Caitlyn's task force continues their mission, Vi grows concerned by her aggression. Ambessa thwarts an assassination attempt on herself by the Black Rose, a cabal of Noxian sorcerers, prompting them to abduct Mel. Meanwhile, Jayce brings Ekko and Heimerdinger to the Hex Vault, where Piltover's Hextech is managed, and they discover a volatile arcane anomaly dubbed a "wild rune". Vi convinces Caitlyn to break from the task force and pursue Jinx alone. They are ambushed by Jinx and Sevika; in the skirmish, Vi stops Caitlyn from executing Jinx when Isha intercedes. The three escape and trigger an explosion that ruptures Zaun's air ducts, unleashing toxic gases into Piltover. As a result, Caitlyn severs ties with Vi, and Ambessa convinces the Piltovans to declare martial law, positioning Caitlyn as commander-in-chief—unaware that Ambessa herself orchestrated the memorial attack. Elsewhere, Singed is revealed to have created a human-wolf hybrid.
Act 2
13	4	"Paint the Town Blue"	Arnaud Delord, Bart Maunoury, Marietta Ren	Graham McNeill	November 16, 2024
Some time after the declaration of martial law, a joint Piltovan-Noxian force occupies Zaun, Jinx has gone into hiding with Isha, Caitlyn has entered a relationship with Maddie, and Jayce, Ekko, and Heimerdinger remain missing since their encounter with the wild rune. Caitlyn grows suspicious of Ambessa, who has been secretly conducting Hextech research aimed at combating the Black Rose, albeit to no success. Sevika spurs Jinx, who is revered by the Zaunites as a hero, to lead a revolt. Although Jinx refuses, Isha is captured during a rally by enforcers led by Ambessa's lieutenant, Rictus, prompting her and Sevika to infiltrate Stillwater Hold to rescue her. Singed is also detained but leaves a blood trail for his human-wolf hybrid to follow. The creature breaks into the prison and slaughters guards and inmates alike before encountering Jinx and Sevika; Jinx engages the creature while Sevika escapes with Isha, but is eventually overpowered. As the creature prepares to kill her, it hesitates upon recognizing her as Powder.
14	5	"Blisters and Bedrock"	Arnaud Delord, Bart Maunoury	Kristina Felske, Giovanna Sarquis	November 16, 2024
Recognizing the creature as Vander, Jinx seeks out Vi, who has become a pit fighter after her fallout with Caitlyn, and brings her to an abandoned mine, where the creature initially attacks them before ultimately recognizing them. Meanwhile, Ambessa enlists Singed to track Vander. Caitlyn identifies Singed as Corin Reveck, a disgraced Piltovan academic whose experiments aim to cure his comatose daughter Orianna. Elsewhere, Mel is imprisoned by a shadowed Black Rose sorceress and reunites with her brother Kino, who is believed to be dead. She learns that Ambessa's illegitimate child is the true target of her captors before realizing Kino is an illusion, and unleashes her latent magical abilities. At the Hex Vault, Jayce escapes the wild rune and encounters Salo, recently healed by Viktor, while retrieving a Hexgate core. Traumatized by the experience, Jayce vows to destroy Hextech and kills Salo.
15	6	"The Message Hidden Within the Pattern"	Arnaud Delord, Bart Maunoury	Alex Yee	November 16, 2024
Viktor, accompanied by Sky's spirit, investigates the wild rune phenomenon after witnessing Salo's murder. Jinx, Vi, and Isha bring Vander to Viktor's sanctuary in hopes for a recovery. Over several days, Viktor gradually restores Vander's humanity. Meanwhile, with Singed's help, Ambessa and Caitlyn track Vander to the sanctuary. Singed attempts to persuade Viktor to surrender Vander, but Viktor refuses, recognizing Singed's true motive is to save his daughter. While following Singed back to a Noxian camp, Vi is captured by Caitlyn. Ambessa orders Caitlyn and Singed to undo Viktor's work, but Vi and Caitlyn reveal themselves to be allied; together, they subdue Ambessa and Singed. Haunted by his experience in the wild rune, Jayce infiltrates the sanctuary and kills Viktor, triggering a violent backlash from those Viktor healed, including Vander, who becomes uncontrollably savage and kills Rictus. Ambessa and her forces attack the sanctuary; in an act of sacrifice, Isha overloads Jinx's pistol with Hextech gems to destroy Vander and several Noxian soldiers, leaving Jinx devastated.
Act 3
16	7	"Pretend Like It's the First Time"	Arnaud Delord, Bart Maunoury	Amanda Overton	November 23, 2024
Following their encounter with the wild rune, Ekko and Heimerdinger find themselves in a parallel universe where Hextech was never invented, Mylo, Claggor, and Benzo are still alive, and Vander and Silco are on good terms, though Vi died during Jayce's apartment robbery. To return home, the two work with this universe's Powder, who never became Jinx, to recreate the wild rune and channel it into a time-reversal device. During this time, Ekko falls in love with Powder but ultimately decides to return to his own universe. Despite the device proving unstable, Heimerdinger successfully returns Ekko at the cost of vanishing himself, his fate unknown. Meanwhile, Jayce is transported to a post-apocalyptic future where Hextech has destroyed Piltover and reunites with the hooded mage who saved him as a child. Learning this future is a result of Viktor's actions, Jayce promises to stop him before being sent back by the mage, leading to the events at the sanctuary.
17	8	"Killing Is a Cycle"	Arnaud Delord, Bart Maunoury	Alex Yee, Amanda Overton	November 23, 2024
Following the sanctuary attack, Jinx is arrested and Singed uses Vander's remains to save Viktor. Vi confronts Caitlyn, who then visits Jinx and admits her exhaustion with hatred; Jinx responds that she was unaware of Cassandra's presence during the rocket strike. Now fully awakened to her magical abilities, Mel escapes the prison and reunites with Jayce, revealing she had shielded him during Jinx's rocket assault, but Jayce accuses her of manipulating both Viktor and himself. An emissary from Viktor arrives to request access to the Hexgate anomaly for the completion of Viktor's transformation. Spurned, Viktor allies with Ambessa to launch an attack on Piltover. Meanwhile, Singed destroys what remains of Vander to fully restore Viktor. Vi releases Jinx, who then imprisons her, stating that Vi deserves peace. Caitlyn later releases Vi and reveals she had anticipated Jinx's release, and the two have sex. As Ambessa reveals Viktor's amassed forces, Jayce calls for Piltover to prepare its defense.
18	9	"The Dirt Under Your Nails"	Arnaud Delord, Bart Maunoury	Alex Yee, Christian Linke	November 23, 2024
As Noxian forces attack, Piltover's defenders hold the line as Jayce dismantles the Hex Vault. However, Maddie, revealed to be a spy, sabotages the mission. Reinforcements arrive from Zaun, led by Jinx, who had been dissuaded from suicide by Ekko, but the attack is revealed to be a diversion while Viktor infiltrates the Vault. Vander, now fully stripped of his humanity, engages Vi and Jinx. Meanwhile, Mel kills Maddie and Caitlyn disarms Ambessa's magical protection, triggering the arrival of the Black Rose sorceress, who kills Ambessa. Viktor gains control of the wild rune and subdues nearly all opposition except for Ekko, who disrupts the rune's influence using his time-reversal device and frees Jayce. Jayce convinces Viktor to abandon his plan by revealing his encounter with the hooded mage, revealed to be Viktor's remorseful future self. Together, they destroy the wild rune, freeing everyone from its control, but vanish in the process. Vander however, remains feral, and attacks Vi, forcing Jinx to seemingly sacrifice herself to save her sister. In the aftermath, Sevika joins the Council as Zaun's representative, Mel departs for Noxus, Singed partially cures his daughter, and Vi and Caitlyn ponder their future.

== Production ==
Arcane's production differed from standard industry practice. The idea for the series first came from Christian Linke in 2015 after Riot had initially delved into other media to help strengthen the connections players had with the IP such as cinematic trailers and music videos. But at that point, none of the promotional content had any dialogue. Next, instead of finding a new animation studio that specialized in television animation, Riot decided to continue their partnership with Fortiche; who had produced music videos for them. Riot also targeted the "adult-minded" animation market instead of more established markets for video game to television animation adaptations.

Arcane was first announced at the League of Legends 10th anniversary celebration in 2019, and is set in Riot's League of Legends fictional universe. In September 2021, it was announced that Hailee Steinfeld, Ella Purnell, Kevin Alejandro, Katie Leung, Jason Spisak, Toks Olagundoye, JB Blanc and Harry Lloyd had joined the voice cast.

Riot Games CEO Nicolo Laurent has stated it took six years to develop the first season of Arcane.

On November 20, 2021, following the conclusion of Arcane's first season, Riot Games and Netflix announced that a second season was in production for a planned post-2022 release. In June 2024, it was announced that the second season would be the series' last; the season debuted on November 9, 2024, and concluded along with the series on November 23. The combined budget for both seasons is reported to be $250 million. Riot Games co-founder Mark Merrill contested this amount, stating that "the $250 million headline is not even accurate because that includes marketing expenses. The actual creation budget is significantly less than that...I'll give you a ballpark range. It's somewhere between 60 to 75% of that estimate."

== Broadcast ==
=== Marketing ===
Riot Games promoted the launch of Arcane through events in their games, including League of Legends, Legends of Runeterra, Teamfight Tactics, League of Legends: Wild Rift, and Valorant as "RiotX Arcane". It also launched promotional collaborations with non-Riot games such as PUBG Mobile, Fortnite, and Among Us.

On November 6, 2021, for the global premiere of the series, Riot Games streamed the first episode on Twitch. Some content creators were allowed to co-stream the first three episodes of the series once they received permission from Riot Games, a first for a Netflix series, which also allowed viewers to retrieve in-game drops during the premiere. Drops were only included in the games League of Legends (Arcane Capsule), Wild Rift ("A Single Tear" Emote), Teamfight Tactics (Gizmos & Gadgets Little Legends Egg), Legends of Runeterra ("Fascinating" Emote), and Valorant ("Fishbones" Gun Buddy). The premiere was watched by a concurrent 1.8 million viewers on Twitch. On November 21, Netflix and Riot Games announced a partnership with Secret Cinema for an in-person Arcane experience in Los Angeles, California.

=== Release ===
Originally set for a 2020 release, the show's first season was delayed for release in 2021 due to the COVID-19 pandemic. It was scheduled for a simultaneous November 6, 2021 release on Netflix and China's Tencent Video, with the series broken into nine episodes, and with three episode "acts" being released once a week over three weeks. The same release format was used for the second and final season.

=== Leaks ===
On August 9, 2024, Netflix stated that one of its post-production vendors had been compromised, which led to a number of episodes from several Netflix titles, including three episodes from the second season of Arcane, being leaked online. The leaks have been described as "the worst anime leak of all time" by some media outlets. It was later reported that the company Iyuno was the source of the security breach. Netflix later issued a statement, saying it would take action against those responsible for the leaks. On November 21, the United States District Court for the Northern District of California issued a subpoena, ordering Discord to provide information of the user that claimed responsibility for the leaks.

=== Home media ===
In June 2024, it was announced that GKIDS had acquired the home video rights to Arcane. The digital copy of the first season was released on September 24, 2024, followed by the 4K Blu-ray edition on October 8, 2024.

In February 2025, it was announced the second and final season would be released on 4K Blu-ray by GKIDS in 2025.

=== Soundtrack ===
On November 20, 2021, songs from the first season were released on Amazon Music. The series had a different opening theme in China, it being "孤勇者 (Lonely Warrior)", performed by Eason Chan. The soundtrack of the second season was released on November 23, 2024.

== Reception ==
=== Critical reception ===
Critical response of Arcane
Season	Rotten Tomatoes	Metacritic
1	100% (30 reviews)	—N/a
2	100% (35 reviews)	86 (7 reviews)

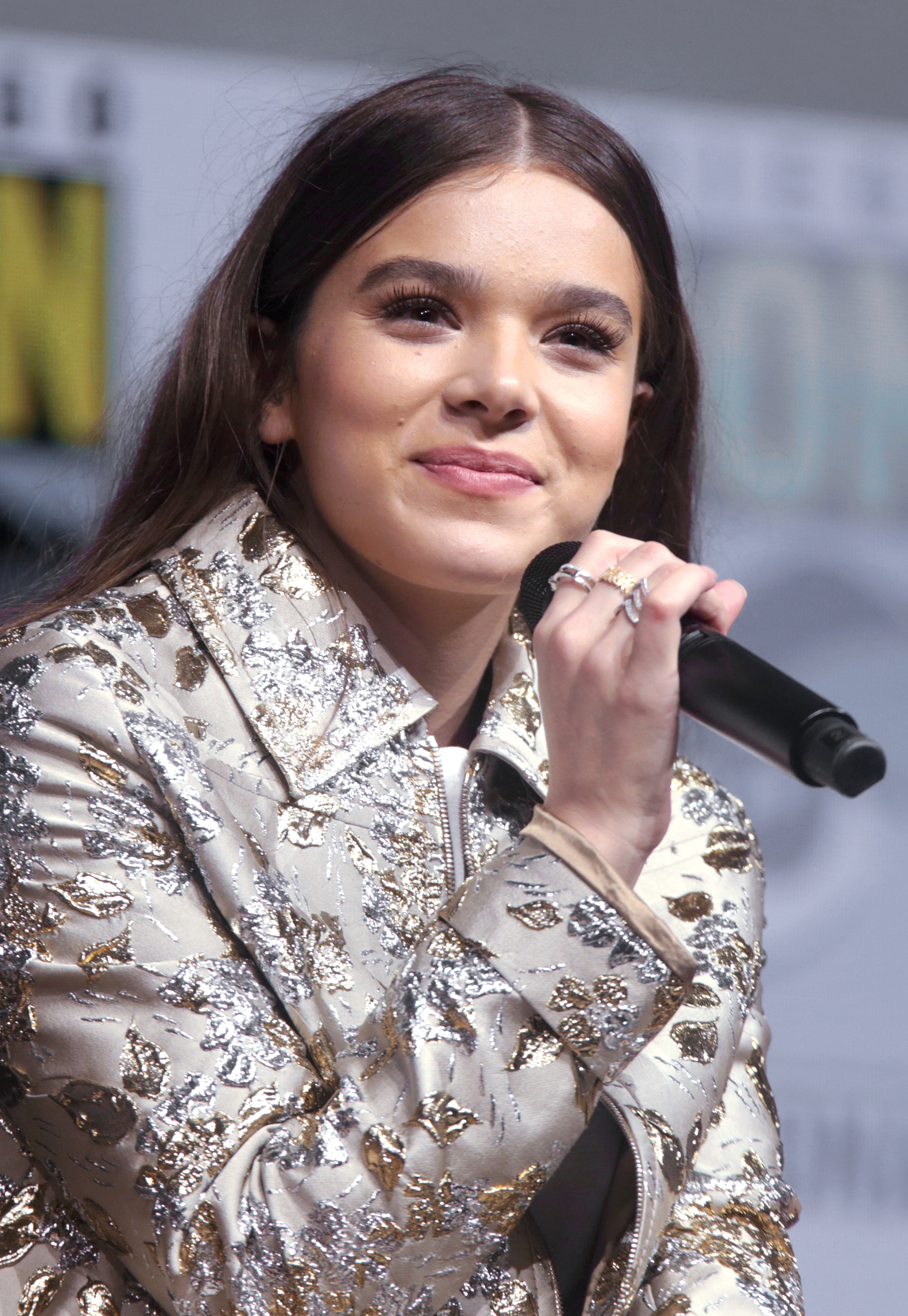
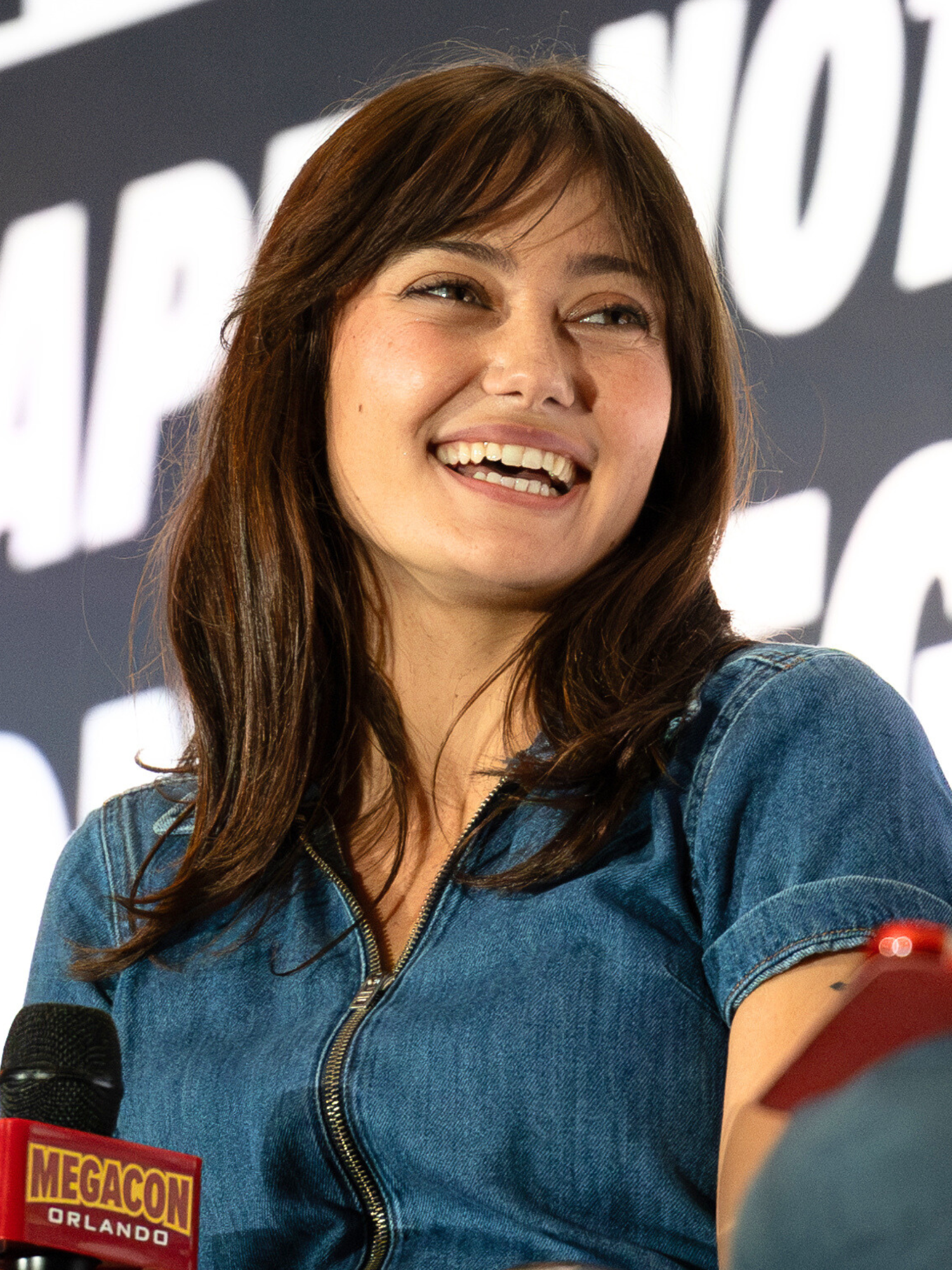
The performances of Hailee Steinfeld (top) and Ella Purnell (bottom), voice actors for Vi and Jinx, respectively, received praise.

==== Season 1 ====
On review aggregator website Rotten Tomatoes, Arcane's first season has a 100% approval rating, with an average rating of 9.20/10, based on 30 reviews. The site's critical consensus reads, "Arcane makes an arresting first impression, combining a spectacular mix of 2D and 3D animation with an emotionally compelling story to deliver a video game adaptation that could become legendary." The series also became Netflix's number-one show in November 2021, setting the record as Netflix's highest-rated series so far within a week of its premiere, ranked first on the Netflix Top 10 Chart in 52 countries, and ranked second on the chart in the United States.

Writing for IGN, Rafael Motamayor called the first season of Arcane a "classic in the making, and the nail in the coffin of the so-called video game curse." He noted that the show worked for fans of League of Legends and newcomers alike, stating that "the character stories are what keep you engaged episode after episode; the lore is just icing on the cake." He also praised the voice cast, highlighting the performances of Leung, Purnell, Aghdashloo and Steinfeld, calling the latter performance the show's standout. Praising the animation, Motamayor called it the "most stunning piece of animation since Spider-Man: Into the Spider-Verse" and compared it to Invincible in terms of episode structure. He concluded by saying that Arcane "delivers a killing blow to the idea that video games cannot be masterfully adapted... with compelling characters, an endearing story, and fascinating lore and worldbuilding, as well as striking visuals," calling it a "once-in-a-generation masterpiece" and giving it a 10 out of 10 rating.

Andrew Webster of The Verge praised the "fantasy-meets-steampunk world" and how no knowledge of League was needed to understand the show. Despite calling Act 1 "a fairly typical fantasy tale" he lauded the animation, saying that "each frame looks like a gorgeous piece of hand-painted concept art; in motion, it's like nothing I've ever seen" and that "it's also a world that feels lived-in and fully realized." Matt Cabral of Common Sense Media called the first season "visually stunning" and that it "features the sort of nuanced characterizations, thoughtful storytelling, and rich worldbuilding typically associated with big-budget, big-screen epics." He also took note of the blend of fantasy, steampunk and sci-fi with emphasis on how the story puts a "fresh spin on the heavily recycled premise." Cabral concluded that viewers didn't need to have played League to appreciate the show.

Reviewing the first four episodes of the first season, Tara Bennett of Paste enjoyed the way that "[the creators] purposefully made an adult animated drama that unflinchingly utilizes violence, adult language, and very dark storylines when needed to make the lives of the large ensemble cast resonate." Bennett favorably compared the series to Game of Thrones, Shadow and Bone, Castlevania and BioShock. She was also positive about the "nuance and subtle facial movements" of Fortiche's animation combined with the performances of Steinfeld, Jenness, Purnell and Spisak. Bennett called "Enemy" by Imagine Dragons "infectious" and that the show is "the new benchmark for what can be done when it comes to successfully translating worthy videogame universes into a different medium."

Many publications have considered the series to be one of the best video game adaptations of all time.

==== Season 2 ====
On Rotten Tomatoes, the second season has a rating of 100% based on 35 reviews, with an average rating of 8.90/10. The site's critical consensus reads, "Expansive in scope while hurtling towards the endgame at a rollicking pace, Arcane's second and final season is a supremely satisfying capper to an epic saga." Review aggregator Metacritic, which uses a weighted average, assigned the second season a score of 86 out of 100 based on seven critics, indicating "universal acclaim".

While the reception for the season was mostly positive, the show's pacing and narrative choices faced some scrutiny. In a more critical review for Reactor magazine, Kathryn Porter wrote that "With Fortiche at the helm of the animation, Arcane will always look incredible no matter how good or bad the writing is," but that although "everyone lands where they are supposed to by the time the series concludes... it is how they reach those conclusions that feels a little hollow in the wake of a far superior first season". Rafeal Motamayor of IGN heavily praised the first two acts of the season, but was more critical towards Act III, saying, "It retroactively makes the entire second season feel lacking, because what's set up in previous episodes is either ignored or ends up amounting to very little." Erik Kain also criticized the season's pacing, criticizing Act I for its dialogue and the lack of Silco in the narrative, and describing Act II as "narrative whiplash". Kain would describe Act III as "gorgeous to behold" but criticized the rushed nature of the act and finale, especially in regards to Jinx and Vi's character arcs, describing their conflict as being resolved with "barely an inconvenience". Angelo Delos Trinos of Comic Book Resources also noted pacing issues in his critical review of the season, taking aim at the loss in sociopolitical commentary through the season's choice to have Zaun and Piltover against a common threat in the form of Noxus, stating the path of "least resistance" resulted in the season being "odd and disappointing". The character of Caitlyn Kiramman was a point of contention for the season, with Jacob Slankard of Collider criticizing the lack of commentary for Caitlyn's decision to hit Vi which he labelled as "thoughtless domestic violence", stating that "it's too quickly resolved by lip service to the notion of who does and doesn't get a second chance, with no true confrontation about how their relationship will be repaired moving forward". Laura Pollaco of The Mary Sue attributed issues with Caitlyn's redemption arc as due to the season's pacing, elaborating that "Caitlyn's descent into fascism before bouncing back was fast, and Vi's ability to trust her again was even faster."

==== LGBTQ representation ====
A central part of the plot was the lesbian romance between Violet and Caitlyn. Writer Amanda Overton stated that they were the main couple "from the very beginning," but that the lack of an on-screen kiss in the first season led to accusations of queerbaiting. Vi and Caitlyn consummate their relationship in the second season with an on-screen sex scene, which won an Annie Award for Storyboarding. Co-creator Christian Linke claimed that there was an extended version of the scene that was edited down, leading to a petition calling for its release. Storyboarder Joséphine Meis stated that there was no extended version of the scene in existence. According to Variety, the love scene was the most-captured scene in Netflix history. Jacob Slankard of Collider took issue with certain moments between the two, specifically with Caitlyn hitting Vi which he regarded as lesbian domestic violence and as a detriment to what was otherwise a great depiction of a queer relationship.

=== Accolades ===
Arcane became the first streaming television series based on a video game, as well as the first video game adaptation overall to win both Annie Awards and Primetime Emmy Awards, as the former became the first streaming series to both win the most awards from the same nominations in a single year, and to sweep the Annies with nine, while the latter won Outstanding Animated Program, becoming the first Netflix series to do so. Arcane also won the inaugural category Best Adaptation (awarded to media based on video games) at The Game Awards 2022.

Award	Date of ceremony	Category	Nominee(s)	Result	Ref.
American Music Awards	May 26, 2025	Favorite Soundtrack	Arcane League of Legends: Season 2	Won	
Annecy International Animated Film Festival	June 18, 2022	Best Television Production	"When These Walls Come Tumbling Down"	Nominated	
Annie Awards	March 12, 2022	Best General Audience Animated Television/Broadcast Production	"When These Walls Come Tumbling Down"	Won	
Annie Awards	March 12, 2022	Outstanding Achievement for Animated Effects in an Animated Television/Broadcast Production	Guillaume Degroote, Aurélien Ressencourt, Martin Touzé, Frédéric Macé, and Jérôme Dupré (for "Oil and Water")	Won	
Annie Awards	March 12, 2022	Outstanding Achievement for Character Animation in an Animated Television / Broadcast Production	Léa Chervet (for "The Monster You Created")	Won	
Annie Awards	March 12, 2022	Outstanding Achievement for Character Design in an Animated Television / Broadcast Production	Evan Monteiro (for "Some Mysteries Better Left Unsolved")	Won	
Annie Awards	March 12, 2022	Outstanding Achievement for Directing in an Animated Television / Broadcast Production	Pascal Charrue, Arnaud Delord, and Barthelemy Maunoury (for "The Monster You Created")	Won	
Annie Awards	March 12, 2022	Outstanding Achievement for Production Design in an Animated Television / Broadcast Production	Julien Georgel, Aymeric Kevin, and Arnaud Baudry (for "Happy Progress Day!")	Won	
Annie Awards	March 12, 2022	Outstanding Achievement for Storyboarding in an Animated Television / Broadcast Production	Simon Andriveau (for "When These Walls Come Tumbling Down")	Won	
Annie Awards	March 12, 2022	Outstanding Achievement for Voice Acting in an Animated Television / Broadcast Production	Ella Purnell (for "When These Walls Come Tumbling Down")	Won	
Annie Awards	March 12, 2022	Outstanding Achievement for Writing in an Animated Television / Broadcast Production	Christian Linke and Alex Yee (for "The Monster You Created")	Won	
Annie Awards	February 8, 2025	Outstanding Achievement for Animated Effects in an Animated Television/Broadcast Production	Guillaume Degroote, Aurélien Ressencourt, Adam Bachiri, Guillaume Zaouche, Jérôme Dupré (for "The Dirt Under Your Nails")	Won	
Annie Awards	February 8, 2025	Outstanding Achievement for Character Animation in an Animated Television / Broadcast Production	Tom Gouill (for "Killing is a Cycle", "Heavy is the Crown", "Finally Got the Name Right", "The Message Hidden Within the Pattern", "The Dirt Under Your Nails", "Pretend Like It's the First Time", "Blisters and Bedrock")	Won	
Annie Awards	February 8, 2025	Outstanding Achievement for Directing in an Animated Television / Broadcast Production	Arnaud Delord, Pascal Charrue, Bart Maunoury (for "The Dirt Under Your Nails")	Won	
Annie Awards	February 8, 2025	Outstanding Achievement for Editorial in an Animated Television/Broadcast Production	Nazim Meslem, Gilad Carmel, Roberto Fernandez (for "Pretend Like It's the First Time")	Won	
Annie Awards	February 8, 2025	Outstanding Achievement for Music in an Animated Television / Broadcast Production	Ryan Jillian Santiago, Alexander Seaver, Simon Wilcox (for "The Dirt Under Your Nails")	Won	
Annie Awards	February 8, 2025	Outstanding Achievement for Production Design in an Animated Television / Broadcast Production	Arnaud-Loris Baudry, Julien Georgel, Faustine Dumontier, Charlotte O'Neil (for "The Dirt Under Your Nails")	Won	
Annie Awards	February 8, 2025	Outstanding Achievement for Storyboarding in an Animated Television / Broadcast Production	Joséphine Meis (for "Killing is a Cycle")	Won	
Billboard Music Awards	May 15, 2022	Top Soundtrack	Various Artists	Nominated	
British Film Editors Cut Above Awards	April 29, 2022	Best Edited Series: Animation	Ivan Bilancio, Gilad Carmel, Roberto Fernandez, Lawrence Gan, Martin Jay, Benjamin Massoubre, Ernesto Matamoros Cox, Nazim Meslem, Emmanuel Pilinski, and David Ian Salter	Won	
Dorian Awards	August 17, 2022	Best Animated Show	Arcane	Nominated	
Gayming Awards	July 8, 2025	LGBTQ+ Geek Entertainment of the Year Award	Arcane: Season 2 (Netflix)	Won	
GLAAD Media Award	March 27, 2025	Outstanding Drama Series	Arcane	Nominated	
Golden Joystick Awards	November 20, 2025	Best Game Adaptation	Arcane	Won	
Golden Reel Awards	March 13, 2022	Outstanding Achievement in Sound Editing – Non-Theatrical Animation	Brad Beaumont, Eliot Connors, Alexander Temple, Shannon Beaumont, Alexander Ephraim, Dan O' Connell, John Cucci, and Alex Seaver (for "When These Walls Come Tumbling Down")	Won	
Golden Reel Awards	February 23, 2025	Outstanding Achievement in Sound Editing – Non-Theatrical Animation	Brad Beaumont, Eliot Connors, Stephen P. Robinson, Alexander Temple, Andrew Kierszenbaum, Sebastien Najand, Alex Seaver, PJ Pascual, John Cucci, and Dan O'Connell (for "The Dirt Under Your Nails")	Won	
Golden Trailer Awards	May 29, 2025	Best Action (TV Spot) for a TV/Streaming Series	Netflix / Tiny Hero (for "Reckoning")	Won	
Golden Trailer Awards	May 29, 2025	Best Music (TV Spot) for a TV/Streaming Series	Netflix / Tiny Hero (for "Reckoning")	Won	
Golden Trailer Awards	May 29, 2025	Most Original (TV Spot) for a TV/Streaming Series	Netflix / Tiny Hero (for "Reckoning")	Nominated	
Golden Trailer Awards	May 29, 2025	Best Action/Thriller TrailerByte for a TV/Streaming Series	Netflix / Tiny Hero (for "Showdown Parallax")	Nominated	
Hollywood Critics Association TV Awards	August 14, 2022	Best Streaming Animated Series or Television Movie	Arcane	Won	
Hugo Awards	September 1–5, 2022	Best Dramatic Presentation, Short Form	Christian Linke, Alex Yee, Conor Sheehy, Ash Brannon, Pascal Charrue, and Arnaud Delord (for "The Monster You Created")	Nominated	
Primetime Creative Arts Emmy Awards	September 3–4, 2022	Outstanding Animated Program	Christian Linke, Marc Merrill, Brandon Beck, Jane Chung, Thomas Vu, Jerôme Combe, Melinda Wunsch Dilger, Pascal Charrue, Arnaud Delord, Alex Yee, Ash Brannon, Conor Sheehy, Barthelemy Maunoury, and David Lyerly (for "When These Walls Come Tumbling Down")	Won	
Primetime Creative Arts Emmy Awards	September 3–4, 2022	Outstanding Sound Editing for a Comedy or Drama Series (Half-Hour) and Animation	Brad Beaumont, Eliot Connors, Shannon Beaumon, Alex Ephraim, Alexander Temple, Alex Seaver, Dan O'Connel, and John Cucci (for "When These Walls Come Tumbling Down")	Nominated	
Primetime Creative Arts Emmy Awards	September 3–4, 2022	Outstanding Individual Achievement in Animation	Bruno Couchinho (background designer) (for "When These Walls Come Tumbling Down")	Won	
Primetime Creative Arts Emmy Awards	September 3–4, 2022	Outstanding Individual Achievement in Animation	Julien Georgel (art direction) (for "Happy Progress Day!")	Won	
Primetime Creative Arts Emmy Awards	September 3–4, 2022	Outstanding Individual Achievement in Animation	Anne-Laure To (color script artist) (for "The Boy Savior")	Won	
Primetime Creative Arts Emmy Awards	September 6-7, 2025	Outstanding Animated Program	Christian Linke, Marc Merrill, Brandon Beck, Shauna Spenley, Brian Wright, Melinda Wunsch Dilger, Hervé Dupont, Ken Basin, Jerôme Combe, Pascal Charrue, Arnaud Delord, Christine Ponzevera, Amanda Overton, Barthelemy Maunoury, and Amanda Wyatt (for "The Dirt Under Your Nails")	Won	
Primetime Creative Arts Emmy Awards	September 6-7, 2025	Outstanding Sound Editing for an Animated Program	Brad Beaumont, Eliot Connors, Stephen P. Robinson, Janet "PJ" Pascual, Dan O'Connell, and John Cucci (for "The Dirt Under Your Nails")	Won	
Primetime Creative Arts Emmy Awards	September 6-7, 2025	Outstanding Individual Achievement in Animation	Bruno Couchinho (background designer) (for "The Dirt Under Your Nails"	Won	
Primetime Creative Arts Emmy Awards	September 6-7, 2025	Outstanding Individual Achievement in Animation	Faustine Dumontier (colorscript and color keys artist) (for "The Message Hidden Within the Pattern")	Won	
Saturn Awards	October 25, 2022	Best Animated Series on Television	Arcane	Nominated	
The Game Awards	December 8, 2022	Best Adaptation	Arcane	Won	
The Game Awards	December 12, 2024	Best Adaptation	Arcane	Nominated	

== Other media ==
=== Prequel novel ===
A prequel tie-in novel written by C. L. Clark, titled Ambessa: Chosen of the Wolf, was published on February 18, 2025. The novel focuses on Ambessa Medarda before the events of the series.

=== Future and spin-off series ===
Spin-offs featuring characters from other regions in the League of Legends universe are in development.
