= List of songs recorded by Stromae =

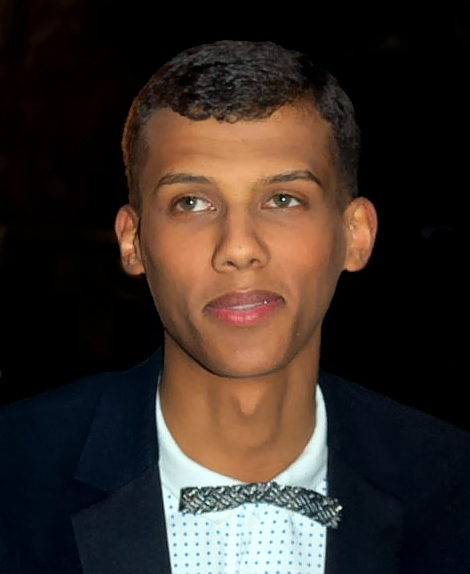
Stromae at the 2011 NRJ Music Award

This is a list of songs recorded by the Belgian musician Stromae. He has recorded two studio albums, two mixtape's, one extended play, one video album and one compilation album (over 50 songs).

== Released songs ==
Key
‡	Single
+	Compilation album song
Non-album single	Released as a single, but did not appear on an album

Name of song, artist(s), writer(s), producer(s), album and year of release
Title	Artist(s)	Writer(s)	Producer(s)	Album	Year	Ref.
"Alors on danse" ‡	Stromae	Stromae	Mosaert (Note: According to Ultratop data "Alors on danse" was produced by members of label Mosaert and Dimitri Borrey.)	Cheese	2009	
"Ave Cesaria" ‡	Stromae	Stromae		Racine carrée	2013	
"AVF"	Stromae featuring Maître Gims and Orelsan	Maître Gims; Orelsan; Stromae	Stromae (Note: Additional production was made by Atom.)	Racine carrée	2013	
"Bâtard"	Stromae	Stromae (Note: According to ACE Repertory data "Bâtard" was written by Thomas Azier and Stromae.)		Racine carrée	2013	
"Bienvenue chez moi" ‡	Stromae	Stromae	Mosaert	Cheese	2010	
"Carmen" ‡	Stromae	Georges Bizet	Stromae; Orelsan	Racine carrée	2013	
"Cheese"	Stromae	Stromae	Mosaert	Cheese	2010	
"C'est Stromae"	Stromae	Unknown		Juste un cerveau, un flow, un fond et un mic...	2007	
"C'est que l'outro"	Stromae and DJ Psar	Unknown		Mixture Elecstro	2009	
"Défiler" ‡	Stromae	Unknown		Non-album single	2018	
"Disco Feeling"	Stromae and DJ Psar	Unknown		Mixture Elecstro	2009	
"Dodo"	Stromae	Stromae	Mosaert	Cheese	2010	
"Elecstricien"	Stromae and DJ Psar	Unknown	Crookers	Mixture Elecstro	2009	
"Encore une fois"	Stromae and DJ Psar	Unknown		Mixture Elecstro	2009	
"Enfants de l'an 2000" ‡	Shadow Loowee, Stromae and Ekila	Unknown		Non-album single	2009	
"Faut que j'arrête le rap"	Stromae and DJ Psar	Unknown	Chase & Status	Mixture Elecstro	2009	
"Faut qu't'arrêtes le rap..." ‡	Stromae featuring J.E.D.I.	Unknown		Non-album single	2005	
"Formidable" ‡	Stromae	Stromae (Note: According to ACE Repertory data "Formidable" was written by Lionel Capouillez and Stromae.)		Racine carrée	2013	
"Galaxy" +	Stromae	Unknown		Overseas: Street dreams	2010	
"House'llelujah" ‡	Stromae	Stromae	Mosaert	Cheese	2010	
"Humain à l'eau"	Stromae	Stromae		Racine carrée	2013	
"Invincible"	Stromae and DJ Psar	Unknown	Logan DeGaulle	Mixture Elecstro	2009	
"J'ai pas ce au'il faut"	Stromae	Unknown		Juste un cerveau, un flow, un fond et un mic...	2007	
"J'me sens bien"	Stromae and DJ Psar	Unknown	Calvin Harris; Benny Benassi	Mixture Elecstro	2009	
"Je cours" ‡	Stromae	Stromae	Mosaert	Cheese	2010	
"Je cours"	Stromae and DJ Psar	Unknown	Pharrell Williams	Mixture Elecstro	2009	
"Je n'ai pas de flow"	Stromae and DJ Psar	Unknown	Laidback Luke	Mixture Elecstro	2009	
"Je m'excuse"	Stromae and DJ Psar	Unknown		Mixture Elecstro	2009	
"Jump to It"	Stromae and DJ Psar	Unknown		Mixture Elecstro	2009	
"Le rap c'est simple"	Stromae	Unknown		Juste un cerveau, un flow, un fond et un mic...	2007	
"Meltdown" ‡	Stromae featuring Lorde, Pusha T, Q-Tip and Haim	Stromae; Lorde; Joel Little; Q-Tip; Pusha T Alana Haim; Este Haim; Danielle Haim	Unknown (Note: Additional production was made by Joel Little.)	The Hunger Games: Mockingjay, Part 1 (Original Motion Picture Soundtrack)	2014	
"Merci"	Stromae	Stromae (Note: According to ACE Repertory data "Merci" was written by Thomas Azier, Aron Ottignon and Stromae.)		Racine carrée	2013	
"Monsieur" +	Stromae, BD Banx	Unknown		Dès Le Dépar... Volume 1	2007	
"Moules frites"	Stromae	Stromae (Note: Additional production was made by Guillaume Huguet.)		Racine carrée	2013	
"Ouais j'suis yo'"	Stromae	Unknown		Juste un cerveau, un flow, un fond et un mic...	2007	
"Papaoutai" ‡	Stromae	Stromae		Racine carrée	2013	
"Peace or Violence" ‡	Stromae	Stromae	Mosaert	Cheese	2010	
"Quand c'est?" ‡	Stromae	Stromae		Racine carrée	2013	
"Quand j'dis gow!"	Stromae and DJ Psar	Unknown		Mixture Elecstro	2009	
"Rail de musique" ‡	Stromae	Stromae	Mosaert	Cheese	2010	
"Repetto X Mosaert" ‡	Stromae	Unknown		Non-album single	2017	
"Silence"	Stromae	Stromae	Mosaert	Cheese	2010	
"Sommeil"	Stromae	Stromae		Racine carrée	2013	
"Summertime"	Stromae	Stromae	Mosaert	Cheese	2010	
"Ta fête" ‡	Stromae	Stromae (Note: Additional production was made by Thomas Azier.)		Racine carrée	2013	
"Te Quiero" ‡	Stromae	Stromae	Mosaert	Cheese	2010	
"Tous les mêmes" ‡	Stromae	Stromae		Racine carrée	2013	
"Up Saw Liz" ‡	Stromae	Unknown		Non-album single	2009	
"Up Saw Liz (+ Remix)"	Stromae and DJ Psar	Unknown		Mixture Elecstro	2009	
"We Will Strock You"	Stromae and DJ Psar	Unknown		Mixture Elecstro	2009	

== Unreleased songs ==
Name of song, artist(s), writer(s), producer(s), album and year of release
Title	Artist(s)	Year	Note	Ref.
"Minimalistyle"	Stromae	2007	Included in music video	
"Y parait"	Stromae	Unknown	Unmastered song	
