= List of awards and nominations received by Stromae =

Stromae awards and nominations
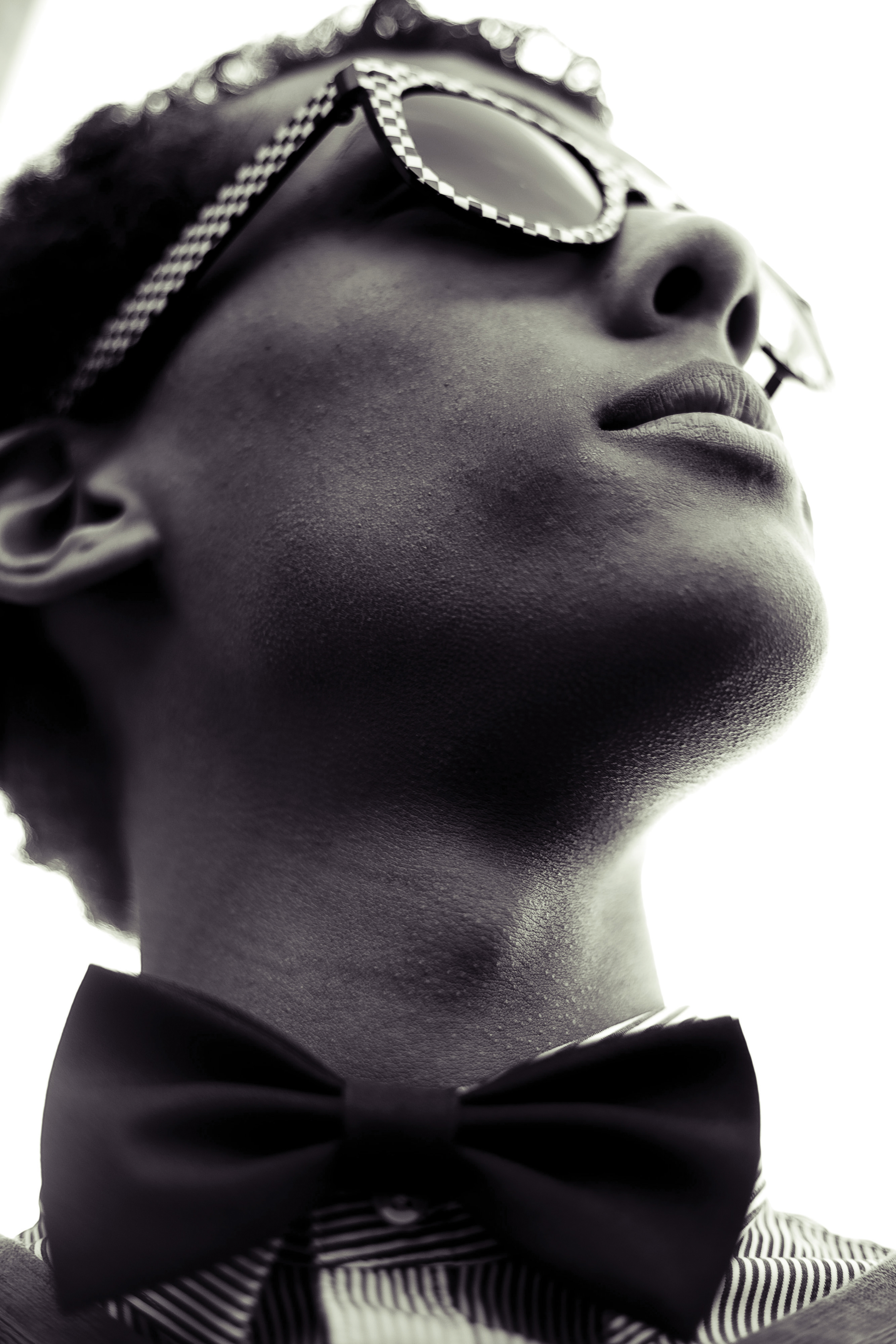
- Stromae in 2010
Awards and nominations
Award	Wins	Nominations

Totals (Note: Certain award groups do not simply award one winner. They acknowledge several different recipients, have runners-up, and have third place. Since this is a specific recognition and is different from losing an award, runner-up mentions are considered wins in this award tally. For simplification and to avoid errors, each award in this list has been presumed to have had a prior nomination.)
- Wins: 57
- Nominations: 89

Stromae is a Belgian musician. He won over 50 awards and was nominated over 80 times for his contributions to the music industry. He has recorded three studio albums: Cheese (2010), Racine carrée (2013) and Multitude (2022)

== Awards and nominations ==
Award	Year	Nominee/work	Category	Result	Ref.
Bel RTL Audience Award	2014	Stromae	Belgian Tube of the Year	Won	
Best Clip Award	2013	"Papaoutai"	Competition Clips	Won	
Berlin Music Video Awards	2016	Quand c'est	Best VFX	Won	
Berlin Music Video Awards	2022	"Fils de joie"	Best Art Direction	Won	
Berlin Music Video Awards	2026	"Que Ce Soit Clair"	Best Experimental	Nominated	
Danish Music Award	2010	"Alors on danse"	Foreign Hit of the Year	Won	
D6bels Music Award	2015	Stromae	Artist Solo	Nominated	
D6bels Music Award	2015	Stromae	Author/Composer	Won	
D6bels Music Award	2015	Stromae	Concert	Won	
D6bels Music Award	2015	"Meltdown"	Hit	Nominated	
D6bels Music Award	2015	"Carmen"	Music video	Nominated	
D6bels Music Award	2015	"Quand c'est?"	Music video	Won	
European Border Breakers Award	2011	Cheese		Won	
European Festival Award	2014	Stromae	Best Headliner	Nominated	
European Festival Award	2014	Stromae	Best Newcomer Act	Won	
European Festival Award	2014	"Papaoutai"	Festival Anthem of the Year	Nominated	
Félix Award	2011	Stromae	Francophonie Artist Who Has Shown the Most in Quebec	Nominated	
Félix Award	2012	Stromae	Francophonie Artist Who Has Shown the Most in Quebec	Won	
Félix Award	2014	Stromae	Francophonie Artist Who Has Shown the Most in Quebec	Won	
Félix Award	2015	Stromae	Francophonie Artist Who Has Shown the Most in Quebec	Won	
Félix Award	2016	Stromae	Francophonie Artist Who Has Shown the Most in Quebec	Won	
Globe de Cristal	2014	Racine carrée	Best Male Performer	Won	
Grand prix de la francophonie	2016	Stromae		Won	
NRJ Music Award	2013	Stromae	Francophone Male Artist of the Year	Won	
NRJ Music Award	2013	"Formidable"	Francophone Song of the Year	Won	
NRJ Music Award	2013	"Formidable"	Music video of the year	Nominated	
NRJ Music Award	2013	"Papaoutai"	Music video of the year	Nominated	
NRJ Music Award	2014	Stromae	Francophone Male Artist of the Year	Nominated	
NRJ Music Award	2014	Stromae	Honor Award	Won	
NRJ Music Award	2014	"Ta fête"	Music Video of the Year	Nominated	
NRJ Music Award	2018	Stromae	Group/Francophone Duo of the Year	Nominated	
NRJ Music Award	2022	Stromae	Francophone Male Artist of the Year	Nominated	
NRJ Music Award	2022	"Mon Amour" (with Camila Cabello)	Francophone Clip of the Year	Nominated	
MTV Europe Music Award	2010	Stromae	Best Dutch and Belgian Act	Nominated	
MTV Europe Music Award	2013	Stromae	Best Belgian Act	Won	
MTV Europe Music Award	2014	Stromae	Best Belgian Act	Nominated	
MTV Europe Music Award	2022	"Fils de joie"	Video for Good	Nominated	
MTV Video Music Awards	2022	"Fils de joie"	Video for Good	Nominated	
Music Industry Award	2010	Stromae	Breakthrough	Won	
Music Industry Award	2010	Stromae	Hit of the Year	Won	
Music Industry Award	2010	Stromae	Best Dance	Nominated	
Music Industry Award	2010	Stromae	Best Pop	Nominated	
Music Industry Award	2010	"Alors on danse"	Best Video	Nominated	
Music Industry Award	2013	Racine Carrée	Album	Won	
Music Industry Award	2013	Racine Carrée	Best Artwork	Won	
Music Industry Award	2013	Stromae	Best Author/Composer	Won	
Music Industry Award	2013	"Formidable"	Best Music Video	Won	
Music Industry Award	2013	Stromae	Dance	Won	
Music Industry Award	2013	"Formidable"	Hit of the Year	Won	
Music Industry Award	2013	Stromae	Pop	Won	
Music Industry Award	2013	Stromae	Solo Man	Won	
Music Industry Award	2014	"Ta fête"	Hit of the Year	Nominated	
Music Industry Award	2014	Stromae	Live Act	Nominated	
Music Industry Award	2014	"Ta fête"	Music Video	Nominated	
Music Industry Award	2014	Stromae	Pop	Won	
Music Industry Award	2014	Stromae	Solo Man	Won	
Music Industry Award	2015	"Quand c'est?"	Best Music Video	Won	
Music Industry Award	2015	Stromae	Solo Man	Won	
Music Industry Award	2018	"Défiler"	Music Video	Won	
Music Industry Award	2021	"Santé"	Best Music Video	Nominated	
Music Industry Award	2021	Stromae	Solo Man	Nominated	
Music Industry Award	2021	Stromae	Pop	Nominated	
Music Industry Award	2022	"Multitude"	Best Album	Nominated	
Music Industry Award	2022	"Multitude"	Best Artwork	Won	
Music Industry Award	2022	"L'enfer"	Song of the year	Nominated	
Music Industry Award	2022	"L'enfer"	Music Video	Won	
Music Industry Award	2022	Stromae	Solo Man	Nominated	
Music Industry Award	2022	Stromae	Pop	Nominated	
Music Industry Award	2022	Stromae	Author / Composer	Nominated	
Music Industry Award	2022	Stromae	Live act	Won	
Music Industry Award	2022	Stromae	Producer	Nominated	
Octave	2011	Stromae	Artist of the Season	Won	
Octave	2011	Stromae	Show/Concert of the Season	Won	
Octave	2014	Stromae	Artist of the Year	Won	
Octave	2014	Stromae	French Song	Won	
Octave	2015	Stromae	Show/Concert of the Season	Won	
Red Bull Elektropedia Award	2013	Stromae	Artist of the Year	Won	
Red Bull Elektropedia Award	2013	Racine carrée	Best Album	Won	
Red Bull Elektropedia Award	2014	Stromae	Artist of the year	Won	
Red Bull Elektropedia Award	2014	Stromae	Best Live Act	Won	
Red Bull Elektropedia Award	2014	"Ta fête"	Best Video	Won	
Red Bull Elektropedia Award	2014	"Tous les mêmes"	Best Video	2nd place	
Red Bull Elektropedia Award	2014	"Ave Cesaria"	Best Video	Nominated	
Red Bull Elektropedia Award	2015	Stromae	Artist of the year	2nd place	
Red Bull Elektropedia Award	2015	Stromae	Best Live Act	2nd place	
Red Bull Elektropedia Award	2015	"Quand c'est?"	Best Video	Won	
Red Bull Elektropedia Award	2018	"Défiler"	Best Video	Won	
Rolf Marbot Award	2013	"Formidable"	Song of the Year	Won	
UK Music Video Award	2013	"Papaoutai"	Best Choreography in a Video	Nominated	
UK Music Video Award	2013	"Papaoutai"	Best Styling in a Video	Nominated	
UK Music Video Award	2014	"Tous les mêmes"	Best Pop Video – International	Nominated	
UK Music Video Award	2015	"Carmen"	Best Animation in a Video	Nominated	
UK Music Video Award	2015	"Carmen"	Best Urban Video – International	Nominated	
UK Music Video Award	2022	"Fils de joie"	Best Pop Video - International	Nominated	
UK Music Video Award	2022	"Fils de joie"	Best Wardrobe Styling in a Video	Nominated	
UK Music Video Award	2022	"Santé"	Best Live Video	Nominated	
Ultratop Download Award	2010	Stromae		Won	
Ultratop Download Award	2013	Stromae		Won	
Urban Music Award	2014	Stromae	Best Electronic/Dance Act 2014	Nominated	
Victoires de la musique	2011	Cheese	Album of the Year	Nominated	
Victoires de la musique	2011	Cheese	Electro/Dance Album of the Year	Won	
Victoires de la musique	2011	"Alors on danse"	Original Song	Nominated	
Victoires de la musique	2014	Racine carrée	Album of Songs	Won	
Victoires de la musique	2014	Stromae	Artist Interpreter Male	Won	
Victoires de la musique	2014	"Formidable"	Music Video	Won	
Victoires de la musique	2014	"Papaoutai"	Music Video	Nominated	
Victoires de la musique	2014	"Formidable"	Original Song	Nominated	
Victoires de la musique	2014	"Papaoutai"	Original Song	Nominated	
Victoires de la musique	2015	Racine carrée tour	Musical Show/Tour/Concert	Nominated	
World Music Award	2014	Stromae	Best-selling Benelux Artist	Won	
World Music Award	2014	Stromae	Best-selling European Solo Artist	Won	

== Honorary degree ==
Name of school, year given, and name of degree
School	Year	Degree	Ref.
Université libre de Bruxelles	2025	Doctor Honoris Causa	
Vrije Universiteit Brussel	2025	Doctor Honoris Causa	
