= Marion Motin =

French dancer and choreographer

Marion Motin (born 26 May 1981) is a French dancer and choreographer.

== Biography ==
Marion Motin is the sister of illustrator Margaux Motin.

She learned classical ballet at an early age, then contemporary dance. Passionate about hip-hop, she began performing in the street and in shopping centers with her friends. She was thus part of a first company, 7th Sens, then Quality Street.

A professional dancer, she has performed on stage with M. Pokora, Shy'm, Madonna (The MDNA Tour in 2012), appeared in Robbie Williams's music video (Rudebox, 2006), and took part in choreography by Angelin Preljocaj.

In 2009, Marion created a women's dance group, Les Swaggers, made up of 7 dancers. They became runners-up in France at the Hip Hop International dance competition.

She is also part of the group La preuve par 4 with Nicolas Médéa, Marvin Gofin, and Julie Moreau.

Marion Motin became the choreographer for the music videos and tours of Stromae (2013) and Christine and the Queens (2014), for France Gall and Bruck Dawit's musical Résiste (2015), and for the tour of Angèle.

In 2023, she began preparing her creation The Last Call with dancers from the Paris Opera.

== Choreographer ==
=== Clips ===
- 2013 : Papaoutai by Stromae
- 2013 : Tous les mêmes by Stromae
- 2014 : Saint Claude by Christine and the Queens
- 2014 : Christine by Christine and the Queens
- 2015 : Quand c'est by Stromae
- 2018 : Défiler (bande originale de la capsule n°5 Mosaert) by Stromae
- 2018 : IDGAF by Dua Lipa

=== Shows ===
- 2014 : In the middle, tour
- 2015 : Résiste by France Gall and Dawit Bruck, Palais des Sports (Paris), tour

== Filmography ==
- 2012 : StreetDance 2 by Max Giwa and Dania Pasquini
