= Quand c'est? =

2015 single by Stromae

Single by Stromae

from the album Racine carrée
- Language: French
- Released: 14 September 2015
- Length: 3:00
- Label: Casablanca; Mercury

Stromae singles chronology
"Carmen" (2015)	"Quand c'est?" (2015)	"Repetto X Mosaert" (2017)

Music video
- "Quand c'est ?" on YouTube

"Quand c'est?" is a song written and performed by Belgian singer Stromae. The song is the seventh and final single from his album Racine carrée. The song was first released as part of its parent album on 16 August 2013, then released as a separate single on 14 September 2015.

The song's title is a play on the similar pronunciations of "quand c'est" and "cancer" in French. The song's lyrics tell of Stromae's personal relationship with cancer, and the cruelness of the disease. This single was performed as part of The Voice – La plus belle voix in 2016 by MB14.

== Music video ==
The music video of the song depicts a silhouette of the artist on a theatrical stage. The video is all black-and-white, inspired by the 2010 video game Limbo. The figure moves around, attempting to avoid a creeping black mass that represents cancer. Eventually, the silhouette falls, and the camera moves upwards revealing a tangled labyrinth of people strangled in the previously mentioned black mass.

== Reception ==
"Quand c'est ?" peaked at 39th in the Ultratop 50 Singles of Flanders and charted in France. The song and accompanying video have received several awards, including Best VFX in the 2016 Berlin Music Video Awards, Best Video in the D6Bels Music Video Awards, Best Video in the Red Bull Elektropedia Awards, and Best Video in the Music Industry Awards. The video for "Quand c'est ?" gained 3.5 million views in the first 36 hours. The New Yorker called the song's melody "haunting." In a review for Mandatory, Ernest Hardy praised the video as "hypnotic" and called the song proof of Stromae's status as "global pop's reigning male visionary."
