= Ave Cesaria =

2014 single by Stromae

Single by Stromae

from the album Racine carrée
- Released: July 21, 2014
- Recorded: October 2012 – August 2013
- Length: 4:10
- Label: Mosaert; Mercury
- Songwriters: Stromae; Orelsan
- Producer: Stromae

Stromae singles chronology
"Ta fête" (2014)	"Ave Cesaria" (2014)	"Meltdown" (2014)

Music video
- "Ave Cesaria" on YouTube

"Ave Cesaria" is a song by Belgian singer Stromae, the fifth single from his second album Racine carrée. It honours the late Cesária Évora. The song can be interpreted as a breakup song with the singer's ex-partner Tatiana Silva who, like Césaria Évora, is of Cape Verdean origin.

== Charts ==
2013 weekly chart performance for "Ave Cesaria"
Chart (2013)	Peak position
France (SNEP)	105

2014 weekly chart performance for "Ave Cesaria"
Chart (2014)	Peak position
Belgium (Ultratop 50 Wallonia)	45
France (SNEP)	97
Belgium (Ultratip Bubbling Under Flanders)	3

== Certifications ==
Certifications and sales for "Ave Cesaria"
Region	Certification	Certified units/sales
France (SNEP)	Platinum	200,000^{‡}
^{‡} Sales+streaming figures based on certification alone.
