= XOV =

XOV may refer to:

- XOV or eXperimental Orbital Vehicle of Blackstar spacecraft, reported codename of a secret United States orbital spaceplane system
- XOV (musician), Swedish singer-songwriter, of Iranian origin
