= The Hunger Games: Mockingjay – Part 1 (soundtrack) =

The Hunger Games: Mockingjay – Part 1 (Original Motion Picture Soundtrack)

Soundtrack album by various artists
- Released: November 17, 2014
- Recorded: 2014
- Studio: Air Lyndhurst (London)
- Genres: Electronic; alternative pop
- Length: 50:11
- Label: Republic
- Compiler: Lorde

Lorde chronology
Pure Heroine (2013)	The Hunger Games: Mockingjay – Part 1 (Original Motion Picture Soundtrack) (2014)	Melodrama (2017)

Singles from The Hunger Games: Mockingjay – Part 1
- 1. "Yellow Flicker Beat" Released: September 29, 2014; 2. "The Hanging Tree" Released: December 9, 2014

The Hunger Games: Mockingjay – Part 1 (Original Motion Picture Soundtrack) is the soundtrack album to the 2014 The Hunger Games: Mockingjay – Part 1, curated by New Zealand singer-songwriter Lorde. The soundtrack has been described by music critics as an electropop record with elements of hip hop, synth pop and the use of electronic beats throughout the album. The melodic style of the songs is a deviation from the guitar-driven sound of the previous series' soundtracks.

The soundtrack received positive reviews following its release from music critics who praised its dystopian mood and Lorde's curation. It was included on several year-end lists. "Yellow Flicker Beat" was released as the lead single on September 29, 2014, and received generally positive reviews. It was nominated for Best Original Song at the 72nd Golden Globe Awards and Best Song at the 20th Critics' Choice Awards. "The Hanging Tree" is the only song included in the film's score. It was later included on the re-released soundtrack, and after the album's success was announced as the second single. The album debuted at number 18 on the Billboard 200 with sales of 21,000 units according to Billboard.

== Background ==
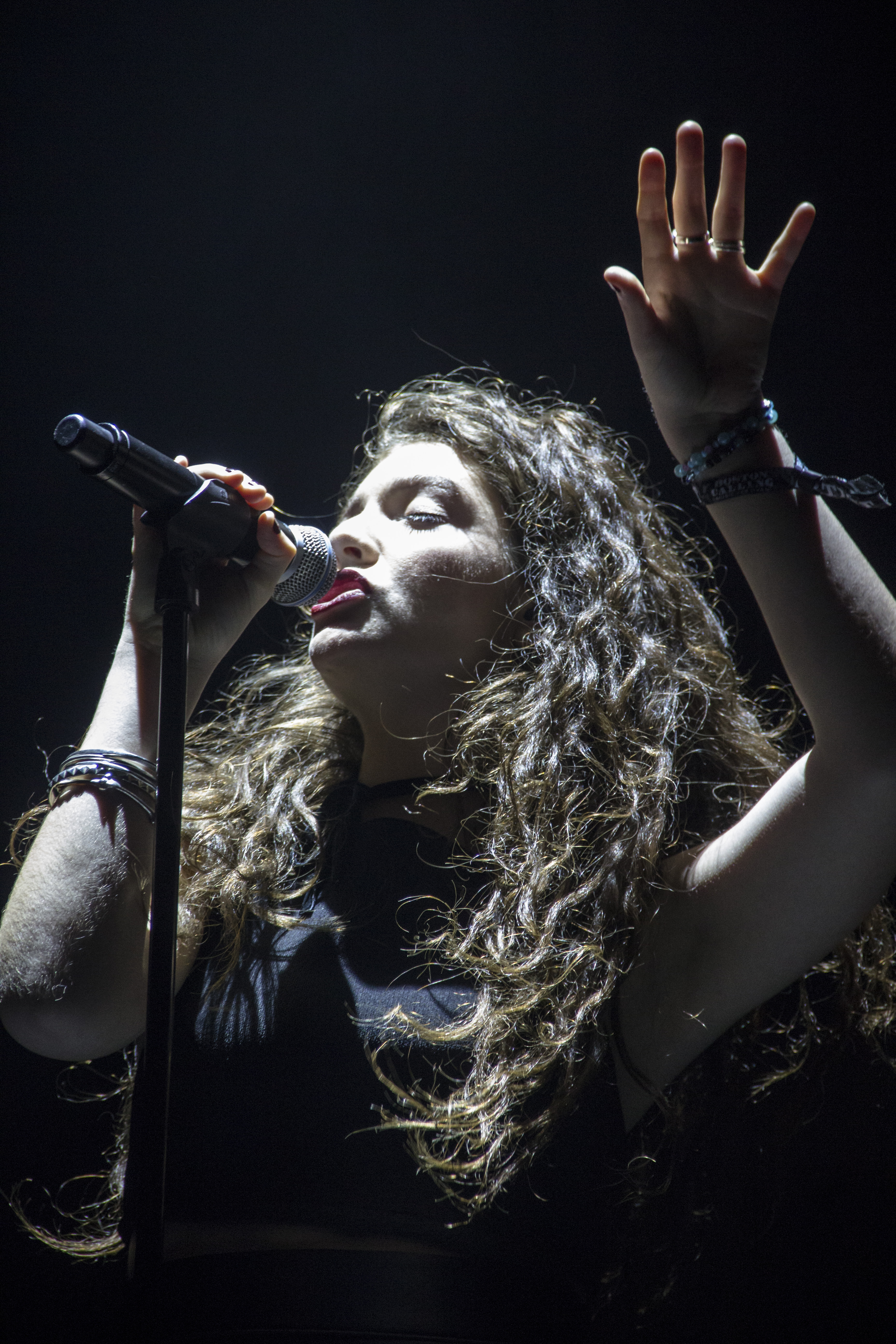
Lorde (pictured) was originally scheduled to write the end-credits song for the film but was offered to curate the full soundtrack after a recommendation from her publisher.

Lionsgate announced on July 31, 2014, that Lorde would provide a single for the film's soundtrack album and curate the record. Director Francis Lawrence released a statement saying that he sat down with Lorde on the set of Mockingjay when filming commenced in spring and was "immediately struck" by how she "innately understood" what the filmmakers were trying to do with the film. He noted her talent and understanding of the story's characters and themes which not only enabled her to write a song that captured the essence of the film, but her insight and passion made her the ideal creative force to assemble other songs in the movie's soundtrack.

Lorde admitted that it was a challenge to create a soundtrack for a much-anticipated film, but she "jumped" at the chance. In a press release, the singer spoke of her experience curating the soundtrack. "The cast and story are an inspiration for all musicians participating and, as someone with cinematic leanings, being privy to a different creative process has been a unique experience. I think the soundtrack is definitely going to surprise people."

When speaking about his contribution to the soundtrack, Duran Duran's Simon Le Bon said that he was surprised when he received a call from his manager telling him that there was a slot for him to do a duet with English singer Charli XCX. Le Bon mentioned that the track was "really different" but "very, very, very dark". XCX mentioned that Lorde reached out to her through a private message via Instagram, but she never responded. Eventually, the pair found a way to communicate. In March 2020, she revealed she had never watched The Hunger Games until that month, stating that she wrote the song aided by Lorde's email containing a plot summary and a "vibe [Lorde] wanted so she just went with it". Martin Doherty of Chvrches revealed that the group wrote "Dead Air" in approximately two to three days. He also mentioned that Lorde instructed them not to make the track "too downbeat". The group took inspiration from the "deliberate choir vocals" of the 1998 song "Cry Little Sister", taken from The Lost Boys soundtrack. In an interview with Billboard, Lorde mentioned that she put off calling Kanye West as she finds it difficult to communicate with people she does not know on the phone.

As the album's curator, Lorde recruited 1980s artists such as Jamaican–American singer Grace Jones and English musician Le Bon, pop acts like Scottish band Chvrches, American band Haim and English singer Charli XCX, emerging American artists such as R&B singer Tinashe and rapper Raury, and electronic projects such as Jamaican–American trio Major Lazer and British duo the Chemical Brothers to contribute to the official track list.

== Release ==
The track list for the soundtrack was made public on October 21, 2014. All the track names were included except for the fifth track which was simply titled "Track 5". Lorde said that day that the unnamed track was not yet finished and it was not being kept a mystery for "secrecy's sake". Ariana Grande revealed in a livestream on October 29, 2014, that she and Major Lazer were the artists behind the fifth track. On November 2, 2014, the track's title, "All My Love", was announced, confirming Grande as the performer. The soundtrack was released on the Australian and New Zealand iTunes Store on November 14 and was released worldwide through Republic Records on November 17, 2014. On December 3, 2014, the soundtrack was re-released digitally with the addition of "The Hanging Tree" by James Newton Howard featuring Jennifer Lawrence as the album's 15th song. The song was originally released with the movie's score.

== Writing and development ==
Lorde revealed that the process of working on the soundtrack took approximately two to three months while she was touring. She made it a priority to listen to music meant for the record. Her record label gave her full autonomy to curate the soundtrack. She also scouted the artists involved along with her publisher, Ron Perry. When selecting the artists, Lorde said that she tried to be "quite disciplined" to keep her focus on those who embodied the film and its story as well as her own writing. She left the track's direction "fairly open" to the contributing artist. Later, she advised them if the track needed improvements. Most of the tracks were recorded remotely, except "Meltdown", which Lorde sang in the studio with Haim.

In an interview with Billboard, Lorde said that it was important for the soundtrack not to sound like her own mixtape. In a Twitter Q&A, the singer acknowledged that most of the songs were "downbeat", saying that she felt it was critical to address the balance between the film's themes of adversity and strength. Lorde revealed that every artist on the soundtrack was either personally selected or approached by her. A collaboration between Tiny Ruins and David Lynch was to be included on the record but did not make the final cut. Lorde felt the song did not match the tonality of the rest of the soundtrack. She included her cover of Bright Eyes' "Ladder Song" on the soundtrack as she felt it was sung from the perspective of a "divine being [...] looking down at the events of Panem". Conor Oberst, the leading frontman of the band, had suggested Lorde cover his song, noting that she would do a "cool job" with it.

== Composition ==
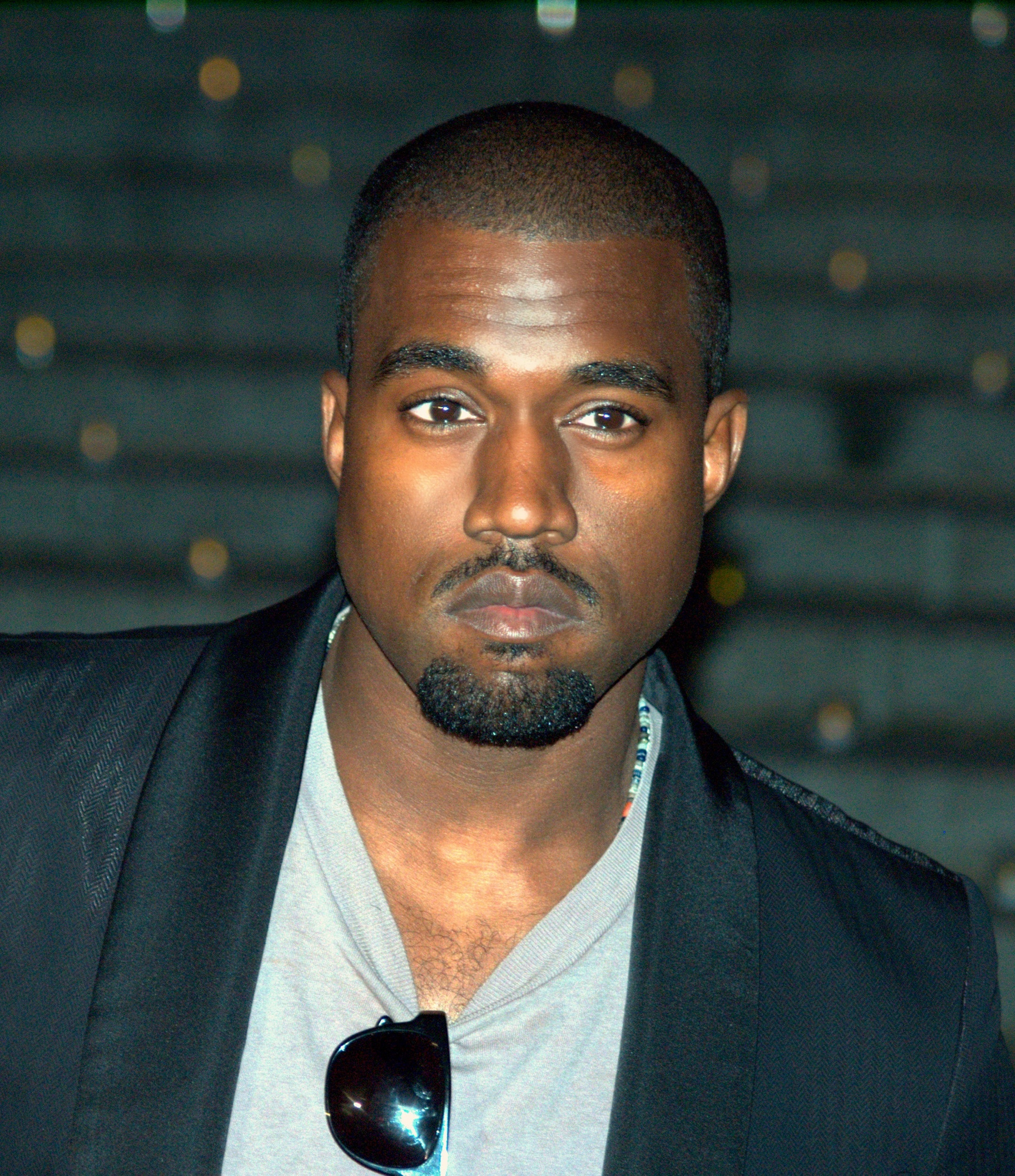
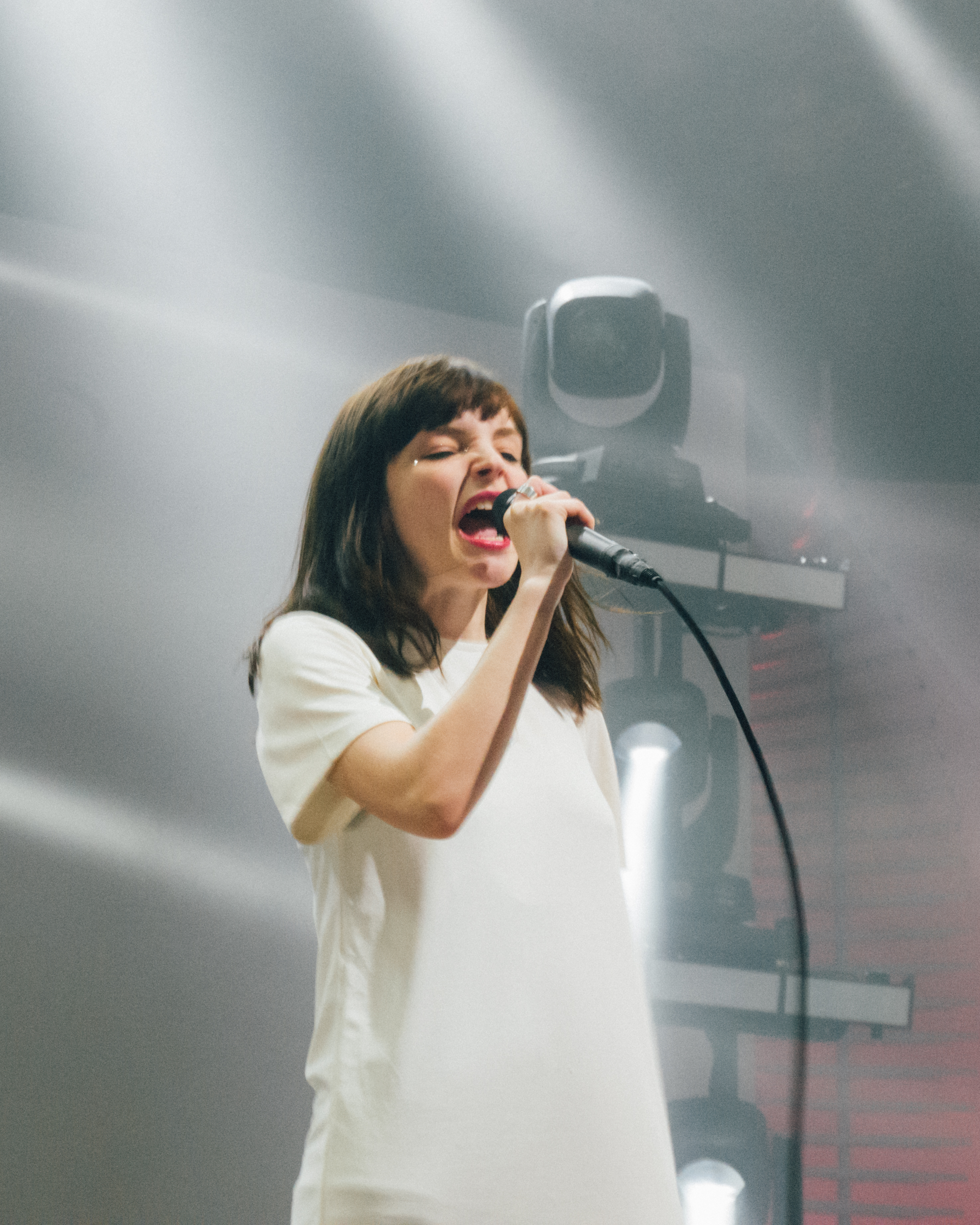
The soundtrack features contributions from artists such as Kanye West and Chvrches (Lauren Mayberry pictured).

"Meltdown", the soundtrack's opening song was described by Alex Hudson of Exclaim as having a "propulsive pulse that spans hip-hop and pop". Time editor Melissa Locker characterized it as a "dark synth dance track" with "an '80s-influenced kinetic earworm". Its lyrics call out the film's "image-obsessed bourgeoisie of the Capitol" which Jamieson Cox of Billboard described as "language that would be just as appropriate for real-life society". The second song, "Dead Air", is a "synth-heavy rabble-rouser" with a "revolutionary" theme about obtaining "freedom from President Snow's tyrannical regime".

The following track, "Scream My Name", details how accustomed one can become to dealing with problems on a day-to-day basis. "Kingdom" is a dream pop piano ballad written by Charli XCX and Vampire Weekend's Rostam Batmanglij after the pair got drunk at a Miley Cyrus concert. The following track, "All My Love", was described by critics as an electropop and dance-pop number with elements of dancehall in its production. "Lost Souls" is a "tense lament" that features Raury rapping.

"Yellow Flicker Beat" is an art pop song with lyrics referencing the rise of Katniss Everdeen, the main protagonist of The Hunger Games series. The song begins with a slow and measured beat, before the drums appear towards the chorus. The Sydney Morning Herald compared its "relentless electronic rhythm" to a "slightly less aggressive Depeche Mode in their heroin years". The track's production features a "solid, thumping bass drum and nagging keyboard line". The next track, "The Leap" is described as "heartbreaking, chilling and vulnerable", while Bat for Lashes' cover of Son Lux's "Plan the Escape" features a "bold, wobbly bass line and headphone-happy rhythms" that was compared to songs by Kate Bush.

The next track, "Original Beast", features "conga polyrhythms", a "menacing synthetic bass-line" and reggae influences. The remix of "Yellow Flicker Beat", titled "Flicker", stripped away the synth production of the original for an "ambient-noise hellscape", according to Rolling Stone. Providing a shift in tone, "Animal" uplifts the atmosphere of the soundtrack while still retaining the overall dark intentions of the production. "This Is Not a Game" was noted by Grantland for its unlikely pairing of artists. The reviewer said that Lorde kept up the tradition of unlikely collaborations from the '90s, such as Pearl Jam and Cypress Hill's "Real Thing" (1993), the Crystal Method's "(Can't You) Trip Like I Do" (1997) featuring Filter and the Pretenders and Kool Keith's 1998 remix "My City Was Gone". The song was also noted for being dark and electric, as Lorde utters the words "There it is" before the chorus over "pulverizing beats".

== Singles ==
"Yellow Flicker Beat"
A sample of "Yellow Flicker Beat", an art pop and electropop song with lyrics that detail the rise of Katniss Everdeen.

In the United States, "Yellow Flicker Beat" debuted at number 17 on Billboard's Alternative Songs chart. Lorde achieved the highest debut by a female artist on the chart since 1995 when Juliana Hatfield's "Universal Heart-Beat" also debuted in the same slot. The single also appeared on the Adult Alternative Songs at number 19 with 5.2 million radio audience impressions in the first-week. On the Billboard Hot 100, the single peaked at number 34. "Yellow Flicker Beat" also charted on several national record charts, including Australia, Canada, Ireland, and the United Kingdom. The single was a success in New Zealand, peaking at number four on the New Zealand Singles Chart. It was certified gold by Recorded Music NZ and gold by the Australian Recording Industry Association (ARIA). "Yellow Flicker Beat" was nominated for Best Original Song at the 72nd Golden Globe Awards, and Best Song at the 20th Critics' Choice Awards.

Initially released as part of the film's score, "The Hanging Tree" was included on a digital release with the song as the 15th track. It was later released as the second single from the album. The song debuted at number 12 on the US Billboard Hot 100 for the week of December 13, 2014, and debuted outside the number 50 position (2.1 million U.S. streams) on Streaming Songs, charting at number two (200,000 downloads sold) on Digital Songs and received eight spins on U.S. radio. "The Hanging Tree" became the highest-charting song from The Hunger Games franchise on the chart, surpassing "Eyes Open" by Taylor Swift, which peaked at number 19. Lawrence became one of several Academy Award winning recipients to chart on the Hot 100. The song peaked at number one in Austria, Germany and Hungary; it peaked in the top five in Australia. It was certified platinum by Music Canada (MC) for shipments of 80,000 units and double platinum by the Recording Industry Association of America (RIAA).

== Critical reception ==
Professional ratings
Aggregate scores
Source	Rating
Metacritic	77/100
Review scores
Source	Rating
AllMusic	3.5/5 stars
Billboard	4/5 stars
New York Daily News	3/5 stars
Digital Spy	3/5 stars
Los Angeles Times	3/4 stars
The National	3/5 stars
NME	8/10
Pitchfork	7.8/10
Rolling Stone	3.5/5 stars

The soundtrack received mostly positive reviews from music critics who praised its dystopian mood and Lorde's curation but criticized its downtempo change towards the latter part of the soundtrack. At review aggregate site Metacritic, the soundtrack has an average score of 77 out of 100, based on eight reviews, indicating "generally positive reviews". Corban Goble of Pitchfork commended the contributing artists on the soundtrack for bringing their "A-game out of respect for the project's core vision and passion". Billboard writer Jamieson Cox called it "a glance at 2014's finest purveyors of complex, downcast pop and a complement to the start of the series' chaotic, brutal conclusion".

Despite the praise, some reviewers had mixed feelings. Digital Spy writer Harry Fletcher wrote that while Lorde was backed by a "squad of willing artists", she assembled a soundtrack that "although pulsating in parts, dithers and ultimately falls flat". The New York Daily News gave the soundtrack a mixed review saying its "dense, ambient sound" makes "things sound murky and diffuse". The National awarded the soundtrack three stars out of five, with the publication commending Lorde for curating a "concoction of dark magic, enchanting tunes and revolutionary feelings".

=== Accolades ===
In its year end review of albums released in 2015, Cosmopolitan ranked the soundtrack at number 14. Spin magazine placed the soundtrack at number nine on their year end list of pop albums with Andrew Unterberger praising the singer for bringing artists from different genres together, while the soundtrack remained cohesive. Similarly, in its year end review of pop albums, Rolling Stone listed the soundtrack at number nine, with Charles Aaron expressing that despite Katniss Everdeen's "broadly drawn" characteristics, "Katniss instantly develops a more complex, combative, introspective personality" through Lorde's soundtrack.

== Track listing ==
Standard version
No.	Title	Writer(s)	Producer(s)	Length
1.	"Meltdown" (Stromae featuring Lorde, Pusha T, Q-Tip and Haim)	Paul Van Haver; Ella Yelich-O'Connor; Joel Little; Kamaal Ibn John Fareed; Terrence Thornton; Alana Haim; Este Haim; Danielle Haim	Stromae; Thomas Azier; Aron Ottingnon; Little^{[a]}	4:02
2.	"Dead Air" (Chvrches)	Iain Cook; Martin Doherty; Lauren Mayberry	Chvrches	3:14
3.	"Scream My Name" (Tove Lo)	Lo	Lo; Ludvig Söderberg^{[a]}; Peter Carlsson^{[b]}	3:34
4.	"Kingdom" (Charli XCX featuring Simon Le Bon)	Charlotte Aitchison; Rostam Batmanglij; Le Bon; Holly Hardy	Batmanglij; Ariel Rechtshaid	4:05
5.	"All My Love" (Major Lazer featuring Ariana Grande)	Thomas Wesley Pentz; Yelich-O'Connor; Karen Marie Ørsted; Philip Meckseper; Boaz de Jong; Grande	Diplo; Boaz van de Beatz; Jr Blender	3:32
6.	"Lost Souls" (Raury)	Raury	Raury	2:53
7.	"Yellow Flicker Beat (Hunger Games)" (Lorde)	Yelich-O'Connor; Little	Paul Epworth; Little	3:54
8.	"The Leap" (Tinashe)	Tinashe Kachingwe; Andrew Aged; Daniel Aged	Inc.	4:06
9.	"Plan the Escape" (Bat for Lashes)	Ryan Lott	Natasha Khan	2:30
10.	"Original Beast" (Grace Jones)	Jones; Ivor Guest	Guest; Jones^{[c]}	4:21
11.	"Flicker (Kanye West Rework)" (Lorde)	Yelich-O'Connor; Little; Kanye West; Mike Dean; Noah Goldstein	West; Dean; Goldstein	4:12
12.	"Animal" (XOV)	XOV; Jonas Saeed; Pia Sjöberg	XOV; Kono	3:18
13.	"This Is Not a Game" (The Chemical Brothers featuring Miguel; uncredited vocals from Lorde)	Tom Rowlands; Miguel Pimentel; Yelich-O'Connor	The Chemical Brothers	3:14
14.	"Ladder Song" (Lorde)	Conor Oberst	Little	3:16
Total length:				50:11

Extended version (digital only)
No.	Title	Writer(s)	Producer(s)	Length
15.	"The Hanging Tree" (James Newton Howard and Jennifer Lawrence)	Jeremiah Fraites; Suzanne Collins; Wesley Schultz	Howard; Sven Faulconer	3:38
Total length:				53:49

Notes

- ^{^[a]} signifies an additional producer
- ^{^[b]} signifies an additional vocal producer
- ^{^[c]} signifies a co-producer

== Personnel ==
Credits for The Hunger Games: Mockingjay – Part 1 (Original Motion Picture Soundtrack) adapted from AllMusic.

Performers

- Lorde – primary artist, vocals (tracks 1, 7, 11, 14)
- Bat for Lashes – primary artist, vocals (track 9)
- Charli XCX – primary artist, vocals (track 4)
- The Chemical Brothers – primary artist (track 13)
- Chvrches – primary artist (track 2)
- Lauren Mayberry – primary artist, vocals (track 2)
- Ariana Grande – featured artist, vocals (track 5)
- Haim – featured artist, vocals (track 1)
- Holly Hardy – background vocals (track 4)
- Grace Jones – primary artist, vocals (track 10)
- Simon Le Bon – featured artist, vocals (track 4)
- Tove Lo – primary artist, vocals (track 3)
- Major Lazer – primary artist (track 5)
- Miguel – featured artist, vocals (track 13)
- Eska Mtungwazi – background vocals
- Pusha T – featured artist, vocals (track 1)
- Q-Tip – featured artist, vocals (track 1)
- Raury – primary artist, vocals (track 6)
- Ariel Rechtshaid – background vocals (track 4)
- Stromae – primary artist, vocals (track 1)
- Tinashe – primary artist, vocals (track 8)
- XOV – primary artist, vocals (track 12)

Production

- Andrew Aged – guitar (track 8)
- Daniel Aged – drum programming, keyboards (track 8)
- Yaw Asumadu – percussion
- Rostam Batmanglij – drums, engineer, musician, piano, production, programming, synthesizer programming (track 4)
- Hamilton Berry – cello
- Frank Byng – percussion
- The Chemical Brothers – production (track 13)
- Chvrches – engineer, mastering, mixing, production (track 2)
- Iain Cook – musician, programming (track 2)
- Mike Dean – engineer, musician, production, programming (track 11)
- Martin Doherty – musician, programming (track 2)
- Paul Epworth – mixing, production (track 7)
- Adam Green – guitar
- Noah Goldstein – engineer, musician, production, programming (track 11)
- Ivor Guest – engineer, keyboards, mixing, percussion, production, programming (track 10)
- Boaz de Jung – musician, programming (track 5)
- Natasha Khan – drum programming, piano, production, synthesizer (track 9)
- Kono – engineer, mixing, musician, production (track 12)
- Joel Little – additional production, engineer, mixing, musician, production, programming (tracks 7 and 14)
- Ebba Tove Elsa Nilsson – engineer, musician, production, programming (track 3)
- Lauren Mayberry – musician, programming (track 2)
- Philip Meckseper – engineer, musician, programming
- Thomas Wesley Pentz – mixing, production, musician, programming (track 5)
- Dave Okumu – guitar
- Raury – production (track 6)
- Ariel Rechtshaid – drum programming, engineer, production, synthesizer programming (track 4)
- Matthew Rees-Roberts – guitar
- Sebastian "Seb" Rochford – drums
- Tom Rowlands – mixing, musician, programming (track 13)
- Ludvig Söderberg – additional production (track 3)
- Cara Walker – production
- Kanye West – production (track 11)
- Damian Ardestani – engineer, mixing, musician, production (track 12)

Technical

- Paul Bailey – vocal engineer
- Dan Carey – mixing
- Ben Christophers – engineer, synthesizer
- Cameron Craig – engineer
- Steve Dub – engineer, vocal engineer
- Björn Engelmann – mastering
- Paul Falcone – engineer
- Justin Gerrish – engineer
- Stuart Hawkes – mastering
- Steven Hawks – mastering
- Bobby Hester – engineer
- Tom Hough – vocal engineer
- Steve "Dub" Jones – mixing
- Peter Karlsson – vocal engineer, vocal production
- Anthony Kilhoffer – mixing
- Dave Kutch – mastering
- Ronny Lahti – mixing
- Willy Linton – mixing
- Brian Lacey – mastering
- Erik Madrid – mixing
- Manny Marroquin – mixing
- Sam Martin – engineer
- Sean Martin – assistant engineer
- Joe Mystic – vocal engineer
- Nick Rowe – engineer
- Alexis Smith – mixing assistant
- Jaime Velez – engineer
- Vincent Vu – mixing assistant
- Matt Wiggins – engineer

Artwork

- Tim Palen – photography

== Charts ==
=== Weekly charts ===
Chart (2014)	Peak position
Australian Albums (ARIA)	36
Austrian Albums (Ö3 Austria)	60
Belgian Albums (Ultratop Flanders)	58
Belgian Albums (Ultratop Wallonia)	54
Canadian Albums (Billboard)	22
German Albums (Offizielle Top 100)	73
New Zealand Albums (RMNZ)	9
Norwegian Albums (VG-lista)	30
South Korean International Albums (Circle)	19
Swiss Albums (Schweizer Hitparade)	64
UK Compilation Albums (Official Charts)	35
US Billboard 200	18
US Top Alternative Albums (Billboard)	3
US Soundtrack Albums (Billboard)	3

=== Year-end charts ===
Chart (2015)	Position
US Billboard 200	122
US Soundtrack Albums (Billboard)	17

== Certifications and sales ==
Region	Certification	Certified units/sales
New Zealand (RMNZ)	Gold	7,500^{‡}
United States	—	21,000
^{‡} Sales+streaming figures based on certification alone.

== Release history ==
Region	Date	Version	Format	Label	Catalogue no.	Ref.
Europe	November 17, 2014	Standard version	CD; digital download	Republic	470806-4	
United States	November 17, 2014	Standard version	CD; digital download	Republic	B0022224-02	
Canada	December 3, 2014	Extended version	Digital download	Republic	—N/a	
United States	December 3, 2014	Extended version	Digital download	Republic	—N/a	
Mexico	December 3, 2014	Extended version	Digital download	Republic	—N/a	
