= Serge (llama) =

Llama famous for being source of a meme

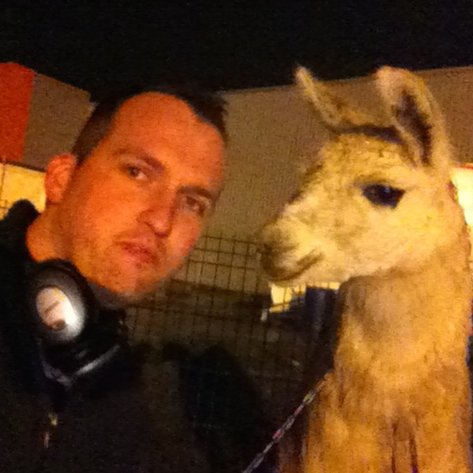
- Species: Llama
- Born: June 29, 2005; Saint-Nazaire, France
- Died: 2020 (aged 14–15)

Serge the llama (29 June 2005 – 2020) was a llama in the circus Cirque Franco-Italien of John Beautour and internet meme. Serge was named after the French singer Serge Lama, who described the choice of name as "genius".

During the night of 30 to 31 October 2013, while the circus was performing in Bordeaux, the llama was taken from its cage by a group of five youths returning from a disco. They took the llama out for a walk, posted some pictures on social media, and took it on a tram. The five were arrested by the police and Serge was returned to his owner, unharmed.

Initially the circus director John Beautour pressed charges. However, the photos went viral on the internet, leading to a lot of publicity for the circus. Beautour subsequently dropped the charges.

The llama was bookable for parties at 1,200 Euros per event, and appeared as a mascot at soccer games.

A parody of the Stromae song "Papaoutai" called "Lamaoutai" was viewed more than 4 million times on YouTube. The parody was made with the cooperation of the circus.
