= Humain à l'eau =

Song by Stromae

from the album Racine carrée
- Recorded: December 2012
- Length: 3:59
- Label: Universal Music
- Songwriter: Stromae
- Producer: Stromae

"Humain à l'eau" (English: 'Human Overboard', 'Man Overboard') is a song by Stromae from his second album Racine carrée.

== Background ==
On December 21 2012, Stromae published a video to his YouTube channel, showing him producing some parts of the song. He then performs the song, alongside some visual effects. The entire video was shot inside a supermarket.

== Chart positions ==
Chart (2013)	Peak position
Belgium (Ultratop 50 Wallonia)	47
France (SNEP)	110
