= Bâtard (song) =

Song by Stromae

from the album Racine carrée
- Recorded: 2013
- Length: 3:29
- Label: Mosaert
- Songwriter: Stromae
- Producer: Stromae

"Bâtard" (English: "Bastard", stylised in lowercase) is a song by Stromae from his second album Racine carrée.

== Chart positions ==
Chart (2013–14)	Peak position
Belgium (Ultratop 50 Wallonia)	37
Belgium Dance (Ultratop Wallonia)	28
France (SNEP)	52

== Certifications ==
Certifications and sales for "Bâtard"
Region	Certification	Certified units/sales
France (SNEP)	Gold	100,000^{‡}
^{‡} Sales+streaming figures based on certification alone.
