= Meltdown (Stromae song) =

Song by Belgian artist Stromae

Song by Stromae featuring Lorde, Pusha T, Q-Tip and Haim

from the album The Hunger Games: Mockingjay, Part 1
- Released: 17 November 2014
- Studio: Ab Lab (Englewood, NJ); Harmony Studios (Los Angeles, CA); Thomas Crown Studios (Virginia Beach, VA)
- Genre: Electro; dance-pop
- Length: 4:02
- Label: Republic
- Songwriters: Paul Van Haver; Ella Yelich-O'Connor; Joel Little; Kamaal Ibn John Fareed; Terrence Thornton; Alana Haim; Este Haim; Danielle Haim

"Meltdown" is a song by Belgian artist Stromae featuring additional vocals from New Zealand singer Lorde, American rappers Pusha T and Q-Tip, as well as American indie rock band Haim. It was released on 17 November 2014 as the opening track for the soundtrack album of the motion picture The Hunger Games: Mockingjay – Part 1. "Meltdown" uses the instrumentation of "Merci", taken from Stromae's second studio album Racine carrée (2013), which was produced by the lead artist, Thomas Azier and Aron Ottingnon. It was well received by music critics and charted at the top spot in several of Stromae's native charts.

== Background and composition ==
"Meltdown"
A 19-second sound sample from "Meltdown", an electro and dance-pop number with hip hop influences utilizing drums and piano in its production.

"Meltdown" was written by Stromae, Lorde (credited under her birth-name Ella Yelich-O'Connor), Joel Little, Kamaal Ibn John Fareed, Terrence Thornton, and Este Haim, Danielle Haim and Alana Haim from the indie rock band Haim. It was released on 17 November 2014 as the opening track for the soundtrack album of the 2014 motion picture The Hunger Games: Mockingjay, Part 1. The song was taken from "Merci", an instrumental track from Stromae's second studio album Racine carrée (2013).

Melissa Locker from Time described "Meltdown" as a "dark synth dance track" and "an '80s-influenced kinetic earworm", while NME called it a "bombastic electro stomp." Exclaim described "Meltdown" as having a "propulsive pulse that spans hip-hop and pop" and Complex characterized it as a "piano-laced, drum pounding production" track. Stromae explained that the song came together after Lorde called his manager to "get a track (for the Hunger Games: Mockingjay soundtrack)". Although the song was from Stromae's album Racine carrée, Lorde "decided to do a new track with it". Stromae said he was touched with how important it was for her to have his opinion, even with invited guests on the track. He described Lorde as being "human, simple and really nice". At one point in the song, Pusha T calls out the film's "image-obsessed bourgeoisie of the Capitol" which Billboard described as "language that would be just as appropriate for real-life society". In his verse, he sings:

We're all tryna be somebody else
You can't hide your tears in wealth
When your heart knows you hate yourself

== Reception ==
"Meltdown" received generally positive reviews from music critics with several critics praising Lorde and Haim's vocal delivery but criticizing the latter's lack of vocals on the song. Jon Dolan from Rolling Stone called it a "thick, agitated groove that sounds like an all-night dance party in war-torn District 13." Time editor Melissa Locker stated that "Meltdown" would make "people [bob] their heads from here to Panem." Other critics shared mixed to positive opinions. NME praised the song but criticized Haim's contribution which was described as "limited" to backing vocals. Alex Hudson from Exclaim also noted Haim's "fairly low" contribution but were pleased when their "distinctive harmonized hooks come to the fore in the final passage."

Despite "Meltdown" not charting in many countries, it was commercially successful in Belgium. Shortly after the film's release, the song debuted and peaked at number seven in Belgium's Flanders chart component, which records music sales for the north part of the country. In Wallonia, Belgium's southern chart component, "Meltdown" peaked at number 5. It charted at number one on Belgium's Urban chart. In France, "Meltdown" had a minor chart placement at 107.

== Charts ==
2014 weekly chart performance for "Meltdown"
Chart (2014)	Peak position
Belgium (Ultratop 50 Flanders)	7
Belgium (Ultratip Bubbling Under Flanders)	1
Belgium Urban (Ultratop Flanders)	1
Belgium (Ultratop 50 Wallonia)	5
Belgium (Ultratip Bubbling Under Wallonia)	1
France (SNEP)	107
Lebanon Airplay (Lebanese Top 20)	14
Netherlands (Dutch Top 40 Tipparade)	14

2015 weekly chart performance for "Meltdown"
Chart (2015)	Peak position
Belgium (Ultratop 50 Flanders)	24
Belgium (Ultratop 50 Wallonia)	22
Netherlands (Dutch Top 40 Tipparade)	12
