= Carmen (Stromae song) =

Single by Stromae

from the album Racine carrée
- Released: 30 March 2015
- Recorded: 2013
- Genre: Electro-hop
- Length: 3:37
- Label: Mosaert; Mercury; Casablanca
- Composers: Georges Bizet; Stromae
- Lyricists: Stromae; Orelsan
- Producer: Stromae

Stromae singles chronology
"Meltdown" (2014)	"Carmen" (2015)	"Quand c'est ?" (2015)

Music video
- "Carmen" on YouTube

"Carmen" is a song by Belgian singer Stromae, the sixth single from his second album Racine carrée.

The animated music video, illustrated by Sylvain Chomet, the director of Belleville Rendez-Vous, was posted on social networks by the Facebook account of the American news website BuzzFeed Music. The video and lyrics of the song violently attack social networks through the depiction of the Twitter bird, set to the tune of "Habanera" from Georges Bizet's opera Carmen, of which the song is an adaptation.

== Music video ==
The animated video was drawn by Sylvain Chomet. At the beginning of the clip, a young Stromae can be seen on his Twitter (now currently X) account. A little blue bird (with the appearance of nearly resembling a dwarf-like pigeon) arrives (representative of the mascot of Twitter) who starts to hum. Stromae takes a selfie with the bird and puts the picture on his account. Gradually, the bird becomes larger and takes up more space in his life and keeps him away from others, while Stromae grows up. The bird eventually takes him and puts him on its back as it travels down a stretch of road. On the back of other identical birds, he sees other celebrities like Orelsan, Justin Bieber, Kanye West and Kim Kardashian, Lady Gaga, Barack Obama, Queen Elizabeth II of the United Kingdom, and many others. Then his bird takes him by the neck and feeds him and the others to a huge blue avian monster, who is seen excreting its prey. A hand (presumably the one from one of the customers) comes out of the faeces to take the pictures of people falling, including Stromae himself. At the end of the clip, another similar-looking blue bird comes to sing at the window of Stromae's sister's room, who strikes his cell phone, bookending the video.

== Charts ==
2015 weekly chart performance for "Carmen"
Chart (2021)	Peak position
Belgium (Ultratop 50 Flanders)	31
Belgium (Ultratop 50 Wallonia)	46
France (SNEP)	67
Netherlands (Dutch Top 40 Tipparade)	11

2016 weekly chart performance for "Carmen"
Chart (2021)	Peak position
France (SNEP)	98

== Certifications ==
Certifications and sales for "Carmen"
Region	Certification	Certified units/sales
France (SNEP)	Platinum	200,000^{‡}
^{‡} Sales+streaming figures based on certification alone.
