= Ta fête =

2014 single by Stromae

Single by Stromae

from the album Racine carrée
- Released: 3 February 2014
- Genre: Dance-pop; electro house; Afropop
- Length: 2:57
- Label: Mosaert; Mercury
- Songwriter: Stromae
- Producers: Stromae; Shameboy (Luuk Cox); Thomas Azier

Stromae singles chronology
"Tous les mêmes" (2013)	"Ta fête" (2014)	"Ave Cesaria" (2014)

"Ta fête" (French for Your Party) is a song by Belgian singer Stromae. On 3 February 2014 it was released as the fourth single from his second studio album Racine carrée where it appears as the opening track. On 17 March 2014 it was announced that it would become the official song for the Belgian football selection at the 2014 World Cup. An official music video for the song was also released by Stromae official Vevo channel.

== Promotion ==
=== Music video ===
The music video was directed by Lieven Van Baelen and released on YouTube on 17 June 2014. Stromae takes on the role of the ring announcer as a man is selected among the spectator crowd to run through and escape a raised obstacle course reminiscent of both The Hunger Games and The Maze Runner.

== Chart positions ==
=== Weekly charts ===
2013 weekly chart performance for "Ta fête"
Chart (2013)	Peak position
Belgium (Ultratop 50 Wallonia)	29
France (SNEP)	70

2014 weekly chart performance for "Ta fête"
Chart (2014)	Peak position
Belgium (Ultratop 50 Flanders)	6
Belgium Dance (Ultratop Flanders)	2
Belgium (Ultratop 50 Wallonia)	2
Belgium Dance (Ultratop Wallonia)	1
France (SNEP)	30
Netherlands (Dutch Top 40)	22
Netherlands (Single Top 100)	45

=== Year-end charts ===
Chart (2014)	Position
Belgium (Ultratop Flanders)	18
Belgium (Ultratop Wallonia)	11
France (SNEP)	107

== Certifications ==
Certifications and sales for "Ta fête"
Region	Certification	Certified units/sales
Belgium (BRMA)	Platinum	20,000^{*}
Canada (Music Canada)	Gold	40,000^{‡}
France (SNEP)	Platinum	200,000^{‡}
^{*} Sales figures based on certification alone.^{‡} Sales+streaming figures based on certification alone.

== Other versions ==
- Dirty Loops recorded a cover version of this song in 2014
