= Thomas Azier =

Dutch pop singer and musician

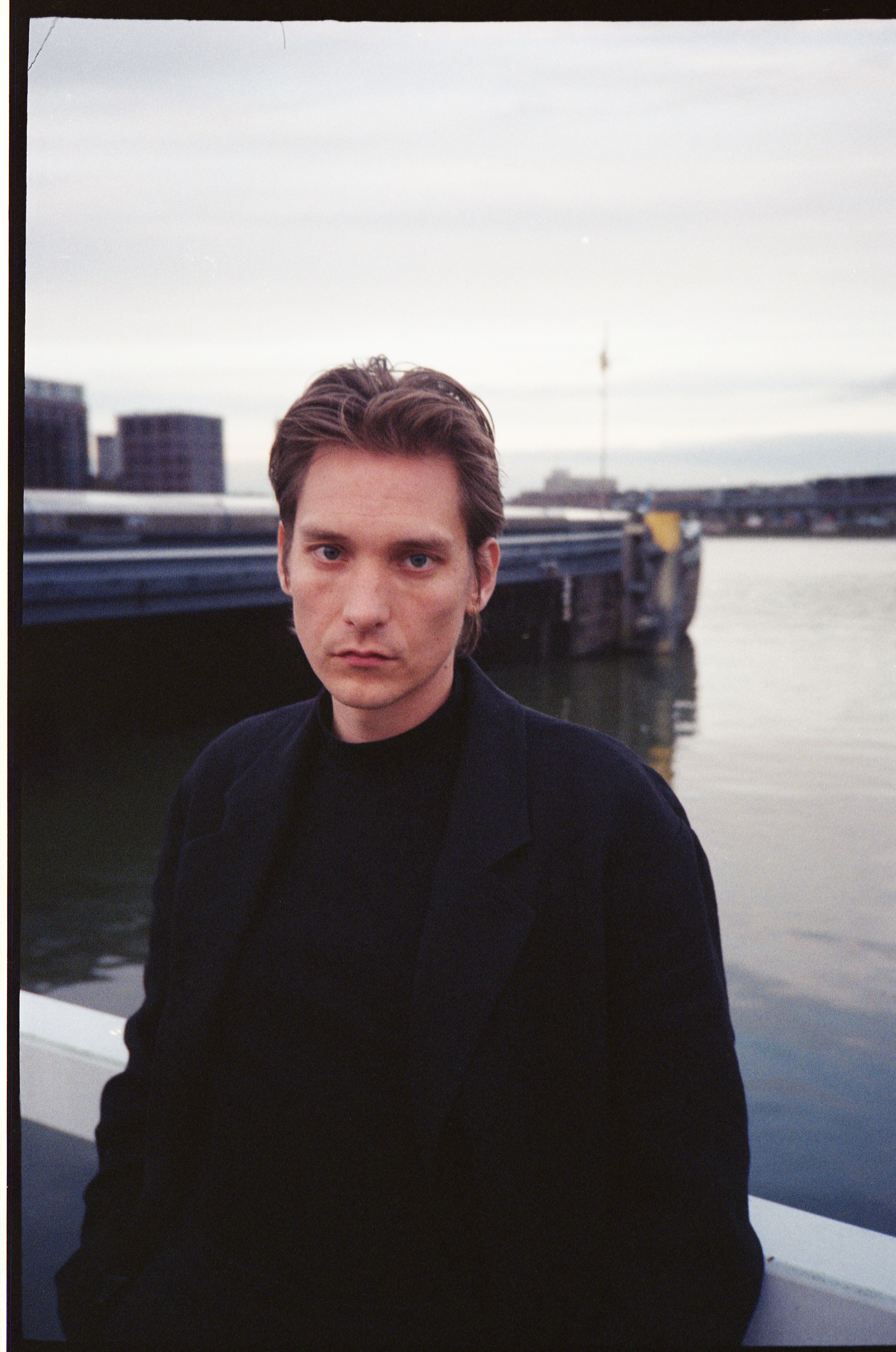
- Thomas Azier in 2020

Background information
- Born: 14 August 1987 (age 39); Leiderdorp, Netherlands
- Genres: Pop
- Occupations: Musician, singer
- Years active: 2008–present
- Labels: Hylas Records; Mercury Records
- Website: www.thomasazier.com

Thomas Azier (born in Leiderdorp, Netherlands, on 14 August 1987) is a Dutch avant-pop singer and composer.

Azier studied at the Academie voor Popcultuur in Leeuwarden in 2005. At age 19, he moved to Berlin, Germany, where he performed in various night venues. In 2012, he released two EPs, Hylas 001 and Hylas 002 on his own Hylas Records label which led to a deal with Universal Music France (Island France / Mercury Music Group). In 2015 he received an Edison award for his debut album Hylas and in 2018 for Rouge.

== Debut album Hylas ==
In 2014, he had his first studio album Hylas released, the result of five years of work. It has charted in the Netherlands, France and Belgium. The album became Album of the Week at VPRO's 3VOOR12 in Holland and the single Red Eyes became Single of the Week at iTunes. Another single from the album - Ghostcity - was featured in the series Lucifer.

Azier also co-wrote and produced several songs on the album Racine Carrée by the Belgian singer Stromae and as a solo artist he provided the support acts during Stromae's tour and several shows of Woodkid.

== Rouge, Stray & Raven On The First Floor ==
In 2017, Azier released his second studio album Rouge, which featured the successful radio singles Talk To Me and Gold.

The music on the album Stray, 2018, was composed and produced fully on the move. Stray was released independently on Azier's label Hylas Records. The song Vertigo was released as a single. Echoes, White Horses and Hymn became live favourites.

The EP Raven On The First Floor was released in May 2019, featuring the singles Map Of Your Loneliness and Strangling Song. On the EP Thomas collaborated with experimental guitar player Obi Blanche for the first time.

== Love, Disorderly, A Collection Of Broken Ideas & The Inventory Of Our Desire ==
The album Love, Disorderly was released on Hylas Records on 12 June 2020. Preceded by the short films Love, Disorderly, Entertainment and Hold On Tight. Thomas' version of Gala' 1997 hit Freed From Desire was featured on the album as well.

In 2021 - during the pandemic - the meditative A Collection Of Broken Ideas was released, a more 40-minute, largely instrumental piece, divided into Side A and Side B. About the piece Thomas wrote: "Recorded at my home studio over the past year, these compositions kept me company when making music with others was impossible. I searched for space in my music and these ideas gave me hope. Now I hope it can do the same for you".

During his club tour in October 2022, Azier announced a new album to be released in February 2023. Preceded by the singles Faces, Blister & Skin, Pelechian & What Does It Mean To Be Free, of which he said 'it's a song that questions my associations with the word 'Freedom' and how it is being used and abused.'

The Inventory Of Our Desire was released on February 10, accompanied by the single Invisible. On March 17 an acoustic first take demo of Invisible was released digitally. OOR Magazine called it a "beautiful album from a musician who is developing interestingly."

In March 2023, Azier performed music from his albums Love, Disorderly and The Inventory Of Our Desire at the Grasnapolsky Festival with the Noordpool Orkest.

== Zonder Titel & Live Recording EP's, music for The Equalizer 3 ==
On May 19, the instrumental EP Zonder Titel was released with the pieces Cy's Dance, Anna Goes To London and Permuto.

Azier's 2020 track Love, Disorderly was used in the movie The Equalizer 3, directed by Antoine Fuqua and starring Denzel Washington. He also co-wrote and performed the piece Nine Seconds for the movie.

On October 6 the 7-track EP Live Recording was released digitally, featuring songs from The Inventory Of Our Desire, as well as the track Love, Disorderly. Performed live by Azier with the Noordpool Orchestra. Peter van der Heide from Dagblad van het Noorden gave the concert a 5 star review saying: In 70 minutes a masterful, compelling and atmospheric concert was delivered that effortlessly held the attention from Hold On Tight to the closing Only The Ocean.

== Discography ==
=== Albums ===
Year	Album	Peak positions			
Year	Album	NED	BEL (Fl)	BEL (Wa)	FRA
2014	Hylas	24	144	60	57
2017	Rouge	18	137	168	82
2018	Stray		101		
2020	Love, Disorderly				
2021	A Collection Of Broken Ideas				
2023	The Inventory Of Our Desire				

=== EPs ===
- Hylas 001 (2012)
- Hylas 002 (2013)
- Live At Studio Davout, Paris (2017)
- S t r a y (2018)
- Raven On The First Floor (2019)
- Too Much Entertainment (Remixes) (2020)
- A Collection Of Broken Ideas (2021)
- Zonder Titel (2023)
- Live Recording (with Noordpool Orchestra) (2023)

=== Singles ===
Year	Single	Peak positions			
Year	Single	NED	BEL (Fl)	BEL (Wa)	FRA
2012	"Red Eyes"				79
2013	"Ghostcity"				
2016	"Talk To Me"		Tip		
2017	"Gold"			Tip	
2018	"Hymn"				
2018	"Vertigo"				
2019	"Strangling Song"				
2020	"Entertainment"				
2020	"Hold On Tight"				
2021	"Buryatia"				
2022	"Skin & Blister"				
2022	"Sick Loop Lover"				
2022	"Pelechian"				
2022	"Faces"				
2023	"What Does It Mean To Be Free"				
2023	"Invisible"				

== Videography ==
- Red Eyes – Directed by Sander Houtkruijer
- Angelene – Directed by Sander Houtkruijer
- Ghostcity – Directed by Sander Houtkruijer
- Verwandlung – Directed by Sander Houtkruijer
- Love, Disorderly – Directed by Laurent Chanez
- Winners – Directed by Ellen Treasure
- Entertainment – Directed by Nils Edström
- Hold On Tight – Directed by Ayoto Ateraxia
- Donder – Directed by Jesper Boot
- What Does It Mean To Be Free – Directed by Jesper Boot
