= Formidable (song) =

2013 single by Stromae

Single by Stromae

from the album Racine carrée
- Released: 4 June 2013
- Recorded: 2012
- Length: 3:34
- Label: Mosaert; Mercury
- Songwriter: Stromae

Stromae singles chronology
| "Papaoutai" (2013) | "Formidable" (2013) | "Tous les mêmes" (2013) |

Music video
- "Formidable (ceci n'est pas une leçon)" on YouTube

"Formidable" (translated in English also as formidable, synonym of tremendous, impressive) is a song written and produced by Belgian singer Stromae. The song was released as a digital download in Belgium on 4 June 2013 as the second single from his second studio album Racine carrée (2013). The song entered at the number 1 spot the week of its release in Belgium and reached number 1 in France. It was his most financially successful single since "Alors on Danse" in 2009.

== Music video ==
Route scheme in the music video

On 21 May 2013, amateur videos surfaced on YouTube showing Stromae apparently drunk and wandering at the Louise/Louiza tram and metro station in Brussels during the daybreak, which eventually went viral. It was revealed days later that the incident was part of the taping for a music video; this was confirmed during the TV programme Ce soir (ou jamais!) on France 2 in which Stromae discussed and also performed "Formidable", which is about the story of a drunk man just separated from his girlfriend.

The video, taken by cameras hidden around the station, appears to show a drunken, disheveled, and distraught Stromae stumbling around the station, shouting snatches of the song's lyrics at passersby, falling down, and on several occasions appearing on the verge of stepping into traffic. Onlookers are shown recording the incident with their cellphones, but only one person intervenes to prevent Stromae from sitting in the path of an oncoming tram. The music cuts off abruptly as three policemen, unaware that this is a taping, approach Stromae to assess his wellness and to inquire if he has been drinking. Stromae reassures them, and the video resumes. In the video's final scene, Stromae leaves, followed by his camera crew, and displays that his drunkenness was only an act by grinning into the camera, straightening his clothing, and clicking his heels. The video is subtitled "ceci n'est pas une leçon" ("this is not a lesson").

The video won the award for the "Music video of the year" category at the 2014 Victoires de la Musique.

== Track listing ==
Digital download
| No. | Title | Length |
|---|---|---|
| 1. | "Formidable" | 3:34 |

== Charts and certifications ==
=== Weekly charts ===
2013–2014 weekly chart performance for "Formidable"
| Chart (2013–2014) | Peak position |
|---|---|
| Austria (Ö3 Austria Top 40) | 36 |
| Belgium (Ultratop 50 Flanders) | 1 |
| Belgium (Ultratop Flanders Urban) | 1 |
| Belgium (Ultratop 50 Wallonia) | 1 |
| Denmark (Tracklisten) | 20 |
| France (SNEP) | 1 |
| Germany (GfK) | 39 |
| Italy (FIMI) | 16 |
| Netherlands (Dutch Top 40) | 4 |
| Netherlands (Single Top 100) | 2 |
| Switzerland (Schweizer Hitparade) | 13 |
| Switzerland (Media Control Romandy) | 1 |

2023–2025 weekly chart performance for "Formidable"
| Chart (2023–2025) | Peak position |
|---|---|
| Israel International Airplay (Media Forest) | 20 |
| Poland (Polish Streaming Top 100) | 70 |

=== Year-end charts ===
Year-end chart performance for "Formidable"
| Chart (2013) | Position |
|---|---|
| Belgium (Ultratop Flanders) | 7 |
| Belgium (Ultratop Wallonia) | 2 |
| France (SNEP) | 5 |
| Netherlands (Dutch Top 40) | 85 |
| Netherlands (Single Top 100) | 55 |
| Switzerland (Schweizer Hitparade) | 59 |
| Chart (2014) | Position |
| Belgium (Ultratop Flanders) | 63 |
| Belgium (Ultratop Wallonia) | 48 |
| France (SNEP) | 42 |

=== Certifications ===
Certifications for "Formidable"
| Region | Certification | Certified units/sales |
|---|---|---|
| Austria (IFPI Austria) | Gold | 15,000^{*} |
| Belgium (BRMA) | 3× Platinum | 60,000^{*} |
| Canada (Music Canada) | Platinum | 80,000^{‡} |
| Denmark (IFPI Danmark) | Platinum | 90,000^{‡} |
| France (SNEP) | Diamond | 309,800 |
| Germany (BVMI) | Gold | 300,000^{‡} |
| Italy (FIMI) | Platinum | 30,000^{*} |
| Switzerland (IFPI Switzerland) | Platinum | 30,000^{^} |
^{*} Sales figures based on certification alone.^{^} Shipments figures based on certification alone.^{‡} Sales+streaming figures based on certification alone.

== Release history ==
Release dates and formats for "Formidable"
| Region | Date | Format(s) | Label(s) | Ref. |
|---|---|---|---|---|
| Belgium | 1 June 2013 | Digital download | Mosaert | |

== Cheyenne Toney cover ==
"Formidable"

Single by Cheyenne Toney
- Released: 6 December 2013
- Genre: Hip hop; R&B
- Length: 3:34
- Label: 8ball
- Songwriters: Stromae; Toney

On 6 December 2013, during the fourth live show of the fourth season of the Dutch television programme The Voice of Holland, Dutch singer Cheyenne Toney performed a cover of "Formidable". She sang her own written cover, with lyrics translated from French to Dutch. Her version of the song reached the peak position in the Mega Single Top 100 (charting higher than the original) and the eighteenth position in the Dutch Top 40.

=== Charts ===
2013 weekly chart performance for "Formidable" (Cheyenne Toney version)
| Chart (2013) | Peak position |
|---|---|
| Netherlands (Dutch Top 40) | 18 |
| Netherlands (Single Top 100) | 1 |

=== Year-end charts ===
Year-end chart performance for "Formidable" (Cheyenne Toney version)
| Chart (2013) | Position |
|---|---|
| Netherlands (Dutch Top 40) | 156 |

== Arabic version ==
A Maghrebi Arabic version of the song by Moroccan Canadian performer Nadia Essadiqi was an internet hit in October 2015. On 17 November, she went on to perform the song live on the VivaCité radio chart show Tip Top and on Le Petit Journal (Canal+).

== Noam Bettan cover ==
On 17 January 2026, Israeli singer Noam Bettan performed the song during the thirty-second episode of the twelfth season of the Israeli reality singing competition HaKokhav HaBa. This version peaked at number 71 on the official Mako Hitlist Israeli Chart.

=== Charts ===
Chart performance for "Formidable" (Noam Bettan version)
| Chart (2026) | Peak position |
|---|---|
| Israel (Mako Hitlist) | 71 |
