= XOV (musician) =

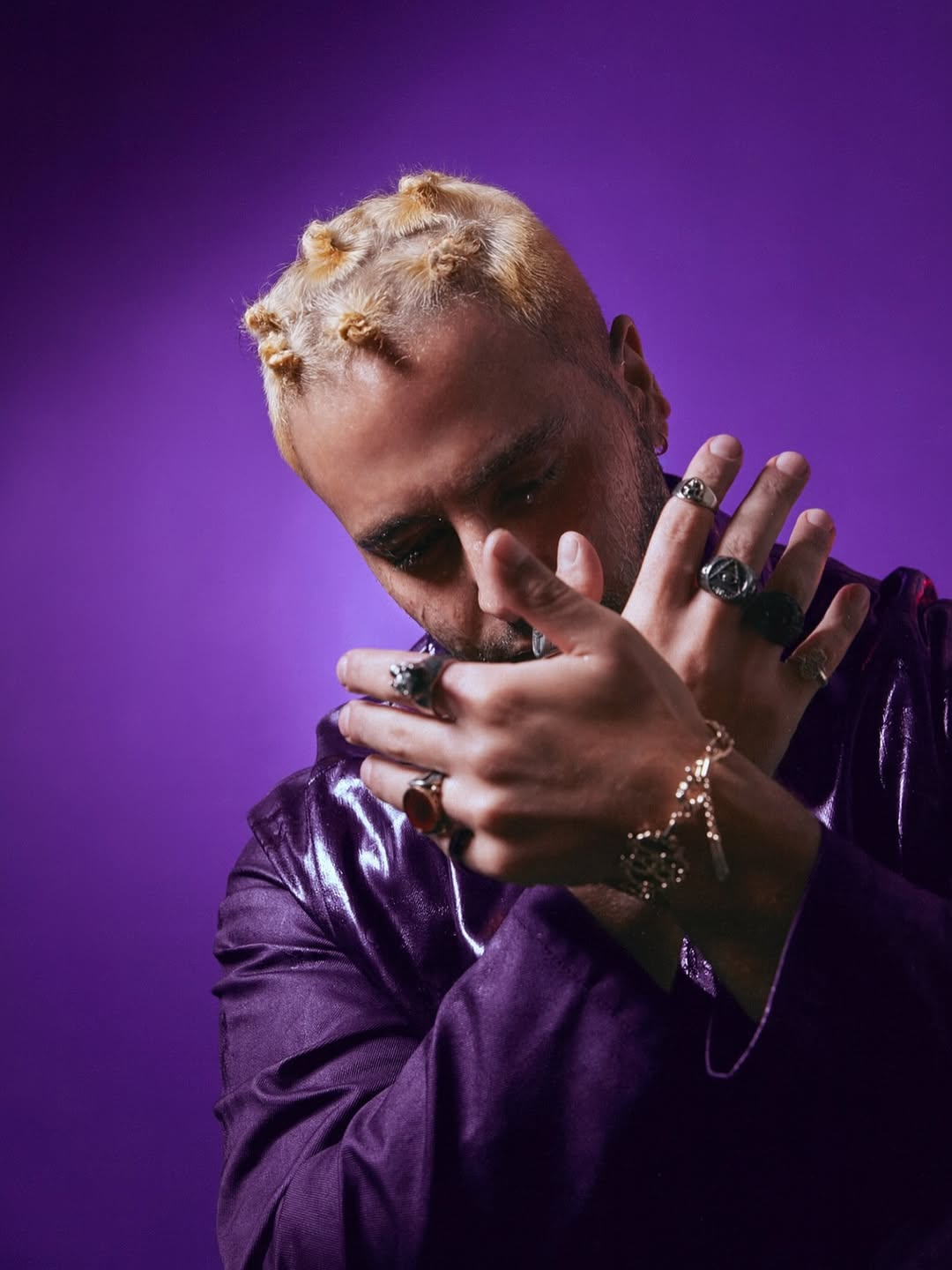
- XOV photographed in 2020

Background information
- Born: Damian Ardestani; November 28, 1985 (age 40); Tehran, Iran
- Origin: Stockholm, Sweden
- Genres: Pop; R&B; Hip hop
- Occupations: Singer; Songwriter; Rapper; Record producer; Artist
- Instrument: Vocals
- Years active: 2012–present
- Labels: Sony Music Scandinavia; Universal Music Europe
- Website: www.xovofficial.com

Damian Ardestani (born 28 November 1985), known professionally as XOV, is an Iranian-born Swedish artist, singer, songwriter and record producer. His music has accumulated hundreds of millions of streams worldwide and has achieved chart placements in several European countries, including Sweden and Germany. He gained international attention when New Zealand artist Lorde selected his song "Animal" for The Hunger Games: Mockingjay – Part 1.

== Early life ==
Ardestani was born in Tehran and moved to Sweden at a young age. He grew up in the Stockholm suburb Tensta and began writing poetry during childhood. He later became active in Stockholm’s independent music scene, writing and producing his own material.

== Career ==
XOV began releasing music independently in the early 2010s. In 2014, Lorde discovered his work and contacted him, leading to the inclusion of "Animal" on the soundtrack for The Hunger Games: Mockingjay – Part 1.

He has appeared on Swedish television, including TV4’s Nyhetsmorgon and SVT’s Go'kväll. Internationally, he performed on the German ZDF programme zdf@bauhaus.

XOV has performed extensively in Europe, including concerts in Stockholm, Gothenburg, Berlin, London and Oslo. In 2015, he headlined a show at the Kantine stage of Berlin’s Berghain club. He also played in New York City at Brooklyn Bar during the same period.

His music has also been featured in international television formats, including performances on versions of The Voice and The X Factor.

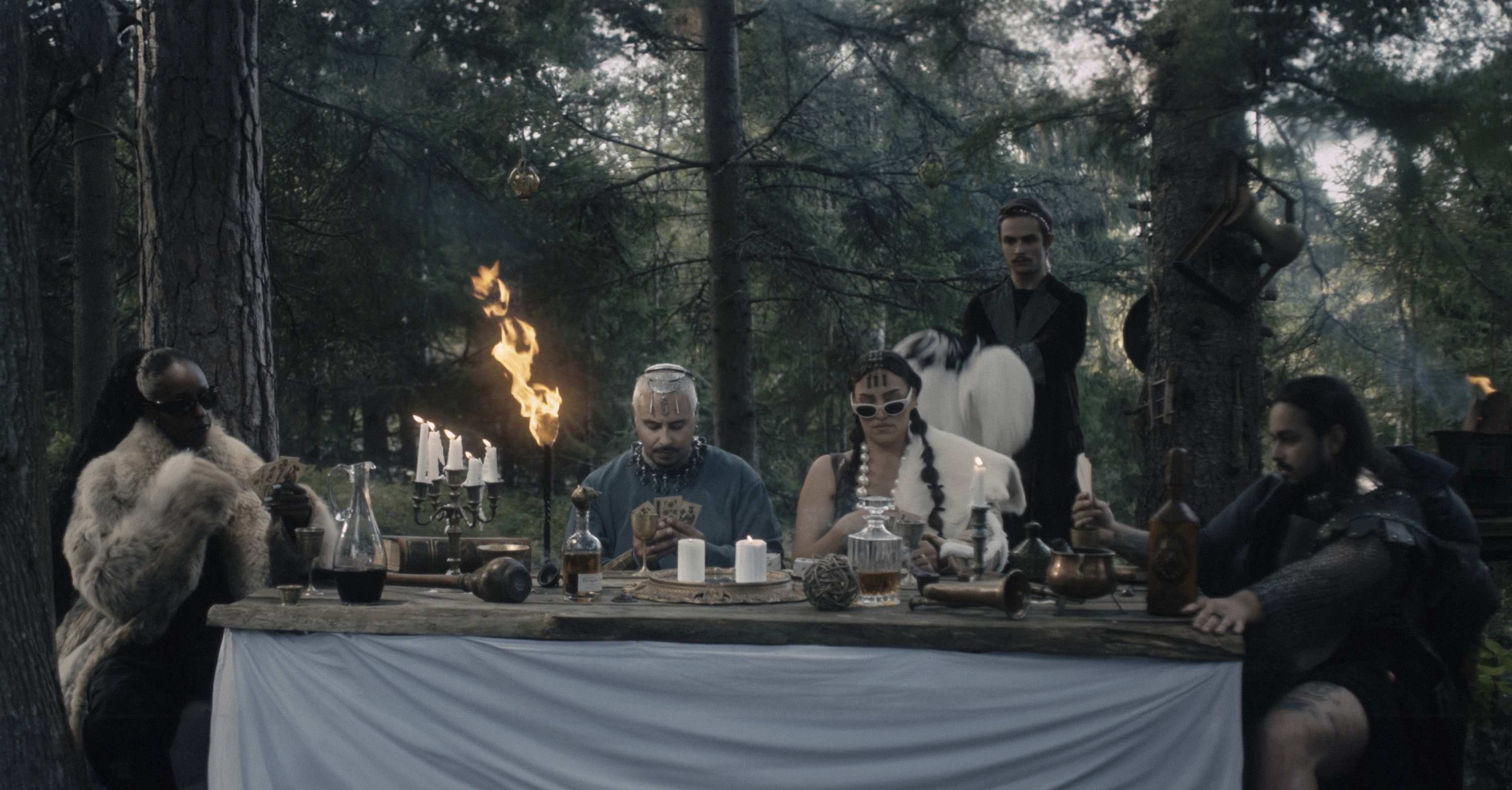
XOV in the music video for "Oh My Gosh"

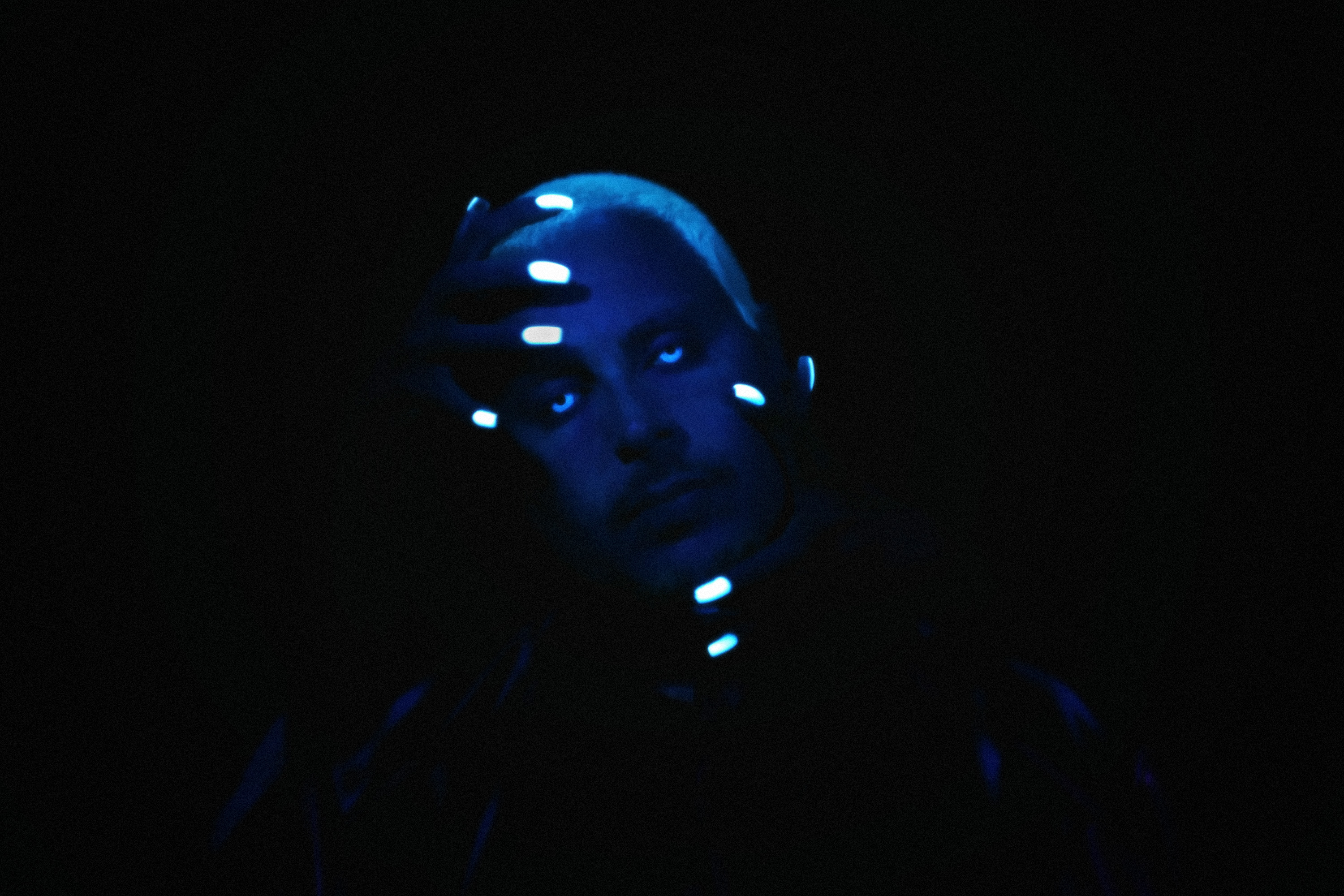
XOV in the music video for "Oh My Gosh"

== Humanitarian work ==
In 2015, Ardestani co-founded the organisation I AM YOU , which coordinated more than 1,000 volunteers supporting refugees on the Greek island of Lesbos between 2015 and 2019. In 2017, he participated in a panel on human rights and refugee issues at Stanford University’s Center for Human Rights and International Justice.

He later founded Creators Society, an art and human-rights initiative developed with Human Rights Watch. In 2024, he contributed to the first-ever fashion show held inside the European Parliament, an event addressing modern slavery, in collaboration with designer Louise Xin.

== Surrealium ==
In 2023, Ardestani founded Surrealium, an art and jewellery atelier located at Vaxholm Fortress in the Stockholm archipelago.

== Personal life ==
According to Aftonbladet, Ardestani lives on an island near Vaxholm in the Stockholm archipelago.

== Discography ==
=== Albums ===
Year	Album	SWE
2015	Wild	42

=== EPs ===
Year	EP
2014	Lucifer – EP
2018	Nebula – EP
2020	Yin Yang – EP
2022	Wildest Dreams – EP

=== Selected singles ===
- "Lucifer" (2015) – SWE #46; GER #32
- "Animal" (2014)
- "Boys Don’t Cry" (2014)
- "Somliga går med trasiga skor" (2019) – Cornelis Vreeswijk cover
- "My Way" (2024)
- "Trouble in Paradise" (2024)
- "Black Eyes" (2023)
- "Oh My Gosh (Radio Edit)" (2023)
