= Tous les mêmes =

2013 single by Stromae

Single by Stromae

from the album Racine carrée
- Released: 23 September 2013
- Recorded: February 2013
- Genre: Electro swing; pop
- Length: 3:30
- Label: Mosaert; Mercury
- Songwriter: Stromae
- Producers: Stromae; Bart Maris

Stromae singles chronology
"Formidable" (2013)	"Tous les mêmes" (2013)	"Ta fête" (2014)

Music video
- "Tous les mêmes" on YouTube

"Tous les mêmes" (French for '[they are] all the same') is a song by Belgian singer Stromae, released on 23 September 2013. The song has peaked at number one on music charts in both Belgium and France.

== Music video ==
The music video, directed by Henry Scholfield, was released on YouTube on 18 December 2013 and features Stromae partly dressed as a woman. The track shows the life of a female Stromae, annoyed as she is with the attitude of men and what they do. Throughout the video, Stromae depicts various stereotypical remarks women make about men, accompanied by the non-verbal cues the other characters in the video make. However, when he switches to his other side, which represents men, various stereotypical remarks that men make about women and relationships get expressed as well. The lighting effects in the video (green light for male Stromae, pink light for female Stromae) aid the interpretation of the song. The video has received over 495 million views as of May 14, 2026.

== Chart positions ==
=== Weekly charts ===
Weekly chart performance for "Tous les mêmes"
Chart (2013–2018)	Peak position
Belarus Airplay (Eurofest)	196
Belgium (Ultratop 50 Flanders)	4
Belgium (Ultratop Flanders Urban)	2
Belgium (Ultratop 50 Wallonia)	1
CIS Airplay (TopHit)	9
Czech Republic Airplay (ČNS IFPI)	45
Czech Republic Singles Digital (ČNS IFPI)	88
Denmark (Tracklisten)	10
France (SNEP)	1
Hungary (Single Top 40)	19
Italy (FIMI)	5
Netherlands (Dutch Top 40)	22
Netherlands (Single Top 100)	29
Russia Airplay (TopHit)	10
Switzerland (Schweizer Hitparade)	27
Switzerland (Media Control Romandy)	5
Ukraine Airplay (TopHit)	14

=== Year-end charts ===
2013 year-end chart performance for "Tous les mêmes"
Chart (2013)	Position
Belgium (Ultratop Flanders)	94
Belgium (Ultratop Wallonia)	50
France (SNEP)	40

2014 year-end chart performance for "Tous les mêmes"
Chart (2014)	Position
Belgium (Ultratop Flanders)	51
Belgium (Ultratop Wallonia)	24
France (SNEP)	32
Italy (FIMI)	28
Netherlands (Dutch Top 40)	90
Netherlands (Single Top 100)	95
Russia Airplay (TopHit)	117
Ukraine Airplay (TopHit)	71

== Certifications ==
Region	Certification	Certified units/sales
Austria (IFPI Austria)	Gold	15,000^{*}
Belgium (BRMA)	Platinum	20,000^{*}
Canada (Music Canada)	Platinum	80,000^{‡}
France (SNEP)	Diamond	333,333^{‡}
Italy (FIMI)	2× Platinum	60,000^{*}
Spain (Promusicae)	Gold	30,000^{‡}
Streaming
Denmark (IFPI Danmark)	Gold	1,300,000^{†}
^{*} Sales figures based on certification alone.^{‡} Sales+streaming figures based on certification alone.^{†} Streaming-only figures based on certification alone.

== Cover versions ==
Angélina Nava performed the song during the final of the 2017 season of the French TV series The Voice Kids, later going on to win the show.
