= Papaoutai =

2013 single by Stromae

Single by Stromae

from the album Racine carrée
- Released: 13 May 2013
- Recorded: 2012
- Genre: Eurodance; Congolese rumba
- Length: 3:53
- Label: Mosaert; Vertigo
- Songwriter: Stromae
- Producers: Stromae, Dizzy Mandjeku, Aron Ottignon

Stromae singles chronology
"Je cours" (2010)	"Papaoutai" (2013)	"Formidable" (2013)

Music video
- "Papaoutai" on YouTube

"Papaoutai" (Papa, où t'es?, pronounced [papa u te]; Belgian French for 'Dad, where are you?', stylised in lowercase) is a song written and performed by Belgian singer Stromae. The song was released as a digital download in Belgium on 13 May 2013 as the lead single from his second studio album Racine carrée (2013). The song peaked at number one in Belgium and France and became the best-selling single of 2013 in Belgium. A remix of the song featuring Angel Haze also appears on the album.

The song was performed live at the 2013 NRJ Music Awards, where it featured American rapper will.i.am. The song is also featured on the 2014 dancing game Just Dance 2015 for PAL regions and is available as DLC for NTSC regions.

The song was the most viewed French-speaking song on YouTube until 2023, when it was passed by Indila's song "Dernière danse" (English: "Last dance").

It became the second French-language video to pass 1 billion views on 27 August 2023.

== Music video ==
The music video accompanying the release of "Papaoutai" was directed by Adam Nael and released on YouTube on 6 June 2013 at a total length of three minutes and fifty-two seconds. The video shows a young boy (played by Karl Ruben Noel) trying to interact with his father (played by Stromae), who sits motionless, his expression and body resembling that of a mannequin. Father and son are dressed in identical outfits consisting of garishly patterned aqua shirts and shorts, knee socks, and orange bowtie. The video has the ambiance and decor of the 1950s. The boy looks longingly through the window at other parents and children who likewise wear matching outfits that identify them as pairs: a mother and daughter dressed similarly to Dorothy Gale in The Wizard of Oz do a dance while walking their identical dogs; a garbageman and his son collect rubbish together while doing another dance; while still another father (played by Ceasare "Tight Eyez" Willis, one of the creators of Krumping) does an aggressive, threatening dance at his reluctant son before the boy finally begins to imitate him.

Frustrated, the son does various dances in front of his own father until one of his efforts provokes the father to smile. Outside, father and son do their own dance together, but it is soon revealed that the boy is dancing alone and his father is still stiff and unresponsive. In frustration, the son joins Stromae on the sofa, assuming a rigid, lifeless position identical to his father's.

The song and video refer to the absence of Stromae's father—who had little presence in Stromae's life even before being killed in the 1994 Rwandan genocide—and to Stromae's fear of being unable to be an effective father with no memory of ever having a father of his own. As of August 2023, the video has received over 1 billion views on YouTube.

== Lyrics and meaning ==
The title of the song is an intentionally misspelled form of the phrase Papa, où t'es?, which translates as "Dad, where are you?"

The lyrics of the song are about Stromae's father, who was killed in the 1994 Rwandan genocide.

== Track listing ==
Digital download
No.	Title	Length
1.	"Papaoutai"	3:51
2.	"Papaoutai" (Extended)	6:18
3.	"Papaoutai" (Mystique Remix)	5:01
4.	"Papaoutai" (Nicolaz Remix)	5:52
5.	"Papaoutai" (Liam Summers Remix)	4:04

== Charts ==
=== Weekly charts ===
Weekly chart performance
Chart (2013–2026)	Peak position
Austria (Ö3 Austria Top 40)	3
Belgium (Ultratop 50 Flanders)	3
Belgium (Ultratop Flanders Dance)	7
Belgium (Ultratop Flanders Urban)	1
Belgium (Ultratop 50 Wallonia)	1
Belgium (Ultratop Wallonia Dance)	1
Canada Hot 100 (Billboard)	70
CIS Airplay (TopHit)	2
Czech Republic Airplay (ČNS IFPI)	10
Euro Digital Song Sales (Billboard)	12
Finland (Suomen virallinen lista)	4
Finland Airplay (Radiosoittolista)	14
France (SNEP)	1
Germany (GfK)	6
Greece International (IFPI)	38
Hungary (Single Top 40)	29
Israel International Airplay (Media Forest)	8
Italy (FIMI)	10
Kazakhstan Airplay (TopHit)	81
Lebanon (Lebanese Top 20)	14
Luxembourg Digital Songs (Billboard)	2
Netherlands (Dutch Top 40)	2
Netherlands (Single Top 100)	2
Romania (Romanian Top 100)	83
Russia Airplay (TopHit)	2
Slovenia Airplay (SloTop50)	26
Spain (Promusicae)	36
Switzerland (Schweizer Hitparade)	4
Switzerland (Media Control Romandy)	2
Ukraine Airplay (TopHit)	1
US Hot Dance/Electronic Songs (Billboard)	25

=== Year-end charts ===
2013 year-end chart performance
Chart (2013)	Position
Austria (Ö3 Austria Top 40)	44
Belgium (Ultratop Flanders)	9
Belgium (Ultratop Wallonia)	1
France (SNEP)	3
Germany (Media Control AG)	43
Netherlands (Dutch Top 40)	11
Netherlands (Single Top 100)	6
Russia Airplay (TopHit)	56
Switzerland (Schweizer Hitparade)	22
Ukraine Airplay (TopHit)	83

2014 year-end chart performance
Chart (2014)	Position
Belgium (Ultratop Flanders)	57
Belgium (Ultratop Wallonia)	34
France (SNEP)	36
Italy (FIMI)	36
Netherlands (Single Top 100)	72
Russia Airplay (TopHit)	121
Switzerland (Schweizer Hitparade)	36
Ukraine Airplay (TopHit)	150
US Hot Dance/Electronic Songs (Billboard)	87

2015 year-end chart performance
Chart (2015)	Position
France (SNEP)	156

== Certifications ==
Certifications and sales
Region	Certification	Certified units/sales
Austria (IFPI Austria)	2× Platinum	60,000^{*}
Belgium (BRMA)	3× Platinum	60,000^{*}
Brazil (Pro-Música Brasil)	Gold	30,000^{*}
Canada (Music Canada)	3× Platinum	240,000^{‡}
Denmark (IFPI Danmark)	Platinum	90,000^{‡}
France (SNEP)	Diamond	976,000
Germany (BVMI)	3× Gold	900,000^{‡}
Italy (FIMI)	2× Platinum	60,000^{*}
Netherlands (NVPI)	Platinum	20,000^{^}
Spain (Promusicae)	Platinum	60,000^{‡}
Switzerland (IFPI Switzerland)	2× Platinum	60,000^{^}
United Kingdom (BPI)	Silver	200,000^{‡}
United States (RIAA)	Gold	500,000^{‡}
Streaming
Denmark (IFPI Danmark) Streaming	Gold	1,300,000^{†}
Greece (IFPI Greece)	Gold	1,000,000^{†}
^{*} Sales figures based on certification alone.^{^} Shipments figures based on certification alone.^{‡} Sales+streaming figures based on certification alone.^{†} Streaming-only figures based on certification alone.

== Release history ==
Release history
Region	Date	Format	Label
Belgium	13 May 2013	Digital download	Mosaert

== Covers and parody ==
American a cappella group Pentatonix and violinist Lindsey Stirling covered the song on Pentatonix's album PTX Vol. 3, released on 23 September 2014.

Erza Muqoli performed this song with self-accompaniment on piano for her audition for the ninth season (2014–2015) of the French television show La France a un incroyable talent.

Lamaoutai (Llama, where are you?) is a spoof created in November 2013 about the kidnapping of Serge the Llama from a circus in Bordeaux.

Emploioutai (Job, where are you?) is a parody of the song performed by Les Guignols in 2013 to mock the unfulfilled promises of French President François Hollande regarding diminution of unemployment, with the Hollande's puppet searching for jobs in absurd locations within the Élysée Palace.

Letícia Carvalho covered the song on The Voice Portugal on 11 October 2015.

Alexandre Heitz performed the song on The Voice of Germany on 2 October 2018.

Kenza Blanka covered the song on series 8 of The Voice UK on 9 February 2019, singing it in English and Arabic and French.

Dutch singer Froukje Veenstra covered the song with a Dutch addition on 10 June 2020, for the '3FM Live Box' showcase on YouTube, rapping about the needs of those with or without a father, meanwhile giving personal thanks for her own father.

Dutch rapper Joost Klein namedrops "Papaoutai" in his song "Europapa", which was sent to represent the Netherlands in the Eurovision Song Contest 2024, before being disqualified ahead of the Grand Final after performing in the Semi-Finals. Much like Stromae himself, Klein's father also died when he was a child.

Spanish singer Téyou performed the show on Opeación Triunfo on 20 October 2025.

=== mikeeysmind and Chill77 cover ===
"Papaoutai (Afro Soul)"

Song by mikeeysmind, Chill77
- Released: December 20, 2025
- Length: 4:39
- Label: Unjaps AB · Mosaert Label SRL · Universal Music Group
- Songwriter: Paul Van Haver · Aron Ottignon · Pierre Lengo
- Producers: mikeeysmind; Chill77; Mats Kedrren; Unjaps

"Papaoutai (Afro Soul)" is a remix by mikeeysmind and Chill77, released through Swedish label Unjaps AB on December 20, 2025. It is an AI-generated cover of the original song. The track was uploaded to YouTube on January 9, 2026, after which it went viral.

The song became one of the most viral tracks of early 2026. In January, it was the highest new entry on the Global Spotify charts, debuting at #168 with 1.29 million streams. In the week of January 24, 2026, it debuted at #2 on the Billboard World Digital Song Sales and #172 on the Billboard Global 200. The song accumulated over 14 million Spotify streams within its first month. Its corresponding TikTok sound plays in over 235,000 posts as of January 2026.

As of February 11, 2026, the track was distributed by Universal Music Group.

==== Viral spread and controversy ====
The cover's viral spread was significantly amplified by videos featuring Congolese-Russian singer Arsene Mukendi appearing to perform the track. Mukendi, who had previously placed fourth on season 8 of The Voice Russia, posted multiple videos of himself lip-syncing to the AI-generated vocals without initially disclosing that the voice was artificial.

Initial media coverage misidentified Mukendi's performance as him singing vocals over the instrumental track. On January 12, 2026, Mukendi clarified on Instagram that the vocals were AI-generated, writing "I wanted to put my emotions and my soul on this masterpiece" and apologizing "for the confusion." He credited mikeeysmind as the version's creator and videographer Arsen Dishekov for producing his video.

==== Legal status and rights ====
The French performing rights society SACEM confirmed that the cover is legal, stating "it is not fraud" but rather a cover, as neither the melody nor lyrics were modified from the original. The original writers are properly credited, and royalties from the cover will be paid to Stromae and the original rights holders.

Aron Ottignon, co-composer of the song, stated he recognized it as AI immediately but found "the spirit of the cover interesting" and believed it was "good for" Stromae as it brings renewed attention to the original song. He compared AI in music to the vocoder in the 1970s, calling it "just a new instrument."

Stromae himself has not publicly commented on the cover. Universal Music France, Stromae's distributor, declined to comment.

==== Industry response ====
Swiss public radio SRF declined to play the song in its regular programming despite its chart success, citing unclear origins and editorial guidelines regarding AI-generated content. The French streaming platform Deezer labels the track as "AI-generated content," making it the only major platform to explicitly identify it as such.

==== Reception ====
The song raised ethical concerns particularly because Stromae's original "Papaoutai" is deeply personal, written about his father Pierre Rutare, who was killed during the Rwandan genocide. Tšeliso Monaheng of OkayAfrica questioned "what happens to the idea of art when emotional authenticity becomes optional" in relation to the cover, noting that the track "functions as an aesthetic and emotional stand-in for the original, reproducing its melodic contours, dramatic arc, and vocal affect with remarkable fidelity."

Guillaume Fraissard of Le Monde wrote that "knowing that a work is fake necessarily changes the nature of the emotion it gives us."

Andrew Simire of Trickle Media described the incident as highlighting concerns about whether AI in music removes "the essence or ingredient that makes [art] original, pure, and human-made."

Zaghrah Anthony of Bona Magazine wrote that the cover "stays true to the original’s spirit but transforms it into a slower, more immersive production."

Social media reactions were mixed. Some listeners praised the arrangement, while others criticized it as lacking genuine soul. One Reddit user called it "slop" with "no actual violin, percussion or soul."

==== Charts ====
===== Weekly charts =====
Weekly chart performance for "Papaoutai (Afro Soul)"
Chart (2026)	Peak position
Austria (Ö3 Austria Top 40)	11
Czech Republic Singles Digital (ČNS IFPI)	8
Germany (GfK)	13
Global 200 (Billboard)	66
Greece International (IFPI)	3
Hungary (Single Top 40)	19
Latvia Streaming (LaIPA)	14
Lebanon (Lebanese Top 20)	14
Lithuania (AGATA)	47
Luxembourg (Billboard)	16
Netherlands (Single Top 100)	37
Nigeria (TurnTable Top 100)	7
Poland Streaming (OLiS)	55
Russia Streaming (TopHit)	39
Slovakia Singles Digital (ČNS IFPI)	4
Switzerland (Schweizer Hitparade)	10
Turkey International Airplay (Radiomonitor Türkiye)	1
UK Singles (Official Charts)	68
US World Digital Song Sales (Billboard)	1
Venezuela Anglo Airplay (Monitor Latino)	1

===== Monthly charts =====
Monthly chart performance for "Papaoutai (Afro Soul)"
Chart (2026)	Peak position
Russia Streaming (TopHit)	79

==== Certifications ====
Certifications for "Papaoutai (Afro Soul)"
Region	Certification	Certified units/sales
Brazil (Pro-Música Brasil)	Gold	20,000^{‡}
Streaming
Greece (IFPI Greece)	Gold	1,000,000^{†}
Slovakia (ČNS IFPI)	Gold	850,000
^{†} Streaming-only figures based on certification alone.
