= Racine carrée =

Studio album by Stromae
- Released: 16 August 2013
- Recorded: 2012–2013
- Genres: House; electropop; dance-pop; Congolese rumba
- Length: 45:31
- Language: French
- Labels: Vertigo; Casablanca; Republic; Island France; Mosaert
- Producers: Stromae; Maître Gims; Orelsan; Shameboy; Thomas Azier

Stromae chronology
Cheese (2010)	Racine carrée (2013)	Multitude (2022)

Singles from Racine carrée
- 1. "Papaoutai" Released: 13 May 2013; 2. "Formidable" Released: 27 May 2013; 3. "Tous les mêmes" Released: 23 September 2013; 4. "Ta fête" Released: 3 February 2014; 5. "Ave Cesaria" Released: 21 July 2014; 6. "Carmen" Released: 30 March 2015; 7. "Quand c'est ?" Released: 14 September 2015

Professional ratings
Review scores
Source	Rating
AllMusic	4/5 stars
Charts in France	3.5/5 stars
Metro	4/5 stars
Music Story	4/5 stars
NU.nl	4/5 stars
Télérama	4/4 stars

Racine carrée (French for 'square root', stylised as √) is the second studio album by Belgian musician Stromae. It was released digitally on 16 August 2013 and three days later physically in France and Belgium. Stromae expressed his desire to incorporate Caribbean and African musical influences along with his signature 1990s-inspired dance beats. The album, recorded in an attic, explores themes as diverse as alienation from social networks, relationship issues, discrimination, cigarettes and lung cancer, AIDS and absent father figures. Prior to its official release and afterwards, Racine carrée received critical acclaim for its thoughtful lyrics and gained comparisons to fellow Belgian recording artist Jacques Brel.

The album was a commercial success across Western Europe, including non-francophone countries. Racine carrée topped the charts in France, Belgium, Switzerland, the Netherlands and Italy, as well as reaching the top ten in Canada, and the top forty in Germany. In his native Belgium, it remained at the top the charts for multiple weeks and been certified twelve times platinum by the BEA. In France, the album has been certified quadruple diamond by the SNEP and become one of the highest-selling albums in recent years after amassing over one million copies sold four months after its release. Racine carrée yielded three chart-topping singles: "Papaoutai", "Formidable" and "Tous les mêmes".

== Musical style ==
The French weekly magazine Libre Service Actualités characterized Racine Carrée as featuring "tribal rhythms, Congolese guitars and Caribbean vibes", adding that the album "recalls the singer's origins". In an October 2011 interview with Les Inrockuptibles, Stromae said that his next album would feature "Afro influences, heavy percussion, and more pronounced Cuban and Congolese rumba sounds". In an interview with the American magazine Ebony, Stromae explained that Racine Carrée was intended to reconnect him with the musical influences of his youth. He said that the album's African influence was primarily Congolese rumba, which he considered particularly influential across African communities. He also told the Congolese media outlet 7sur7 that he wanted to blend his hip-hop and electro background with Congolese rumba, salsa, and trap, acknowledging that these styles might not initially seem compatible.

== Chart performance ==
In France, Racine carrée debuted at number one with one of the year's strongest first-week sales: 80,882 units, of which 55,597 were physical copies and 25,285 downloads. The opening week numbers were higher than the 75,000 copies his previous album, Cheese, had sold since its release. The following week, the album sold 50,901 copies but was replaced at the top of the chart by the second volume of tribute album Génération Goldman, which sold 59,274 units. By the end of September and after only six weeks of release, Racine carrée had crossed the 300,000 mark and spent five non-consecutive weeks at number one. In the last week of October, the album surpassed Daft Punk's Random Access Memories as the best selling album of 2013; up to that point the former had sold 475,500 copies while the latter had amassed 469,700 units. In its eighteenth week on the chart, just before Christmas, Racine carrée remained at number one for a sixteenth non-consecutive week at the top with its biggest weekly sales and the second-best weekly score of 2013, 182,034 units, just behind the 195,013 copies Random Access Memories sold in its first week of availability. This allowed it to cross the million mark in just four months; the last album to sell over one million copies was Adele's 21 (2011), which took eleven months.

In francophone Europe, Racine carrée also experienced massive success. In his native Belgium, Stromae's second album opened at number one in both Flanders and Wallonia. In the former, Racine carrée spent 17 non-consecutive weeks at number one; while in the latter, it remained at the top for 26 non-consecutive weeks. In late December, the album was certified seven times platinum by the Belgian Entertainment Association, denoting shipments of over 140,000 copies in the country. Additionally, Racine carrée finished the year as the best-selling album in both Flanders and Wallonia. In Switzerland, the album also debuted at number one and held the top spot for four additional weeks. In French-speaking Romandie, the album spent fourteen non-consecutive weeks at number one and remained in the top three for several weeks after its release in late August. In addition, Racine carrée has been certified 5× platinum by the Swiss branch of the International Federation of the Phonographic Industry, denoting shipments of 100,000 units. In Canada, the album debuted within the top ten and remained in the chart for only three weeks.

Success was not limited to francophone countries; the album also sold well in Germany and the Netherlands. In Germany, Racine carrée debuted just outside the top twenty in the main albums chart and at the top of the digital albums chart. In the Netherlands, the album debuted at number sixteen; the following week it climbed five positions to reach number eleven, its highest chart rank up to that point. After falling below the top forty and reaching positions as low as fifty-seven for two weeks, it eventually rebounded and entered the top ten for the first time in mid-December. The album later peaked within the top three. According to MegaCharts, the album finished the year as the fifty-eighth highest-selling album in the Netherlands. In Austria, the album did not reach the chart but sold constantly in the lower sales regions, eventually reaching gold.

== Singles ==
Racine carrée produced seven singles:

- "Papaoutai" was released as the lead single in mid-May 2013. The autobiographical song tells the story of a young boy who is looking for his father. Stromae revealed that his father was killed during the 1994 Rwandan genocide. The music video shows him adopting the style and pose of a 1940s mannequin, representing the absent father and the young version of him trying to interact with the mannequin. The single became an instant hit in France and Wallonia, where it spent multiple weeks at number one; it also reached the top ten in Switzerland and Luxembourg as well as non-francophone countries or regions such as the Czech Republic, Dutch-speaking Flanders in Belgium, Germany and the Netherlands.
- "Formidable" was released as the follow-up single to "Papaoutai" in June 2013. The music video, filmed in the streets of Brussels, was particularly notorious for displaying Stromae wandering at the Louise/Louiza tram and metro station during the daybreak, where the singer appears to be completely drunk. The song tells the story of a drunk man recently separated from his girlfriend. It eventually topped the charts in France and the Dutch-speaking and French-speaking regions of Belgium, reached the top five in the Netherlands, the top twenty in Switzerland and the top forty in Austria and Germany.
- "Tous les mêmes" was officially released as the third single from the album in December 2013. The song displays the various stereotypical traits and behaviours of men and women alike. The music video for the single shows Stromae half-dressed as a woman and acting annoyed by the attitude of men and what they do; to further aid the interpretation, green lighting effects are used for male Stromae and pink ones for female Stromae. The single became Stromae's third consecutive number one from Racine carrée in France and Wallonia, while reaching the top five in Flanders and charting in the Netherlands and Switzerland.
- "Ta fête" was released on 3 February 2014. The track served as the anthem for the Belgium national football team during the 2014 World Cup in Brazil.
- "Ave Cesaria" was released on 21 July 2014. The track honours Cesária Évora, one of Stromae's favourite artists who died in 2011.
- "Carmen" was released on 20 March 2015. The track was inspired by L'amour est un oiseau rebelle, an aria from the 1875 opera Carmen by Georges Bizet, hence the song's title.
- "Quand c'est ?" was released on 14 September 2015. A song about cancer and how it affected his father & mother.

== Track listing ==
No.	Title	Writer(s)	Producer(s)	Length
1.	"Ta fête"	Stromae	Stromae; Shameboy; Thomas Azier	2:55
2.	"Papaoutai"	Stromae	Stromae; Dizzy Mandjeku; Aron Ottignon	3:52
3.	"Bâtard"	Stromae	Stromae; Noumoucounda Cissoko; Azier	3:28
4.	"Ave Cesaria"	Stromae; Orelsan	Stromae; Mauricio Delgados; Antonio Santos; Schérazade	4:09
5.	"Tous les mêmes"	Stromae	Stromae; Bart Maris	3:30
6.	"Formidable"	Stromae	Stromae; Lionel Capouillez	3:33
7.	"Moules frites"	Stromae	Stromae; Guillaume Huguet	2:38
8.	"Carmen"	Stromae; Orelsan	Stromae ("Inspired by Georges Bizet's Carmen")	3:09
9.	"Humain à l'eau"	Stromae	Stromae	3:59
10.	"Quand c'est ?"	Stromae	Stromae - Luc Van Haver	3:00
11.	"Sommeil"	Stromae	Stromae; Tibass Kazematik	3:38
12.	"Merci"	Stromae	Stromae; Azier; Aron Ottingnon	3:48
13.	"AVF" (featuring Maître Gims and Orelsan)	Stromae; Maître Gims; Orelsan	Stromae; Atom	3:44
Total length:				45:31

iTunes bonus track
No.	Title	Writer(s)	Producer(s)	Length
14.	"Papaoutai (Remix)" (featuring Angel Haze)	Stromae; Angel Haze	Stromae; Papa Dizzy; Aron Ottignon	3:51
Total length:				49:22

== Charts ==
=== Weekly charts ===
2013 weekly chart performance for Racine carrée
Chart (2013)	Peak position
Belgian Albums (Ultratop Flanders)	1
Belgian Albums (Ultratop Wallonia)	1
Canadian Albums (Billboard)	10
French Albums (SNEP)	1
German Albums (Offizielle Top 100)	21
South Korea (Gaon Chart, International)	40
Swiss Albums (Schweizer Hitparade)	1
US World Albums (Billboard)	1

2014 weekly chart performance for Racine carrée
Chart (2014)	Peak position
Dutch Albums (Album Top 100)	1
Italian Albums (FIMI)	1
US Heatseekers Albums (Billboard)	19

2015 weekly chart performance for Racine carrée
Chart (2015)	Peak position
Danish Albums (Hitlisten)	25

=== Year-end charts ===
2013 year-end chart performance for Racine carrée
Chart (2013)	Position
Belgian Albums (Ultratop Flanders)	1
Belgian Albums (Ultratop Wallonia)	1
Dutch Albums (Album Top 100)	58
French Albums (SNEP)	1
Swiss Albums (Schweizer Hitparade)	5

2014 year-end chart performance for Racine carrée
Chart (2014)	Position
Belgian Albums (Ultratop Flanders)	1
Belgian Albums (Ultratop Wallonia)	1
Dutch Albums (Album Top 100)	3
French Albums (SNEP)	1
Italian Albums (FIMI)	22
Swiss Albums (Schweizer Hitparade)	2

2015 year-end chart performance for Racine carrée
Chart (2015)	Position
Dutch Albums (Album Top 100)	94
Swiss Albums (Schweizer Hitparade)	69

2019 year-end chart performance for Racine carrée
Chart (2019)	Position
Belgian Albums (Ultratop Flanders)	165
Belgian Albums (Ultratop Wallonia)	105

2020 year-end chart performance for Racine carrée
Chart (2020)	Position
Belgian Albums (Ultratop Flanders)	162
Belgian Albums (Ultratop Wallonia)	100

2021 year-end chart performance for Racine carrée
Chart (2021)	Position
Belgian Albums (Ultratop Flanders)	105
Belgian Albums (Ultratop Wallonia)	71

2022 year-end chart performance for Racine carrée
Chart (2022)	Position
Belgian Albums (Ultratop Flanders)	45
Belgian Albums (Ultratop Wallonia)	30
Dutch Albums (Album Top 100)	57

2023 year-end chart performance for Racine carrée
Chart (2023)	Position
Belgian Albums (Ultratop Flanders)	97
Belgian Albums (Ultratop Wallonia)	62

2024 year-end chart performance for Racine carrée
Chart (2024)	Position
Belgian Albums (Ultratop Flanders)	135
Belgian Albums (Ultratop Wallonia)	67

2025 year-end chart performance for Racine carrée
Chart (2025)	Position
Belgian Albums (Ultratop Flanders)	132
Belgian Albums (Ultratop Wallonia)	59

== Certifications ==
Sales certifications for Racine carrée
Region	Certification	Certified units/sales
Austria (IFPI Austria)	Gold	7,500^{*}
Belgium (BRMA)	12× Platinum	240,000^{*}
Canada (Music Canada)	2× Platinum	160,000^{‡}
Denmark (IFPI Danmark)	Platinum	20,000^{‡}
France (SNEP)	4× Diamond	2,500,000
Germany (BVMI)	Gold	100,000^{‡}
Italy (FIMI)	Platinum	50,000^{*}
Netherlands (NVPI)	Platinum	100,000
Poland (ZPAV)	Gold	10,000^{‡}
Russia (NFPF)	2× Platinum	20,000^{*}
Switzerland (IFPI Switzerland)	5× Platinum	100,000^{^}
United Kingdom	—	30,000
Summaries
Europe (IFPI)	2× Platinum	2,000,000^{*}
^{*} Sales figures based on certification alone.^{^} Shipments figures based on certification alone.^{‡} Sales+streaming figures based on certification alone.

== Release history ==
Country	Date	Format	Label
Australia	16 August 2013	Digital download	Mosaert
Austria	16 August 2013	Digital download	Mosaert
Belgium	16 August 2013	Digital download	Mosaert
Denmark	16 August 2013	Digital download	Mosaert
France	16 August 2013	Digital download	Mosaert
Italy	16 August 2013	Digital download	Mosaert
Latin America	16 August 2013	Digital download	Mosaert
Japan	16 August 2013	Digital download	Mosaert
New Zealand	16 August 2013	Digital download	Mosaert
Norway	16 August 2013	Digital download	Mosaert
Singapore	16 August 2013	Digital download	Mosaert
Spain	16 August 2013	Digital download	Mosaert
Sweden	16 August 2013	Digital download	Mosaert
Switzerland	16 August 2013	Digital download	Mosaert
United Kingdom	16 August 2013	Digital download	Mosaert
Canada	19 August 2013	Digital download	Mosaert
Mexico	19 August 2013	Digital download	Mosaert
United States	19 August 2013	Digital download	Mosaert
