= Stromae =

Belgian musician and producer (born 1985)

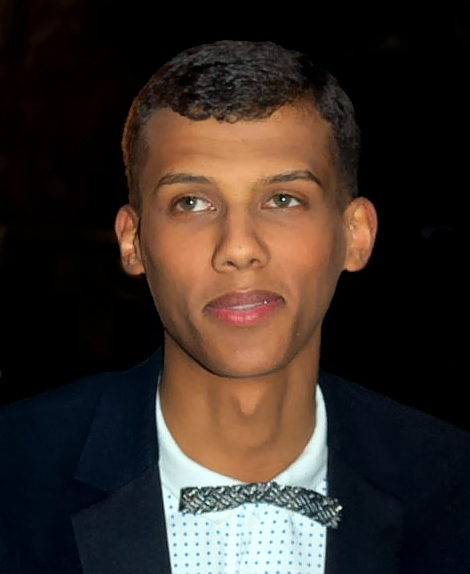
- Stromae at the 2011 NRJ Music Awards

Background information
- Born: Paul Van Haver; 12 March 1985 (age 41); Etterbeek, Brussels, Belgium
- Genres: Hip hop; house; electronic; electropop; synth-pop; new beat; eurodance
- Occupations: Singer; rapper; songwriter; record producer
- Instruments: Vocals; keyboards
- Works: Discography; songs recorded
- Years active: 2000–present
- Labels: Mosaert; B1; Vertigo; Mercury; Universal; Republic; Casablanca; Island; Columbia; Polydor; Interscope
- Spouse: Coralie Barbier (m. 2015)
- Website: stromae.com

Paul Van Haver (Flemish: [ˈpʌul vɑn ˈɦaːvər]; born 12 March 1985), better known by his stage name Stromae (French: [stʁɔmaj]), is a Belgian singer, rapper, songwriter and record producer. He is best known for his blend of hip-hop and electronic music styles. Stromae gained mainstream attention in 2009 with his song "Alors on danse" (from the album Cheese), which became a number one in several European countries. In 2013, his second album Racine carrée was a commercial success, selling two million copies in France and yielding chart-topping singles "Papaoutai" and "Formidable".

== Early life ==
Paul Van Haver was born in the Brussels municipality of Etterbeek to a Tutsi father from Rwanda, Pierre Rutare, and a Flemish mother, Miranda Van Haver; he said in an interview that he also has distant Somali heritage from his father's side. He and his siblings were raised in the city's Laken district by their mother, as their father, an architect, was killed during the 1994 Rwandan genocide while visiting his family.

On his absent father, he declared in 2019, "My father was never there for me. He left right away. He was a runner, a flirt. I learned much later that I had half-siblings. He was an architect who went back and forth between Belgium and Rwanda. I must have seen him twenty times in my life, and he died during the Rwandan genocide. But he had already disappeared for me, and when I learned of his death, I didn't cry. Perhaps I hadn't prepared myself. The fact remains that we won't be able to make up for lost time with this dad we didn't see when we were little."

He attended the Sacred Heart School Center in Jette, a Jesuit school in Jette, and the Collège Saint-Paul in Godinne, after failing in the public school system at the age of 16. He formed a small rap group with his friends while still in school. His early influences included Belgian singer-songwriter Jacques Brel, son cubano and Congolese rumba.

== Career ==
=== 2000–2008: Early career ===
In 2000, Stromae began his music career as a rapper called Opsmaestro. He later changed his stage name to "Stromae", which is an anagram for "Maestro". This inversion is a type of French slang known as verlan.

At 18, he began a rap group called "Suspicion", with the rapper "J.E.D.I.". After the pair split, Stromae began his solo career. He released his first EP, "Juste un cerveau, un flow, un fond et un mic...", while studying at INRACI, the Brussels film school.

=== 2008–2013: Breakthrough and international success ===
In 2008, Stromae signed a four-year record deal with Because Music. In 2009, he released "Alors on danse", which was immediately successful in Europe. His debut album, Cheese, was released on 14 June 2010.

On 2 September 2010, Stromae collaborated with Kanye West and Gilbere Forte in a remix of his hit "Alors on danse". On 9 February 2011, Cheese won the award for Best Dance Album at the Victoires de la Musique.

On 23 May 2011, during the recording of the French TV show Taratata, Stromae did a mashup of "Alors on danse" and "Don't Stop the Party" with the Black Eyed Peas. Stromae also announced he would perform as the opening support act for the first of two concerts by the band in Paris on 24 and 25 June 2011 at Stade de France.

In 2011, he received one nomination for Best Belgian Act at the MTV Europe Music Awards.

=== 2013–2017: Racine carrée ===
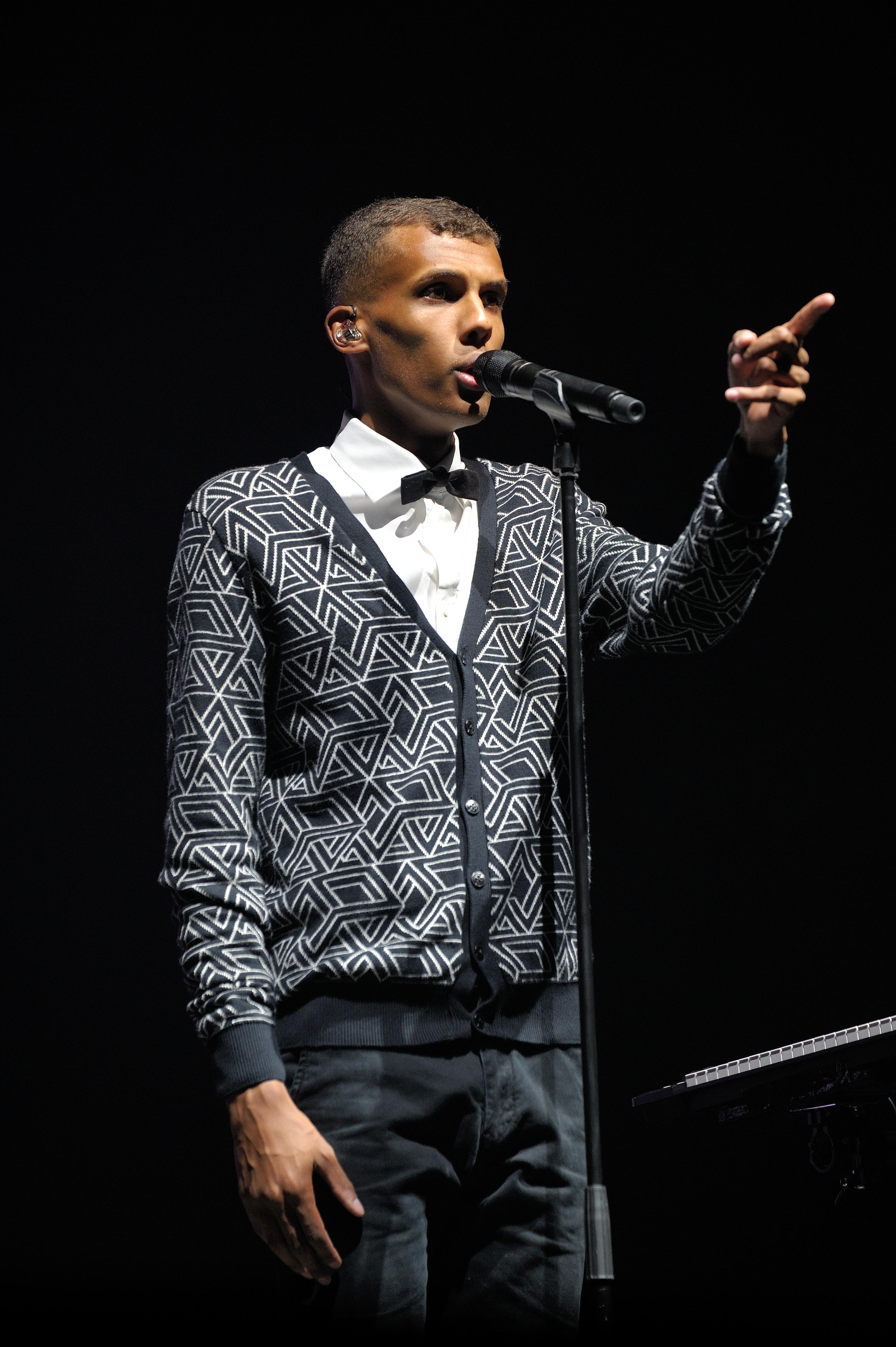
Stromae performing in 2014

The first single "Papaoutai" from his second album Racine carrée (meaning "square root") was digitally released on 13 May 2013. It went on to chart at number one in Belgium and France, number 2 in the Netherlands, as well as number 7 in Germany and number 4 in Switzerland.

On 22 May 2013, amateur-looking videos appeared on YouTube showing Stromae, apparently drunk and wandering at the Louise tram station in Brussels at dawn. The videos went viral. A few days later, it was revealed that this was linked with the filming of a professional music video. This was confirmed during an appearance by Stromae on the French TV show Ce soir ou jamais in which he discussed and also performed his new single "Formidable", which is about the story of a drunk man just separated from his girlfriend. The music video was made from edited hidden-camera footage taken on 22 May. It also shows people taking pictures with their cellphones, people who are clearly irritated by his drunk actions, people helping him stand up, and three policemen asking if the artist was okay or if he needed some help. The policemen were criticised for not disciplining the drunk Stromae; however, they later said the full story had not been shown. The part where they returned and Stromae had to explain his case was not broadcast.

On 26 July 2013, Stromae announced on his Facebook and Twitter accounts that he had completed his second studio album Racine carrée, and that it would be released on 16 August 2013. On 25 August 2013, Stromae joined Major Lazer's show at French festival Rock en Seine, where he performed "Papaoutai". In September 2013, Belgian rock band Mintzkov covered his song "Formidable" for a live session on Studio Brussel, with lyrics in English. In the same month, September 23, 2013, he released “Tous les mêmes”. In November 2013, Stromae received the award for Best Belgian Act at the MTV Europe Music Awards.

On 22 February 2014, he performed his song "Formidable" as a guest at the Sanremo Music Festival in Italy.

On 17 March 2014, it was announced that Stromae's song "Ta fête" would become the official song for the Belgium national team at the 2014 FIFA World Cup.

In June 2014, in support of Racine carrée, Stromae made his US television debut on NBC's Late Night with Seth Meyers. He then embarked on a tour across the United States and performed at the Best Buy Theater in New York City. While in New York, on 22 June 2014, Stromae guest-starred in a Snapchat story with Jérôme Jarre as The Carrot's Father.

"Meltdown"
A 19-second sound sample from "Meltdown", an electro and dance-pop number with hip hop influences using drums and piano in its production.

On 21 October 2014, it was revealed that New Zealand singer Lorde invited Stromae to work on the soundtrack for The Hunger Games: Mockingjay – Part 1 with artists including Kanye West, Grace Jones, Diplo and The Chemical Brothers. He contributed to the song "Meltdown", which also features Pusha T, Q-Tip, Haim and Lorde herself. The singer had declared herself a fan of Stromae after attending his concert earlier that month. In March 2015, Stromae released a music video for the song "Carmen", which was directed by Sylvain Chomet. The video warns people against the addictive qualities of social media apps such as Twitter.

Stromae continued touring the United States, performing in March 2015 at several festivals including SXSW and Coachella. He then began a tour in Africa on 13 May. However, in mid-June he was forced to cancel the remaining of his shows until 2 August for health reasons. This was later revealed in 2017 that the cause of Stromae's health issues were an anti-malaria drug called mefloquine, he had used ahead of and during his tour in Africa in 2015. The drug made him suffer insomnia and hallucinations. He stated that had his brother not been around, then he would've likely committed suicide. He performed at Madison Square Garden in October, becoming the first exclusively French-singing performer to sell out that venue. He achieved this not only once, but twice.

On 14 September 2015, Stromae released a single "Quand c'est ?", a song about cancer, which plays on the fact that "Quand c'est ?" (When is it?) and "cancer" are phonetically similar in French.

=== 2018–present: New work and Multitude ===
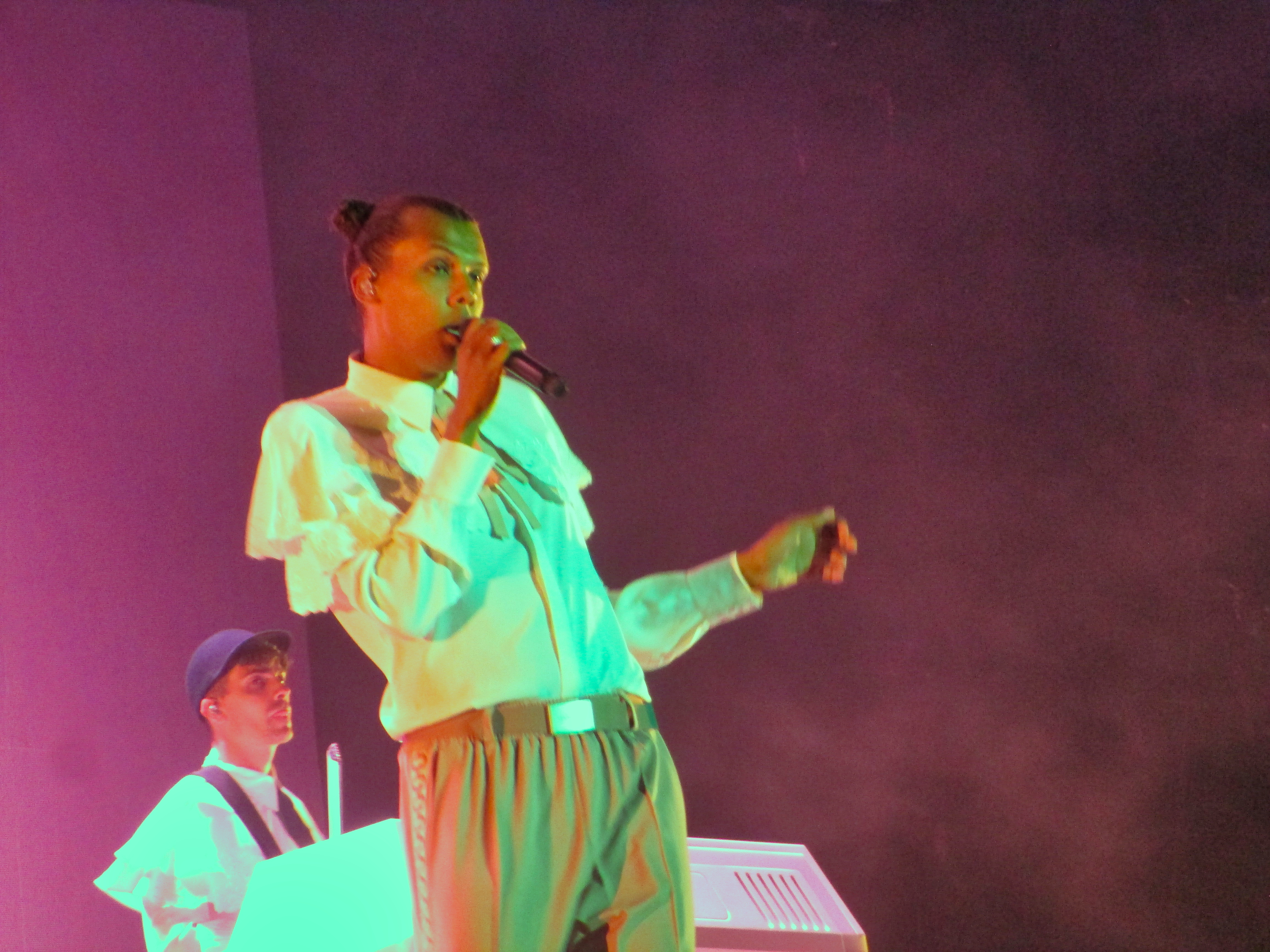
Stromae, headlining the 2022 Rock en Seine festival

On 6 April 2018, Stromae released his first single in more than three years, "Défiler", to accompany the release of "Capsule 5" a new fashion line. The song was co-composed with his brother, Luc Junior Tam. The song's lyrics play on the meanings in the French language of the words "défiler" ("to parade/pass by", often used to refer to models walking down a runway), "fil" (thread, line) and "filer" (to whizz by), evoking themes of modelling and superficiality; of life speeding by; and of toeing the line or hanging by a thread.

In 2019, he co-produced and provided vocals in French for the song "Arabesque" by the band Coldplay for their album Everyday Life.

On 10 November 2020, during his first Live Instagram on the occasion of the tenth anniversary of his clothing brand Mosaert, he mentioned working on new music. Finally, on 15 October 2021 his first single in three years, named "Santé", was released. When asked during a 2022 interview whether "Santé" is about workers during the COVID-19 pandemic he said, "No, not exactly." Stromae explained that he wrote the song about Rosa, the woman who cleans his house, and that the song is about celebrating people who "are just working while we are partying". It is also now identified by a dance Stromae made up specifically for the song, which can be seen in the music video. On 8 December 2021, he announced that his third studio album, Multitude, would be released on 4 March 2022.

On 9 January 2022, he unveiled a second single from the album, "L'enfer", by performing it live during the 8 pm TV news on TF1.

In April 2023, he cancelled a number of tour dates across Europe due to ill health. The next month, he cancelled the remainder of his tour due to health concerns.

In 2024, Stromae contributed to the soundtrack of Arcane's second season in the track "Ma meilleure ennemie" alongside French singer Pomme.

== Collaborations ==
In 2009, Stromae collaborated with Kery James on the song "Ghetto", also featuring J-mi Sissoko. The song was the subject of his "Lesson Number 14" series on YouTube.

Also in 2009, Stromae collaborated with DJ Psar on a French-language mix of "We Will Rock You" by Queen, entitled "We Will Strock You".

In 2010, Stromae's song "Alors on danse" was remixed by Kanye West. Stromae brought West on stage at Coachella in 2015 while he performed the song.

Stromae collaborated with Lorde, Haim, Pusha T, and Q-Tip for the song "Meltdown", which uses the instrumental of his song "Merci", a track originally recorded for his 2014 album Racine carrée. The track was featured on the soundtrack for the film The Hunger Games: Mockingjay – Part 1.

Stromae collaborated with director Henry Scholfield to produce the music video for English artist Dua Lipa's single "IDGAF". The video was released on 12 January 2018.

Stromae provided vocals for Coldplay's 2019 single "Arabesque" on their eighth studio album, Everyday Life.

Stromae also collaborated with French rapper Orelsan on a song called "La pluie".

Stromae collaborated with Camila Cabello in the music video for "Mon amour", where she contributed vocals in English and French for the video version in 2022.

Stromae collaborated with Pomme for the song "Ma meilleure ennemie" appearing in the seventh episode of the second season of the animated series Arcane, released on the 23 November 2024.

Stromae collaborated with Madonna on the track "My Sins Are My Savior". The electro-dance song was released as part of Madonna's album, Confessions II, on 3 July 2026.

== Other ventures ==
Stromae launched a fashion line, Mosaert (an anagram of his stage name), described as "hipster" and "retro kitsch". Stromae has said that he wanted to "create a bridge between British style and African aesthetic". The first collection was a success, with stocks almost sold out after three days. The second collection, Capsule No. 2, was released at Colette in Paris on 3 December 2014, and features the square root design on each item in different colors. Capsule No. 3 was released on 7 April 2016, a music track was released on 31 March 2017 to promote the line. The new designs are the first to use patterns not previously worn by Stromae, reflecting Mosaert's intention to gradually move into a separate stylistic identity for the clothing line.

On 6 April 2018, Mosaert presented a fashion show at Le Bon Marché Rive Gauche in Paris to mark the release of its latest collection, "Capsule n°5", which was accompanied by the release of Stromae's first new single in more than five years, "Défiler".

In the early 2020s, Stromae designed an artwork for the Saint-Denis–Pleyel metro station in Paris, France, however he withdrew from the project for health reasons.

In 2020, Mosaert collaborated with Repetto, the French ballet shoe company. As a result of this, an exclusively-instrumental song was made by Stromae, entitled "Repetto x Mosaert".

== Personal life ==
In 2015, Stromae had to cancel a tour through Africa because of anxiety caused by the malaria medicine Lariam (Mefloquine). He remained largely out of the public eye until 2022, when he released Multitude and participated in interviews and media appearances to support the album. Since then he has avoided public appearances. In a 2017 interview, he stated that he still suffers from panic attacks and initially left open whether he would ever be able to make music professionally again.

On 12 December 2015, Van Haver was secretly married to Coralie Barbier by the Catholic priest Guy Gilbert, in a private ceremony held in Mechelen. The couple's first child was born in 2018.

Despite having a Dutch name and a Flemish-speaking mother, Stromae is a Francophone due to being raised in a French-speaking community. He stated in an interview that he could speak some Flemish, but much preferred French, his mother tongue. He is also fluent in English.

== Musical style ==
Stromae's music is heavily influenced by electronic music, especially Belgian New Beat music. He has been touted as the "face of the New Beat generation".

Stromae has been compared to Jacques Brel, whom Stromae considers a big influence, with Stromae covering several of his songs.

== Discography ==
Studio albums

- Cheese (2010)
- Racine carrée (2013)
- Multitude (2022)
