= Stromae discography =

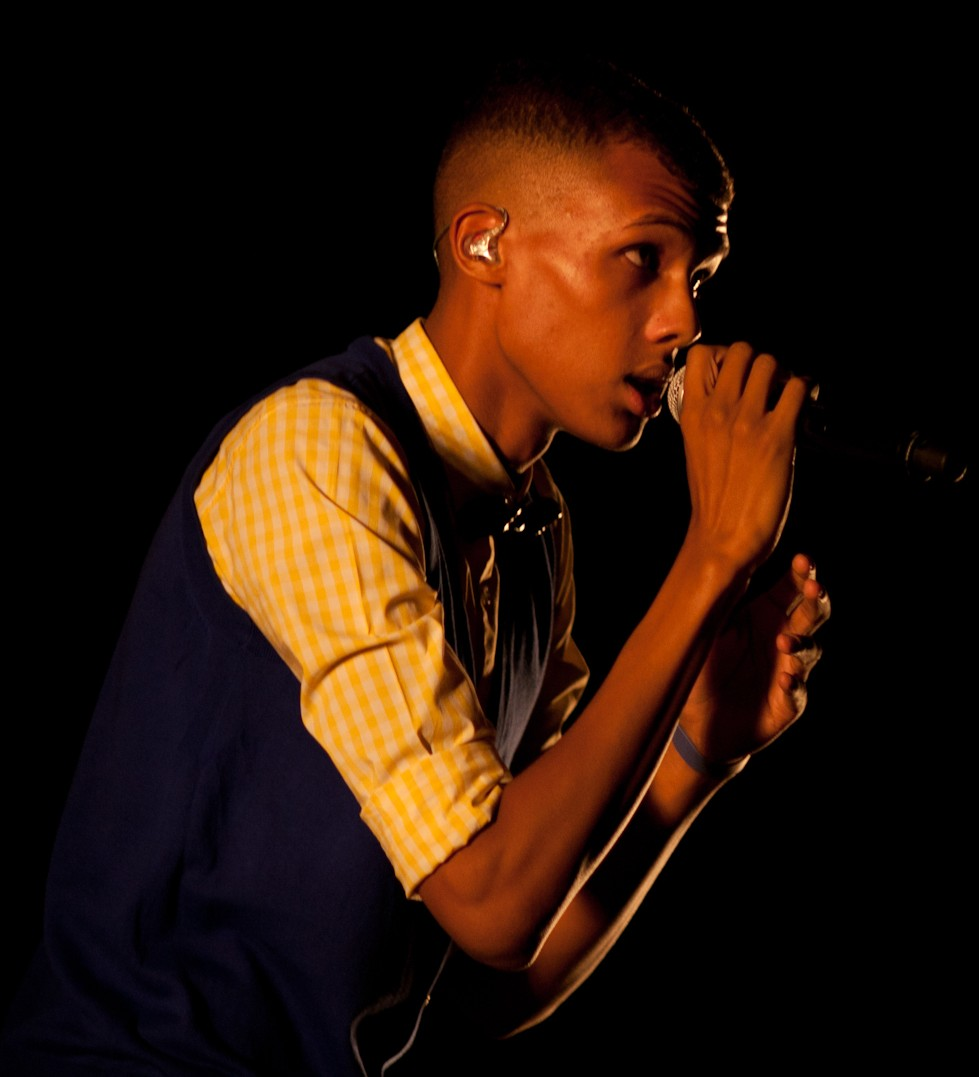
- Stromae at the Brussels Summer Festival in 2011
- Studio albums: 3
- Extended plays: 1
- Compilation albums: 2
- Singles: 24
- Video albums: 1
- Music videos: 24

The discography of Belgian singer-songwriter Stromae consists of three studio albums, one extended play, 21 singles and five promotional singles.

His first extended play, Juste un cerveau, un flow, un fond et un mic..., was released in 2007. His second single, "Up Saw Liz", was released in 2009. His second mixtape, Mixture Elecstro was released in 2010. "Alors on danse" was released on 26 September 2009 as the lead single from his debut studio album. The song became a huge international success reaching number one in 14 countries including Austria, Belgium, Denmark, France, Italy, the Netherlands and Switzerland.

His debut studio album, Cheese, was released on 14 June 2010. "Te Quiero" was released as the second single from the album, peaking at number 4 in Belgium. "House'llelujah" was released as the third single from the album peaking to number 22 in Belgium.

In 2013, his second album Racine carrée was released. The three singles from the album reached the number 1 position both in France and Belgium, even occupying the two first places in his home country. Stromae released his third album, Multitude in 2022.

== Albums ==
=== Studio albums ===
Title	Album details	Peak chart positions										Certifications	Sales
Title	Album details	BEL (WA)	BEL (FL)	AUT	CAN	DEN	FRA	GER	ITA	NLD	SWI	Certifications	Sales
Cheese	Released: 11 June 2010; Label: Mosaert; Format: CD, LP, digital download, streaming	1	7	33	70	—	6	29	—	69	18	BRMA: 3× Platinum; IFPI DEN: Gold; MC: Gold; SNEP: 3× Platinum	FRA: 260,000
Racine carrée	Released: 16 August 2013; Label: Universal Music Group, B1 Recordings, Mosaert; Format: CD, 2×LP, digital download, streaming	1	1	—	10	25	1	21	1	1	1	BRMA: 12× Platinum; BVMI: Gold; FIMI: Platinum; IFPI AUT: Gold; IFPI DEN: Platinum; IFPI SWI: 5× Platinum; MC: 2× Platinum; NVPI: Platinum; SNEP: 4× Diamond	FRA: 2,500,000; NLD: 100,000; UK: 30,000
Multitude	Released: 4 March 2022; Label: Universal Music Group, B1 Recordings, Mosaert; Format: CD, LP, digital download, streaming	1	1	2	4	8	1	4	10	1	1	BRMA: 3× Platinum; SNEP: 3× Platinum	FRA: 300,000; WW: 870,000
"—" denotes album that did not chart or was not released.

=== Mixtapes ===
Title	Album details
Freestyle Finest (& Gandhi, K-Deeja)	Released: 2006
Mixture Elecstro (& DJ Psar)	Released: 31 October 2009; Label: Because Music, Kilomaître; Format: CD, digital download

=== Video albums ===
Title	Album details	Peak chart positions							Certifications
Title	Album details	BEL (WA)	BEL (FL)	FRA	ITA	NLD	SWE	SWI	Certifications
Racine carrée Live	Released: 11 December 2015; Label: Sony Music; Format: DVD, Blu-ray	1	1	1	13	1	3	1	SNEP: Diamond

=== Compilation albums ===
Title	Album details	Peak chart positions			
Title	Album details	BEL (WA)	BEL (FL)	FRA	SWI
Cheese + Racine carrée	Released: 18 August 2017; Label: Mercury Records; Format: 2×CD	112	199	35	— (Note: Cheese + Racine carrée did not enter the Albums Top 100, but peaked at number 47 on the Romandy Top 50 Singles chart.)
Racine carrée + Multitude	Released: 13 September 2024; Label: Mosaert, Universal Music France; Format: 2×CD	—	—	—	—
"—" denotes album that did not chart or was not released.

== Extended plays ==
Title	EP details
Juste un cerveau, un flow, un fond et un mic...	Released: 2007; Released by: Institut national de radioélectricité et cinématographie; Format: CD, digital download

== Singles ==
=== As lead artist ===
Title	Year	Peak chart positions										Certifications	Album
Title	Year	BEL (WA)	BEL (FL)	AUT	DEN	FRA	GER	ITA	NLD	SWI	UK	Certifications	Album
"Faut qu't'arrêtes le rap..." (featuring J.E.D.I.)	2005	—	—	—	—	—	—	—	—	—	—		Non-album singles
"Enfants de l'an 2000" (featuring Shadow Loowee and Ekila)	2009	—	—	—	—	—	—	—	—	—	—		Non-album singles
"Up Saw Liz"	2009	—	—	—	—	—	—	—	—	—	—		Mixture Elecstro
"Alors on danse"	2009	1	1	1	1	1	1	1	1	1	25	BRMA: 3× Platinum; BPI: Platinum; BVMI: 7× Gold; FIMI: 2× Platinum; IFPI AUT: 3× Platinum; IFPI DEN: 3× Platinum; IFPI SWI: 2× Platinum; NVPI: Platinum; SNEP: Diamond	Cheese
"Bienvenue chez moi"	2010	— (Note: "Bienvenue chez moi" did not enter the Ultratop 50, but peaked at number 42 on the Wallonish Back Catalogue Singles chart.)	—	—	—	—	—	—	—	—	—		Cheese
"Te Quiero"	2010	4	17	—	—	153	—	—	70	62	—	BRMA: Gold; SNEP: Gold	Cheese
"House'llelujah"	2010	22	— (Note: "House'llelujah" did not enter the Ultratop 50, but peaked at number 30 on the Flemish Ultratip chart.)	—	—	—	—	—	—	—	—		Cheese
"Rail de musique"	2010	—	—	—	—	—	—	—	—	—	—		Cheese
"Peace or Violence"	2010	12	— (Note: "Peace or violence" did not enter the Ultratop 50, but peaked at number 12 on the Flemish Ultratip chart.)	74	—	—	—	—	—	—	—		Cheese
"Papaoutai"	2013	1	3	3	—	1	6	10	2	4	—	BRMA: 3× Platinum; BPI: Silver; BVMI: 3× Gold; FIMI: 2× Platinum; IFPI AUT: 2× Platinum; IFPI DEN: Platinum; IFPI SWI: 2× Platinum; NVPI: Platinum; SNEP: Diamond	Racine carrée
"Formidable"	2013	1	1	36	20	1	39	16	2	13	—	BRMA: 3× Platinum; BVMI: Gold; FIMI: Platinum; IFPI AUT: Gold; IFPI DEN: Platinum; IFPI SWI: Platinum; SNEP: Diamond	Racine carrée
"Tous les mêmes"	2014	1	4	—	10	1	—	5	29	27	—	BRMA: Platinum; FIMI: 2× Platinum; IFPI AUT: Gold; SNEP: Diamond	Racine carrée
"Ta fête"	2014	2	6	—	—	30	—	—	45	—	—	BRMA: Platinum; SNEP: Platinum	Racine carrée
"Ave Cesaria"	2014	45	— (Note: "Ave Cesaria" did not enter the Ultratop 50, but peaked at number 3 on the Flemish Ultratip chart.)	—	—	97	—	—	—	—	—	SNEP: Platinum	Racine carrée
"Meltdown" (featuring Lorde, Pusha T, Q-Tip and Haim)	2014	5	7	—	—	107	—	—	—	—	—		The Hunger Games: Mockingjay – Part 1
"Carmen"	2015	46	31	—	—	67	—	—	— (Note: "Carmen" did not enter the Single Top 100, but peaked at number 30 on the Single Tip chart.)	—	—	SNEP: Platinum	Racine carrée
"Quand c'est ?"	2015	— (Note: "Quand c'est?" did not enter the Ultratop 50, but peaked at number 5 on the Wallonish Ultratip chart.)	39	—	—	142	—	—	— (Note: "Quand c'est?" did not enter the Single Top 100, but peaked at number 15 on the Single Tip chart.)	—	—		Racine carrée
"Repetto X Mosaert"	2017	—	—	—	—	—	—	—	—	—	—		Non-album singles
"Défiler"	2018	7	29	—	—	8	—	—	—	— (Note: "Défiler" did not enter the Singles Top 100, but peaked at number 9 on the Romandy Top 20 Singles chart.)	—		Non-album singles
"Santé"	2021	1	2	—	—	3	—	—	22	7	—	BRMA: 2× Platinum; SNEP: Diamond	Multitude
"L'enfer"	2022	1	1	—	—	1	— (Note: "L'enfer" did not enter the Single Top 100, but peaked at number 11 on the Single Trending Charts.)	—	6	2	—	BRMA: 3× Platinum; SNEP: Diamond	Multitude
"Fils de joie"	2022	3	28	—	—	6	—	—	30	8	—	BRMA: Platinum; SNEP: Gold	Multitude
"Mon amour" (with Camila Cabello)	2022	6	18	—	—	24	—	—	— (Note: "Mon amour" did not enter the Single Top 100, but peaked at number six on the Single Tip chart.)	90	—	BRMA: Gold; SNEP: Gold	Multitude
"Ma meilleure ennemie" (with Pomme)	2024	1	8	28	—	1	28	54	21	4	19	BRMA: Platinum; BPI: Silver; SNEP: Diamond	Arcane League of Legends: Season 2
"Que ce soit clair" (with Paul Kalkbrenner)	2025	3	23	—	—	40	—	—	—	44	—	BRMA: Gold; SNEP: Platinum	The Essence
"Des fleurs" (with Tove Lo)	2026	1	47	—	—	48	—	—	—	—	—	BRMA: Gold; SNEP: Gold	Estrus
"—" denotes single that did not chart or was not released.

=== As featured artist ===
Title	Year	Peak chart positions						Certifications	Album
Title	Year	BEL (WA)	BEL (FL)	FRA	SWI	UK	US	Certifications	Album
"Comme dab" (Vitaa feat. Stromae)	2017	— (Note: "Comme dab" did not enter the Ultratop 50, but peaked at number 9 on the Wallonish Ultratip chart.)	—	66	—	—	—	SNEP: Gold	Vitaa album J4M
"La pluie" (Orelsan feat. Stromae)	2018	2	— (Note: "La pluie" did not enter the Ultratop 50, but peaked at number 14 on the Flemish Ultratip chart.)	10	— (Note: "La pluie" did not enter the Singles Top 100, but peaked at number 15 on the Romandy Top 20 Singles chart.)	—	—	SNEP: Diamond	Orelsan album La fête est finie
"Arabesque" (Coldplay feat. Stromae)	2019	— (Note: "Arabesque" did not enter the Ultratop 50, but peaked at number 8 on the Wallonish Ultratip chart.)	— (Note: "Arabesque" did not enter the Ultratop 50, but peaked at number 20 on the Flemish Ultratip chart.)	—	25	— (Note: "Arabesque" did not enter the UK singles chart, but peaked at number 75 on the UK Singles Downloads Chart.)	— (Note: "Arabesque" did not enter the Billboard Hot 100, but peaked at number 29 on the Hot Rock & Alternative Songs chart.)		Coldplay album Everyday Life
"Pardon" (Burna Boy feat. Stromae)	2025	—	—	—	—	—	— (Note: "Pardon" did not enter the Billboard Hot 100, but peaked at number 16 on the Billboard U.S. Afrobeats Songs chart.)		Burna Boy album No Sign of Weakness
"—" denotes single that did not chart or was not released.

=== Promotional singles ===
Title	Year	Peak chart positions			Album
Title	Year	BEL (WA)	BEL (FL)	FRA	Album
"Je cours"	2010	16	15	—	Cheese
"Humain à l'eau"	2013	47	—	110	Racine carrée
"—" denotes single that did not chart or was not released.

== Other songs ==
=== As featured artist ===
Title	Year	Album
"Putain putain" (Arno feat. Stromae)	2014	Arno album Le coffret essentiel
"Pardon" (Burna Boy, Stromae)	2025	Burna Boy album No Sign of Weakness
"My Sins Are My Savior" (Madonna feat. Stromae)	2026	Madonna album Confessions II

=== Other charted and certified songs ===
Title	Year	Peak chart positions		Certifications	Album
Title	Year	BEL (WA)	FRA	Certifications	Album
"Silence"	2010	26	—		Cheese
"Bâtard"	2013	37	52	SNEP: Gold	Racine carrée
"Moules frites"	2013	—	189		Racine carrée
"Carmen"	2013	—	109		Racine carrée
"Sommeil"	2013	—	142		Racine carrée
"Merci"	2013	—	143		Racine carrée
"AVF" (featuring Maître Gims and Orelsan)	2013	38	43	SNEP: Gold	Racine carrée
"Invaincu"	2022	—	7	BRMA: Gold	Multitude
"La solassitude"	2022	39	8	BRMA: Gold; SNEP: Gold	Multitude
"C'est que du bonheur"	2022	—	16		Multitude
"Pas vraiment"	2022	—	17		Multitude
"Riez"	2022	—	18		Multitude
"Déclaration"	2022	—	25		Multitude
"Mauvais journée"	2022	—	26		Multitude
"Bonne journée"	2022	—	22	BRMA: Gold	Multitude
"—" denotes song that did not chart or was not released.

== Songwriting and production credits ==
Title	Year	Artist(s)	Album	Credits	Written with	Produced with
"La Place du Roi"	2005	Seriak	Non-album single	Producer	—	—
"Ghetto" (featuring J-Mi Sissoko)	2008	Kery James	À l'ombre du show business	Co-writer	Kery James, Jean-Michel Sissoko	—
"Hello Shadow" (featuring Kiesza)	2017	Skygge	Hello World	Co-writer/Producer	Benoit Carre, Rachid Mir, Christian Dessart	Skygge, Ash Workman

== Music videos ==
=== As lead artist ===
Title	Year	Director(s)	Ref.
"Faut qu't'arrêtes le rap..." (featuring J.E.D.I.)	2005		
"Minimalistyle"	2007		
"Promo-son"	2007		
"Freestyle Finest" (& Gandhi, K–Deeja)	2008		
"C'est Stromae"	2008		
"Si tu veux me faire du buzz..."	2008		
"...buzz des mains"	2008		
"Up Saw Liz"	2009		
"Alors on danse"	2010	Stromae, Jérôme Guiot	
"Te Quiero"	2010		
"House'llelujah"	2010		
"Je cours"	2011	Jérôme Guiot	
"Peace or Violence" (Note: Also censored version of "Peace or Violence" music video was released (uncredited).)	2011	Joris Rabijns, Raf Reyntjens	
"Formidable"	2013	Jérôme Guiot	
"Papaoutai"	2013	Raf Reyntjens	
"Tous les mêmes"	2013	Henry Scholfield	
"Ta fête"	2014	Lieven van Baelen	
"Carmen"	2015	Sylvain Chomet	
"Quand c'est ?"	2015	Xavier Reyé	
"Défiler"	2018	Luc Junior Tam, Sacha Wiernik	
