= Racine carrée Live =

Live album by Stromae
- Released: 11 December 2015
- Recorded: Centre Bell (28–29 September 2015)
- Length: 1:57:21
- Language: French
- Label: Columbia Records, Epic Records, Mosaert
- Producer: Stromae

Racine carrée Live (stylised as √ Live) is a live video release by Belgian musician Stromae. It was released on 11 December 2015.

== Track listing ==
No.	Title
1.	"Intro"
2.	"Ta fête"
3.	"Bâtard"
4.	"Peace or Violence"
5.	"Te quiero"
6.	"Tous les mêmes"
7.	"Ave Cesaria"
8.	"Sommeil"
9.	"Quand c'est?"
10.	"Je cours"
11.	"Moules frites"
12.	"Formidable"
13.	"Silence"
14.	"Carmen"
15.	"Humain à l'eau"
16.	"Alors on danse"
17.	"Push the Feeling"
18.	"Gypsy Woman"
19.	"Rhythm Is a Dancer"
20.	"Insomnia"
21.	"Papaoutai"
22.	"Merci"
23.	"Tous les mêmes" (A capella)

== Charts ==
Chart (2015/2016)	Peak position
Belgium (Ultratop 10 DVD Musicaux — Wallonia)	1
Belgium (Ultratop 10 Muziek–DVD — Flanders)	1
France (Top DVD Musicaux)	1
Italy (DVD Musicali)	3
Netherlands (DVD Music Top 30)	1
Sweden (Veckolista DVD album)	3
Switzerland (Musik-DVD Top 10)	1

== Certifications ==
Region	Certification	Certified units/sales
France (SNEP)	Diamond	60,000^{*}
^{*} Sales figures based on certification alone.
