= Familia (Camila Cabello album) =

- Standard cover

Studio album by Camila Cabello
- Released: April 8, 2022
- Recorded: June 2020 – February 2022
- Studios: Gold Diggers Sound (Los Angeles); Camila's house (Los Angeles); EastWest Studios (Los Angeles); Elysian Park (Los Angeles); Larrabee Sound Studios (Hollywood); Dimension 70 (New York); Bill's House (Los Angeles)
- Genre: Latin pop
- Length: 34:19
- Languages: English; Spanish
- Label: Epic
- Producers: Ricky Reed; Mike Sabath; Scott Harris; Cheche Alara; Edgar Barrera; Jose Castillo; Tom Peyton

Camila Cabello chronology
Romance (2019)	Familia (2022)	C,XOXO (2024)

Singles from Familia
- 1. "Don't Go Yet" Released: July 23, 2021; 2. "Bam Bam" Released: March 4, 2022; 3. "Psychofreak" Released: April 8, 2022; 4. "Hasta los Dientes" Released: May 13, 2022

Familia (lit. 'family') is the third studio album by American singer Camila Cabello. It was released on April 8, 2022, through Epic Records. Cabello wrote the album during the COVID-19 pandemic between 2020 and 2021 with producers such as Mike Sabath, Ricky Reed, Edgar Barrera, and Cheche Alara. The album was inspired by the "manifest collective joy" Cabello felt with her family during the pandemic and is about connecting with the singer's Mexican and Cuban roots. Familia features guest vocals from Ed Sheeran, Willow, María Becerra and Yotuel. It was Cabello's last album with Epic Records as she departed months after the album's release and signed with Interscope Records. Primarily a Latin pop record, Familia also incorporates electropop, trip-hop and disco influences.

Two singles preceded the album: the lead single "Don't Go Yet", which entered the charts in various countries, reaching number 42 on the Billboard Hot 100, and 28 on the Billboard Global 200. It was followed by "Bam Bam", which peaked at number 21 in the United States, and reached the top ten on the Billboard Global 200, in Canada, and the United Kingdom. To promote the album, Cabello headlined a virtual TikTok concert, titled Familia: Welcome to the Family on April 7, 2022. The album reached the top ten in Canada, Spain, the UK, and the US.

== Background ==
In December 2019, Cabello released her second studio album, Romance, which mainly focuses on the theme of falling in love. It debuted at number three on the Billboard 200 and number one in Canada. She released collaborative songs with other artists in the same year, such as Shawn Mendes' "Señorita" and "My Oh My" featuring DaBaby. On July 14, 2021, Cabello first teased new music, using her Instagram account by sharing a close-up of her face along with the caption, "listos?" which translates from Spanish to English as "Ready?". On July 16, 2021, Camila announced via her social media accounts that the lead single from the album, "Don't Go Yet" would be released on July 23. On the same day, she confirmed the album title.

There's definitely some surprises on the album, perspectives people haven't heard me come from before, things I haven't talked about before. And sonically, a whole new kind of landscape for me that draws on a lot of my roots, I'm Cuban-Mexican. Drawing from my childhood.

— Cabello on the album's content and inspiration, Released

During a YouTube series Released the singer revealed that a track, titled "Celia", features vocals from her cousin, Caro. During an exclusive interview with Enrique Santos, Camila teased a track called "Lola" that features Cuban singer Yotuel. During a July 2021 interview with Los 40, the singer revealed there are songs on this record "that are only in Spanish and that have a completely different sound" than her previous work. On February 21, 2022, Cabello announced the record's second single, "Bam Bam" featuring Ed Sheeran, to be released on March 4. On March 3, she confirmed that Familia would be released on April 8, 2022. A week prior to the album release, on March 31, Cabello revealed the album's track list on her social media.

== Conception and influences ==
camila
(@Camila_Cabello)
tweeted:

#DontGoYet is the first song from my next album, Familia. This album was inspired by two things: family & food. Your family by blood, but also your chosen family. Who you want to sit at the dinner table, get wine-drunk, & dance in the living room with.

To me, those are the moments that make me glad to be alive, those moments of collective joy & true vulnerability & connection with other people. I hope you enjoy it & I hope it inspires many wine drunk kitchen dance parties for you & your familia.

July 22, 2021

Familia means "family" in the Spanish language. According to Cabello, the album is about connecting with her roots. It was influenced by the "manifest collective joy" she felt during the COVID-19 pandemic, stemming from the "similar experiences of connecting" she has with her family. During a July 2021 interview with Apple Music, the singer explained that the concept of the album involves "a similar theme of being together with loved ones" and that she came up with the theme after being isolated at home due to the pandemic in 2020. Throughout the pandemic, Cabello "has gotten closer to her roots and has prioritized her family". Camila wanted to manifest it to be "that kind of family affair selfishly, because it would make me happy" and "would make my life better and that's what I want". In November 2021, Camila explained to Billboard, that a lot of the album was inspired by her relationships: "my relationships to my family, my relationship to my friends, my relationship to my partner... it's all about connections with other people".

== Writing and recording ==
According to Cabello, Familia started with her and Scott Harris writing a multitude of songs in her bedroom in Miami. They travelled to Los Angeles, where they met Mike Sabath and Ricky Reed, both who ended up producing the album with Cheche Alara. The making of the album has been referenced by Cabello as "definitely the most honest and unfiltered that I've been", presenting the singer's experiences in the past years that she "hasn't really experienced or said any of these things before". Cabello didn't know if she was going to create an album inspired by Latin music, as Familia was originally conceived as pop music. However, meeting Alara and Edgar Barrera "made it felt natural". One of the first songs the singer wrote for the album was "Hasta los Dientes", followed by "La Buena Vida" and "Bam Bam". She described the process as "an evolution of [her] feelings and [her] life". Cabello was able to "take the time to do it and write it over a period of a year and a half, where [she] was in a relationship and then [she] wasn't". "Quiet" was the last song to be included on the tracklist, as when looking at Familia's final line-up, Scott Harris and Cabello felt inspired to finish the song to ensure it was included.

"Lola" was written while the San Isidro Movement was taking place in Cuba. The song pays homage to the movement where people protested in the streets of Cuba against the dictatorship that has existed there since 1953. Cabello contacted the "Patria y Vida" singer Yotuel, who wrote his part of "Lola" and sent it to Cabello. While recording the song, she thought about "that situation in [her] life, and how different it would have been if [she] had stayed there". While recording "Psychofreak", Cabello had feelings of vulnerability and embarrassment. She felt "very anxious" in the studio and improvised a lyric. When she finished recording the track, she felt "terrible and embarrassed", but she later stated it was one of her favorites. The song is based on the singer's anxiety and the struggle of trying to be present despite feeling paranoid or insecure.

== Composition ==
The standard edition of Familia consists of 12 tracks. Willow, Ed Sheeran, María Becerra and Yotuel provide guest vocals on "Psychofreak", "Bam Bam", "Hasta los Dientes" and "Lola", respectively.

=== Songs ===
The first track, "Familia", is a 17-second trumpet opening. "Celia", the second track, is sung in Spanish, and features Cabello's cousin on background vocals and a dusky, minor-key groove. The song is about a boy falling in love with both a Cuban girl and her Latin culture, and it's titled after Cuban singer Celia Cruz. The third song, "Psychofreak", an electropop and trip-hop track, features Willow, and covers the topics of mental health and dissociation; the song contains references to Cabello's split from Fifth Harmony in 2016. The upbeat fourth track, "Bam Bam", featuring Ed Sheeran, is a tropical-inspired pop and Latin-pop song over a salsa-infused and reggaeton production.

"La Buena Vida" ("The Good Life"), the fifth track, is a mariachi track based on feelings of loneliness while in a long-distance relationship. The sixth song, "Quiet", is a synth-pop song that talks about how physical closeness with a romantic partner helps dealing with anxiety. In "Boys Don't Cry", a slow R&B ballad, Cabello comforts her lover while helping him reconcile with his own masculinity. "Hasta los Dientes" ("Even the Teeth"), the eighth track, is a nu-disco and reggaeton-disco song that features María Becerra and focuses on an all-consuming, obsessive love. The ninth song, "No Doubt", is a Latin-influenced song that has a topic of sexual jealousy and the anxieties that come with a relationship.

The tenth track and lead single "Don't Go Yet" is a Latin pop, pop and tropical love song about being together with someone and never wanting to be apart from them. The song is accompanied by a Latin influenced production consisting of strings, maracas, drums, trumpets, flamenco guitar and handclapping overlapping as beats. The eleventh song, "Lola", features Yotuel, and is a Latin jazz, R&B and folk ballad narrating the story of the eponymous Cuban girl Lola and the struggles of growing up with a lack of resources and opportunities. The closing track, "Everyone at this Party", is an acoustic ballad detailing the aftermath of a breakup.

== Release and promotion ==
While celebrating her 25th birthday on March 3, 2022, Cabello confirmed that the album would be released on April 8, and posted its cover artwork on the same day. Preorders for the album began the same day. The album was released on April 8, 2022, via retail stores, digital music and streaming platforms, as well as on Cabello's website. The alternative cover version CDs with a poster were made exclusive to Target in US. The limited deluxe softpack version with an autographed photo was made available on Cabello's webstore globally. Vinyl LPs from the album was released on July 12, 2022.

=== Marketing ===
Cabello gave interviews to iHeartRadio's Enrique Santos and Zane Lowe from Apple Music, Los 40 and sang "Bam Bam" on The Late Late Show with James Corden. She appeared on the magazine cover of Bustle in August 2021 and talked about the album, and embraced the Mexico version of Vogue in March 2022 as well. Cabello appeared on The Tonight Show Starring Jimmy Fallon show on April 8, as well as Saturday Night Live as the musical guest on April 9.

=== Artwork ===
On March 11, the singer posted handwritten notes and photos fashioned in a scrapbook-style booklet from the journal that is included on the deluxe version of Familia. In it, Cabello details her journey with anxiety, something that therapy helped her work through. On March 28 and 29, Cabello posted snippets of two songs from the album on her social media. The cover artwork of Familia depicts barefoot Cabello against a room with green door, while wearing a sequined black dress with a multicolored ruffled skirt and hugging a smiling young girl in her arms. The insert of the CD shows Cabello in an orange dress fanned out around her, against the backdrop of some plants and trees. In the alternative cover available for the Target-exclusive edition of the album, the singer is seen lying in pink clothes on a green carpet next to two green armchairs.

=== Singles ===
"Don't Go Yet" served as the lead single of Familia. It was accompanied by a music video posted to YouTube, directed by Philippa Price and Pilar Zeta. Both were released on July 23, 2021. It was serviced to US pop and adult pop radio formats on July 27. The song debuted and peaked at number 42 on the Billboard Hot 100, 28 on the Billboard Global 200 and 37 on the UK Singles Chart, marking Cabello's 12th UK Top 40 hit.

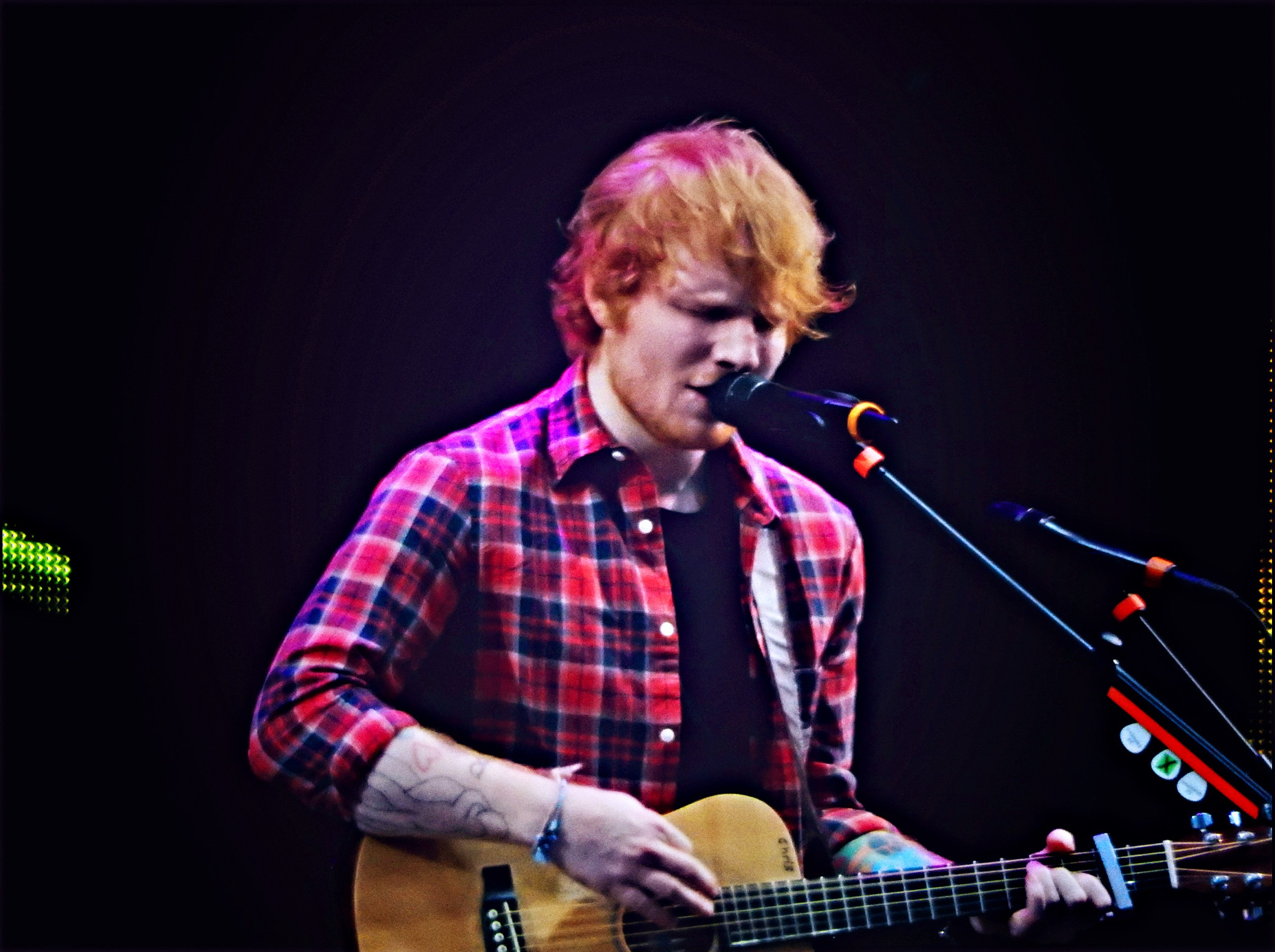
"Bam Bam", the second single of Familia, features vocals from English singer-songwriter Ed Sheeran.

"Bam Bam" featuring English singer-songwriter Ed Sheeran, was announced as the second single on February 21, 2022, and was released on March 4, 2022, a day after Cabello's 25th birthday. The accompanying music video directed by Mia Barnes, premiered on the same day. On the Billboard Global 200, it marked Cabello's first top ten song, debuting at number 10, before peaking at number 5, Cabello's highest-peaking song ever. It debuted at number 23 on the Billboard Hot 100 before rising to a new peak of 21 in its eighth week. and entered at number 10 on the Canadian Hot 100, before rising to number 4, Cabello's 3rd Top 5 hit. In the UK, "Bam Bam" debuted on the UK Singles Chart at number 22, before rising in the next weeks to number 7, marking Cabello's fifth top 10 entry.

"Psychofreak" featuring Willow, was teased on TikTok by Cabello on February 15, 2022 and announced as the third single on April 7, 2022, the music video was released on 8, April 2022 and was directed by Charlotte Rutherford, the music video was aired on the day of Familia's release. Psychofreak debuted on the UK Singles Chart at number 73, marking Cabello's 22nd entry on the chart. Psychofreak peaked at 50 on the Billboard Global 200, and 75 on the Billboard Hot 100, marking Cabello's milestone 20th entry.

"Hasta los Dientes" featuring Maria Becerra was teased prior to Familia's release on TikTok. A music video for the song was released on May 13, 2022. Hasta los Dientes charted modestly across South America, reaching a peak of 28 on the Argentinian Singles Chart, marking Cabello's second Top 30 hit ever and 2nd highest-peaking song on the charts.

=== Live performances ===
On July 23, 2021, Cabello performed "Don't Go Yet" for the first time on The Tonight Show Starring Jimmy Fallon. For the performance, Cabello was joined onstage by a group of dancers, dressed in '80s costumes. The same day, she sang the song in a bar in New York City. On September 7, 2021, Cabello performed the song on BBC Radio One in the Live Lounge, accompanied with Cheche Alara playing the accordion. On September 12, Cabello went on to perform it at the 2021 MTV Video Music Awards in a Carmen Miranda inspired costume, with a Brazilian music inspired dance break produced and arranged by Cheche Alara. On September 23, Cabello performed it at the 2021 Billboard Latin Music Awards, with a new high energy music production and arrangement by Alara. On October 15, 2021, Cabello performed "Dont Go Yet" and "La Buena Vida" at NPR's Tiny Desk for Hispanic Heritage Month with an 'El Tiny' takeover of the concert series performed at home. On March 4, 2022, Cabello made a debut performance of "Bam Bam" on The Late Late Show with James Corden. On March 29, the singer and Sheeran performed the song for the first time together at the Concert for Ukraine benefit concert at Resorts World Arena in Birmingham. Cabello performed "Bam Bam" and "Psychofreak" on Saturday Night Live on April 9. On April 12, Cabello performed "Bam Bam", "Psychofreak" and debuted "Boys Don't Cry" at The Today Show concert.

=== Familia: Welcome to the Family ===
On March 15, Camila Cabello announced a TikTok concert, titled Familia: Welcome to the Family, to celebrate the release of Familia. The singer played on the video platform on April 7. The show featured debut performances of tracks from the album. The online performance was described as an "immersive and inventive music experience" and utilized XR, which helped create a virtual world for each song to "complement the event's choreography, changing sets and costumes".

== Critical reception ==
Professional ratings
Aggregate scores
Source	Rating
AnyDecentMusic?	7.0/10
Metacritic	76/100
Review scores
Source	Rating
AllMusic	4/5 stars
The Arts Desk	3/5 stars
Clash	7/10
Entertainment Weekly	B
The Guardian	4/5 stars
The Independent	3/5 stars
NME	4/5 stars
Pitchfork	7.3/10
PopMatters	5/10
Rolling Stone	4/5 stars

Familia was met with positive reviews upon release. At Metacritic, which assigns a normalized rating out of 100 to reviews from professional publications, the album received an average score of 76, based on nine reviews, indicating "generally favorable reviews".

Reviewing positively for NME, Nick Levine called the album "[Cabello's] richest and most compelling album yet", having delved into her heritage and psyche. In a similar review, Rolling Stone critic Tomás Mier wrote that the album is "an imperfect yet revealing mosaic of Cabello's Cuban-Mexican heritage". While noting the multiple changes in style as quite disorienting, Mier complimented the album's raw and honest lyrics, comparing it to reading Cabello's diary. In a review for The Guardian, Alim Kheraj praised the album's vibrant Latin motifs—"honest and humming with artistic intent"—and noted the recurring theme of "self-sabotage and paranoia".

Clash Magazine reviewed positively, saying "Familia is Cabello revitalised, marking a shift in sound much closer to home. This album truly feels like a love letter to Cabello's Cuban roots, luxuriating in the vibrancy of Latin pop and allowing it's bright, joyous flow to melt away the heartbreak." Stereo Gum said, "Cabello processes the last 10 years of her life — on her raw third album, Familia, which she has called her best album so far. Honestly, I agree with her" and with (Familia) "Cabello is on a solid path in her growth from a radio-friendly singles artist to a cohesive albums artist."

Writing for Pitchfork, Olivia Horn commended Cabello for embarking on a "more immersive exploration of her musical heritage" on Familia and "abandoning the revolving-door approach" of her two previous albums in favor of working with a smaller group of "Latin pop veterans". On Cabello's vocals Horn wrote that "even when she's mad, Camila sounds like she's having fun", producing an album that "swings big and often hits".

In their mid-year review Rolling Stone included Familia on their Best Albums of 2022 So Far, commenting, "this album's Latin-pop banger "Hasta los Dientes," and lead single, "Don't Go Yet," showcase Cabello's natural ability to make the sounds of her culture accessible to any audience, regardless of language. At times, the stylistic shifts can give the record a bit of a mod-podge feel, but the artist holds it together by keeping us engaged with her story".

== Commercial performance ==
Familia debuted at number 10 on the US Billboard 200 dated April 23, 2022 with 27,500 equivalent album units earned, with 11,500 pure sales, 14,500 stream-equivalent sales (resulting from 20.26 million on demand streams) and 1,500 track-equivalent sales. Familia spent 11 non-consecutive weeks charting on the US Billboard 200 before departing. Familia peaked at number 23 on the US Vinyl Albums Chart, her second entry onto the chart.

In Canada, Familia debuted at number six on the Canadian Albums Chart, marking Cabello's third top-10 debut, and charted for 19 weeks.

In the UK, Familia debuted at number nine on the UK Albums Chart, surpassing Cabello's previous album Romance, which peaked at number 14. Elsewhere in Europe, Familia reached the top 10 in the Netherlands, Norway, Portugal, and Scotland and debuted at number four on the Spanish Albums Chart, making it Cabello's second-highest debut there.

Familia also became Cabello's first album to chart on the Uruguay Albums Chart, peaking at Number 13.

== Track listing ==
Familia track listing
No.	Title	Writer(s)	Producer(s)	Length
1.	"Familia"	Mike Cordone	Ricky Reed	0:18
2.	"Celia"	Camila Cabello; Eric Frederic; Jose Castillo; Edgar Barrera; Carolina Bern	Reed; Castillo; Barrera	2:33
3.	"Psychofreak" (featuring Willow)	Cabello; Willow Smith; Tom Peyton; Frederic; Scott Harris	Reed; Peyton	3:21
4.	"Bam Bam" (featuring Ed Sheeran)	Cabello; Sheeran; Harris; Frederic; Barrera; Cheche Alara	Reed; Barrera; Alara	3:26
5.	"La Buena Vida"	Cabello; Frederic; Barrera; Alara	Alara; Barrera; Reed	3:17
6.	"Quiet"	Cabello; Harris; Frederic	Reed; Harris	2:43
7.	"Boys Don't Cry"	Cabello; Jonah Shy; Harris; Frederic	Reed; Harris	3:43
8.	"Hasta los Dientes" (featuring María Becerra)	Cabello; Becerra; Barrera; Frederic; Daniel Real	Reed; Barrera	3:08
9.	"No Doubt"	Cabello; Frederic; Mike Sabath; Harris	Reed; Sabath	3:11
10.	"Don't Go Yet"	Cabello; Frederic; Sabath; Harris	Reed; Sabath	2:45
11.	"Lola" (featuring Yotuel)	Cabello; Yotuel; Harris; Sabath	Harris; Sabath	3:05
12.	"Everyone at This Party"	Cabello; Harris; Frederic	Reed	2:49
Total length:				34:19

== Personnel ==
Musicians

- Camila Cabello – lead vocals
- Mike Cordone – trumpet (1, 2, 4, 7), flugelhorn (7)
- José Castillo – guitar (2, 6, 8), programming (2)
- Ricky Reed – vocals (2), programming (3, 4, 6, 7, 9, 10), background vocals (5), keyboards (6), drums (7), bass (10)
- Rafael Padilla – percussion (3, 9)
- Tom Payton – programming (3)
- Willow Smith – vocals (3)
- Cheche Alara – arrangement (4), background vocals (5)
- Carlos Murguía – background vocals (4)
- Antonio Sol – background vocals (4)
- James Zavaleta – background vocals (4)
- Carlitos del Puerto – bass (4)
- Ramón Stagnaro – guitar (4, 5)
- Luis Conte – percussion (4, 5)
- Kevin Ricard – percussion (4)
- Edgar Barrera – programming (4)
- George Shelby – saxophone (4)
- Eric Jorgensen – trombone (4)
- Gerardo Rodriguez – trumpet (4)
- Harry Kim – trumpet (4, 5)
- Ed Sheeran – vocals (4)
- Luis Zambrano – background vocals, violin (5)
- Rufino Menjares – background vocals (5)
- Adam Ramirez – background vocals (5)
- Stephanie Amaro – guitar (5)
- Leader Chapotin – trumpet (5)
- Angel Guzman – violin (5)
- Charlie Bisharat – violin (5)
- Jimmy Cuellar – violin (5)
- Maira Solís – violin (5)
- Songa Lee – violin (5)
- Alejandro Cabello – vocals (5)
- Scott Harris – keyboards (6), guitar (10)
- Big One – programming (8)
- María Becerra – vocals (8)
- Mike Sabath – bass, guitar (9); programming (9, 10); acoustic bass, percussion, vocals (10); drums (11)
- Carlos Henriquez – acoustic bass, vocals (10)
- Mike Ciro – guitar, vocals (10)
- Pedrito Martinez – congas, percussion, vocals (10); drums (11)
- Manuel Marquez – percussion, timbales, vocals (10); drums (11)
- Yeissonn Villamar – piano (10, 11), vocals (10)
- John Ellis – saxophone, vocals (10)
- Marshall Gilkes – trombone, vocals (10)
- Mike Rodríguez – trumpet (10, 11), vocals (10)
- Sebastian Natal – bass (11)
- Kelly Rosenthal – guitar (12)

Technical

- Emerson Mancini – mastering
- Manny Marroquin – mixing
- Bill Malina – engineering (1–5, 7, 9, 12)
- Ricky Reed – engineering (2, 3, 5–9)
- Ethan Shumaker – engineering (4, 12)
- Mike Sabath – engineering (9, 11)
- Bart Schoudel – engineering (10), engineering assistance (2, 3, 5, 6, 8)
- Steve Xia – engineering (10, 11)
- James Kirk – engineering assistance (1–5, 7)
- Logan Taylor – engineering assistance (4)
- Piece Eatah – engineering assistance (5)
- Gianluca Girard – engineering assistance (10)
- Nicky Young – engineering assistance (10, 11)

Artwork

- Alfie Allen – art direction, design
- Charlotte Rutherford – creative direction
- Sebastián Faena – cover photo
- Sasha Samsonova – photography

== Charts ==
=== Weekly charts ===
Weekly chart performance for Familia
Chart (2022)	Peak position
Australian Albums (ARIA)	27
Austrian Albums (Ö3 Austria)	22
Belgian Albums (Ultratop Flanders)	21
Belgian Albums (Ultratop Wallonia)	23
Canadian Albums (Billboard)	6
Czech Albums (ČNS IFPI)	78
Danish Albums (Hitlisten)	20
Dutch Albums (Album Top 100)	9
Finnish Albums (Suomen virallinen lista)	17
French Albums (SNEP)	43
German Albums (Offizielle Top 100)	27
Irish Albums (Official Charts)	36
Italian Albums (FIMI)	19
Japanese Albums (Oricon)	57
Japanese Hot Albums (Billboard Japan)	49
Lithuanian Albums (AGATA)	17
New Zealand Albums (RMNZ)	26
Norwegian Albums (VG-lista)	7
Polish Albums (ZPAV)	25
Portuguese Albums (AFP)	8
Scottish Albums (Official Charts)	8
Slovak Albums (ČNS IFPI)	60
Spanish Albums (Promusicae)	4
Swedish Albums (Sverigetopplistan)	19
Swiss Albums (Schweizer Hitparade)	13
UK Albums (Official Charts)	9
Uruguayan Albums (CUD)	13
US Billboard 200	10

=== Year-end charts ===
Year-end chart performance for Familia
Chart (2022)	Position
French Albums (SNEP)	156
Lithuanian Albums (AGATA)	96

== Certifications ==
Certifications and sales for Familia
Region	Certification	Certified units/sales
Brazil (Pro-Música Brasil)	Platinum	40,000^{‡}
Canada (Music Canada)	Gold	40,000^{‡}
France (SNEP)	Gold	50,000^{‡}
Hungary (MAHASZ)	Platinum	4,000^{‡}
Italy (FIMI)	Gold	25,000^{‡}
New Zealand (RMNZ)	Gold	7,500^{‡}
Poland (ZPAV)	Gold	10,000^{‡}
^{‡} Sales+streaming figures based on certification alone.

== Release history ==
Release history for Familia
Region	Date	Format	Label	Ref.
Various	April 8, 2022	Box set; cassette; CD; digital download; streaming	Epic	
Various	July 12, 2022	Vinyl	Epic	
