= List of Ultratop 50 number-one singles of 2022 =

These hits topped the Ultratop 50 in 2022.

Flanders
Issue date	Song	Artist
1 January	"Merry Christmas"	Ed Sheeran and Elton John
8 January	"Easy on Me"	Adele
15 January	"Easy on Me"	Adele
22 January	"L'enfer"	Stromae
29 January	"Dat heb jij gedaan"	Meau
5 February	"Dat heb jij gedaan"	Meau
12 February	"Dat heb jij gedaan"	Meau
19 February	"Dat heb jij gedaan"	Meau
26 February	"Dat heb jij gedaan"	Meau
5 March	"Dit is wat mijn mama zei"	Metejoor
12 March	"L'enfer"	Stromae
19 March	"Dit is wat mijn mama zei"	Metejoor
26 March	"Mijn kleine presidentje"	Jaap Reesema
2 April	"Dit is wat mijn mama zei"	Metejoor
9 April	"As It Was"	Harry Styles
16 April	"As It Was"	Harry Styles
23 April	"As It Was"	Harry Styles
30 April	"As It Was"	Harry Styles
7 May	"As It Was"	Harry Styles
14 May	"As It Was"	Harry Styles
21 May	"Miss You"	Jérémie Makiese
28 May	"As It Was"	Harry Styles
4 June	"As It Was"	Harry Styles
11 June	"As It Was"	Harry Styles
18 June	"As It Was"	Harry Styles
25 June	"As It Was"	Harry Styles
2 July	"As It Was"	Harry Styles
9 July	"As It Was"	Harry Styles
16 July	"As It Was"	Harry Styles
23 July	"Ferrari"	James Hype and Miggy Dela Rosa
30 July	"Ferrari"	James Hype and Miggy Dela Rosa
6 August	"Ferrari"	James Hype and Miggy Dela Rosa
13 August	"Ongewoon"	Pommelien Thijs
20 August	"Snap"	Rosa Linn
27 August	"Snap"	Rosa Linn
3 September	"Snap"	Rosa Linn
10 September	"Snap"	Rosa Linn
17 September	"Snap"	Rosa Linn
24 September	"Snap"	Rosa Linn
1 October	"Snap"	Rosa Linn
8 October	"I'm Good (Blue)"	David Guetta and Bebe Rexha
15 October	"I'm Good (Blue)"	David Guetta and Bebe Rexha
22 October	"I'm Good (Blue)"	David Guetta and Bebe Rexha
29 October	"I'm Good (Blue)"	David Guetta and Bebe Rexha
5 November	"I'm Good (Blue)"	David Guetta and Bebe Rexha
12 November	"Anti-Hero"	Taylor Swift
19 November	"I'm Good (Blue)"	David Guetta and Bebe Rexha
26 November	"Warrior"	Oscar and the Wolf
3 December	"Warrior"	Oscar and the Wolf
10 December	"Anti-Hero"	Taylor Swift
17 December	"Anti-Hero"	Taylor Swift
24 December	"Anti-Hero"	Taylor Swift
31 December	"All I Want for Christmas Is You"	Mariah Carey

Wallonia
Issue date	Song	Artist
1 January	"Bruxelles je t'aime"	Angèle
8 January	"Bruxelles je t'aime"	Angèle
15 January	"Bruxelles je t'aime"	Angèle
22 January	"L'enfer"	Stromae
29 January	"L'enfer"	Stromae
5 February	"ABCDEFU"	Gayle
12 February	"ABCDEFU"	Gayle
19 February	"ABCDEFU"	Gayle
26 February	"L'enfer"	Stromae
5 March	"L'enfer"	Stromae
12 March	"L'enfer"	Stromae
19 March	"L'enfer"	Stromae
26 March	"L'enfer"	Stromae
2 April	"L'enfer"	Stromae
9 April	"ABCDEFU"	Gayle
16 April	"L'enfer"	Stromae
23 April	"L'enfer"	Stromae
30 April	"As It Was"	Harry Styles
7 May	"As It Was"	Harry Styles
14 May	"As It Was"	Harry Styles
21 May	"As It Was"	Harry Styles
28 May	"As It Was"	Harry Styles
4 June	"As It Was"	Harry Styles
11 June	"As It Was"	Harry Styles
18 June	"As It Was"	Harry Styles
25 June	"As It Was"	Harry Styles
2 July	"Chop (Nouvelle école)"	Fresh
9 July	"Chop (Nouvelle école)"	Fresh
16 July	"Chop (Nouvelle école)"	Fresh
23 July	"Calm Down"	Rema
30 July	"Calm Down"	Rema
6 August	"Calm Down"	Rema
13 August	"Calm Down"	Rema
20 August	"Calm Down"	Rema
27 August	"Calm Down"	Rema
3 September	"Calm Down"	Rema
10 September	"Calm Down"	Rema
17 September	"Calm Down"	Rema
24 September	"Calm Down"	Rema
1 October	"Calm Down"	Rema
8 October	"Calm Down"	Rema
15 October	"I'm Good (Blue)"	David Guetta and Bebe Rexha
22 October	"I Ain't Worried"	OneRepublic
29 October	"I Ain't Worried"	OneRepublic
5 November	"I'm Good (Blue)"	David Guetta and Bebe Rexha
12 November	"I'm Good (Blue)"	David Guetta and Bebe Rexha
19 November	"Unholy"	Sam Smith and Kim Petras
26 November	"Unholy"	Sam Smith and Kim Petras
3 December	"Snap"	Rosa Linn
10 December	"Snap"	Rosa Linn
17 December	"Snap"	Rosa Linn
24 December	"Lift Me Up"	Rihanna
31 December	"All I Want for Christmas Is You"	Mariah Carey

Flanders ranking of most weeks at number 1
Position	Artist	Weeks #1
1	Harry Styles	12
2	Rosa Linn	7
3	David Guetta	6
3	Bebe Rexha	6
4	Meau	5
5	Taylor Swift	4
6	Metejoor	3
6	James Hype	3
6	Miggy Dela Rosa	3
7	Adele	2
7	Stromae	2
7	Oscar and the Wolf	2
8	Ed Sheeran	1
8	Elton John	1
8	Jaap Reesema	1
8	Jérémie Makiese	1
8	Pommelien Thijs	1
8	Mariah Carey	1

Wallonia ranking of most weeks at number 1
Position	Artist	Weeks #1
1	Rema	12
2	Stromae	10
3	Harry Styles	9
4	Gayle	4
5	Angèle	3
5	Fresh	3
5	David Guetta	3
5	Bebe Rexha	3
5	Rosa Linn	3
6	OneRepublic	2
6	Sam Smith	2
6	Kim Petras	2
7	Rihanna	1
7	Mariah Carey	1

== See also ==
- List of number-one albums of 2022 (Belgium)
- 2022 in music
