= List of number-one albums of 2022 (Belgium) =

The Belgian Albums Chart, divided into the two main regions Flanders and Wallonia, ranks the best-performing albums in Belgium, as compiled by Ultratop.

== Flanders ==
List of number-one albums of 2022 in Flanders
Issue date	Album	Artist	Reference
1 January	Waterval	K3	
8 January	Waterval	K3	
15 January	Waterval	K3	
22 January	Waterval	K3	
29 January	Waterval	K3	
5 February	Ibiza Stories	Lil' Kleine	
12 February	Waterval	K3	
19 February	Metejoor	Metejoor	
26 February	Metejoor	Metejoor	
5 March	Metejoor	Metejoor	
12 March	Multitude	Stromae	
19 March	Multitude	Stromae	
26 March	Multitude	Stromae	
2 April	Jonge wolven	Clouseau	
9 April	Jonge wolven	Clouseau	
16 April	#LikeMe – Seizoen 3	#LikeMe cast	
23 April	#LikeMe – Seizoen 3	#LikeMe cast	
30 April	Jonge wolven	Clouseau	
7 May	Zeit	Rammstein	
14 May	Maksim	Maksim	
21 May	Mr. Morale & the Big Steppers	Kendrick Lamar	
28 May	Harry's House	Harry Styles	
4 June	Harry's House	Harry Styles	
11 June	Harry's House	Harry Styles	
18 June	Proof	BTS	
25 June	Moeras	Stikstof	
2 July	Harry's House	Harry Styles	
9 July	Harry's House	Harry Styles	
16 July	Harry's House	Harry Styles	
23 July	Harry's House	Harry Styles	
30 July	Harry's House	Harry Styles	
6 August	Renaissance	Beyoncé	
13 August	Renaissance	Beyoncé	
20 August	Renaissance	Beyoncé	
27 August	Finally Enough Love: 50 Number Ones	Madonna	
3 September	SOS	Camille	
10 September	SOS	Camille	
17 September	No Sleep in LA	Blackwave.	
24 September	SOS	Camille	
1 October	Sahar	Tamino	
8 October	Opex	Arno	
15 October	Opex	Arno	
22 October	Opex	Arno	
29 October	Midnights	Taylor Swift	
5 November	Midnights	Taylor Swift	
12 November	Midnights	Taylor Swift	
19 November	Faith in the Future	Louis Tomlinson	
26 November	Vleugels	K3	
3 December	Vleugels	K3	
10 December	SOS	Camille	
17 December	SOS	Camille	
24 December	SOS	Camille	
31 December	SOS	Camille	

== Wallonia ==
List of number-one albums of 2022 in Wallonia
Issue date	Album	Artist	Reference
1 January	Nonante-Cinq	Angèle	
8 January	Nonante-Cinq	Angèle	
15 January	Nonante-Cinq	Angèle	
22 January	Jefe	Ninho	
29 January	Nonante-Cinq	Angèle	
5 February	Jefe	Ninho	
12 February	V	Vald	
19 February	V	Vald	
26 February	Civilisation	Orelsan	
5 March	Rock Believer	Scorpions	
12 March	Multitude	Stromae	
19 March	Multitude	Stromae	
26 March	Multitude	Stromae	
2 April	Never Let Me Go	Placebo	
9 April	Multitude	Stromae	
16 April	Multitude	Stromae	
23 April	Multitude	Stromae	
30 April	Multitude	Stromae	
7 May	Zeit	Rammstein	
14 May	Métèque	Renaud	
21 May	Métèque	Renaud	
28 May	Harry's House	Harry Styles	
4 June	Tout peut arriver	Roméo Elvis	
11 June	Extraterrestre	Jul	
18 June	Proof	BTS	
25 June	Extraterrestre	Jul	
2 July	Les autres c'est nous	Bigflo & Oli	
9 July	KMT	Gazo	
16 July	KMT	Gazo	
23 July	KMT	Gazo	
30 July	KMT	Gazo	
6 August	Renaissance	Beyoncé	
13 August	KMT	Gazo	
20 August	KMT	Gazo	
27 August	Finally Enough Love: 50 Number Ones	Madonna	
3 September	Will of the People	Muse	
10 September	Chroniques d'un Cupidon	Slimane	
17 September	Saint-Clair	Benjamin Biolay	
24 September	Mauvais ordre	Lomepal	
1 October	Mauvais ordre	Lomepal	
8 October	Opex	Arno	
15 October	Mauvais ordre	Lomepal	
22 October	Mauvais ordre	Lomepal	
29 October	Midnights	Taylor Swift	
5 November	Civilisation	Orelsan	
12 November	Civilisation	Orelsan	
19 November	Épicentre	M. Pokora	
26 November	Encore une fois	Patrick Bruel	
3 December	L'Emprise	Mylène Farmer	
10 December	L'Emprise	Mylène Farmer	
17 December	L'Emprise	Mylène Farmer	
24 December	Encore une fois	Patrick Bruel	
31 December	Encore une fois	Patrick Bruel	

== See also ==
- List of Ultratop 50 number-one singles of 2022
