= Lo Siento BB:/ =

2021 single by Tainy, Bad Bunny and Julieta Venegas

Single by Tainy, Bad Bunny and Julieta Venegas

from the album Data
- Language: Spanish
- Released: October 5, 2021
- Genre: Reggaeton
- Length: 3:27
- Label: Neon16; Interscope
- Songwriters: Marcos Efraín Masís; Benito Martínez; Julieta Venegas Percevault
- Producer: Tainy

Tainy singles chronology
"Summer of Love" (2021)	"Lo Siento BB:/" (2021)	"Oh Na Na" (2021)

Bad Bunny singles chronology
"Volví" (2021)	"Lo Siento BB:/" (2021)	"Te Deseo Lo Mejor" (2021)

Julieta Venegas singles chronology
"Acaríñame" (2019)	"Lo Siento BB:/" (2021)	"Mismo Amor" (2022)

Music video
- "Lo Siento BB:/" on YouTube

"Lo Siento BB:/" (English: "I'm Sorry Baby") is a song by Puerto Rican record producer Tainy, Puerto Rican rapper Bad Bunny and Mexican singer Julieta Venegas. It was released on October 5, 2021, through Neon16 and Interscope Records, along with its music video. The song charted at number 2 on the Billboard's Hot Latin Songs chart and reached number 12 on the Billboard Global 200. It received nominations for Best Reggaeton Performance and Best Urban Song at the 23rd Annual Latin Grammy Awards, winning the first one.

== Commercial performance ==
On the Billboard Global 200, the song charted at number 12 when in the Billboard Hot 100 the song peaked at number 51. Also, the track peaked at number 93, giving Venegas her first top 100 song in that chart since "Eres para mí" featuring Anita Tijoux.

== Music video ==
On October 5, 2021, Tainy dropped the music video for "Lo Siento BB:/" which was directed by Stillz, the longtime collaborator of Bad Bunny who also directs the music video of "Thats What I Want" by Lil Nas X.

== Charts ==
=== Weekly charts ===
Weekly chart performance for "Lo Siento BB:/"
Chart (2021–2022)	Peak position
Argentina Hot 100 (Billboard)	39
Bolivia (Billboard)	4
Chile (Billboard)	6
Colombia (Billboard)	9
Ecuador (Billboard)	3
Global 200 (Billboard)	12
Mexico (Billboard)	1
Mexico (Billboard Mexican Airplay)	49
Mexico (Billboard Espanol Airplay)	17
Peru (Billboard)	2
Portugal (AFP)	91
Spain (Promusicae)	5
Switzerland (Schweizer Hitparade)	74
US Billboard Hot 100	51
US Hot Latin Songs (Billboard)	2
US Latin Rhythm Airplay (Billboard)	18

=== Year-end charts ===
2021 year-end chart performance for "Lo Siento BB:/"
Chart (2021)	Position
US Hot Latin Songs (Billboard)	72

2022 year-end chart performance for "Lo Siento BB:/"
Chart (2022)	Position
Global 200 (Billboard)	78
US Hot Latin Songs (Billboard)	25

== Certifications ==
Certifications and sales for "Lo Siento BB:/"
Region	Certification	Certified units/sales
Spain (Promusicae)	2× Platinum	120,000^{‡}
United States (RIAA)	31× Platinum (Latin)	1,860,000^{‡}
^{‡} Sales+streaming figures based on certification alone.
