= Psychofreak =

Single by Camila Cabello featuring Willow

from the album Familia
- Released: April 8, 2022
- Studio: Camila's House (Los Angeles, CA); Gold Diggers Sound (Los Angeles, CA)
- Genre: Pop; trip hop
- Length: 3:21
- Songwriter(s): Camila Cabello; Willow Smith; Scott Harris; Eric Frederic; Tom Peyton
- Producer(s): Ricky Reed; Peyton

Camila Cabello singles chronology
"Bam Bam" (2022)	"Psychofreak" (2022)	"Hasta los Dientes" (2022)

Willow singles chronology
"Purge" (2022)	"Psychofreak" (2022)	"Where You Are" (2022)

Music video
- "Psychofreak" on YouTube

"Psychofreak" (stylized in lowercase) is a song by American singer and songwriter Camila Cabello from her third studio album Familia (2022). It was released by Epic Records on April 8, 2022, as the third single from the album. The song features American singer Willow and was written by Cabello, Willow, Scott Harris, Eric Frederic and Tom Peyton.

== Background ==
"Psychofreak" is based on Cabello's anxiety. Cabello said that one line in the song "I don't blame the girls for how it went down" is about her departure from American girl group Fifth Harmony in December 2016. The line also references the group's single "Down" (2017), which was the first release by the group without Cabello. The song refers to her previous relationship with ex-partner Shawn Mendes.

== Critical reception ==
AllMusic wrote that "Psychofreak" sounds like '90s trip-hop". Nick Levine of NME felt that the song "proves it's still possible to write a smart and original song about mental health in 2022".

Rolling Stone reviewed the song, saying "Camila Cabello wears her heart on her sleeve and faces the scar tissue of her past on 'Psycho Freak.' The Familia track, which features haunting vocals from Willow, paints a picture of the Cuban-Mexican singer’s anxiety as she shares her truth in a vulnerable way."

== Commercial performance ==
"Psychofreak" peaked at number seventy-five on the Billboard Hot 100, marking Cabello's milestone twentieth entry on the chart. It peaked at number fifty on the Billboard Global 200, Cabello's 6th entry.

The song peaked at number seventy-three on the UK singles chart.

== Live performances ==
"Psychofreak" received its debut performance on TikTok's Familia: Welcome to the Family concert on April 7, 2022, alongside performances of the rest of the album's songs. The song was performed by Cabello and Willow together on Saturday Night Live on April 9, 2022.

Cabello performed "Psychofreak" during her festival appearances at Wango Tango and WAZMATAZZ on June 4 and 5 respectively.

== Charts ==
Chart performance for "Psychofreak"
Chart (2022)	Peak position
Brazil (Pop Internacional)	9
Canada (Canadian Hot 100)	41
Global 200 (Billboard)	50
Greece International (IFPI)	94
Ireland (IRMA)	49
New Zealand Hot Singles (RMNZ)	5
Portugal (AFP)	107
Sweden (Sverigetopplistan)	85
UK Singles (OCC)	73
US Billboard Hot 100	75
