= Hasta los Dientes =

- Vevo's official promotional graphic

Single by Camila Cabello and María Becerra

from the album Familia
- Language: Spanish
- Released: May 13, 2022
- Studio: Camila's House (Los Angeles, CA)
- Genre: Nu-disco
- Length: 3:08
- Label: Epic
- Songwriters: Camila Cabello; María Becerra; Edgar Barrera; Eric Frederic; Daniel Real
- Producer: Ricky Reed

Camila Cabello singles chronology
"Psychofreak" (2022)	"Hasta los Dientes" (2022)	"Mon amour" (2022)

María Becerra singles chronology
"Te Espero" (2022)	"Hasta los Dientes" (2022)	"Maléfica" (2022)

Music video
- "Hasta Los Dientes" on YouTube

"Hasta los Dientes" is a song by American singer Camila Cabello and Argentine singer María Becerra, from Cabello's third studio album Familia (2022). It was released by Epic Records on May 13, 2022, as the fourth and final single from the album. It was Cabello's last single with Epic Records. The song, which focuses on an obsessive love, was described as a nu-disco song.

== Music video ==
An accompanying "space-themed" music video was released on May 13, 2022, and it was directed by Charlotte Rutherford. The clip finds Cabello and Becerra in colorful outfits and wigs, filming a performance of the song on set aboard a spaceship. The duo trade verses, delving into groovy choreography with their space disco-dressed dancers. The video ends with a live audience, TV crew and dancers applaud as Cabello and Becerra take a bow and walk hand-in-hand off the set.

== Charts ==
Chart performance for "Hasta los Dientes"
Chart (2022–2025)	Peak position
Argentina Hot 100 (Billboard)	24
Argentina Airplay (Monitor Latino)	4
Chile Pop (Monitor Latino)	18
Ecuador Pop (Monitor Latino)	16
El Salvador (Monitor Latino)	16
France Overseas Airplay (SNEP)	57
Hungary (Single Top 40)	28
Mexico (Billboard Espanol Airplay)	29
Panama (PRODUCE)	34
Panama Pop (Monitor Latino)	16
Peru Pop (Monitor Latino)	15
Uruguay (Monitor Latino)	6
