= Don't Go Yet =

2021 single by Camila Cabello

Single by Camila Cabello

from the album Familia
- Language: English; Spanish
- Released: July 23, 2021
- Studio: Dimension 70 (New York, New York)
- Genre: Latin pop; salsa
- Length: 2:44
- Label: Epic
- Songwriters: Camila Cabello; Eric Frederic; Mike Sabath; Scott Harris
- Producers: Ricky Reed; Mike Sabath

Camila Cabello singles chronology
"First Man" (2020)	"Don't Go Yet" (2021)	"Oh Na Na" (2021)

Music video
- "Don't Go Yet" on YouTube

"Don't Go Yet" is a song by American singer and songwriter Camila Cabello from her third studio album Familia (2022). It was released on July 23, 2021, as the lead single from the album by Epic Records. The song was serviced to US contemporary hit radio and rhythmic radio formats on July 27, 2021.

"Don't Go Yet" was written by Cabello, Scott Harris, Eric Frederic and Mike Sabath, and produced by the latter two. It is a Latin influenced pop and tropical love song, with a scratchy flamenco guitar, luscious ad-libs and "handclapping overlapping as" beats. Lyrically, the song tells a story about being together with someone and never wanting to be apart from them. An accompanying music video, directed by Philippa Price and Pilar Zeta, was released alongside the song launch. The track received its debut performance on The Tonight Show Starring Jimmy Fallon.

Upon its release, "Don't Go Yet" was well-received by critics, who compared it to the works of Gloria Estefan. Commercially, the song reached the top ten in Puerto Rico, Belgium, the Netherlands, Poland, and Panama, whilst reaching the top twenty in a further seven.

== Background ==
Cabello first teased the song on July 14, using her Instagram account by sharing a close-up of her face along with the caption, "listos?" which translates from Spanish to English as "Ready?". On July 16, 2021, Camila announced via her social media accounts that "Don't Go Yet" would be released on July 23. Alongside the announcement, she also revealed the song's cover artwork. The singer is seen wearing a large earring and black outfit teamed with long black gloves. The following week, Cabello continued giving teasers from the "Don't Go Yet" music video.

According to Cabello, both the song and music video were influenced by "Cuban-Mexican family parties from her childhood, where 'everybody eats dinner, and then after you put on a little cheap disco ball with lights and suddenly the living room is the dance floor'".

== Composition ==
"Don't Go Yet" was written by Cabello, Scott Harris, Mike Sabath and Eric Frederic, and produced by the latter two. The song has been described as a Latin pop, pop and tropical love song with a mix of Spanish lyrics. The Latin influenced production consists of strings, maracas, drums, trumpets, and "handclapping overlapping as" beats. Opening with "urgent", "scratchy" flamenco guitar and "luscious" ad-libs from Camila, the song plunges into swift, thumping beats. Eschewing synths and vocoders, Camila's voice is "soulful" over real instruments, from textured maracas to soaring horns.

The track also features live percussion by Cuban drummer Pedrito Martinez. The song is about the singer being together with someone and never wanting to be apart from them. The singer tells her man to shrug off his ideas of an early night and stay with her, but then explodes, as its titular phrase becomes the rallying cry of an effusive, sashaying choir. In terms of musical notation, the song is composed in the key of C minor, with a tempo of 110 beats per minute, and runs for two minutes and 44 seconds. Christine Hahn of Los Angeles Times noted that "the arrangements, especially in the choir" are reminiscent of the great Cuban orchestras of the '50s, in which a brass explosion marked the beginning of the choir and a complex percussion "made it clear that the songs were tropical."

== Critical reception ==
The song received positive reviews from music critics. Describing the song as "fun" and "exuberant", The New York Times's Lindsay Zoladz wrote "Cabello leans harder than ever into her Latin-pop roots here, but also noted that there's a "sassy rasp" to her vocals that "reminds of Doja Cat." Writing for Entertainment Tonight, Meredith B. Kile‍ named the song as "a Cuban percussion-infused, dance floor-ready single." Anamaria Sayre of NPR Music considered that the song "meshes sounds and instrumentation not only from her own Cuban heritage but Latin America at large: From rumba rhythms to flamenco claves and everything in between," and the singer "once again positions herself as la reina del Latin pop." Writing for The Daily Aztec, Trinity Bland opined that the song is a Cuban Miami music milestone, because "Cabello is carrying that torch (taking Latin pop to an international mainstream level) with the song and it can be easy to compare her to a young Gloria in this colorful single as she authentically presents her Cuban culture to fans, reaching a global audience and having fun while doing so." Furthermore, Bland also compared the song to Gloria Estefan's multiple remarkable hits, "her chant-worthy chorus reminiscent of the iconic 'O ey, o ey' from 'Rhythm Is Gonna Get You' or the emphasis on dancing like in the remarkably acclaimed 'Conga'." Cosmopolitan named "Don't Go Yet" 32nd on their list of the 55 Best New Songs of 2021.

=== Year-end lists ===
Publication	Accolade	Rank	Ref.
NPR	Alt.Latino presents the best singles of 2021	*	
Cosmopolitan	The 55 Best New Songs of 2021	32	

== Accolades ==
Awards and nominations for "Don't Go Yet"
Year	Organization	Award	Result	Ref(s)
2021	MTV Video Music Awards	Song of Summer	Nominated	
2021	LOS40 Music Awards	Best International Video	Nominated	

== Commercial performance ==
In the United States, "Don't Go Yet" debuted and peaked at Number 42 on the Billboard Hot 100 spending 9 weeks on the chart. It debuted and peaked at Number 28 on the Billboard Global 200. The track started at Number 30 on the Mainstream Top 40 chart, based on three days of airplay and would go on to peak at Number 17. The song debuted at Number eleven on the US Digital Song Sales Chart. The song debuted at Number 50 on the US Rolling Stone Top 100, marking one of the biggest debut of the week on the chart. In Canada, the song entered the Hot AC chart at number 41 based on three days of radio tracking. It ascended to Number 27 the following week. The song peaked at Number 25 on the Canadian Hot 100.

In the United Kingdom, the song peaked at Number 37 on the UK Singles Chart, marking Cabello's 12th UK Top 40 hit. In Australia "Don't Go Yet" peaked at Number 43 on the ARIA Charts.

In Spain, the song was certified Platinum in November 2021 and reached a new peak of Number 48 on Productores de Música de España Top 100 songs chart, before peaking at Number 36 on November 11. In Italy, the song was certified Platinum in December 2021 and reached its peak of 51 on Federazione Industria Musicale Italiana. "Don't Go Yet" has received further certifications of Gold in France and Switzerland.

On March 20, 2022, Don't Go Yet reached 250 million streams on Spotify, 8 months after release.

== Music video ==
The music video for "Don't Go Yet", directed by Philippa Price and Pilar Zeta, premiered on July 23, 2021. Before the music video's premiere, the singer shared stills on her social media pages. Two days before the song's release, the intro of the music video was shared on Cabello's social media which, according to her, featured "some Easter eggs".

=== Synopsis ===
A scene in the "Don't Go Yet" music video, where Cabello is sitting next to the dinner table during a family party.

The music video opens as the singer takes a ride in a classic convertible car as she switches stations on the car radio. Cabello also mentioned on her Twitter account that her grandfather's voice is playing on the radio station in the beginning. The footage then morphs into a stop-motion scene of a toy car carmaking its way up a dirt road accompanied by green hills and palm trees to a grand coral pink house, where Cabello rings the doorbell. Inside, a vibrant party with friends and family is taking place.

She joins the festivities as she sings and dances to the song. The singer is then shown dressed in a black dress with blue and red eye makeup, while dancing on the table. The next scene features Camila holding on to a man's leg as to stop him leaving. Through the video Camila switches outfits and shows different looks with bright make-up. The music video shows "the type of carefree, close-quarters family gathering, featuring many of Cabello's actual family members, including her father, sister, and cousin".

== Live performances ==
On July 23, 2021, Cabello performed "Don't Go Yet" for the first time on The Tonight Show Starring Jimmy Fallon. For the performance, Cabello was joined onstage by a group of dancers, dressed in '80s costumes. The performance received criticism from people offended by her performing with a white dancer whose skin appeared much darker in his stage makeup. In response to the criticism, Cabello said that the intention was for the dancer to look like a character with a bad fake tan. The same day, she sang the song in a bar in New York City.

On September 7, 2021, Cabello performed the song on BBC Radio One in the Live Lounge, accompanied with Cheche Alara playing the accordion. On September 12, Cabello went on to perform it at the 2021 MTV Video Music Awards in a Carmen Miranda inspired costume, with a Brazilian music inspired dance break produced and arranged by Cheche Alara. On September 23, Cabello performed it at the 2021 Billboard Latin Music Awards, with a new high energy music production and arrangement by Cheche Alara. On October 15, 2021, Cabello performed the song at NPR's Tiny Desk for Hispanic Heritage Month with an 'El Tiny' takeover of the concert series performed at home. On May 28, 2022, Cabello performed the song in the 2022 UEFA Champions League Final.

== Track listings ==
Digital download / streaming

1. "Don't Go Yet" – 2:45

Digital download / streaming – Major Lazer remix

1. "Don't Go Yet" (Major Lazer Remix) – 2:51

Digital download / streaming – Major Lazer Dub version

1. "Don't Go Yet" (Major Lazer Dub) – 6:04

== Credits and personnel ==
- Camila Cabello – lead vocals, writing
- Scott Harris – writing, guitar
- Eric Frederic – writing
- Mike Sabath – writing, production, programming, vocals
- Ricky Reed – writing, production, bass, programming
- Pilar Zeta – creative direction
- Pedrito Martinez – congas, percussion, vocals
- Carlos Henriquez – acoustic bass, vocals
- Mike Ciro – guitar, vocals
- Yeissonn Villamar – piano, vocals
- Manuel Marquez – percussion, timbales, vocals
- John Ellis – saxophone, vocals
- Marshall Gilkes – trombone, vocals
- Mike Rodriguez – trumpet, vocals
- Emerson Mancini – mastering
- Gianluca Girard – assistant engineer
- Nicky Young – assistant engineer
- Manny Marroquin – mixing
- Bart Schoudel – recording
- Steve Xia – recording

== Charts ==
=== Weekly charts ===
Weekly chart performance for "Don't Go Yet"
Chart (2021–2022)	Peak position
Argentina Hot 100 (Billboard)	62
Australia (ARIA)	43
Austria (Ö3 Austria Top 40)	55
Belgium (Ultratop 50 Flanders)	11
Belgium (Ultratop 50 Wallonia)	9
Bolivia (Monitor Latino)	15
Canada Hot 100 (Billboard)	25
Canada AC (Billboard)	22
Canada CHR/Top 40 (Billboard)	14
Canada Hot AC (Billboard)	27
CIS Airplay (TopHit)	36
Czech Republic Singles Digital (ČNS IFPI)	47
Denmark (Tracklisten)	35
Ecuador (Monitor Latino)	16
El Salvador (Monitor Latino)	19
Finland (Radiosoittolista)	27
France (SNEP)	55
Germany (GfK)	70
Global 200 (Billboard)	28
Greece (IFPI)	23
Hungary (Editors' Choice Top 40)	11
Hungary (Single Top 40)	18
Ireland (IRMA)	24
Italy (FIMI)	51
Japan Hot Overseas (Billboard Japan)	5
Latvia (EHR)	30
Lithuania (AGATA)	36
Netherlands (Dutch Top 40)	10
Netherlands (Single Top 100)	22
New Zealand Hot Singles (RMNZ)	3
Norway (VG-lista)	21
Panama (Monitor Latino)	10
Poland Airplay (ZPAV)	9
Portugal (AFP)	61
Puerto Rico (Monitor Latino)	8
Russia Airplay (TopHit)	21
Slovakia Airplay (ČNS IFPI)	4
Slovakia Singles Digital (ČNS IFPI)	19
Spain (PROMUSICAE)	36
Sweden (Sverigetopplistan)	41
Switzerland (Schweizer Hitparade)	45
UK Singles (Official Charts)	37
Ukraine Airplay (TopHit)	94
US Billboard Hot 100	42
US Adult Pop Airplay (Billboard)	22
US Dance Airplay (Billboard)	35
US Latin Airplay (Billboard)	38
US Pop Airplay (Billboard)	17
US Rhythmic Airplay (Billboard)	39
US Rolling Stone Top 100	50
Venezuela (Record Report)	35

=== Year-end charts ===
2021 year-end chart performance for "Don't Go Yet"
Chart (2021)	Position
Belgium (Ultratop Flanders)	58
Belgium (Ultratop Wallonia)	63
Canada (Canadian Hot 100)	85
Netherlands (Dutch Top 40)	58
Netherlands (Single Top 100)	97

2022 year-end chart performance for "Don't Go Yet"
Chart (2022)	Position
Belgium (Ultratop 50 Flanders)	117
Russia Airplay (TopHit)	97

== Certifications ==
Certifications for "Don't Go Yet"
Region	Certification	Certified units/sales
Belgium (BRMA)	Gold	20,000^{‡}
Canada (Music Canada)	Platinum	80,000^{‡}
Denmark (IFPI Danmark)	Gold	45,000^{‡}
France (SNEP)	Platinum	200,000^{‡}
Italy (FIMI)	Platinum	70,000^{‡}
New Zealand (RMNZ)	Gold	15,000^{‡}
Norway (IFPI Norway)	Gold	30,000^{‡}
Poland (ZPAV)	Platinum	50,000^{‡}
Portugal (AFP)	Platinum	10,000^{‡}
Spain (Promusicae)	Platinum	40,000^{‡}
Switzerland (IFPI Switzerland)	Gold	10,000^{‡}
United Kingdom (BPI)	Gold	400,000^{‡}
^{‡} Sales+streaming figures based on certification alone.

== Release history ==
Release dates and formats for "Don't Go Yet"
Region	Date	Format(s)	Version(s)	Label	Ref.
Various	July 23, 2021	Digital download; streaming	Original	Epic	
United States	July 27, 2021	Contemporary hit radio	Original	Epic	
United States	July 27, 2021	Rhythmic contemporary radio	Original	Epic	
Italy	July 30, 2021	Contemporary hit radio	Original	Sony	
Russia	July 30, 2021	Contemporary hit radio	Original	Sony	
Various	September 10, 2021	Digital download; streaming	Major Lazer remix	Epic	
Various	September 10, 2021	Digital download; streaming	Major Lazer Dub	Epic	
