= Bam Bam (Camila Cabello song) =

2022 single by Camila Cabello featuring Ed Sheeran

Single by Camila Cabello featuring Ed Sheeran

from the album Familia
- Language: English; Spanish
- Released: March 4, 2022
- Studio: EastWest Studios (Los Angeles, CA); Elysian Park (Los Angeles, CA); Gold Diggers Sound (Los Angeles, CA)
- Genre: Latin pop
- Length: 3:25
- Label: Epic
- Songwriters: Camila Cabello; Ed Sheeran; Eric Frederic; Edgar Barrera; Cheche Alara; Scott Harris
- Producers: Ricky Reed; Barrera; Alara

Camila Cabello singles chronology
| "Oh Na Na" (2021) | "Bam Bam" (2022) | "Psychofreak" (2022) |

Ed Sheeran singles chronology
| "Bad Habits" (2022) | "Bam Bam" (2022) | "Sigue" / "Forever My Love" (2022) |

Music video
- "Bam Bam" on YouTube

"Bam Bam" is a song by American singer and songwriter Camila Cabello from her third studio album Familia (2022). It was released by Epic Records on March 4, 2022, as the second single from the album. Featuring English singer and songwriter Ed Sheeran, "Bam Bam" is a Latin pop song with a tropical and salsa-infused pre-chorus and chorus. The song marks the second collaboration between Cabello and Sheeran, following "South of the Border" (which also featured Cardi B) from Sheeran's fourth studio album, No.6 Collaborations Project (2019).

"Bam Bam" received acclaim from music critics and reached number five on the Billboard Global 200 singles chart, Cabello's highest peak since the chart's creation in 2020. "Bam Bam" peaked at number twenty-one on the Billboard Hot 100 and peaked inside the top 10 in over 15 countries. It is certified Platinum or higher in fourteen countries, including Diamond in France. In November 2022, the song won the NRJ Music Award for Collaboration of the Year. It was also nominated for Best Pop Duo/Group Performance at the 2023 Grammy Awards.

== Release and promotion ==
On February 6, 2022, Cabello posted a video of her sitting in a car and lip-syncing the lyrics to "Bam Bam". She announced the song on February 21, 2022, referring to Sheeran as "one of my favorite people and artists ever". The song's cover art sees Cabello sitting on a curb with ruined makeup. Six days later, she shared another snippet on the video-sharing app TikTok, which saw her singing in both English and Spanish. On March 2, Cabello and Sheeran posted a joint teaser on Instagram.

== Critical reception ==
"Bam Bam" received positive reviews from critics. Official Charts Company reviewed the song prior to release calling it "a break up bop" and dubbed the track as "a song of acceptance, hope and happiness". Vulture called it "a bona fide breakup bop". Rolling Stone stated in their review that "Camila Cabello brought the azúcar to all the right places with the release of her salsa-infused "Bam Bam" featuring Ed Sheeran." Billboard described the song as a "gyrating pop number [that] oozes Latin charm, with a warm tropical breeze blowing through" Katie Bain for Billboard described it as "a really catchy, accessible and breezy song that's easy to like"

Billboard named "Bam Bam" a contender for song of summer 2022.

"Bam Bam" won the 'International Collaboration of the Year' Award at the NRJ Music Awards of 2022.

"Bam Bam" was nominated for Best Pop Duo/Group at the 2023 Grammy Awards, Cabello's fourth nomination, and second in the Best Pop Duo/Group Category.

== Commercial performance ==
In its first week after release "Bam Bam" landed at number 23 on the Billboard Hot 100, and rose in its eighth week to a peak of 21, making it Cabello's 7th highest-charting song ever on the Hot 100. "Bam Bam" became Cabello's eighth top-40 hit on the Hot 100. The song debuted at Number 2 on the US Digital Song Sales chart. "Bam Bam" peaked at number 8 on the US Pop Airplay chart, Cabello's 8th Top 10 entry and highest since her release of "My Oh My" in 2020. "Bam Bam" charted for 20 weeks on the BB100 before going recurrent and exiting.

"Bam Bam" debuted at number 10 on the Billboard Global 200 marking Cabello's highest entry on the chart, it then rose and peaked at number 5 on the chart, marking Cabello's first top 5 entry.

In the UK, "Bam Bam" debuted on the UK Singles Chart at Number 22, before rising to number 7, marking Cabello's fifth Top 10 entry. In Ireland, "Bam Bam" peaked at number 4 on the Irish Singles Chart.

In Canada "Bam Bam" debuted at Number 10 on the Canadian Hot 100, before rising to number 4, making it Cabello's 3rd Top 5 hit in Canada. It peaked at number 4 on the Canada AC, and number 2 on Canadian Pop Radio.

In Australia "Bam Bam" debuted at Number 19 on the ARIA Singles Chart, before reaching a new peak of 11, marking Cabello's third-highest-charting song in Australia, it remained at number 11 for two consecutive weeks.

Overall "Bam Bam" has reached the Top 10 in 18 countries. "Bam Bam" is currently the 2nd most streamed female lead song released in 2022 on Spotify as of November 2022. It also spent its first 100 days after release inside the top 10 of the iTunes Worldwide Chart. The music platform Deezer announced "Bam Bam" was the most streamed female song of 2022 on the platform, and 3rd most overall.

== Awards and nominations ==
| Year | Ceremony | Category | Result |
|---|---|---|---|
| 2022 | Grammy Awards | Best Pop Duo/Group Performance | Nominated |
| 2022 | MTV Video Music Awards | Best Cinematography | Nominated |
| 2022 | Nickelodeon Mexico Kids' Choice Awards | International Hit of the Year | Nominated |
| 2022 | NRJ Music Awards | International Song of the Year | Nominated |
| 2022 | NRJ Music Awards | International Collaboration of the Year | Won |
| 2022 | People's Choice Awards | Collaboration of the Year | Nominated |

== Music video ==
The music video for "Bam Bam", directed by Mia Barnes, premiered on March 4, 2022.

As the video starts, Cabello is sitting on a curbside at night, drinking beer and eating ice cream, presumably miserable over the aftermath of a breakup. As the song starts, she goes into a club called "Life is Beautiful" where a party is going on and dances while dressed up and having fun with the party-goers. Meanwhile, as Sheeran's verse starts, he is sitting at a table and receives a notification that his ride was cancelled, and goes into the same club as Cabello, where he pulls out the guitar and starts playing. As the song progresses, it intercuts with scenes of Cabello walking with her friends, being rolled around in a shopping cart, and in a limousine in the rain. Sheeran playing his guitar is intercut multiple times. The final minute features Cabello and her friends in a laundromat playing with lingerie, then it cuts to the morning where she tosses a striped bucket hat to some patrons and smiles as it cuts to her in another building getting ready to do some yoga as the video ends.

The official lyric video was released on March 10, 2022. A second lyric video was released on April 8, 2022, alongside other lyric videos for the release of Cabello's album Familia.

== Live performances ==
On March 4, the day that "Bam Bam" was released, Cabello performed the song for the first time on The Late Late Show with James Corden. On March 29, Cabello and Sheeran performed the song for the first time together at the Concert for Ukraine benefit concert at Resorts World Arena in Birmingham, where Cabello also performed a cover of "Fix You" by Coldplay. On April 10, Cabello performed a solo performance of the song on Saturday Night Live. On April 12, Cabello performed "Bam Bam" solo on Today, alongside other songs Familia. On May 28, Cabello performed the song in the 2022 UEFA Champions League Final. On June 4 and 5, Cabello performed the song during the Wango Tango and WAZMATAZZ music festivals in California. "Bam Bam" was used in promotional material for Season 22 of The Voice, which Cabello will be a judge for.

"Bam Bam" was performed as part of Cabello's promo TikTok concert: Familia: Welcome to the Family as the closing performance.

== Credits and personnel ==
- Camila Cabello – lead vocals, songwriting
- Ed Sheeran – featured vocals, songwriting
- Ricky Reed – production, songwriting, programming
- Edgar Barrera – production, songwriting, programming
- Cheche Alara – production, songwriting, arrangement
- Scott Harris – songwriting
- Daniel Uribe – miscellaneous production
- Antonio Sol – background vocals
- Carlos Murguía – background vocals
- James Zavaleta – background vocals
- Ramon Stagnaro – guitar
- Carlitos del Puerto – bass
- George Shelby – saxophone
- Harry Kim – trumpet
- Michael Cordóne – trumpet
- Gerardo Rodriguez – trumpet
- Eric Jorgensen – trombone
- Luis Conte – percussion
- Kevin Ricard – percussion
- Manny Marroquin – mixing
- Emerson Mancini – mastering
- Bill Malina – engineering
- Ethan Shumaker – engineering
- James Kirk – engineering assistance
- Logan Taylor – engineering assistance

== Charts ==
=== Weekly charts ===
Weekly chart performance for "Bam Bam"
| Chart (2022) | Peak position |
|---|---|
| Argentina Hot 100 (Billboard) | 31 |
| Australia (ARIA) | 11 |
| Austria (Ö3 Austria Top 40) | 7 |
| Belgium (Ultratop 50 Flanders) | 7 |
| Belgium (Ultratop 50 Wallonia) | 2 |
| Bulgaria International (PROPHON) | 6 |
| Canada Hot 100 (Billboard) | 4 |
| Canada AC (Billboard) | 2 |
| Canada CHR/Top 40 (Billboard) | 2 |
| Canada Hot AC (Billboard) | 4 |
| Croatia (Billboard) | 22 |
| Czech Republic Singles Digital (ČNS IFPI) | 35 |
| Denmark (Tracklisten) | 11 |
| El Salvador (Monitor Latino) | 20 |
| Finland (Suomen virallinen lista) | 20 |
| France (SNEP) | 7 |
| Germany (GfK) | 12 |
| Global 200 (Billboard) | 5 |
| Greece International (IFPI) | 11 |
| Hungary (Dance Top 40) | 3 |
| Hungary (Rádiós Top 40) | 21 |
| Hungary (Single Top 40) | 6 |
| Hungary (Stream Top 40) | 27 |
| Iceland (Tónlistinn) | 7 |
| Ireland (IRMA) | 4 |
| Italy (FIMI) | 12 |
| Japan Hot 100 (Billboard) | 57 |
| Lithuania (AGATA) | 7 |
| Luxembourg (Billboard) | 4 |
| Mexico (Billboard Mexican Airplay) | 3 |
| Netherlands (Dutch Top 40) | 2 |
| Netherlands (Single Top 100) | 6 |
| New Zealand (Recorded Music NZ) | 21 |
| Norway (VG-lista) | 18 |
| Panama (Monitor Latino) | 6 |
| Peru (Billboard) | 24 |
| Peru (Monitor Latino) | 15 |
| Poland Airplay (ZPAV) | 3 |
| Portugal (AFP) | 5 |
| Romania TV Airplay (Media Forest) | 7 |
| San Marino (SMRRTV Top 50) | 4 |
| Singapore (RIAS) | 13 |
| Slovakia (Billboard) | 5 |
| Slovakia Airplay (ČNS IFPI) | 1 |
| Slovakia Singles Digital (ČNS IFPI) | 3 |
| South Africa Streaming (TOSAC) | 50 |
| South Korea (Gaon) | 188 |
| Spain (PROMUSICAE) | 22 |
| Suriname (Nationale Top 40) | 4 |
| Sweden (Sverigetopplistan) | 29 |
| Switzerland (Schweizer Hitparade) | 3 |
| UK Singles (Official Charts) | 7 |
| Uruguay (Monitor Latino) | 16 |
| US Billboard Hot 100 | 21 |
| US Adult Contemporary (Billboard) | 21 |
| US Adult Pop Airplay (Billboard) | 12 |
| US Dance Airplay (Billboard) | 30 |
| US Pop Airplay (Billboard) | 10 |
| US Rhythmic Airplay (Billboard) | 36 |
| Vietnam Hot 100 (Billboard) | 55 |

=== Year-end charts ===
2022 year-end chart performance for "Bam Bam"
| Chart (2022) | Position |
|---|---|
| Australia (ARIA) | 46 |
| Austria (Ö3 Austria Top 40) | 20 |
| Belgium (Ultratop 50 Flanders) | 14 |
| Belgium (Ultratop 50 Wallonia) | 5 |
| Canada (Canadian Hot 100) | 14 |
| Denmark (Tracklisten) | 27 |
| Germany (Official German Charts) | 38 |
| Global 200 (Billboard) | 29 |
| Hungary (Rádiós Top 40) | 84 |
| Hungary (Single Top 40) | 38 |
| Italy (FIMI) | 33 |
| Lithuania (AGATA) | 38 |
| Netherlands (Dutch Top 40) | 8 |
| Netherlands (Single Top 100) | 11 |
| Poland (ZPAV) | 19 |
| Sweden (Sverigetopplistan) | 86 |
| Switzerland (Schweizer Hitparade) | 9 |
| UK Singles (OCC) | 34 |
| US Billboard Hot 100 | 66 |
| US Adult Top 40 (Billboard) | 25 |
| US Mainstream Top 40 (Billboard) | 28 |

2023 year-end chart performance for "Bam Bam"
| Chart (2023) | Position |
|---|---|
| Hungary (Dance Top 40) | 44 |

2024 year-end chart performance for "Bam Bam"
| Chart (2024) | Position |
|---|---|
| Hungary (Dance Top 40) | 79 |

2025 year-end chart performance for "Bam Bam"
| Chart (2025) | Position |
|---|---|
| Hungary (Dance Top 40) | 80 |

== Certifications ==
Certifications for "Bam Bam"
| Region | Certification | Certified units/sales |
|---|---|---|
| Australia (ARIA) | Platinum | 70,000^{‡} |
| Austria (IFPI Austria) | 2× Platinum | 60,000^{‡} |
| Canada (Music Canada) | 3× Platinum | 240,000^{‡} |
| Denmark (IFPI Danmark) | Platinum | 90,000^{‡} |
| France (SNEP) | Diamond | 333,333^{‡} |
| Italy (FIMI) | 2× Platinum | 200,000^{‡} |
| Mexico (AMPROFON) | Platinum | 140,000^{‡} |
| New Zealand (RMNZ) | Platinum | 30,000^{‡} |
| Norway (IFPI Norway) | Platinum | 60,000^{‡} |
| Poland (ZPAV) | 2× Platinum | 100,000^{‡} |
| Portugal (AFP) | 3× Platinum | 30,000^{‡} |
| Spain (Promusicae) | 3× Platinum | 180,000^{‡} |
| Switzerland (IFPI Switzerland) | 2× Platinum | 40,000^{‡} |
| United Kingdom (BPI) | Platinum | 600,000^{‡} |
| United States (RIAA) | Platinum | 1,000,000^{‡} |
Streaming
| Greece (IFPI Greece) | Gold | 1,000,000^{†} |
| Slovakia (ČNS IFPI) | Gold | 850,000 |
| Sweden (GLF) | Platinum | 8,000,000^{†} |
^{‡} Sales+streaming figures based on certification alone.^{†} Streaming-only figures based on certification alone.

== Release history ==
Release history for "Bam Bam"
| Region | Date | Format | Label | Ref. |
|---|---|---|---|---|
| Various | March 4, 2022 | Digital download; streaming | Epic | |
| Italy | March 4, 2022 | Contemporary hit radio | Sony | |
| United States | March 7, 2022 | Adult contemporary radio | Epic | |
| United States | March 8, 2022 | Contemporary hit radio | Epic | |
