= Mon amour (Stromae and Camila Cabello song) =

2022 single by Belgian musician Stromae and American musician Camila Cabello

Single by Stromae and Camila Cabello

from the album Multitude
- Language: French; English
- Released: 27 July 2022
- Recorded: May 3, 2022 – 27 July 2022 (with Camila version)
- Label: Mosaert; Polydor; Universal France
- Songwriters: Stromae; Luc Van Haver; Camila Cabello
- Producers: Stromae; Van Haver; Moon Willis

Stromae singles chronology
"Fils de joie" (2022)	"Mon amour" (2022)	"Ma meilleure ennemie" (2024)

Camila Cabello singles chronology
"Hasta los Dientes" (2022)	"Mon amour" (2022)	"Ku Lo Sa" (2022)

Music video
- "Mon amour" on YouTube

"Mon amour" (English: "My Love") is a song by Belgian musician Stromae and American singer/songwriter Camila Cabello. It was released on 27 July 2022, as the fourth single from Stromae's album Multitude, which was released on 4 March 2022. It was written by the two artists and Luc Van Haver, brother of Stromae. It was produced by Stromae, his brother Luc Van Haver, and Moon Willis (Henry Durham, son of Victoria Wood and Geoffrey Durham).

A Love Island-inspired music video, directed by the director duo Julien & Quentin, was released on 27 July 2022.

== Critical reception ==
Jon Pareles of The New York Times ranked the song 14th in the best songs of 2022 list.

== Charts ==
=== Weekly charts ===
Weekly chart performance for "Mon amour" (solo or duet)
Chart (2022)	Peak position
Belgium (Ultratop 50 Flanders)	18
Belgium (Ultratop 50 Wallonia)	6
France (SNEP)	24
Switzerland (Schweizer Hitparade)	90

=== Year-end charts ===
Year-end chart performance for "Mon amour"
Chart (2022)	Position
Belgium (Ultratop Flanders)	118
Belgium (Ultratop Wallonia)	46

== Certifications ==
Certifications and sales for "Mon amour"
Region	Certification	Certified units/sales
Belgium (BRMA)	Gold	10,000^{‡}
France (SNEP)	Gold	100,000^{‡}
^{‡} Sales+streaming figures based on certification alone.
