= Fils de joie =

2022 single by Belgian musician Stromae

Single by Stromae

from the album Multitude
- Language: French
- English title: "Son of joy"
- Released: 23 June 2022
- Genre: Brazilian Funk
- Length: 3:15
- Label: Mosaert; Universal Music France; Polydor Records, Darkroom Records; Interscope Records
- Songwriter: Stromae
- Producer: Stromae

Stromae singles chronology
"L'enfer" (2022)	"Fils de joie" (2022)	"Mon amour" (2022)

Music video
- "Fils de joie" on YouTube

"Fils de joie" (English: "Son of joy") is a song by Belgian musician Stromae. It is the third single from his album Multitude, which was released on 4 March 2022. The 7-inch single was released on 23 June 2022.

The song tells the story of the child of a prostitute. The song includes a sample from a teaser for Netflix series Bridgerton. The melody combines baroque sounds and the ardor of Brazilian funk carioca. The song was also used in the soundtrack of video game FIFA 23.

A music video, directed by Henry Scholfield, was released on 7 March 2022. In the video, Stromae portrays the president of a fictional country. He gives a speech at a national funeral for a missing sex worker, surrounded by officers and wreaths, as a military parade and funeral procession unfolds.

== Track listing ==
7" vinyl (23 June 2022)
No.	Title	Length
1.	"Fils de joie"	3:15
2.	"Fils de joie (Instrumental)"	3:15

== Charts ==
=== Weekly charts ===
Weekly chart performance for "Fils de joie"
Chart (2022)	Peak position
Belgium (Ultratop 50 Flanders)	28
Belgium (Ultratop 50 Wallonia)	3
France (SNEP)	6
Global Excl. US (Billboard)	146
Luxembourg (Billboard)	12
Netherlands (Single Top 100)	30
Switzerland (Schweizer Hitparade)	8

=== Year-end charts ===
Year-end chart performance for "Fils de joie"
Chart (2022)	Position
Belgium (Ultratop 50 Flanders)	123
Belgium (Ultratop 50 Wallonia)	135

== Certifications ==
Certifications and sales for "Fils de joie"
Region	Certification	Certified units/sales
Belgium (BRMA)	Platinum	20,000^{‡}
France (SNEP)	Gold	100,000^{‡}
^{‡} Sales+streaming figures based on certification alone.

== Awards ==
Awards for "Fils de joie"
Award	Year	Category	Result	Ref.
Berlin Music Video Award	2022	Best Art Director	Won	
MTV Video Music Award	2022	Video for Good	Nominated	

== Release history ==
Release history for "Fils de joie"
Region	Date	Format	Label	Ref.
Italy	4 March 2022	Contemporary hit radio	Universal	
France	23 June 2022	7-inch	Mosaert; Polydor	
United States	25 June 2022	7-inch	Darkroom; Interscope	
