= House'llelujah =

Single by Stromae

from the album Cheese
- Released: 2010
- Recorded: 2010
- Genre: House; Eurodance
- Length: 3:59
- Label: Universal France
- Songwriter(s): Stromae
- Producer(s): Mosaert

Stromae singles chronology
"Te Quiero" (2010)	"House'llelujah" (2010)	"Rail de musique" (2010)

"House'llelujah" is a 2010 song by Belgian singer Stromae, released on 17 May 2010 as a promo-single for his album Cheese, on which it was included. The song only charted in Belgium. House'llelujah is derived from Hallelujah. He performed the song live at The Dome 55 in Hannover, Germany on 27 August 2010.

== Music video ==
The official music video to the song was uploaded to YouTube by Stromae on 15 September 2010. The video shows Stromae as a priest of a religion based around house music. The congregation watches him sing on a large screen while initially standing still and, later, starting to sing and dance.

== Personnel ==
Lead vocals

- Stromae

Production

- Mosaert – producer

== Track listings ==
1. House'llelujah (3:59)

== Charts ==
Chart (2010)	Peak position
Belgium (Ultratip Bubbling Under Flanders)	30
Belgium (Ultratop 50 Wallonia)	22
Poland (Dance Top 50)	36
