= Up Saw Liz =

Single by Stromae

from the album Mixture Elecstro
- Released: 22 December 2009
- Recorded: 2009
- Genre: Dance
- Length: 3:36
- Label: Vertigo; Mercury
- Songwriter(s): Stromae
- Producer(s): Mosaert

Stromae singles chronology
"Faut qu't'arretes le rap" (2003)	"Up Saw Liz" (2009)	"Alors on danse" (2009)

Remix cover

Music video
- "Up saw liz (official videoclip)" on YouTube

"Up Saw Liz" is a song by Belgian singer Stromae, released in 2009 as a non-album single. In 2010, the song and a remix were featured on Stromae's second EP, called Mixture Elecstro. The title, "Up Saw Liz" has no significant meaning. Stromae has stated in one of his YouTube videos that the concept of the song was to point out that when it comes to a song, people care more about the beat than the lyrics. He even states this in the song: De toute façon tu t'enfous de c'que j'dirais. Que je fasse mon refrain ou pas, que je le bosse ou que j'le bacle alors j'dirais n'importe quoi, which in English means "anyway you don't care about what I'd say. If I make a chorus or not, whether I work hard on it or mess it up, so I'd say nonsense".

== Release date ==
The official release date of the song is 22 December 2009 because then, it was posted to iTunes for downloading. As a no-album song, it was released some time around 2009, with the exact date unknown and as an album version, it was released on the album "Mixture Electro" on 27 February 2010.

== Track listings ==
1. Up Saw Liz (3:36)
2. Up Saw Liz (Remix) (3:23)
