= Oh Na Na =

2021 single by Camila Cabello, Myke Towers and Tainy

Single by Camila Cabello, Myke Towers and Tainy
- Language: English; Spanish
- Released: 29 October 2021 (original); 4 November 2021 (extended)
- Genre: Reggaeton
- Length: 3:23 (original); 3:40 (extended)
- Label: Epic
- Composer(s): Alejandro Borrero; Ilya Salmanzadeh; Ivanni Rodríguez; Marco Masís; Rickard Goransson; Savan Kotecha
- Lyricist(s): Camila Cabello; Michael Torres
- Producer(s): Tainy; Neon16

Camila Cabello singles chronology
"Don't Go Yet" (2021)	"Oh Na Na" (2021)	"Bam Bam" (2022)

Myke Towers singles chronology
"Experimento" (2021)	"Oh Na Na" (2021)

Tainy singles chronology
"Lo Siento BB:/" (2021)	"Oh Na Na" (2021)

"Oh Na Na" is a song by American singer and songwriter Camila Cabello, Puerto Rican rapper and singer Myke Towers, and Puerto Rican record producer Tainy. It was released on October 29, 2021, by Epic Records.

== Background and composition ==
The song is bilingual in English and Spanish. The songwriters include Alejandro Borrero, Cabello, Towers, Tainy, Ilya Salmanzadeh, Savan Kotecha, Ivanni Rodríguez and Rickard Goransson.

== Critical reception ==
Billboard described "Oh Na Na" as "an effervescent, bilingual dance single, pushing Cabello to match Towers' flow and swagger, to great success; following 'Don't Go Yet,' the pop star sounds more comfortable letting loose over Tainy's frenetic drum assortment".

== Charts ==
Chart (2021)	Peak position
New Zealand Hot Singles (RMNZ)	29
Spain (PROMUSICAE)	51
US Hot Latin Songs (Billboard)	20
US Latin Pop Airplay (Billboard)	8
US Latin Airplay (Billboard)	36

== Release history ==
Release dates and formats for "Oh Na Na"
Region	Date	Format(s)	Version(s)	Label	Ref.
Various	October 29, 2021	Digital download; streaming	Original	Epic	
Various	November 4, 2021	Digital download; streaming	Extended version	Epic	
