= Défiler =

2018 single by Stromae

Single by Stromae
- Released: 27 April 2018
- Recorded: 2018
- Length: 8:50
- Label: Mosaert
- Songwriter(s): Stromae
- Producer(s): Stromae

Stromae singles chronology
"Repetto X Mosaert" (2017)	"Défiler" (2018)	"Santé" (2021)

Music video
- "Défiler" on YouTube

"Défiler" is a song by Belgian singer Stromae. It was released on 27 April 2018 as a single. It reached the top 10 in Wallonia and France.

== Charts ==
Chart performance for "Défiler"
Chart (2018)	Peak position
Belgium (Ultratop 50 Flanders)	29
Belgium (Ultratop 50 Wallonia)	7
France (SNEP)	40
Hungary (Single Top 40)	39
Switzerland (Media Control Romandy)	9
