= Concert for Ukraine =

- Created by: Livewire Pictures; ITV plc Global Radio; Disasters Emergency Committee
- Presented by: Roman Kemp; Marvin Humes; Emma Bunton
- Starring: See below
- Country of origin: United Kingdom
- Original language: English

Production
- Production locations: Resorts World Arena, Birmingham
- Camera setup: Multi camera
- Running time: 128 minutes
- Production company: Livewire Pictures

Original release
- Network: ITV; STV; Capital FM; Heart
- Release: 29 March 2022

Concert for Ukraine was a two-hour benefit concert in the United Kingdom organised by ITV plc, Livewire Pictures, Global Radio and the Disasters Emergency Committee to raise funds for people affected by the 2022 Russian invasion of Ukraine through the DEC Appeal. The concert took place at the Resorts World Arena outside Birmingham on 29 March 2022, and featured a number of contemporary artists.

== Production and buildup ==
The concert was presented by Roman Kemp, Marvin Humes and Emma Bunton, who introduced the various acts and appeals for donations. It was broadcast on television by ITV, as well as being streamed live on the ITV Hub, while Global's Heart and Capital radio networks also aired coverage of performances. The concert was also simulcast in Ireland on Virgin Media One and was broadcast in Australia on ABC TV Plus on 30 March, the latter of which benefitted the ABC's "ABC Gives Ukraine Appeal", with proceeds going to the Emergency Action Alliance (EAA) Ukraine Appeal. Tickets to attend the concert were also made available. It was announced that all proceeds would go directly to the Disasters Emergency Committee's Ukraine Humanitarian Appeal, while ITV confirmed it would donate the advertising revenue from the concert, which it estimated to be around £3million, to the appeal.

The concert was organised by Guy Freeman of Livewire Pictures, who put the event together in three weeks. Details were announced on 16 March, with retailer Marks & Spencer confirmed as the event's lead sponsor.

== Setlist ==
The following is a setlist from the concert, including speeches and songs, as it aired in ITV on 29 March 2022:

- Snow Patrol – "Run"
- Emeli Sandé and The Kingdom Choir – "Brighter Days"
- Sir Trevor McDonald with a tribute to killed and injured War correspondents, including a report from Geraint Vincent
- Tom Odell – "Another Love"
- Anne-Marie – "Beautiful"
- Mel Giedroyc with a special report
- Jamala – "1944"
- Billie Eilish and Finneas O'Connell with a pre-recorded statement of support
- Manic Street Preachers – "If You Tolerate This Your Children Will Be Next"
- Becky Hill – "You Got the Love"
- Robert Rinder with a report on refugees arriving at a train station in Poland
- The Kingdom Choir – "Stand By Me"
- Ed Sheeran – "Perfect" and "Bad Habits"
- Report from Lviv on internally displaced persons within Ukraine
- Camila Cabello – "Fix You"
- Camila Cabello and Ed Sheeran – "Bam Bam"
- 94 violinists from 29 countries – “Verbovaya Doschechka” commencing with Illia Bondarenko recorded in a basement bomb shelter and finishing with Nicola Benedetti playing live on stage with Tamsin Greig and Eddie Marsan reading the words of refugees of Artem and Natalya
- Gregory Porter and The Kingdom Choir – "Revival"
- Paloma Faith – "Only Love Can Hurt Like This"
- Nile Rodgers and Chic – Medley of "Everybody Dance" and "We Are Family"

== Fundraising ==
A total of £11.3million had been raised by the end of the concert. By the afternoon of 30 March the concert had raised £13.4million for the Disasters Emergency Committee appeal.
