= Santé (song) =

2021 single by Stromae

Single by Stromae

from the album Multitude
- Language: French
- English title: "Cheers"
- Released: 15 October 2021
- Genre: Electronic; cumbia
- Length: 3:10
- Label: Polydor
- Songwriters: Juanpaio Toch; Moon Willis; Stromae

Stromae singles chronology
| "Défiler" (2018) | "Santé" (2021) | "L'enfer" (2022) |

Music video
- "Santé" on YouTube

"Santé" (English: "Cheers") is a song by Belgian singer-songwriter Stromae. It was released on 15 October 2021 via Polydor Records. The song was written by Juanpaio Toch, Moon Willis and Stromae.

== Content ==
"Santé" pays homage to those who keep working while others party and celebrate. These workers receive little recognition and seem invisible, but they are in fact essential to society. They include employees of catering and cleaning businesses, "caregivers, fishermen, drivers, [and] flight attendants". The name of the song is a play on the word "santé", which is used for celebratory toasts, but literally means "health" in French.

== Music video ==
An accompanying music video directed by Jaroslav Moravec and Stromae's brother Luc Van Haver was released on 16 October 2021. It shows a cast of "cooks, fishermen and waitresses break from their routine to bust out into some dance moves".

== Charts ==
=== Weekly charts ===
2021 weekly chart performance for "Santé"
| Chart (2021) | Peak position |
|---|---|
| Belgium (Ultratop 50 Flanders) | 2 |
| Belgium (Ultratop 50 Wallonia) | 1 |
| Canada Hot 100 (Billboard) | 87 |
| Canada AC (Billboard) | 43 |
| Euro Digital Song Sales (Billboard) | 9 |
| France (SNEP) | 3 |
| Global 200 (Billboard) | 143 |
| Luxembourg (Billboard) | 14 |
| Mexico Ingles Airplay (Billboard) | 18 |
| Netherlands (Dutch Top 40) | 34 |
| San Marino (SMRRTV Top 50) | 38 |
| Switzerland (Billboard) | 9 |
| US Hot Dance/Electronic Songs (Billboard) | 18 |

2022 weekly chart performance for "Santé"
| Chart (2022) | Peak position |
|---|---|
| Croatia (Airplay Radio Chart) | 53 |
| Netherlands (Single Top 100) | 22 |
| Switzerland (Schweizer Hitparade) | 7 |

=== Year-end charts ===
2021 year-end chart performance for "Santé"
| Chart (2021) | Position |
|---|---|
| Belgium (Ultratop Wallonia) | 59 |

2022 year-end chart performance for "Santé"
| Chart (2022) | Position |
|---|---|
| Belgium (Ultratop 50 Flanders) | 95 |
| Belgium (Ultratop 50 Wallonia) | 29 |
| Switzerland (Schweizer Hitparade) | 98 |

== Certifications ==
Certifications and sales for "Santé"
| Region | Certification | Certified units/sales |
|---|---|---|
| Belgium (BRMA) | 2× Platinum | 40,000^{‡} |
| Canada (Music Canada) | Gold | 40,000^{‡} |
| France (SNEP) | Diamond | 333,333^{‡} |
^{‡} Sales+streaming figures based on certification alone.

== Release history ==
Release history for "Santé"
| Region | Date | Format | Label | Ref. |
|---|---|---|---|---|
| Italy | 22 October 2021 | Contemporary hit radio | Universal | |
| France | 12 March 2022 | 7-inch | Mosaert; Polydor | |
| United States | 25 March 2022 | 7-inch | Darkroom; Interscope | |
| Various | 25 March 2022 | 7-inch | Universal | |
