= Alors on danse =

2009 single by Stromae

Single by Stromae

from the album Cheese
- Language: French
- Released: 26 September 2009
- Recorded: 2009
- Genre: Europop
- Length: 3:30
- Label: Vertigo; Island
- Songwriter: Stromae (Paul Van Haver)
- Producers: Stromae; Dimitri Borrey

Stromae singles chronology
"Up Saw Liz" (2009)	"Alors on danse" (2009)	"Bienvenue chez moi" (2010)

Music video
- "Alors On Danse (Official Music Video)" on YouTube

"Alors on danse" (pronounced [alɔʁ ɔ̃ dɑ̃s], French for "And so we dance") is a song by Belgian singer Stromae. It was released in September 2009 in Belgium and in February 2010 in the rest of Europe. The song reached number one in Belgium, Albania, Austria, Bulgaria, the Czech Republic, Denmark, Finland, France, Germany, Greece, Italy, Luxembourg, the Netherlands, Poland, Romania, Russia, Slovakia, Switzerland and Turkey, and also reached number one on the European Hot 100 Singles chart.

The song also became a success in North America after its release on 1 April 2010 in Canada, receiving airplay in Québec from NRJ Radio stations throughout the province, as well as CKOI-FM. Four months after the European release, almost one million copies worldwide were sold. The song spent 57 weeks on the German Singles Chart, making it the 40th song to spend one year or longer on that chart and the song with the 31st longest run. According to Francophonie Diffusion, "Alors on danse" was the most-played Francophone single worldwide of 2010. As of July 2014, it was the 83rd best-selling single of the 21st century in France, with 334,000 units sold.

Professional ratings
Review scores
Source	Rating
BBC	4/5 stars
Digital Spy	4/5 stars

== Music video ==
Directed by Stromae (Paul Van Haver) & Jérome Guiot. At the beginning of the video, a man (played by Stromae) is sitting in his office. After a hard day's work, he apparently wants to visit his child, but as he arrives at his wife's house he is told to leave. He proceeds to walk down the street, and as he does this a homeless man steals his coat. He then enters a pub. At first he does not appear to enjoy himself, but as he becomes more inebriated he begins to sing on a small stage. After his performance he's passed out, and he's taken back by an unknown man, possibly his boss, from the pub to his office desk.

== Covers and remixes ==
Pitbull covered the song under the name of "Guantanamera". American singer Lumidee released a cover version of the song along with rapper Chase Manhattan in March 2010. DJ Petro Panayoti released an Instrumental Remix at Byblos Club Africa in May 2010. Kanye West and Gilbere Forte released a remix together in August 2010.

In July 2018, a group of saxophonists (led by soloist Stéphane Mercier) performed an arrangement of the song at the Arcade du Cinquantenaire in Brussels for world leaders attending the NATO summit. In May 2019, Dubdogz's remix was officially released under Musical Freedom. The song is featured in The 100's sixth-season episode The Gospel of Josephine.

British DJs and producers Joel Corry and Jax Jones sampled the song in their 2021 track "Out Out" featuring British singer Charli XCX and American rapper Saweetie.

== Track listings ==
CD single

1. "Alors on danse" (Radio Edit) – 3:26
2. "Alors on danse" (Extended Mix) – 4:18

CD single – Promo 1 (Were)

1. "Alors on danse" – 3:26

CD single – Promo 2 (Mercury)

1. "Alors on danse" (Remix) – 2:51

UK iTunes – EP

1. "Alors on danse" (featuring Kanye West and Gilbere Forte) – 3:34
2. "Alors on danse" (featuring Erik Hassle) – 3:28
3. "Alors on danse" (Solo Remix) – 4:10
4. "Alors on danse" (Solo Dub Remix) – 4:09
5. "Alors on danse" (Mowgli Remix) – 6:25

Digital Downloading

1. "Alors on danse (Dubdogz Remix)" – 2:49

== Charts ==
=== Weekly charts ===
Weekly chart performance for "Alors on danse" by Stromae
Chart (2010–2024)	Peak position
Australia (ARIA) Remix featuring Kanye West	79
Austria (Ö3 Austria Top 40)	1
Belgium (Ultratop 50 Flanders)	1
Belgian Airplay (Ultratop Flanders)	1
Belgium (Ultratop 50 Wallonia)	1
Bulgaria Airplay (BAMP)	1
Canada Hot 100 (Billboard)	46
Czech Republic Airplay (ČNS IFPI)	1
Denmark (Tracklisten)	1
Europe (European Hot 100 Singles)	1
Finland (Suomen virallinen lista)	3
France (SNEP)	1
France Download (SNEP)	1
Germany (GfK)	1
Greece International Digital Singles (IFPI)	1
Hungary (Dance Top 40)	29
Hungary (Rádiós Top 40)	36
Hungary (Single Top 40)	32
Ireland (IRMA)	22
Israel International Airplay (Media Forest)	4
Italy (FIMI)	1
Luxembourg Digital Songs (Billboard)	1
Netherlands (Single Top 100)	1
Netherlands (Dutch Top 40)	1
Norway (VG-lista)	12
Poland Dance (ZPAV)	1
Romania Airplay (Media Forest)	1
Romania TV Airplay (Media Forest)	1
Russia Airplay (TopHit)	2
Russia Download (2M)	1
Scottish Singles Sales (Official Charts)	22
Slovakia Airplay (ČNS IFPI)	1
Spain (Promusicae)	9
Sweden (Sverigetopplistan)	2
Switzerland (Schweizer Hitparade)	1
Switzerland (Media Control Romandy)	1
UK Singles (Official Charts)	25
UK Dance (Official Charts)	5
US Dance Airplay (Billboard)	19

=== Year-end charts ===
Year-end chart performance for "Alors on danse" by Stromae
Chart (2010)	Position
Austrian Singles Chart	6
Belgian Dance Singles Chart (Flanders)	1
Belgian Singles Chart (Flanders)	1
Belgian Dance Singles Chart (Wallonia)	1
Belgian Singles Chart (Wallonia)	2
Denmark (Tracklisten)	4
Dutch Singles Chart	2
European Hot 100 Singles (Billboard)	5
French SNEP Singles Chart	3
German Singles Chart	7
Hungary (Dance Top 40)	91
Italian Singles Chart	7
Romanian Top 100	7
Russia Airplay (TopHit)	14
Spanish Singles Chart	40
Swedish Singles Chart	23
Swiss Singles Chart	5
UK Singles Chart (OCC)	188

=== Decade-end charts ===
Decade-end chart performance for "Alors on danse"
Chart (2000–2009)	Position
Austria (Ö3 Austria Top 40)	25
Netherlands (Single Top 100)	13

== Certifications ==
Region	Certification	Certified units/sales
Austria (IFPI Austria)	3× Platinum	90,000^{*}
Belgium (BRMA)	3× Platinum	60,000^{*}
Brazil (Pro-Música Brasil)	Platinum	60,000^{‡}
Canada (Music Canada)	6× Platinum	480,000^{‡}
Denmark (IFPI Danmark)	3× Platinum	270,000^{‡}
France (SNEP)	Diamond	858,900
Germany (BVMI)	7× Gold	1,050,000^{‡}
Italy (FIMI)	2× Platinum	140,000^{‡}
Netherlands (NVPI)	Platinum	20,000^{^}
New Zealand (RMNZ)	Platinum	30,000^{‡}
Russia (NFPF) Ringtone	3× Platinum	600,000^{*}
Spain (Promusicae)	Platinum	60,000^{‡}
Switzerland (IFPI Switzerland)	2× Platinum	40,000^{^}
Sweden (GLF)	Gold	10,000^{‡}
United Kingdom (BPI)	Platinum	600,000^{‡}
United States (RIAA)	Gold	500,000^{‡}
Streaming
Greece (IFPI Greece)	Platinum	2,000,000^{†}
^{*} Sales figures based on certification alone.^{^} Shipments figures based on certification alone.^{‡} Sales+streaming figures based on certification alone.^{†} Streaming-only figures based on certification alone.

== See also ==
- Ultratop 40 number-one hits of 2009
- Ultratop 40 number-one hits of 2010
- Ultratop 50 number-one hits of 2010
- List of number-one hits of 2010 (Austria)
- List of number-one hits of 2010 (Denmark)
- List of Dutch Top 40 number-one singles of 2010
- List of European number-one hits of 2010
- List of number-one hits of 2010 (France)
- List of number-one hits of 2010 (Germany)
- List of number-one hits of 2010 (Italy)
- List of number-one singles of 2010 (Romania)
- List of number-one hits of 2010 (Switzerland)
- List of Polish Dance Chart number-one singles of 2010
