= Cheese (album) =

Studio album by Stromae
- Released: 14 June 2010
- Recorded: 2009–10
- Genre: House; electronic
- Length: 41:51
- Label: Vertigo; Mosaert; Universal Music France; Mercury Records
- Producer: Stromae; Mosaert; Dimitri Borrey

Stromae chronology
Cheese (2010)	Racine carrée (2013)

Singles from Cheese
- 1. "Alors on danse" Released: 21 September 2009; 2. "Te Quiero" Released: 27 August 2010; 3. "House'llelujah" Released: 17 May 2010

Professional ratings
Review scores
Source	Rating
AllMusic	3/5 stars
The Guardian	3/5 stars
musicserver.cz	8/10 stars

Cheese is the debut album by Belgian musician Stromae, released on 14 June 2010. The songs "Bienvenue chez moi", "House'llelujah", "Rail de Musique", "Peace or Violence", "Te Quiero" and "Silence" were released as album-promo-singles, only "Rail de Musique" and "Bienvenue Chez Moi" did not chart. It features three official singles including the hit "Alors on danse", "Te Quiero" and "House'llelujah".

== Track listing ==
All tracks are written by Stromae.

No.	Title	Length
1.	"Bienvenue chez moi"	2:55
2.	"Te Quiero"	3:23
3.	"Peace or Violence"	3:08
4.	"Rail de musique"	4:08
5.	"Alors on danse"	3:26
6.	"Summertime"	3:04
7.	"Dodo"	3:58
8.	"Silence"	4:40
9.	"Je Cours"	3:15
10.	"House'llelujah"	3:59
11.	"Cheese"	3:02

== Personnel ==
Lead vocals, programming

- Stromae

Management

- Dimitri Borrey

Mastered By

- Pieter Wagter "Equus"

Production

- Mosaert – producer
- Lion Hell Capouillez – mixing
- Vince Lattuca – mixing
- Dati Bendo – Artwork
- Guillaume Mortier – Artwork
- Luc Junior Tam – Artwork
- Romain Biharz – Artwork
- Dati Bendo – photography

== Charts ==
=== Weekly charts ===
2010 weekly chart performance for Cheese
Chart (2010)	Peak position
Austrian Albums (Ö3 Austria)	33
Belgian Albums (Ultratop Flanders)	7
Belgian Albums (Ultratop Wallonia)	1
Canadian Albums Chart	58
German Albums (Offizielle Top 100)	29
Greek Albums (IFPI)	4
Swiss Albums (Schweizer Hitparade)	18

2014 weekly chart performance for Cheese
Chart (2014)	Peak position
French Albums (SNEP)	6

2022 weekly chart performance for Cheese
Chart (2022)	Peak position
Dutch Albums (Album Top 100)	69

=== Year-end charts ===
2010 year-end chart performance for Cheese
Chart (2010)	Position
Belgian Albums (Ultratop Flanders)	86
Belgian Albums (Ultratop Wallonia)	16
French Albums (SNEP)	91

2011 year-end chart performance for Cheese
Chart (2011)	Position
French Albums (SNEP)	116

2022 year-end chart performance for Cheese
Chart (2022)	Position
Belgian Albums (Ultratop Wallonia)	118

== Certifications ==
Region	Certification	Certified units/sales
Austria (IFPI Austria)	Gold	10,000^{*}
Belgium (BRMA)	2× Platinum	40,000^{*}
Canada (Music Canada)	Gold	40,000^{‡}
Denmark (IFPI Danmark)	Gold	10,000^{‡}
France (SNEP)	3× Platinum	260,000
Poland (ZPAV)	Gold	10,000^{‡}
^{*} Sales figures based on certification alone.^{‡} Sales+streaming figures based on certification alone.
