= Silence (Stromae song) =

Song by Stromae

from the album Cheese
- Recorded: 2010
- Genre: House; Eurodance
- Length: 4:40
- Label: Universal France
- Songwriter(s): Stromae
- Producer(s): Mosaert

"Silence" is a song by Belgian singer Stromae, released on his album Cheese (2010). The song has charted in Belgium.

== Charts ==
Chart (2010)	Peak position
Belgium (Ultratop 50 Wallonia)	26
