= Multitude (album) =

Studio album by Stromae
- Released: 4 March 2022
- Genre: Electronic
- Length: 35:42
- Language: French
- Labels: Mosaert; Polydor

Stromae chronology
Racine carrée (2013)	Multitude (2022)

Singles from Multitude
- 1. "Santé" Released: 15 October 2021; 2. "L'enfer" Released: 9 January 2022; 3. "Fils de joie" Released: 23 June 2022; 4. "Mon amour" Released: 27 July 2022

Professional ratings
Aggregate scores
Source	Rating
Metacritic	85/100
Review scores
Source	Rating
Clash	9/10
Evening Standard	4/5 stars
The Line of Best Fit	8/10
NME	4/5 stars
Pitchfork	8.0/10

Multitude is the third studio album by Belgian musician Stromae, released through Mosaert on 4 March 2022. It is Stromae's first album since Racine carrée in 2013. Multitude includes various music styles from different cultures, as seen in "Santé" and "L'enfer".

== Singles ==
"Santé" was released as the lead single on 15 October 2021, accompanied by a music video.

"L'enfer" was released as the second single on 9 January 2022 after he performed it live during an interview on TF1.

"Fils de joie" was released as the third single on 23 June 2022.

A duet version of "Mon amour" with Camila Cabello was released as the fourth single on 27 July 2022.

== Multitude Tour ==
List of concerts, showing date, city, country and venue
Date	City	Country	Venue
2022
North America
16 April	Indio	United States	Coachella
23 April	Indio	United States	Coachella
Europe
16 June	Ruoms	France	Aluna Festival
17 June	Lyon	France	Inversion
19 June	Werchter	Belgium	Werchter Boutique
30 June	Belfort	France	Les Eurockeennes
3 July	Marmande	France	Garorock
6 July	Lisbon	Portugal	NOS Alive
8 July	Bilbao	Spain	BBK Live Festival
10 July	Liège	Belgium	Les Ardentes
14 July	Carhaix-Plouguer	France	Les Vieilles Charrues
15 July	Saint-Malô-du-Bois	France	Festival de Poupet
20 July	Milan	Italy	Summer Festival
22 July	Nîmes	France	Festival de Nîmes
24 July	Nyon	Switzerland	Paléo Festival
12 August	Budapest	Hungary	Sziget Festival
13 August	Chorzów	Poland	Festival Park Slaski
17 August	Charleville-Mézières	France	Cabaret Vert
21 August	Biddinghuizen	Netherlands	Lowlands
28 August	Saint-Cloud	France	Rock en Seine
4 September	Munich	Germany	Superbloom Festival
North America
21 October	Vancouver	Canada	Pacific Coliseum
25 October	San Francisco	United States	Bill Graham Civic Auditorium
26 October	San Francisco	United States	Bill Graham Civic Auditorium
28 October	Los Angeles	United States	Shrine Auditorium
21 November	New York City	United States	Madison Square Garden
22 November	New York City	United States	Madison Square Garden
25 November	Montreal	Canada	Bell Centre
26 November	Montreal	Canada	Bell Centre
27 November	Montreal	Canada	Bell Centre
29 November	Toronto	Canada	Coca-Cola Coliseum
3 December	Washington, D.C.	United States	The Anthem
6 December	Boston	United States	Agganis Arena
11 December	Quebec City	Canada	Videotron Centre
14 December	Montreal	Canada	Bell Centre
2023
Europe
4 March	Bordeaux	France	Arkéa Arena
5 March	Bordeaux	France	Arkéa Arena
9 March	Marseille	France	Le Dôme
10 March	Marseille	France	Le Dôme
15 March	Brussels	Belgium	Palais 12
16 March	Brussels	Belgium	Palais 12
17 March	Brussels	Belgium	Palais 12

== Track listing ==
All lyrics are written by Stromae; all music is composed by Stromae, except where noted.

Multitude track listing
No.	Title	Music	Translation	Length
1.	"Invaincu"		"Undefeated"	2:05
2.	"Santé"	Stromae; Moon Willis; Juanpaio Toch	"Cheers"	3:11
3.	"La solassitude"		(combination of solitude and weariness)	3:02
4.	"Fils de joie"		"Son of Joy"	3:15
5.	"L'enfer"		"Hell"	3:09
6.	"C'est que du bonheur"	Stromae; Willis	"It's just happiness"	2:42
7.	"Pas vraiment"	Stromae; Selman Faris	"Not Really"	2:42
8.	"Riez"		"Laugh"	3:21
9.	"Mon amour"	Stromae; Luc Van Haver	"My Love"	2:52
10.	"Déclaration"		"Statement"	3:04
11.	"Mauvaise journée"		"Bad Day"	3:07
12.	"Bonne journée"	Stromae; Van Haver; Orelsan	"Good Day"	3:12
Total length:				35:42

== Critical reception ==
According to Metacritic, a review aggregator website which normalizes reviews on a scale out of 100, Multitude scored a weighted average of 85, indicating "universal acclaim".

== Charts ==
=== Weekly charts ===
Weekly chart performance for Multitude
Chart (2022)	Peak position
Austrian Albums (Ö3 Austria)	2
Belgian Albums (Ultratop Flanders)	1
Belgian Albums (Ultratop Wallonia)	1
Canadian Albums (Billboard)	4
Danish Albums (Hitlisten)	8
Dutch Albums (Album Top 100)	1
French Albums (SNEP)	1
German Albums (Offizielle Top 100)	4
Hungarian Albums (MAHASZ)	27
Icelandic Albums (Tónlistinn)	33
Irish Albums (IRMA)	89
Italian Albums (FIMI)	10
Lithuanian Albums (AGATA)	32
Scottish Albums (Official Charts)	49
Spanish Albums (Promusicae)	6
Swedish Albums (Sverigetopplistan)	59
Swiss Albums (Schweizer Hitparade)	1
Swiss Albums (GfK Romandy)	1
UK Albums (Official Charts)	94
US Top Album Sales (Billboard)	49
US Heatseekers Albums (Billboard)	2
US World Albums (Billboard)	1

=== Year-end charts ===
2022 year-end chart performance for Multitude
Chart (2022)	Position
Belgian Albums (Ultratop Flanders)	5
Belgian Albums (Ultratop Wallonia)	1
Dutch Albums (Album Top 100)	7
French Albums (SNEP)	3
Swiss Albums (Schweizer Hitparade)	3

2023 year-end chart performance for Multitude
Chart (2023)	Position
Belgian Albums (Ultratop Flanders)	71
Belgian Albums (Ultratop Wallonia)	24
French Albums (SNEP)	79

2024 year-end chart performance for Multitude
Chart (2024)	Position
Belgian Albums (Ultratop Wallonia)	132
French Albums (SNEP)	185

2025 year-end chart performance for Multitude
Chart (2025)	Position
Belgian Albums (Ultratop Wallonia)	125

== Certifications and sales ==
Certifications and sales for Multitude
Region	Certification	Certified units/sales
Belgium (BRMA)	3× Platinum	60,000^{‡}
France (SNEP)	3× Platinum	300,000^{‡}
Summaries
Worldwide	—	870,000
^{‡} Sales+streaming figures based on certification alone.
