= L'enfer (song) =

2022 single by Stromae

Single by Stromae

from the album Multitude
- Language: French
- Released: 9 January 2022
- Length: 3:09
- Label: Polydor
- Songwriter: Stromae
- Producer: Stromae

Stromae singles chronology
"Santé" (2021)	"L'enfer" (2022)	"Fils de joie" (2022)

Music video
- "L'enfer" on YouTube

"L'enfer" (English: "Hell") is a song by Belgian singer-songwriter Stromae. It was first released on 9 January 2022 with a live performance during an interview on the evening news on main French television channel TF1. It deals with depression and suicidal thoughts. It is the second single from his album Multitude, which was released on 4 March 2022.

== Track listing ==
7" vinyl
No.	Title	Length
1.	"L'enfer"	3:09
2.	"L'enfer (Instrumental)"	3:09

== Charts ==
=== Weekly charts ===
Weekly chart performance for "L'enfer"
Chart (2022)	Peak position
Belgium (Ultratop 50 Flanders)	1
Belgium (Ultratop 50 Wallonia)	1
France (SNEP)	1
Germany (Single Trending Charts)	11
Global 200 (Billboard)	109
Israel (Media Forest)	2
Luxembourg (Billboard)	4
Netherlands (Dutch Top 40)	4
Netherlands (Single Top 100)	6
Russia Airplay (TopHit)	21
Switzerland (Schweizer Hitparade)	2
Ukraine Airplay (TopHit)	38

=== Year-end charts ===
2022 year-end chart performance for "L'enfer"
Chart (2022)	Position
Belgium (Ultratop Flanders)	22
Belgium (Ultratop Wallonia)	4
France (SNEP)	33
Netherlands (Dutch Top 40)	40
Netherlands (Single Top 100)	55
Russia Airplay (TopHit)	162
Switzerland (Schweizer Hitparade)	59

== Certifications ==
Certifications and sales for "L'enfer"
Region	Certification	Certified units/sales
Belgium (BRMA)	3× Platinum	60,000^{‡}
Canada (Music Canada)	Gold	40,000^{‡}
France (SNEP)	Diamond	333,333^{‡}
^{‡} Sales+streaming figures based on certification alone.

== Release history ==
Release history for "L'enfer"
Region	Date	Format	Label	Ref.
Russia	11 January 2022	Contemporary hit radio	Universal	
Italy	14 January 2022	Contemporary hit radio	Universal	
France	18 March 2022	7-inch	Mosaert; Polydor	
United States	25 March 2022	7-inch	Darkroom; Interscope	
