= Peace or Violence =

Single by Stromae

from the album Cheese
- Released: 31 May 2010
- Recorded: 2010
- Genre: House; Eurodance
- Length: 3:08
- Label: Universal France
- Songwriter(s): Stromae
- Producer(s): Mosaert

"Peace or Violence" is a 2010 song by Belgian singer Stromae, released on 31 May as the fourth promo-single for his album Cheese.

== Track listing ==
1. Peace or Violence (3:08)

== Charts ==
=== Weekly charts ===
| Chart (2010–2011) | Peak position |
|---|---|
| Austria (Ö3 Austria Top 40) | 74 |
| Belgium (Ultratip Bubbling Under Flanders) | 12 |
| Belgium (Ultratop 50 Wallonia) | 12 |

=== Year-end charts ===
| Chart (2011) | Position |
|---|---|
| Belgium (Ultratop Wallonia) | 79 |
