= Te Quiero (Stromae song) =

Single by Stromae

from the album Cheese
- Released: 27 August 2010
- Recorded: 2010
- Genre: House; Eurodance
- Length: 3:23
- Label: Universal France
- Songwriter: Stromae
- Producer: Mosaert

Stromae singles chronology
"Bienvenue chez moi" (2010)	"Te Quiero" (2010)	"House'llelujah" (2010)

"Te Quiero" (English: I Love You) is a 2010 song by Belgian singer Stromae, released on May 10, 2010, as a CD-promo-single and on June 7 it was released as the 5th promo-single for his first album, Cheese. The official release date as a single of the album was August 27. The song has charted in Belgium, the Czech Republic, Poland and in Switzerland.

== Music video ==
The official music video of the song shows Stromae himself at a filming stage falling in love with his film partner. The video was styled by fashion designer and stylist Valentine Avoh.

=== Unofficial music video ===
On May 28, 2010, Stromae uploaded an unofficial music video of the song, in which he walks into a huge hall, goes to a microphone standing in the middle of it, singing the song and then leaving. This video is called "Stromae – "Te Quiero" ... ceci n'est pas un clip" (‘Te Quiero...this is not a music video’).

In the video, Stromae emulates the gestures and impassioned style of Jacques Brel. The lyrics reference Brel as well: "Je voudrais être son ombre/ Mais je la déteste" ("I wanted to be her shadow/ But I hate her") echoes "Laisse-moi devenir/ L'ombre de ton ombre" ("Let me become/ The shadow of your shadow") in Brel's "Ne Me Quitte Pas".

== Track listings ==
1. "Te Quiero" (3:23)
2. "Te Quiero (Paul Kalkbrenner Remix)" (7:06)

== Personnel ==
Lead vocals

- Stromae

Management

- Dimitri Borrey

Mastered By

- Pieter Wagter "Equus"

Production

- Mosaert – producer
- Lion Hell Capouillez – mixing
- Vince Lattuca – mixing
- Dati Bendo – Artwork
- Guillaume Mortier – Artwork
- Luc Junior Tam – Artwork
- Romain Biharz – Artwork
- Dati Bendo – photography

== Chart performance ==
=== Weekly charts ===
2010 weekly chart performance for "Te Quiero"
Chart (2010)	Peak position
Belgium (Ultratop 50 Flanders)	17
Belgium (Ultratop 50 Wallonia)	4
Czech Republic Airplay (ČNS IFPI)	90
Netherlands (Single Top 100)	70
Poland Dance (ZPAV)	32
Switzerland (Schweizer Hitparade)	62

2011 weekly chart performance for "Te Quiero"
Chart (2011)	Peak position
Netherlands (Single Top 100)	72

2013 weekly chart performance for "Te Quiero"
Chart (2013)	Peak position
France (SNEP)	153

2015 weekly chart performance for "Te Quiero"
Chart (2015)	Peak position
France (SNEP)	158

=== Year-end charts ===
Chart (2010)	Position
Belgium (Ultratop Flanders)	93
Belgium (Ultratop Wallonia)	33

== Certifications ==
Region	Certification	Certified units/sales
Belgium (BRMA)	Gold	10,000^{*}
France (SNEP)	Gold	100,000^{‡}
^{*} Sales figures based on certification alone.
